= List of aircraft (Go–Gz) =

This is a list of aircraft in alphabetical order beginning with 'Go–Gz'.

== Go–Gz ==
=== Goair ===
- Goair GT-1 Trainer

=== Gobosh Aviation ===
(Moline, IL)

- Gobosh 700S
- Gobosh 800XP

=== Godbille ===
(Jean Godbille / Jacques and Jean Godbille)

- Godbille JG.1B
- Godbille GJJ

=== Goddard ===
(Norman A Goddard, San Diego and Imperial, CA)

- Goddard Essie-V
- Goddard 1927 Monoplane

=== Gödecker ===
(Jacob Gödecker]]

- Gödecker B type
- Gödecker flugboote

=== GoFly ===
(GoFly Aeronatique)

- GoFly Gotar

=== Gohin ===
(Christian Gohin)

- Gohin CG.01

=== Gohn ===
(Alfred A Gohn, E Warren, PA)

- Gohn A

=== Golasky ===
(Adolph Golasky, Rising Sun School of Aeronautics, Collegeville, PA)

- Golasky G2-1

=== Golden Arrow ===
(Golden Arrow Aircraft Co, Columbus, OH)

- Golden Arrow Sport

=== Golden Car ===
(Golden Car SpA, Caramagna Piemonte, Italy)

- Golden Car Brio
- Golden Car F30

=== Golden Circle Air ===
(Golden Circle Air, Inc., De Soto, IA)

- Golden Circle Air T-Bird

=== Golden Eagle ===
(Golden Eagle Aircraft Corp, Port Columbus, OH)

- Golden Eagle ROBC Sport
- Golden Eagle C-5
- Golden Eagle Chief
- Golden Eagle Junbior Pursuit

=== Golden Gate Aviation ===
- Golden Gate Mosquito

=== Goldwing Ltd ===
- Goldwing Ltd Goldwing

=== Golubkov ===
- Golubkov SRB

=== Gonserkevis ===
(Al J Gonserkevis, Sevell, NJ)

- Gonserkevis Cherokee

=== Gonzales ===
(Arthur and Willie Gonzales, 435 16th Ave, San Francisco, CA)

- Gonzales 1912 Biplane

=== González Gil-Pazó ===
(Arturo González Gil y Santibañez and José Pazó)

- González Gil-Pazó No.1
- González Gil-Pazó GP-1
- González Gil-Pazó GP-2
- González Gil-Pazó GP-4

=== Goodland ===
(Goodland Aviation Co, Goodland, KS)

- Goodland 1909 Aeroplane

=== Goodman ===
(Claude Goodman, Wilmington, NC)

- Goodman 1927 Monoplane

=== Goodsell ===
(Vernon Goodsell)

- Goodsell XP-Talon

=== FL Goodwin ===
(Phoenix, AZ)

- Goodwin Buckshot
- Goodwin Tri-Moto

=== Goodyear ===
(Goodyear Aerospace Corp.)

- Goodyear FG Corsair
- Goodyear F2G Corsair
- Goodyear GA-1 Duck
- Goodyear GA-2 Duck
- Goodyear GA-22 Drake
- Goodyear GA-33 Inflatoplane
- Goodyear GA-400R Gizmo
- Goodyear GA-447 Inflatoplane
- Goodyear GA-466 Inflatoplane
- Goodyear GA-468 Inflatoplane
- Goodyear AO-2 Inflatoplane
- Goodyear AO-3 Inflatoplane

==== Goodyear Lighter than Air Craft ====
- Goodyear Defender
- Goodyear Enterprise
- Goodyear Pilgrim
- Goodyear Rainbow
- Goodyear Ranger
- Goodyear Reliance
- Goodyear Resolute
- Goodyear Type AD
- Goodyear C3
- Goodyear Caquot P
- Goodyear Caquot R
- Goodyear EZ
- Goodyear GZ-19
- Goodyear GZ-20
- Goodyear GZ-21
- Goodyear GZ-22
- Goodyear B
- Goodyear C
- Goodyear D
- Goodyear E
- Goodyear EZ-1B
- Goodyear F
- Goodyear G
- Goodyear H
- Goodyear J
- Goodyear K
- Goodyear L
- Goodyear M
- Goodyear N
- Goodyear O
- Goodyear R
- Goodyear RS-1
- Goodyear NFG
- Goodyear OB-1
- Goodyear SZ
- Goodyear TC
- Goodyear Type TZ
- Goodyear XZWG
- Goodyear ZF
- Goodyear ZGS
- Goodyear ZGT
- Goodyear ZK
- Goodyear ZP2N-1W
- Goodyear ZPG-2W
- Goodyear ZPG-3W
- Goodyear ZNN-G
- Goodyear ZNN-L
- Goodyear ZNP-K
- Goodyear ZNP-M
- Goodyear ZPG
- Goodyear ZPK
- Goodyear ZP2K
- Goodyear ZP3K
- Goodyear ZP4K
- Goodyear ZP5K
- Goodyear ZPM
- Goodyear ZP2M
- Goodyear ZPN
- Goodyear ZP2N
- Goodyear ZRS-4 Akron
- Goodyear ZRS-5 Macon
- Goodyear ZS2G
- Goodyear ZSG

=== Göppingen ===
(Sportflugzeugbau Göppingen Martin Schempp became Sportflugzeugbau Schempp-Hirth)

- Göppingen Gö 1 Wolf I sailplane, 1935
- Göppingen Gö 3 Minimoa sailplane, 1936
- Göppingen Gö 4 sailplane
- Göppingen Gö 5 sailplane, 1937
- Göppingen Gö 8
- Göppingen Gö 9 development aircraft for Do 335 Pfeil

=== Gorbunov ===
- Gorbunov GSh
- Gorbunov 105

=== Gordon ===
(Frank Gordon dba The Airplane Factory, Los Molinos and Red Bluff, CA)

- Gordon A-3

=== Gordon ===
(Premier Aircraft Constructions Ltd.)

- Gordon Dove

=== Gosport ===
(Gosport Aircraft Company Limited)

- Gosport Shrimp
- Gosport patrol flying boat
- Gosport touring flying boat
- Gosport mail flying boat
- Gosport Fire-Fighter 10-seat flying boat
- Gosport Popular 2-seat touring flying boat
- Gosport G.5
- Gosport G.5a
- Gosport G.8
- Gosport G.8a
- Gosport G.9

=== Götaverken ===
(AB Götaverken)

- Götaverken GV 38

=== Gotch & Brundage ===
(Gus Gotch & Tom Brundage, Dycer Airport, Los Angeles, CA)

- Gotch & Brundage Special (a.k.a. Mason Meteor)

=== Gotha ===
(Gothaer Waggonfabrik A,G, Gotha)

- Gotha A.I
- Gotha B.I
- Gotha B.II
- Gotha G.I
- Gotha G.II
- Gotha G.III
- Gotha G.IV
- Gotha G.V
- Gotha G.VI
- Gotha G.VII
- Gotha G.VIII
- Gotha G.IX
- Gotha G.X
- Gotha Go 145
- Gotha Go 146
- Gotha Go 147
- Gotha Go 148
- Gotha Go 149
- Gotha Go 150
- Gotha Go 229
- Gotha Go 229
- Gotha Go 241
- Gotha Go 242
- Gotha Go 244
- Gotha Go 245
- Gotha Go 267
- Gotha Go 345
- Gotha Ka 430
- Gotha LD.1
- Gotha LD.1a
- Gotha LD.2
- Gotha LD.3
- Gotha LD.4
- Gotha LD.5
- Gotha LD.6
- Gotha LD.7
- Gotha LD.10
- Gotha LE.1
- Gotha LE.2
- Gotha LE.3
- Gotha WD.1
- Gotha WD.2
- Gotha WD.2a
- Gotha WD.3
- Gotha WD.4
- Gotha WD.5
- Gotha WD.7
- Gotha WD.8
- Gotha WD.9
- Gotha WD.11
- Gotha WD.12
- Gotha WD.13
- Gotha WD.14
- Gotha WD.15
- Gotha WD.20
- Gotha WD.22
- Gotha WD.27
- Gotha Ursinus UWD

=== Gould, Content & Loening ===
- Gould, Content & Loening 1909 Biplane

=== Goupy ===
(Louis Ambroise Goupy)

- Goupy Type A
- Goupy Type AA
- Goupy Type B
- Goupy Type Militaire
- Goupy Biplan 1911
- Goupy Hydroaeroplane
- Goupy Ibis
- Goupy I
- Goupy II
- Goupy III
- Goupy 1913 single-seat biplane

=== Gourdou-Leseurre ===
- Gourdou-Leseurre Type A a.k.a. GL 1
- Gourdou-Leseurre Type B a.k.a. GL 2
  - Gourdou-Leseurre Type B1 a.k.a. GL 2
  - Gourdou-Leseurre Type B2 a.k.a. GL 21
  - Gourdou-Leseurre Type B3 a.k.a. GL 22
  - Gourdou-Leseurre Type B4 a.k.a. GL 23
  - Gourdou-Leseurre Type B5 a.k.a. GL 22 ET
  - Gourdou-Leseurre Type B6 a.k.a. GL 24
  - Gourdou-Leseurre Type B7 a.k.a. GL 25
- Gourdou-Leseurre Type C
- Gourdou-Leseurre Type D
- Gourdou-Leseurre Type E
- Gourdou-Leseurre Type F a.k.a. GL 50
- Gourdou-Leseurre Type G a.k.a. GL 40
- Gourdou-Leseurre Type H a.k.a. GL 50
- Gourdou-Leseurre Type I a.k.a. GL 31
  - Gourdou-Leseurre Type I1 a.k.a. GL I
  - Gourdou-Leseurre Type I2 a.k.a. GL I2
  - Gourdou-Leseurre Type I3 a.k.a. GL 31
- Gourdou-Leseurre Type J
- Gourdou-Leseurre Type K
- Gourdou-Leseurre Type L
  - Gourdou-Leseurre Type L1
  - Gourdou-Leseurre Type L2
  - Gourdou-Leseurre Type L3
- Gourdou-Leseurre Type M
  - Gourdou-Leseurre Type M1
  - Gourdou-Leseurre Type M2
- Gourdou-Leseurre GL.1
- Gourdou-Leseurre GL.2
- Gourdou-Leseurre GL.21
- Gourdou-Leseurre GL.22
- Gourdou-Leseurre GL.23
- Gourdou-Leseurre GL.24
  - Gourdou-Leseurre GL.24X
- Gourdou-Leseurre GL.30
- Gourdou-Leseurre GL.31
- Gourdou-Leseurre LGL.32
- Gourdou-Leseurre LGL.321
- Gourdou-Leseurre LGL.323
- Gourdou-Leseurre LGL.324
- Gourdou-Leseurre LGL.33
- Gourdou-Leseurre LGL.34
- Gourdou-Leseurre LGL.341
- Gourdou-Leseurre LGL.351
- Gourdou-Leseurre LGL.390
- Gourdou-Leseurre GL.410
- Gourdou-Leseurre GL.430
- Gourdou-Leseurre GL.432
- Gourdou-Leseurre GL.450
- Gourdou-Leseurre GL.482
- Gourdou-Leseurre GL.50
- Gourdou-Leseurre GL.51
- Gourdou-Leseurre GL.521
- Gourdou-Leseurre GL.60
- Gourdou-Leseurre GL.633
- Gourdou-Leseurre GL.810 HY
- Gourdou-Leseurre GL.811 HY
- Gourdou-Leseurre GL.812 HY
- Gourdou-Leseurre GL.813 HY
- Gourdou-Leseurre GL.820 HY
- Gourdou-Leseurre GL.821 HY
- Gourdou-Leseurre GL.823 HY
- Gourdou-Leseurre GL.831 HY
- Gourdou-Leseurre GL.832 HY

=== Gowland ===
- Gowland Jenny Wren

=== Gracey ===
(William Gracey, Niagara Falls, NY)

- Gracey 1911 Biplane

=== Gradient sro ===
(Prague, Czech Republic)

- Gradient Agility
- Gradient Aspen
- Gradient Avax
- Gradient BiGolden
- Gradient BiOnyx
- Gradient Bliss
- Gradient Bright
- Gradient Delite
- Gradient Denali
- Gradient Eiger
- Gradient Freestyle
- Gradient Golden
- Gradient Montana
- Gradient Nevada

=== Graf von Saurma-Jeltsch-Vogt ===
(Graf von Saurma-Jeltsch & Alfred Vogt)

- Graf von Saurma-Jeltsch - Vogt Milan

=== Graham-Perren ===
(George Graham & Charles Perren Jr, Waukesha, WI)

- Graham-Perren Racer
- Graham-Perren 1933 Monoplane

=== Grahame-White ===
- Grahame-White Baby
- Grahame-White Bantam
- Grahame-White Naval and Military Biplane
- Grahame-White E.IV Ganymede bomber
- Grahame-White E.7
- Grahame-White E.8 Aero-Limousine
- Grahame-White E.9 Ganymede airliner
- Grahame-White Type VI
- Grahame-White Type X Charabanc
- Grahame-White Type XI
- Grahame-White Type XIII
- Grahame-White Type XV
- Grahame-White Type 18
- Grahame-White G.W.19

=== Grandjean ===
(Daniel Grandjean)

- Grandjean DG.01 Alcyon

=== Grandjean ===
(René Grandjean)

- Grandjean L-1

=== Granville ===
(Edward Granville, Springfield, MA)

- Granville Mono

=== Granville ===
(Robert Granville, Springfield, MA)

- Granville Bee Gee Baby

=== Granville Brothers Aircraft (Gee Bee) ===
(Granville Brothers (Edward, Mark, Robert, Thomas, Zantford) Aircraft, Springfield, MA )

- Granville Gee Bee Model A
- Granville Gee Bee Model B Sportster
- Granville Gee Bee Model C Sportster
- Granville Gee Bee Model C-4 Fourster
- Granville Gee Bee Model C-6 Sixster
- Granville Gee Bee Model C-8 Eightster
- Granville Gee Bee Model D Sportster
- Granville Gee Bee Model E Sportster
- Granville Gee Bee Model F Sportster
- Granville Gee Bee Model Q Ascender
- Granville Gee Bee Model R Super Sportster
- Granville Gee Bee Model R-6C QED - Conqueror engine
- Granville Gee Bee Model R-6H QED - Hornet engine
- Granville Gee Bee Model X Sportster
- Granville Gee Bee Model Y Senior Sportster
- Granville Gee Bee Model Z Super Sportster

=== Gratsianski ===
(Alexei Nikolayevich Gratsianski)

- Gratsiansky Omega (built at khAI)

=== Gravereau ===
(Daniel Gravereau & J.P. Drouillard)

- Gravereau GD.200 Gladiateur

=== Grawert ===
(Fritz Grawert)

- Grawert flugboote

=== Gray ===
((Earl T) Gray & (Birney) Taliaferro, 1815 N Van Ness, Los Angeles, CA)

- Gray BT-1

=== Gray ===
(Shadetree Aviation Inc, Carson City, NV)

- Gray Special

=== Gray goose ===
(Gray Goose Airways (fdr: Jonathan E Caldwell), Denver, CO)

- Gray Goose Cyclogyro
- Gray Goose Windmill Plane

=== Grays Harbor ===
- Grays Harbor Activian

=== Greisch-Thuet ===
(Charles Greisch & Thuet)

- Greisch-Thuet Parasol

=== Great Lakes ===
- Great Lakes BG
- Great Lakes B2G
- Great Lakes TG
- Great Lakes XSG
- Great Lakes TBG
- Great Lakes Sport Trainer
- Great Lakes 2-S-W
- Great Lakes 2-T-1
- Great Lakes 2-T-2 Speedster
- Great Lakes 4-A-1
- Great Lakes 41
- Great Lakes TG-1 Commercial
- Great Lakes X
- Great lakes XPT-930 (a.k.a. Model 41)

=== Great Plains Aircraft ===
- Great Plains Aircraft Easy Eagle

=== Great Western ===
(Great Western Airways Inc, Los Angeles, CA)

- Great Western XB-1

=== Green Sky Adventures ===
(Ed Fisher)

- Green Sky Adventures Micro Mong
- Green Sky Zippy Sport
- Green Sky Micro Mong 2XF

=== Greenapples ===
(Greenapples Aircraft (Fdr: L Gale Abels), Boulder, CO)

- Greenapples AT-19

=== Greene ===
(Dr William Greene)

- Greene 1901 Biplane
- Greene 1909 Biplane

=== Greene ===
(Greene Composite Type Aircraft Corp, 111 Sutter St, San Francisco, CA)

- Greene 1929 Aeroplane

=== Greenwalt ===
(Wilmer W Greenwalt (or Greenawalt), Detroit, MI)

- Greenwalt Burco Sport

=== Greenwood ===
(Marvin Greenwood)

- Greenwood Witch

=== Greenwood-Yates ===
(North Pacific Aircraft Corp (founders: Allan D Greenwood & George Yates), Seattle, WA)

- Greenwood-Yates Bicraft

=== Grega ===
(John W Grega, Bedford, OH)

- Grega GN-1 Aircamper

=== Gregg ===
(Gregg Aircraft Mfg Co, Pueblo, CO)

- Gregg A-75

=== Gregor ===
(Michael Gregor, Roosevelt Field, NY)

- Gregor FDB-1
- Gregor GR-1 Sportplane
- Gregor GR-1 Continental
- Gregor GR-2

=== Greisch-Thuet ===
- Greisch-Thuet 1937 monoplane

=== Grenet ===
(Pierre Grenet)

- Grenet G.47
- Grenet PG.2 Bison

=== Gribovsky ===
(Vladimir Gribovsky)

- Gribovsky G-3
- Gribovsky G-4
- Gribovsky G-5
- Gribovsky G-8
- Gribovsky G-10
- Gribovsky G-11
- Gribovsky G-11M
- Gribovsky G-15
- Gribovsky G-20
- Gribovsky G-21
- Gribovsky G-22
- Gribovsky G-23
- Gribovsky G-25
- Gribovsky G-26
- Gribovsky G-27
- Gribovsky G-28
- Gribovsky G-29
- Gribovsky G-30
- Gribovsky Dosav

=== Grif ===
(Grif, Castel Sant'Elia, Italy)

- Grif Eos
- Grif H2000

=== Griffon ===
(Griffon Aerospace Inc, Huntsville, AL)

- Griffon Lionheart

=== Grigorov ===
(Atanas Grigorov)

- Grigorov-1 named Leitenant Liapchev

=== Grigorovich ===
(Dmitry Pavlovich Grigorovich)

- Grigorovich DG-52
- Grigorovich DG-53
- Grigorovich DG-56
- Grigorovich DG-58
- Grigorovich DI-3
- Grigorovich E-2
- Grigorovich GASN
- Grigorovich I-1
- Grigorovich I-2
- Grigorovich I-5
- Grigorovich I-9
- Grigorovich I-10
- Grigorovich I-Z
- Grigorovich IP-1
- Grigorovich IP-2
- Grigorovich IP-4
- Grigorovich LK-3
- Grigorovich LSh
- Grigorovich M-1
- Grigorovich M-2
- Grigorovich M-3
- Grigorovich M-4
- Grigorovich M-5
- Grigorovich M-6
- Grigorovich M-7
- Grigorovich M-8
- Grigorovich M-9
- Grigorovich M-10
- Grigorovich M-11
- Grigorovich M-12
- Grigorovich M-13
- Grigorovich M-14
- Grigorovich M-15
- Grigorovich M-16
- Grigorovich M-17
- Grigorovich M-18
- Grigorovich M-19
- Grigorovich M-20
- Grigorovich M-21
- Grigorovich M-22
- Grigorovich M-24
- Grigorovich M-24bis
- Grigorovich ROM-1
- Grigorovich ROM-2
- Grigorovich MK-1
- Grigorovich MRL
- Grigorovich MR-2
- Grigorovich MR-3
- Grigorovich MR-5
- Grigorovich MT
- Grigorovich MUR-1
- Grigorovich MU-2
- Grigorovich MUR-2
- Grigorovich IP-1
- Grigorovich PB-1
- Grigorovich Stal-MAI
- Grigorovich SUVP
- Grigorovich TB-5
- Grigorovich TSh-1
- Grigorovich TSh-2

=== Grinnell-Robinson ===
(Grinnell Aeroplane Co (fdr: William C "Nilly" Robinson), Grinnell, IA)

- Grinnell-Robinson 1916 Biplane
- Grinnell-Robinson 1915 Scout

=== Grinvalds ===
(Jean Grinvalds)

- Grinvalds G.801 Orion
- Grinvalds G.802 Orion

=== Grizodubov ===
(Stepan Vasilyevich Grizodubov)

- Grizodubov No.1 (Wright copy)
- Grizodubov No.2
- Grizodubov No.3
- Grizodubov No.4 1912 monoplane
- Grizodubov 1940 powered glider

=== Grob ===
(Burkhart Grob / Grob Aerospace / Grob Aircraft)

- Grob G 102 Astir, Astir Jeans, Astir 77, Astir Club
- Grob G 103 Twin, Twin II, Twin II Acro, Twin III
- Grob G 109
- Grob G 110
- Grob G 111
- Grob G 112
- Grob G 115
- Grob G 116
- Grob G 120
- Grob G 140
- Grob GF 200
- Grob G 520 Egrett / Strato 1
- Grob Ranger
- Grob Strato 2C
- Grob Tutor
- Grob Vigilant

=== Groen ===
(Groen Brothers Aviation, Salt Lake City, UT, 2001: Glendale, AZ)

- Groen Hawk I
- Groen Hawk II
- Groen Hawk 4
- Groen Hawk V
- Groen Jet Hawk 4T
- Groen Heliplane
- Groen GyroLiner
- Groen GyroLifter
- DARPA Heliplane
- Groen ArrowHawk
- Groen ShadowHawk
- Groen Hawk Point Five
- Groen Hawk 1
- Groen H2X
- Groen RevCon 6-X

=== Grokhovskii ===
- Grokhovskii Inflatable
- Grokhovskii Kukuracha
- Grokhovskii G-26
- Grokhovskii G-31
- Grokhovskii G-37
- Grokhovskii G-38
- Grokhovskii LK-2
- Grokhovskii G-61
- Grokhovskii G-63
- Grokhovskii GN-4
- Grokhovskii GN-8

=== Gropp ===
( Herbert Gropp)

- Gropp Zaunkönig

=== Groppius ===
- Groppius GAZ-5

=== Groppo ===
(Ing Nando Groppo srl)

- Groppo XL
- Groppo Trial

=== Gros-Bredelet ===
(Louis Gros and James Bredelet)

- Gros-bredelet GB-01

=== Gross ===
(John Gross)

- Gross JG-2

=== Grosso Aircraft ===
- Grosso Aircraft Easy Eagle 1

=== Grudieaire ===
- Grudieaire GH-4

=== Grulich ===
(Karl Grulich / Deutsche Aero LLoyd)

- Fokker-Grulich F.II
- Fokker-Grulich F.III
- Grulich S.1

=== Grumman ===
- Grumman A-6 Intruder
- Grumman A-9 Goose
- Grumman A-12 Duck
- Grumman A-13 Goose
- Grumman A-14 Widgeon
- Grumman A-16 Albatross
- Grumman AF Guardian
- Grumman AO-1 Mohawk
- Grumman A2F Intruder
- Grumman C-1 Trader
- Grumman C-2 Greyhound
- Grumman C-4
- Grumman C-11
- Grumman C-103
- Grumman E-1 Tracer
- Grumman E-2 Hawkeye
- Grumman EA-6 Prowler
- Grumman F-9 Cougar
- Grumman F-11 Tiger
- Grumman F-14 Tomcat
- Grumman F-111
- Grumman F-111 Aardvark
- Grumman F-111B Interceptor
- Grumman FF Fifi
- Grumman F2F
- Grumman F3F
- Grumman F4F Wildcat
- Grumman F5F Skyrocket
- Grumman F6F Hellcat
- Grumman F7F Tigercat
- Grumman F8F Bearcat
- Grumman F9F Panther
- Grumman F9F Cougar
- Grumman F10F Jaguar
- Grumman F11F Tiger
- Grumman F11F-1F Super Tiger
- Grumman F12F
- Grumman Future Air Attack Vehicle
- Grumman JF Duck
- Grumman J2F Duck
- Grumman J3F Goose
- Grumman J4F Widgeon
- Grumman JRF Goose
- Grumman JR2F Albatross
- Grumman Model 623
- Grumman OA-9 Goose
- Grumman OA-12 Duck
- Grumman OA-13 Goose
- Grumman OA-14 Widgeon
- Grumman OF Mohawk
- Grumman OV-1 Mohawk
- Grumman P-50
- Grumman P-65
- Grumman S-2 Tracker
- Grumman SF
- Grumman S2F Tracker
- Grumman SBF
- Grumman TBF Avenger
- Grumman TB2F
- Grumman TB3F
- Grumman TBM-3W Avenger
- Grumman TF Trader
- Grumman TSF
- Grumman HU-16 Albatross
- Grumman UF Albatross
- Grumman WF
- Grumman W2F
- Grumman X-29
- Grumman AXG
- Grumman Navy Experimental Type G Carrier Fighter
- Grumman American AA-1B Trainer
- Grumman American AA-5 Traveler
- Grumman American AA-5A Cheetah
- Grumman American AA-5B Tiger
- Grumman American GA-7 Cougar
- Grumman American Tr-2
- American General AG-5B Tiger
- Grumman Goblin
- Grumman G-3
- Grumman G-5
- Grumman G-6
- Grumman G-7
- Grumman G-8
- Grumman G-10
- Grumman G-11
- Grumman G-15
- Grumman G-16
- Grumman G-18
- Grumman G-20
- Grumman G-21 Goose
- Grumman G-22 Gulfhawk II
- Grumman G-23
- Grumman G-32 Gulfhawk III
- Grumman G-34
- Grumman G-36
- Grumman G-44 Widgeon
- Grumman G-50
- Grumman G-51
- Grumman G-52
- Grumman G-58 Bearcat
- Grumman G-63 Kitten
- Grumman G-65 Tadpole
- Grumman G-66 XTSF
- Grumman G-72 Kitten II
- Grumman G-73 Mallard
- Grumman G-75 Panther
- Grumman G-79
- Grumman G-81
- Grumman G-83
- Grumman G-89
- Grumman G-93
- Grumman G-98
- Grumman G-98J
- Grumman G-99
- Grumman G-118
- Grumman G-134
- Grumman G-159 Gulfstream I
- Grumman G-1159 Gulfstream II
- Grumman G-164 Ag-Cat
- Grumman G-303 Tomcat
- Grumman GG
- Grumman Gulfstream II
- Grumman Gulfstream III
- Grumman Gulfstream IV
- Grumman LXG1
- Grumman CSR-110 Albatross RCAF / Canadian Armed Forces
- Grumman CP-121 Tracker RCN / Canadian Armed Forces
- Grumman CS2F Tracker RCN

=== Gruse ===
(Maschinenfabrik August Gruse)

- Gruse Bo 15/1

=== Grushin ===
- Sh-Tandem
- BB-MAI
- Gr-1
- IS

=== Grzmilas ===
(Tadeusz Grzmilas)

- Grzmilas Orkan II

=== GT-Gyroplanes ===
(GT-Gyroplanes P/L, Moama, New South Wales, Australia)

- GT-Gyroplanes Kruza

=== Guangzhou Orlando Helicopters ===
- Guangzhou (Orlando) Panda

=== Guarani ===
(AeroTalleres Guarani SrL / Joseph Repka and Walter Kusy Fagundez)

- Guarani Paraguay 1

=== Guardian ===
(Guardian Aircraft Co (Pres: Derek White), 3008 S Jefferson Ave, St Louis, MO)

- Guardian 200

=== Gudkov ===
- Gudkov K-37
- Gudkov Gu-82
- Gudkov Gu-1
- Gudkov Gu-37

=== Guédon ===
- Guédon Monoplan

=== Guelton ===
(Humbert Guelton)

- Guelton HG.2

=== Guépard II ===
(Guépard II Team)

- Guépard II XJ01

=== Guerchais ===
- Guerchais 5
- Guerchais 6
- Guerchais 9
- Guerchais 12
- Guerchais Stratosphere

=== Guerchais-Henriot ===
(Louis Guerchais & Henriot)

- Guerchais-Henriot T-2

=== Guerchais-Roche ===
(Louis Guerchais & François Roche / Établissements Roche-Aviation)

- Guerchais-Roche T.25
- Guerchais-Roche T-30
- Guerchais-Roche T-35
- Guerchais-Roche T-35/I
- Guerchais-Roche T-35-II
- Guerchais-Roche T-39
- Guerchais-Roche T-39-II
- Guerchais-Roche T-55
- Guerchais-Roche GR-70
- Guerchais-Roche GR-105
- Guerchais-Roche GR-107
- Guerchais 110 Avion Stratosphérique

=== Guerchais-Schwander ===
- Guerchais-Schwander T-55

=== Guerpont ===
(Maurice Guerpont, Pulonu, France)

- Guerpont Autoplum

=== Guggenmos ===
(Drachenbau Josef Guggenmos, Kaufbeuren, Germany)

- Guggenmos Bullet
- Guggenmos ESC

=== Guilie ===
(Christian Guilie)

- Guilie CAP TR

=== Guillemin ===
(Jean Guillemin)

- Guillemin Sportplane
- Guillemin JG.10
- Guillemin JG.40
- Guillemin JG.41
- Guillemin JG.42
- Guillemin JG.43

=== Guimbal ===
(Hélicoptères Guimbal)

- Guimbal G2 Cabri

=== Guizhou ===
(Guizhou Aircraft Industry Corp.)

- Guizhou JJ-7
- Guizhou FT-7
- Guizhou JL-9
- Guizhou JL-9G
- EV-97
- Guizhou WZ-7 Soaring Dragon
- Guizhou Soar Eagle
- Guizhou FTC-2000 Mountain Eagle
- Guizhou FTC-2000G

=== Guldentops ===
(Etablissement Jef Guldentops)

- Bulté-Guldentops trainer
- Guldentops Saint Michel SG-2

=== Gulfstream ===
- Gulfstream Aerospace C-4 Academe—Gulfstream
- Gulfstream Aerospace C-11 Gulfstream II
- Gulfstream Aerospace C-20 Gulfstream III
- Gulfstream Aerospace C-37 Gulfstream V
- Gulfstream Aerospace Gulfstream IV
- Gulfstream Aerospace Gulfstream V
- Gulfstream Aerospace Jetprop
- Gulfstream Aerospace Turbo Commander
- Gulfstream G100
- Gulfstream G200
- Gulfstream G400NG
- Gulfstream G550/IAI Eitam
- Gulfstream G650
- Gulfstream G700
- Gulfstream G750
- Gulfstream American AA-1C Lynx
- Gulfstream American AA-5A Cheetah
- Gulfstream American AA-5B Tiger
- Gulfstream American GA-7 Cougar
- Gulfstream American 112
- Gulfstream American 114
- Gulfstream American Hustler
- Gulfstream Peregrine
- Gulfstream Peregrine 600
- Gulfstream X-54

=== Gumieniuk ===
- Gumieniuk 1911 aircraft

=== Gunderson ===
(Thomas Gunderson, Twin Valley, MN)

- Gunderson Model 1

=== Guritzer-van Nes ===
(Guritzer & van Nes)

- Guritzer van Nes A.I
- Guritzer van Nes A.II
- Guritzer van Nes A.III

=== Guthier ===
(Guthier Airplane Co Inc, 33 S Market St, Chicago, IL)

- Guthier H-249
- Guthier 1928 Monoplane

=== Guyard ===
- Guyard 1911 Monoplane

=== Gweduck Aircraft ===
(Renton, WA)

- Gweduck Aircraft Gweduck

=== GWH ===
(G W Heinemann, Bellingham, WA)

- GWH Special

=== Gwinn ===
((Joseph Marr) Gwinn Aircar Co, Buffalo, NY)

- Gwinn Aircar

=== Gyro-Cycle ===
(Wayne University, Detroit, MI)

- Gyro-Cycle 1936 Human-powered Helicopter

=== Gyro-Kopp-Ters ===
(Gyro-Kopp-Ters, Lake City, FL)

- Gyro-Kopp-Ters Midnight Hawk
- Gyro-Kopp-Ters Twin Eagle

=== Gyrodyne ===
(Gyrodyne Co of America (Pres: Peter J Papadakos), Hicksville, NY)

- Gyrodyne GCA-2
- Gyrodyne GCA-5 Gyrodyne
- Gyrodyne GCA-7 Helidyne
- Gyrodyne Model GCA-55 (actually an air-cushion vehicle - added for completeness)
- Gyrodyne GCA-59 Rotorcycle
- Gyrodyne QH-50 DASH (DASH - destroyer anti-submarine helicopter)
- Gyrodyne HOG
- Gyrodyne DSN
- Gyrodyne RON

=== Gyroflug ===
- Gyroflug Speed Canard

=== Gyropter ===
(American Gyropter Co, Cincinnati, OH)

- Gyropter 1928 Autogyro

=== Gyroplane ===
(Pennsylvania Aircraft Syndicate Ltd. / E. Burke Wilford)

- Gyroplane XOZ-1

=== Gyroplane ===
(Société Français du Gyroplane)

- Gyroplane G-20

=== GyroTec ===
(GyroTec Michael Obermaier, Wörth am Rhein, Germany)

- GyroTec DF02

_____
