= Michael Gregor =

Michael Gregor may refer to:

- Michael Gregor (aircraft engineer) (1888–1953), aircraft engineer of Georgian origin
- Michael Gregor (musician), Austrian musician

== See also ==
- Michael Greger (born 1972), American physician who promotes a plant-based diet
