= T35 =

T35 may refer to:

== Aviation ==
- De Havilland DH.115 Vampire T.35, an American trainer aircraft
- ENAER T-35 Pillán, a Chilean trainer aircraft
- Guerchais-Roche T.35, a French monoplane
- Slingsby T.35 Austral, a British glider
- Temco T-35 Buckaroo, an American trainer aircraft
- Wright T35, an American turboprop engine

== Other uses ==
- T-35, a Soviet tank
- T35 (classification), a disability sport classification
- Bugatti Type 35, a French racing car
- German torpedo boat T35
- Nagahara Station (Osaka), Japan
- T35, a prototype for the American M10 tank destroyer
