= Guyart =

Guyart is a surname. Notable people with the name include:

- Astrid Guyart (born 1983), French female fencer
- Brice Guyart (born 1981), French male fencers
- Mary of the Incarnation Guyart (1599-1672), saint nun

== See also ==
- Édifice Marie-Guyart, previously and still commonly known as Complexe G, is a 31-storey, 132 m (433 ft) office skyscraper completed in 1972 in Quebec City, Canada
- Guyart des Moulins, was a medieval monk
- Guyard
