= Gribovsky G-10 =

General information
- Type: Single seat sports aircraft
- National origin: USSR
- Designer: Vladislav Gribovsky
- Number built: 1

History
- First flight: 1933

The Gribovsky G-10 (Russian: ГРИБОВСКИЙ Г-10) was a single seat sports aircraft designed and built in the USSR in the early 1930s.

== Design and development ==
Although the G-10 incorporated many structural feature from the earlier Gribovsky G-8 and later in its career had the same engine, it was a braced high wing monoplane rather than a low wing, cantilever design. The G-10's two spar wing was supported over the central fuselage on a very low, faired pylon and braced to the lower fuselage on each side by a V-form pair of faired struts.

Like the G-8, the G-10 had a smoothly rounded, plywood skinned monocoque fuselage. It was initially powered by a 65 hp (48 kW), three cylinder Russian M-23 radial engine mounted in the short nose section. This was carefully streamlined and integrated smoothly with the spinner of the two blade propeller, though the cylinders protruded for cooling. Later, this engine was replaced by a 60 hp (45 kW), five cylinder Walter NZ-60 radial, the same type used by the G-8, which slightly lightened the aircraft.

The G-10 had a large cut-out in the wing trailing edge over the open cockpit, from which the pilot could see both below and above the wing. The tailplane was positioned on top of the fuselage and braced from below with two parallel struts. The fin was almost triangular though it rounded at the top into a broad, curved, deep unbalanced rudder which extended down to the keel. The G-10 had a fixed tail skid undercarriage; each of the main wheels, enclosed in broad spats, was hinged on a pair of V-form struts to the central fuselage with a vertical, faired shock absorber from the axle to the central fuselage.

The G-10 was constructed at GAZ-1 (the state aviation factory at Moscow Khodynka Aerodrome or Central Moscow Airfield) in 1933.

== Specifications (M-23 engine) ==
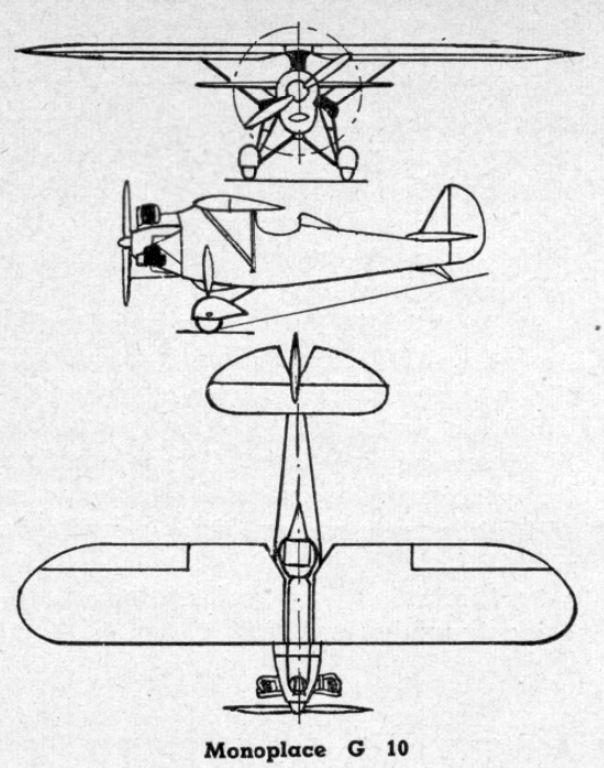
Gribovsky G-10

Data from Gunston (1995) p.78

General characteristics

- Crew: One
- Length: 5.6 m (18 ft 4 in)
- Wingspan: 8.4 m (27 ft 7 in)
- Wing area: 11 m^{2} (120 sq ft)
- Empty weight: 335 kg (739 lb)
- Gross weight: 510 kg (1,124 lb)
- Fuel capacity: 75 kg (165 lb)
- Powerplant: 1 × M-23 3-cylinder radial engine, 48 kW (65 hp)
- Propellers: 2-bladed

Performance

- Maximum speed: 170 km/h (110 mph, 92 kn)
- Range: 700 km (430 mi, 380 nmi) ; 1,300 km (810 mi; 700 nmi) with overload fuel
- Service ceiling: 5,200 m (17,100 ft)
- Time to altitude: 11 min to 2,000 m (6,560 ft)
- Take-off distance: 100 m (330 ft)
- Landing distance: 80 m (260 ft)
