= Moscow Aviation Institute BB-MAI =

BB-MAI

General information
- Type: light bomber attack aircraft
- National origin: Soviet Union
- Manufacturer: Moscow Aviation Institute
- Designer: Peter Grushin
- Status: prototype only
- Number built: 1

History
- First flight: 1940

The Moscow Aviation Institute BB-MAI (Russian: ББ-МАИ) was a Soviet light bomber/attack plane prototype aircraft. Designed in 1939 by Peter Grushin of the Moscow Aviation Institute (MAI, hence the designation), it was delayed by problems with the new Klimov M-105 engine and eventually only a single prototype was built. While the design was not accepted for serial production, it was the first Soviet aircraft to use a tricycle landing gear and one of the first to feature a supercharger and leading-edge slats.

== Design and development ==
The work on the design was started in 1938, but was delayed by the fact that the intended powerplant, the modern Klimov M-105 engine, was still under development. In early 1939 work commenced on the first prototype, but proceeded at a very slow pace. The construction team was led by A.A. Lebedinski and A.A. Manucharov. It was not until late 1940 that the prototype was completed and flight-tested by MAI's own test pilot A.N. Grinchik. By that time the Soviet Air Forces lost interest in the design and focused on the more advanced Ilyushin Il-2 instead. As neither this design nor the even more revolutionary Sh-MAI were accepted, the Design Bureau of the Moscow Aviation Institute was disbanded and its head Pyotr Grushin was sent to Kharkov as the new head of a local Aircraft Factory No. 135.

The two-spar wings of BB-MAI were of mixed construction typical to other Soviet experimental designs of the era. Each wing was equipped with leading-edge slats and was composed of three crescent-shaped caisson sections, each formed of fanera – layers of plywood strengthened with glue and bakelite. The fuselage was a typical wooden monocoque reinforced with fanera. The materials used in the BB-MAI were designed at the VIAM Institute. The relatively small wings resulted in relatively high wing loading to maximise the aircraft's cruising speed.

The engine was equipped with a new experimental TsIAM supercharger powered by exhaust fumes. The aircraft was equipped with a modern tricycle landing gear, with the front wheel retracting into a bay in front of the engine's radiator, while main gears retracted into wing bays close to the fuselage.

== Specifications (BB-MAI) ==
Data from Volkov, op. cit.

General characteristics

- Crew: 2
- Length: 9.60 m (31 ft 6 in)
- Wingspan: 10.00 m (32 ft 10 in)
- Wing area: 15.20 m^{2} (163.6 sq ft)
- Empty weight: 2,965 kg (6,537 lb)
- Max takeoff weight: 3,490 kg (7,694 lb)
- Powerplant: 1 × Klimov M-105 V12 liquid-cooled piston engine, 780 kW (1,050 hp)

Performance

- Maximum speed: 550 km/h (340 mph, 300 kn)
- Range: 500 km (310 mi, 270 nmi)
- Service ceiling: 9,000 m (30,000 ft)
- Wing loading: 210 kg/m^{2} (43 lb/sq ft)
