= Golden Avio F30 =

Italian ultralight aircraft

F30
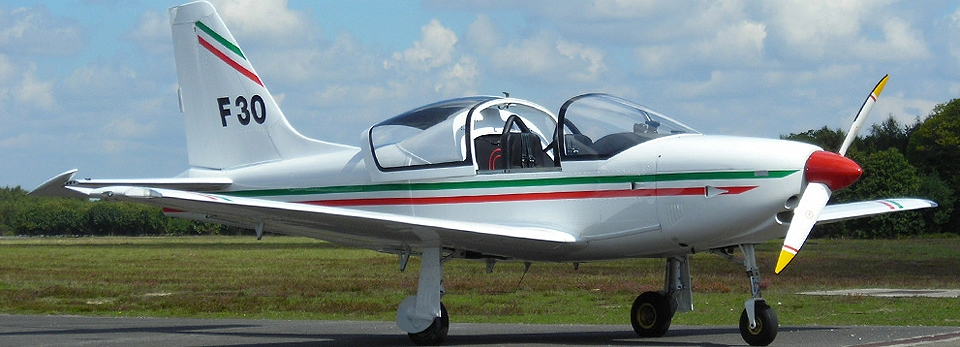
- F30 RG model

General information
- Type: Ultralight aircraft
- National origin: Italy
- Manufacturer: Golden Avio
- Designer: Stelio Frati
- Status: In production (2012)

The Golden Avio F30 is an Italian ultralight aircraft designed by Stelio Frati and produced by Golden Avio, a division of Golden Car, an automotive parts and prototyping company located in Caramagna Piemonte. The aircraft is supplied as a kit for amateur construction or as a complete ready-to-fly-aircraft.

The aircraft's designation is a homage to the Ferrari F40 Italian automobile built from 1987 to 1992.

== Design and development ==
The aircraft was designed to comply with the Fédération Aéronautique Internationale microlight rules. It features a cantilever low-wing, a two-seats-in-side-by-side configuration enclosed cockpit under a bubble canopy, fixed or retractable tricycle landing gear and a single engine in tractor configuration.

The aircraft is made from sheet aluminum. Its 8.6 m (28.2 ft) span wing has an area of 10.6 m^{2} (114 sq ft) and mounts flaps. The standard engine available is the 100 hp (75 kW) Rotax 912ULS four-stroke powerplant, although it can accommodate engines of up to 200 hp (149 kW).

The FG model received German certification in 2011 and the RG version in 2015.

== Variants ==
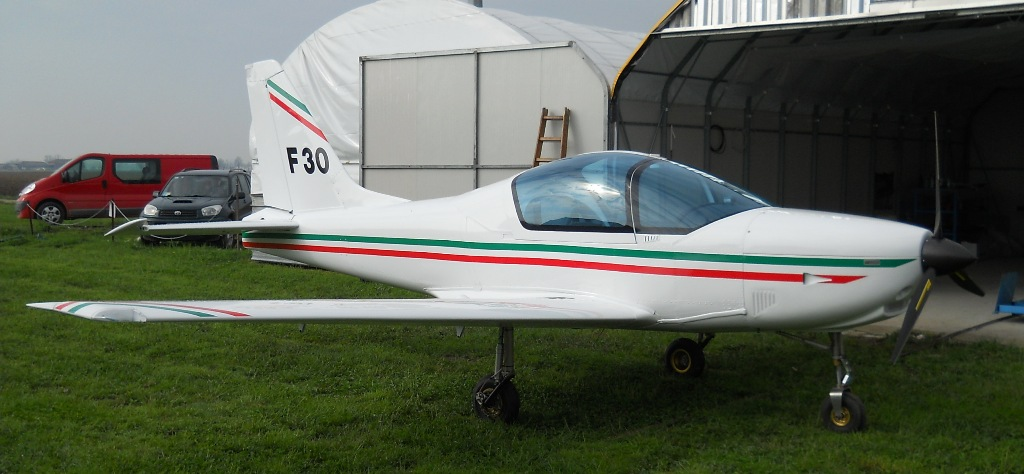
Golden Avio F30 FG

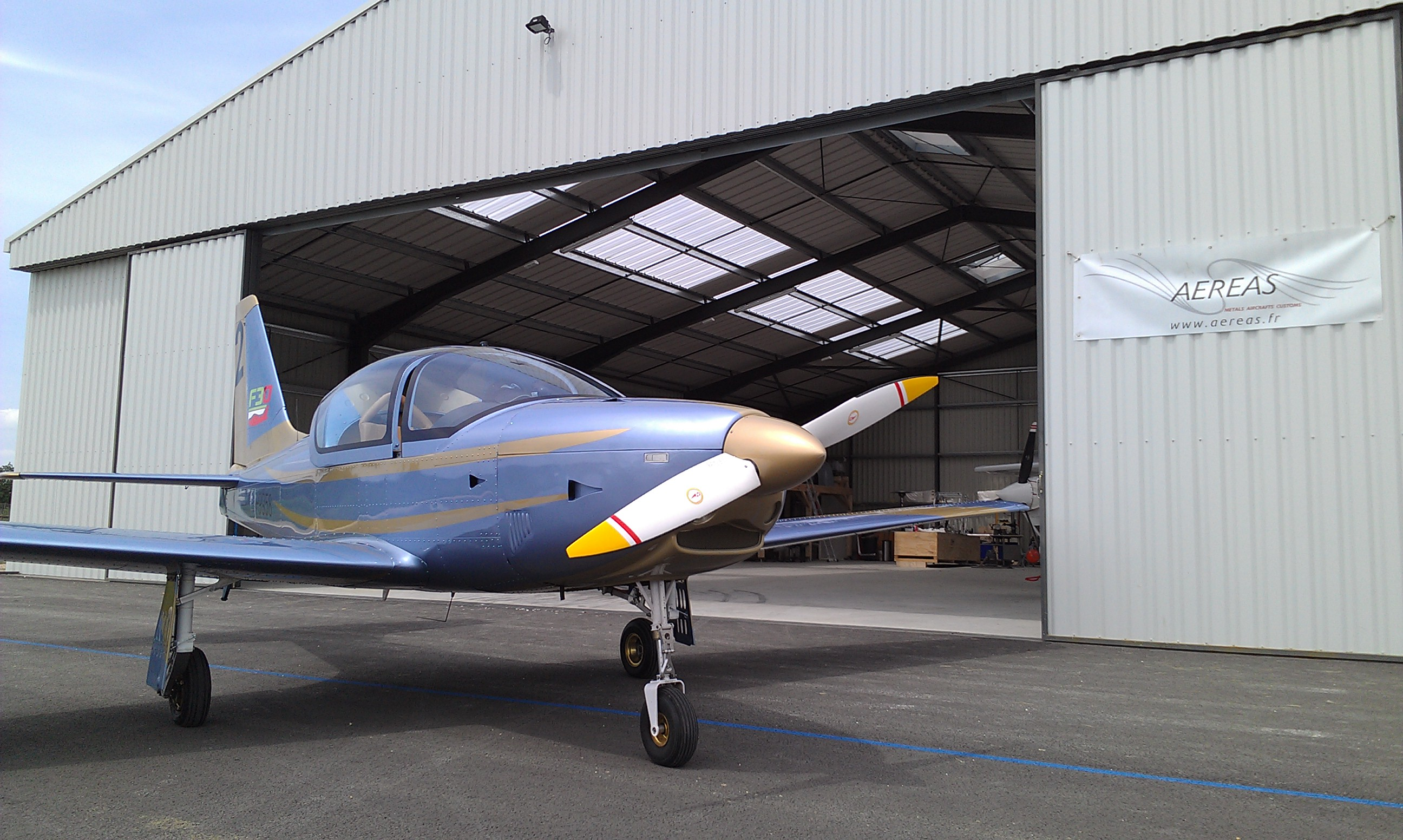
Golden Avio F30 RG

F30 RG
Retractable landing gear model.
F30 FG
Fixed landing gear model, also called the Brio.

== Specifications (F30 RG) ==
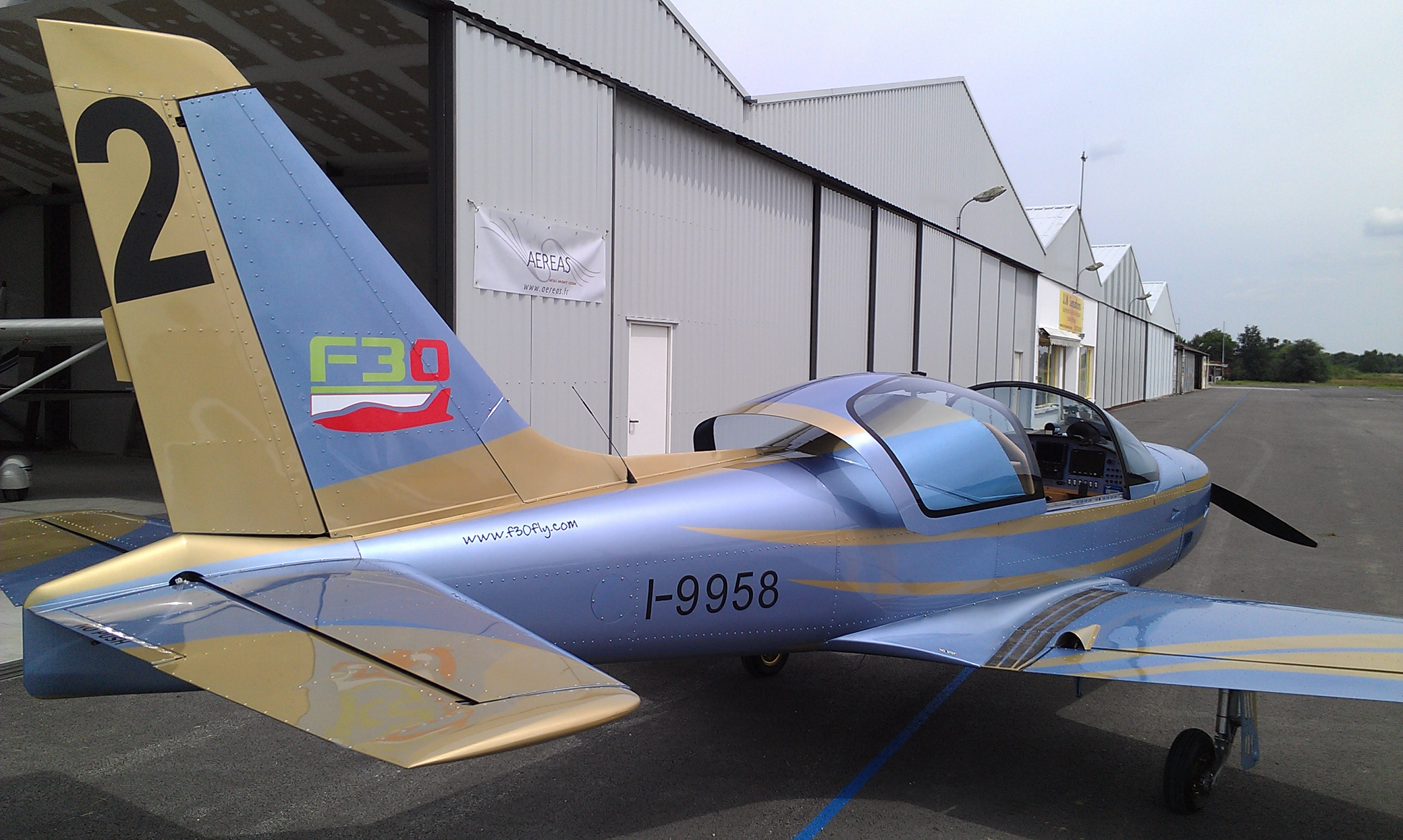
Golden Avio F30 RG

Data from Bayerl and Golden Car

General characteristics

- Crew: one
- Capacity: one passenger
- Length: 6.8 m (22 ft 4 in)
- Wingspan: 8.6 m (28 ft 3 in)
- Height: 2.6 m (8 ft 6 in)
- Wing area: 10.6 m^{2} (114 sq ft)
- Empty weight: 289 kg (637 lb)
- Gross weight: 472.5 kg (1,042 lb)
- Fuel capacity: 95 litres (21 imp gal; 25 US gal)
- Powerplant: 1 × Rotax 912ULS four cylinder, liquid and air-cooled, four stroke aircraft engine, 75 kW (101 hp)
- Propellers: 2-bladed GT Propellers G2T VEB, variable pitch

Performance

- Maximum speed: 240 km/h (150 mph, 130 kn)
- Cruise speed: 220 km/h (140 mph, 120 kn)
- Stall speed: 65 km/h (40 mph, 35 kn) flaps down
- Range: 1,200 km (750 mi, 650 nmi)
- Service ceiling: 5,600 m (18,400 ft)
- g limits: +4.4/-2.2
- Rate of climb: 6.1 m/s (1,200 ft/min)
- Wing loading: 44.6 kg/m^{2} (9.1 lb/sq ft)
