= GoFly Gotar =

French autogyro

Gotar

General information
- Type: Autogyro
- National origin: France
- Manufacturer: GoFly Aeronatique
- Status: Development ended (2016)

History
- First flight: Pending (2015)

The GoFly Gotar is a French autogyro that was designed by and was under development by GoFly Aeronatique of Boves, Somme, introduced in 2013. The aircraft was intended to be supplied to customers complete and ready-to-fly.

The company seems to have been founded about 2013 and gone out of business in 2016. It is unclear whether any examples were completed and flown.

== Design and development ==
The Gotar has a fuselage design that can be finished as an autogyro with an unpowered rotor, a helicopter with a powered rotor, or as an ultralight trike with a hang glider-type wing fitted. The autogyro version was developed first and it seems unlikely that other versions were completed.

As an autogyro the Gotar features a single main rotor, a two-seats-in tandem open cockpit with a windshield, tricycle landing gear without wheel pants, plus a tail caster and a four-cylinder, 16 valve, air-cooled, four stroke 100 hp (75 kW) Vija J-10Si engine in pusher configuration.

The aircraft fuselage is made from metal tubing, with a small cockpit fairing and a curved windshield that continues over the seats to the rotor mast. Its two-bladed rotor has a diameter of 8.4 m (27.6 ft). The aircraft has a typical empty weight of 245 kg (540 lb) and a gross weight of 450 kg (992 lb), giving a useful load of 205 kg (452 lb). With full fuel of 70 litres (15 imp gal; 18 US gal) the payload for the pilot, passenger and baggage is 155 kg (342 lb).

The design was first promoted on the company website in 2013, but had reportedly not flown by 2015. The company website was removed at the end of 2016. The company presumably no longer exists and Gotar development ended.

== Specifications (Gotar) ==
Data from Tacke

General characteristics

- Crew: one
- Capacity: one passenger
- Empty weight: 245 kg (540 lb)
- Gross weight: 450 kg (992 lb)
- Fuel capacity: two 35 litres (7.7 imp gal; 9.2 US gal) tanks, for a total of 70 litres (15 imp gal; 18 US gal)
- Powerplant: 1 × Vija J-10Si four-cylinder, 16 valve, air-cooled, four stroke aircraft engine, 75 kW (100 hp)
- Main rotor diameter: 8.4 m (27 ft 7 in)
- Main rotor area: 55 m^{2} (590 sq ft)
- Propellers: 3-bladed ground adjustable

Performance

- Disk loading: 8.1 kg/m^{2} (1.7 lb/sq ft)

== See also ==
- List of rotorcraft
