= Grzmilas Orkan II =

Orkan II

General information
- Type: Single sear light aircraft
- National origin: Poland
- Manufacturer: Tadeusz Grzmilas
- Designer: Tadeusz Grzmilas
- Number built: 1

History
- First flight: 9 September 1928 or 5 October 1928

The Grzmilas Orkan II was a Polish one-off, single-seat sports aircraft. It came second in the second National Lightplane Contest held soon after its first flight, with outstanding take-off and climb characteristics. Its designer and builder continued to use it until 1939.

== Design and development ==
The Orkan (Whirlwind) II was the second aircraft designed by Tadeusz Grzmilas and followed the Orkan I, a glider. Grzmilas was serving in the Polish air force at Poznań and obtained permission to build it in the military workshops there during the 1927-8 winter, with the Second National Lightplane Contest, scheduled for late October 1928 in Warsaw, in mind. He took it on its first flight on either 9 September 1928 or 5 October 1928.

It had a two part, thick, constant thickness, rectangular plan, two spar wing either with plywood covering ahead of the forward spar and canvas covered behind or entirely fabric covered. Ailerons extended to the wing tips. Each half-wing was braced to the lower fuselage longerons by a pair of parallel, steel tube struts to the spars and supported at the central joint low over the fuselage on inverted V-struts.

The Orkan II was powered by a 45 hp (34 kW) Anzani six-cylinder radial engine which Grzmilas had won as a prize for his success at the Second Polish Glider Contest of 1925, flying the Orkan I. It was mounted uncowled via a rounded, light alloy covered nose to the rectangular section, wooden framed and ply covered fuselage. An open cockpit under the wing trailing edge w\s provided with a rounded cut-out for a better upward field of view. The horizontal tail, like the wing, was rectangular in plan and fabric covered. It was mounted on top of the fuselage and strut-braced on each side to the lower longeron; the elevators had a cut-out to allow movement of the rudder, which was fabric covered and rectangular in profile apart from its lower edge, angled for ground clearance. The fabric covered fin had a strongly cropped triangular profile.

The Orkan II's fixed, conventional landing gear had mainwheels joined by a single axle on steel tube V-struts from the lower fuselage longerons at the bottom of the wing struts, together with a tall tailskid.

Soon after its first flight, the Orkan II took part in the Second National Lightplane Contest. Flown by Grzmilas it gained second place overall, with first places for the shortest take-off (60 m (200 ft)) and for the greatest altitude reached in 30 minutes (3,650 m (11,980 ft)).

After the contest Grzmilas flew the Orkan from time to time during his service career, during which he was based at Dęblin, Kraków and Lublin. In September 1939 he stored it in the L.W.S. factory at Lublin where it was later destroyed.

== Specifications ==
Data from Cynk, 1971 except where noted

General characteristics

- Crew: One
- Length: 5.5 m (18 ft 1 in)
- Wingspan: 9 m (29 ft 6 in)
- Height: 2.1 m (6 ft 11 in)
- Wing area: 12.5 m^{2} (135 sq ft)
- Empty weight: 273 kg (602 lb)
- Gross weight: 393 kg (866 lb) normal loaded
- Powerplant: 1 × Anzani 6-cylinder radial, 34 kW (45 hp)
- Propellers: 2-bladed

Performance

- Maximum speed: 125 km/h (78 mph, 67 kn) at sea level
- Cruise speed: 110 km/h (68 mph, 59 kn)
- Stall speed: 70 km/h (43 mph, 38 kn) minimum speed
- Range: 400 km (250 mi, 220 nmi)
- Service ceiling: 4,500 m (14,800 ft)
- Rate of climb: 3.5 m/s (690 ft/min) initial
- Time to altitude: 30 min to 3,650 m (11,980 ft)
- Take-off distance: 60 m (200 ft)
