= Gotha B types =

German reconnaissance/trainer aircraft

The Gotha B types of the Gothaer Waggonfabrik were two-seat reconnaissance/trainer aircraft of the German Air Force in the First World War.

== Development ==
In 1914 Gotha developed a biplane with 120 hp inline engine, which received the factory designation LD.7 and was classified by Idflieg as Gotha B.I.

The B.II (factory designation LD.10) differed significantly from the B.I: The wings were larger, the fuselage shorter and a rotary engine was installed. The B.II was similar to an earlier concept, the Gotha LD.1 two-seater, which was powered by a Gnôme rotary engine with 100 hp.

== Operational history ==
18 B.Is were delivered and used until 1915 for reconnaissance, then as a trainer aircraft. The B.II, of which 10 were built, was also used as a trainer aircraft.

== Specifications ==
	B.I	B.II
Year	1915	1916
Type	Reconnaissance/trainer aircraft	Trainer aircraft
Wingspan	12.4m	14.5m
Length	8.4m	7.25m
Height	3m	3.45m
Wing area	39.5m²	46m²
Empty weight	725kg	525kg
Max. take off weight	1,125kg	1,127kg
Engine	Water-cooled 6-cylinder inline engine Mercedes D.II, 120 hp	Oberursel U.I rotary engine, 100 hp
Max. speed	125 km/h	115 km/h
Service ceiling	2,700m	N/A
Range	530 km	N/A
Armament	None	None
Crew	2	2
