= Godbille GJJ =

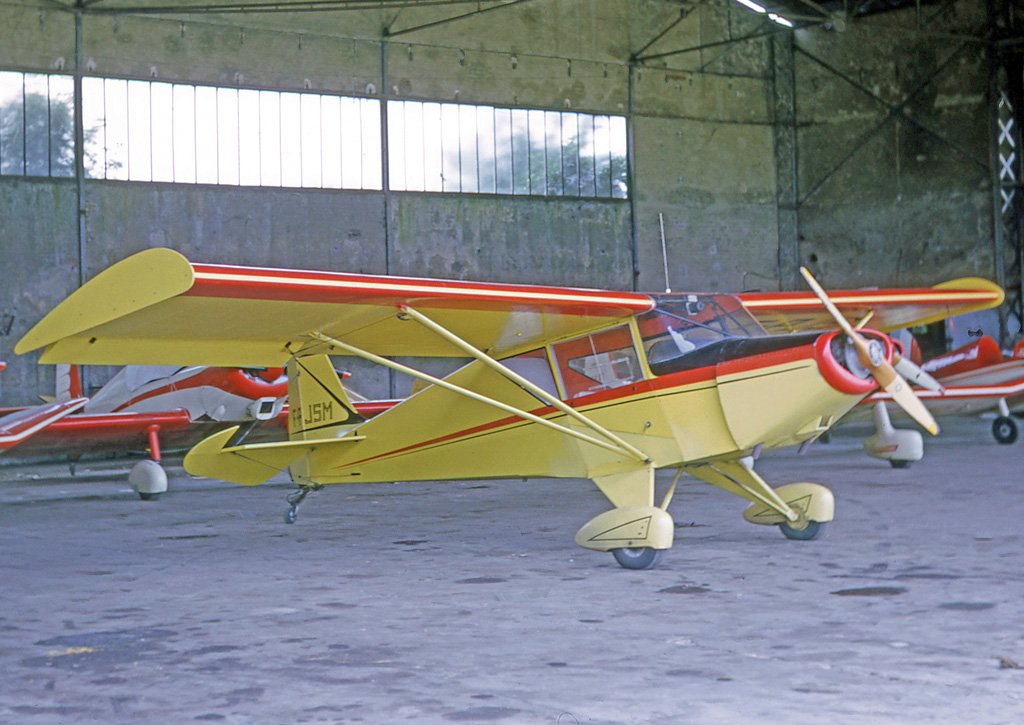

General information
- Type: Three seat light aircraft
- National origin: France
- Designer: Jacques and Jean Godbille
- Number built: 1

History
- First flight: December 1961

The Godbille GJJ is a French variant of the Piper PA-20 Pacer, first flown in 1961.

== Design ==
In 1961 Jacques and Jules Godbille built a three-seat light aircraft based on the structure of the Piper PA-20 Pacer. Powered by a 115 hp (86 kW) Lycoming O-235-C air-cooled flat four engine rather than the Pacer's more usual 125 hp (93 kW) Lycoming O-290-D, the closest Piper variant was the PA-20S 115. The engine cowlings of the Piper and Gobille are distinct, the latter having a wide open nose and a gap at its rear rather than merging smoothly into the fuselage. The Godbille's wing tips are square and fitted with tip plates, whereas the Piper's are rounded, and the Godbille's vertical tail is taller than the Piper's and straight edged rather than curved.

== Operational history ==
The sole Godbille GJJ was registered on 7 December 1961 and flew for the first time before the end of the year. The Godbilles retained it for a decade but after that it changed hands rapidly, with eight different owners before 1988. It remains on the French Civil Aircraft Register in 2014.
