= Gotha LD.1 =

LD.1, LD.2, LD.6, and LD.7
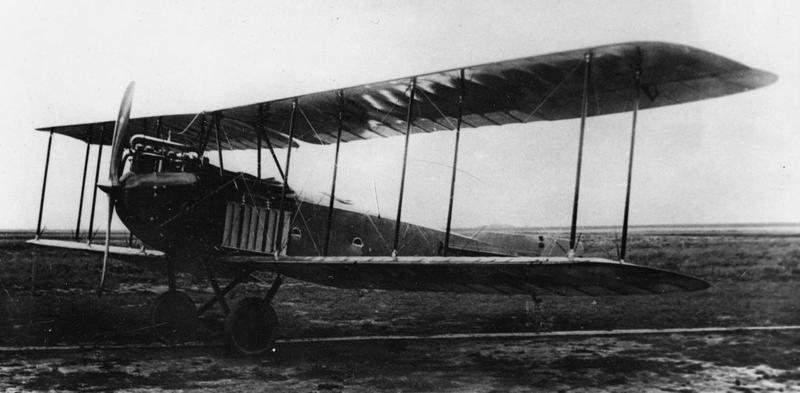
- Gotha LD.2

General information
- Type: Military utility aircraft
- National origin: Germany
- Manufacturer: Gotha
- Primary users: Luftstreitkräfte Ottoman aviation squadrons

History
- First flight: April 1914

The Gotha LD.1 (for Land Doppeldecker - "Land Biplane") and its derivatives were a family of military aircraft produced in Germany just before and during the early part of World War I. Used for training and reconnaissance, they were conventional designs with two-bay unstaggered wings, tailskid landing gear, and two open cockpits in tandem. Made quickly obsolete by the rapid advances in aviation technology, several were supplied as military aid to the Ottoman Empire when withdrawn from German service.

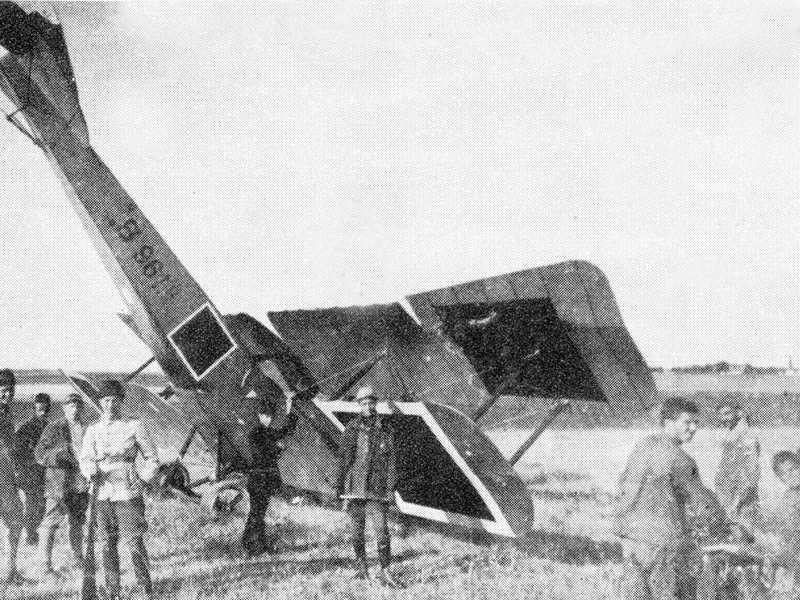
An LD.2 of the Ottoman Empire after nosing over

== Variants ==
LD.1
Basic open-cockpit biplane
LD.1a
1915 variant with a 100 hp (75 kW) Oberursel U.I rotary engine.
LD.2
Similar to the LD 1a but fitted with a 100 hp (75 kW) Mercedes D.I inline piston engine.
LD.6a
Minor changes and engine variations.
LD.7 (B.I)
Minor changes and fitted with a 120 hp (89 kW) Mercedes D.II inline piston engine.

== Operators ==
Germany

- Luftstreitkrafte

Turkey

- Ottoman Air Force

== Specifications (LD.1) ==
General characteristics

- Crew: 2
- Length: 8.28 m (27 ft 2 in)
- Wingspan: 14.5 m (47 ft 7 in)
- Height: 3.45 m (11 ft 4 in)
- Wing area: 46 m^{2} (500 sq ft)
- Empty weight: 590 kg (1,301 lb)
- Gross weight: 980 kg (2,161 lb)
- Powerplant: 1 × Mercedes D.I 6-cylinder water-cooled in-line piston engine, 78 kW (105 hp)
- Propellers: 2-bladed fixed-pitch propeller

Performance

- Maximum speed: 115 km/h (71 mph, 62 kn)
- Range: 520 km (320 mi, 280 nmi)

== See also ==
Related development

- Gotha LD.5
