= Grob G 110 =

G 110

General information
- Type: Light aircraft
- National origin: Germany
- Manufacturer: Grob Aircraft
- Number built: 2

History
- First flight: 6 February 1982

The Grob G 110 was a single-engined two-seat light aircraft, made mainly of glassfibre, that was designed and built by the German manufacturer Grob Aircraft in the early 1980s. Two prototypes were built, with the first example making its maiden flight on 6 February 1982, but development was abandoned after the first prototype crashed later that year.

== Design and development ==
In 1972, the German machine tool manufacturer, Burkhardt Grob Untermehnensbereich Maschinenbau, set up a subsidiary, Grob Flugzeugbau, to build aircraft. Grob Flugzeugbau started by building Schempp-Hirth Standard Cirrus gliders under license before switching to its own designs of gliders and motor gliders. In 1982 Grob revealed a more conventional powered light aircraft, the Grob G 110. This was a two-seat low-wing monoplane suitable for use as a training aircraft for flying clubs. It was powered by a single Lycoming O-235 piston engine rated at 88 kW (118 hp) and had a fixed tricycle landing gear. Pilot and passenger sat side by side in an enclosed cabin. Grob had considerable experience in composite aircraft construction from its years of using glassfibre in its Gliders, and the G 110 was largely built of glassfibre. The wings used an airfoil section designed to give laminar flow, in order to improve performance.

Two prototypes were built, with the first making its maiden flight on 6 February 1982. This aircraft crashed in August 1982 while testing the aircraft's spinning characteristics, when it could not be recovered from a flat spin, the test pilot escaping by parachute. Although testing continued with the second prototype, the type was abandoned without entering production with Grob designing a new two seat trainer, the Grob G 112. This too was a failure, as it was overweight, but the companies third attempt to enter the trainer market, the Grob G 115, flew in 1985.

== Variants ==
G 110
2-seat sporting aircraft
G 111
Proposed 4-seat development of the G110

== Specifications ==
Data from Jane's All the World's Aircraft 1982–83

General characteristics

- Crew: 2
- Length: 6.90 m (22 ft 8 in)
- Wingspan: 10.60 m (34 ft 9 in)
- Wing area: 12.20 m^{2} (131.3 sq ft)
- Aspect ratio: 9.2:1
- Airfoil: Eppler E789
- Empty weight: 560 kg (1,235 lb)
- Max takeoff weight: 900 kg (1,984 lb)
- Fuel capacity: 140 L (37 US gal; 31 imp gal)
- Powerplant: 1 × Avco Lycoming O-235-M1 air-cooled flat-four engine, 88 kW (118 hp)
- Propellers: 2-bladed Hoffmann HO-V72G constant-speed propeller

Performance

- Maximum speed: 280 km/h (170 mph, 150 kn)
- Cruise speed: 260 km/h (160 mph, 140 kn) at 2,000 m (6,600 ft) (75% power)
- Stall speed: 82 km/h (51 mph, 44 kn) (flaps down)
- Never exceed speed: 350 km/h (220 mph, 190 kn)
- Range: 1,200 km (750 mi, 650 nmi)
- Rate of climb: 4.80 m/s (945 ft/min)
