= Guerchais-Henriot T-2 =

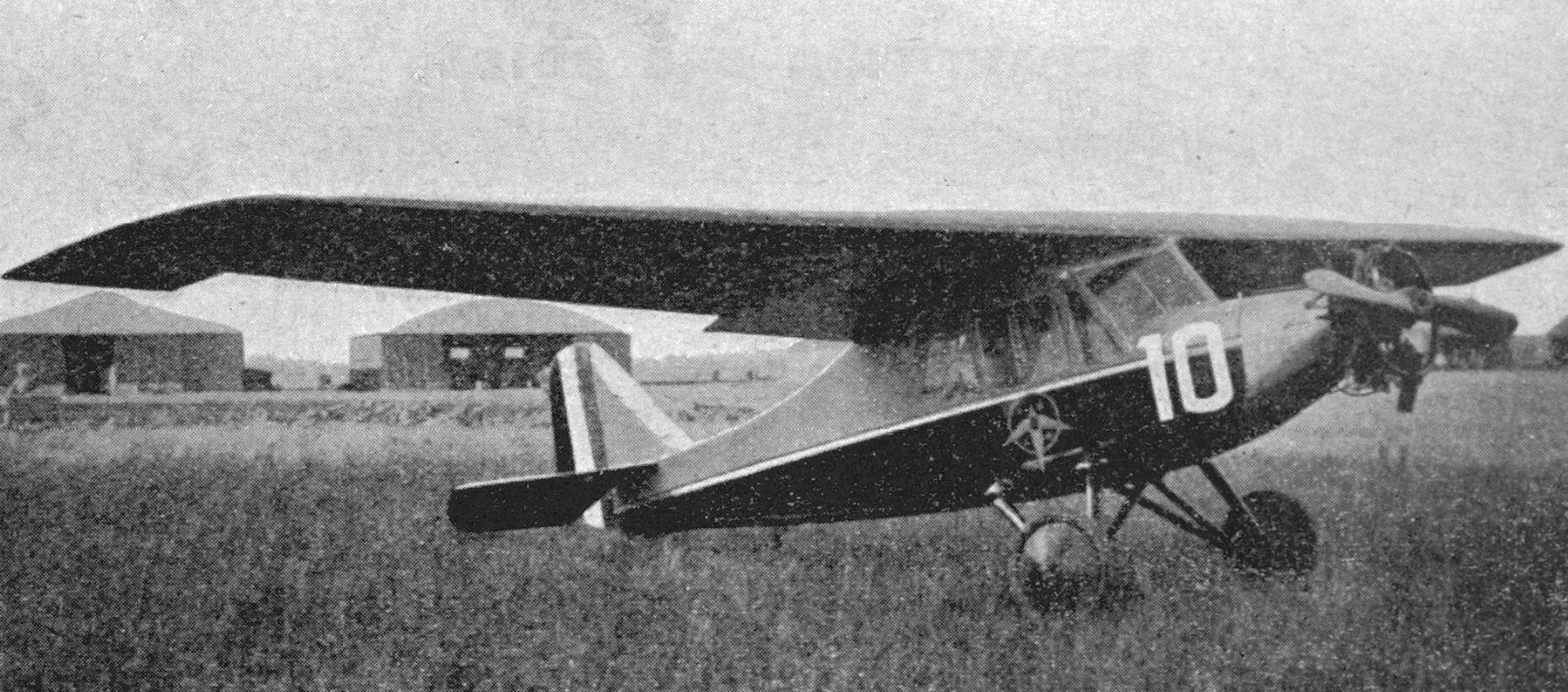

General information
- Type: Two-seat light aircraft
- National origin: France
- Manufacturer: Louis Guerchais
- Designer: Louis Guerchais
- Number built: 1

History
- First flight: Early September 1928
- Developed into: Guerchais-Henriot 5

The Guerchais-Henriot T-2 was a French low-power, two-seat cabin cantilever monoplane built in 1928. Only one was flown.

== Design and development ==
Louis Guerchais both designed and built the T-2, which was powered by a six-cylinder Anzani 6 radial engine fitted with a carburettor patented by Louis Henriot to deliver safety fuel supplied by Ferrié.

Its high wing was straight-tapered out to quadrantal tips and was built around five slender, cross-braced spars and plywood covered. Narrow chord ailerons at mid-span occupied more than half the trailing edges. Progressive thinning of the wing outwards from below provided light dihedral.

Like the wings, the fuselage was wooden, with six spruce longerons and ply surfacing. The Anzani engine had its cylinders uncowled, but its bearers were in an aluminium cowling back to a fire wall with the oil tank behind it. There were twin fuel tanks in the wing. A multi-windowed, enclosed cabin under the wing contained staggered seating for two, the pilot in front on the left and their passenger/co-pilot provided with dual control. There were doors on both sides of the cabin. Behind the cabin and the wing trailing edge, the upper fuselage fell away smoothly to the tail. The T-2 had a triangular fin carrying an almost constant chord rudder which reached down to the keel. Its tapered, round-tipped tailplane was mounted at the base of the fin and carried separate elevators with a cut-out for rudder movement. All the tail surfaces had wooden structures and the control surfaces were unbalanced.

The T-2 had fixed, conventional landing gear with a track of about 2 m (6 ft 7 in). The wheels were on cranked, steel split axles mounted on the fuselage central underside and enclosed in wooden streamlined fairings. The outer axle ends moved in slots at the ends of wooden V-struts from the lower fuselage longerons, restrained by rubber chord shock-absorbers. The articulated tailskid was wooden and steel shod, with another rubber shock-absorber joined to the fuselage.

In the summer of 1929 Guerchais shared first prize in the Le Challenge International de Tourisme (International Touring Contest) with the Guerchais 5, which was similar to the T-2 but had three seats and a 71 kW (95 hp) Salmson 7AC seven-cylinder radial engine.

== Operational history ==
The T-2 had been registered as a contestant in the Concours d'Avions légers de l'Association Française Aérienne (Light Aircraft Competition of the French Air Association), scheduled for mid-September 1928, before its first flight had been made. Unfortunately, this was delayed by problems with the certification of the Henriot carburettor. As a result the aircraft had left the factory only a few days before the competition began and pilot Pierre Lemerre had logged only 95 minutes flying, so it was not fully developed. In addition it was fitted with a propeller unmatched to the engine, requiring it to operate at reduced rpm and power. Though it was ranked sixth out of nine, it attracted interest as the French runner-up in a contest dominated by German and English designs, and as a comfortable, low-powered and aerodynamically clean cabin tourer.

In November 1928 it was at Villacoublay, undergoing official tests towards its Certificate of Airworthiness which was granted in March 1929. In July 1929 it took part in the Auvergne rally.

== Specifications ==
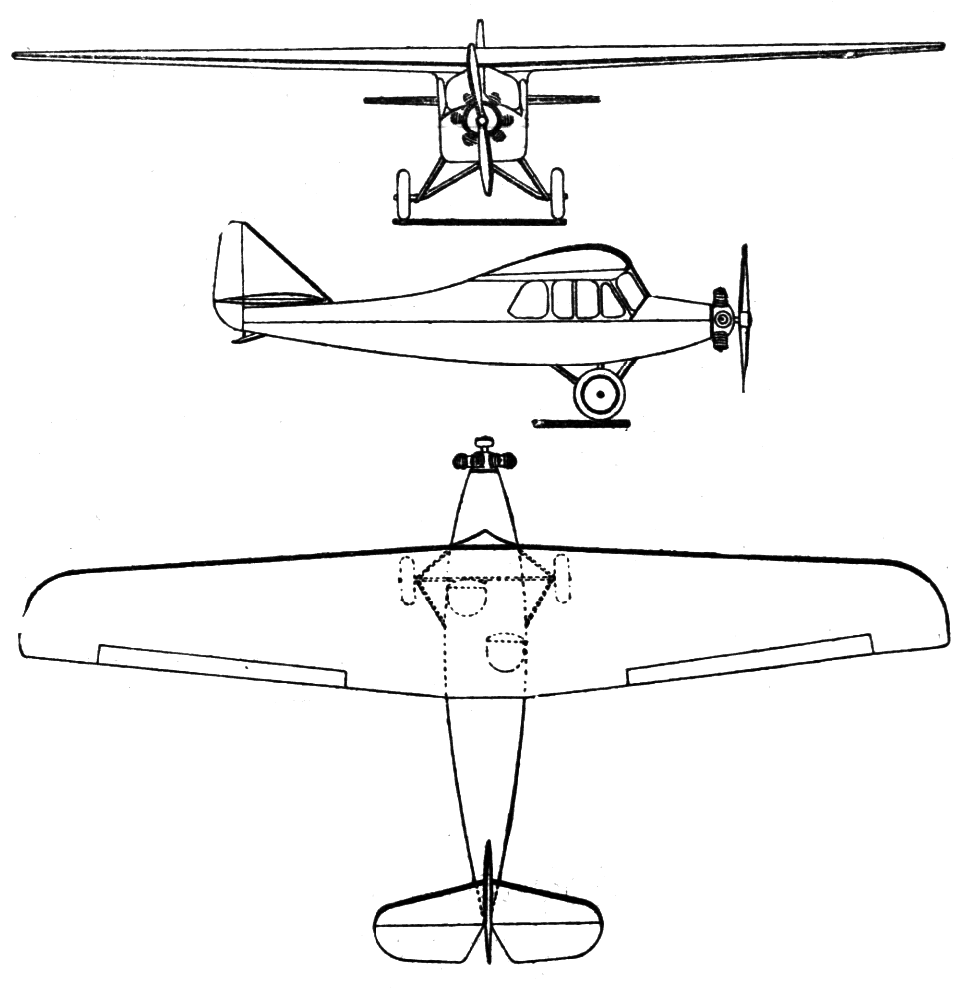
Guerchais-Henriot T-2 3-view drawing from Les Ailes November 1, 1928

Data from Les Ailes, November 1928 unless noted

General characteristics

- Crew: One
- Capacity: One passenger
- Length: 6.90 m (22 ft 8 in)
- Wingspan: 12 m (39 ft 4 in) 2.30
- Height: 2.30 m (7 ft 7 in)
- Wing area: 18 m^{2} (190 sq ft)
- Airfoil: Guerchais 369B
- Empty weight: 400 kg (882 lb)
- Gross weight: 630 kg (1,389 lb)
- Fuel capacity: 80 L (18 imp gal; 21 US gal)
- Powerplant: 1 × Anzani 6 6-cylinder radial engine, 45–50 kW (60–67 hp)
- Propellers: 2-bladed

Performance

- Maximum speed: 150 km/h (93 mph, 81 kn)
- Cruise speed: 130 km/h (81 mph, 70 kn)
- Range: 600 km (370 mi, 320 nmi)
- Service ceiling: 4,000 m (13,000 ft) service
- Time to altitude: 23 min 15 s to 2,000 m (6,600 ft)
- Landing speed: 60 km/h (37 mph; 32 kn)
