= Guyard =

Guyard is a surname. Notable people with the surname include:

- Colette Guyard (born 1952), French footballer
- Hubert Guyard, French cyclist
- Marie Guyart (1599–1672), Ursuline nun of the French order
- Michel Guyard (1936–2021), French Catholic bishop
- Sarah Guyard-Guillot (1981–2013), French acrobat and aerialist

== See also ==
- Villeneuve-la-Guyard, commune in the Yonne department in Bourgogne-Franche-Comté in north-central France
- Guyart
