= Goupy Type B =

French biplane from the early 1910s

General information
- Type: Experimental aircraft
- National origin: France
- Designer: Ambroise Goupy
- Number built: at least 12

History
- First flight: 1913

The Goupy Type B was a staggered biplane designed by Ambroise Goupy in the early 1910s.

== Design ==
The Goupy Type B was a staggered biplane that could be fitted with main and tail floats, retaining the land uncarriage, to create a hydroplane. The Goupy Type B.1 was a similar 3-seat version, exhibited at the 1913 Paris Aero Salon, powered by a 75 kW (100 hp) Gnome 9 Delta 9-cylinder rotary engine.

== Specifications ==
Data from Jane's All the World's Aircraft 1913

General characteristics

- Crew: 1
- Length: 8 m (26 ft 3 in)
- Wingspan: 13 m (42 ft 8 in)
- Wing area: 45 m^{2} (480 sq ft)
- Empty weight: 300 kg (661 lb)
- Gross weight: 450 kg (992 lb)
- Powerplant: 1 × Gnome 7 Lambda 7-cylinder air-cooled rotary piston engine, 60 kW (80 hp)

Alternate engine:- 75 kW (100 hp) Gnome 9 Delta 9-cylinder air-cooled rotary piston engine

Performance

- Maximum speed: 120 km/h (75 mph, 65 kn)
