= H-class blimp =

1921 blimp of the United States Navy

H class
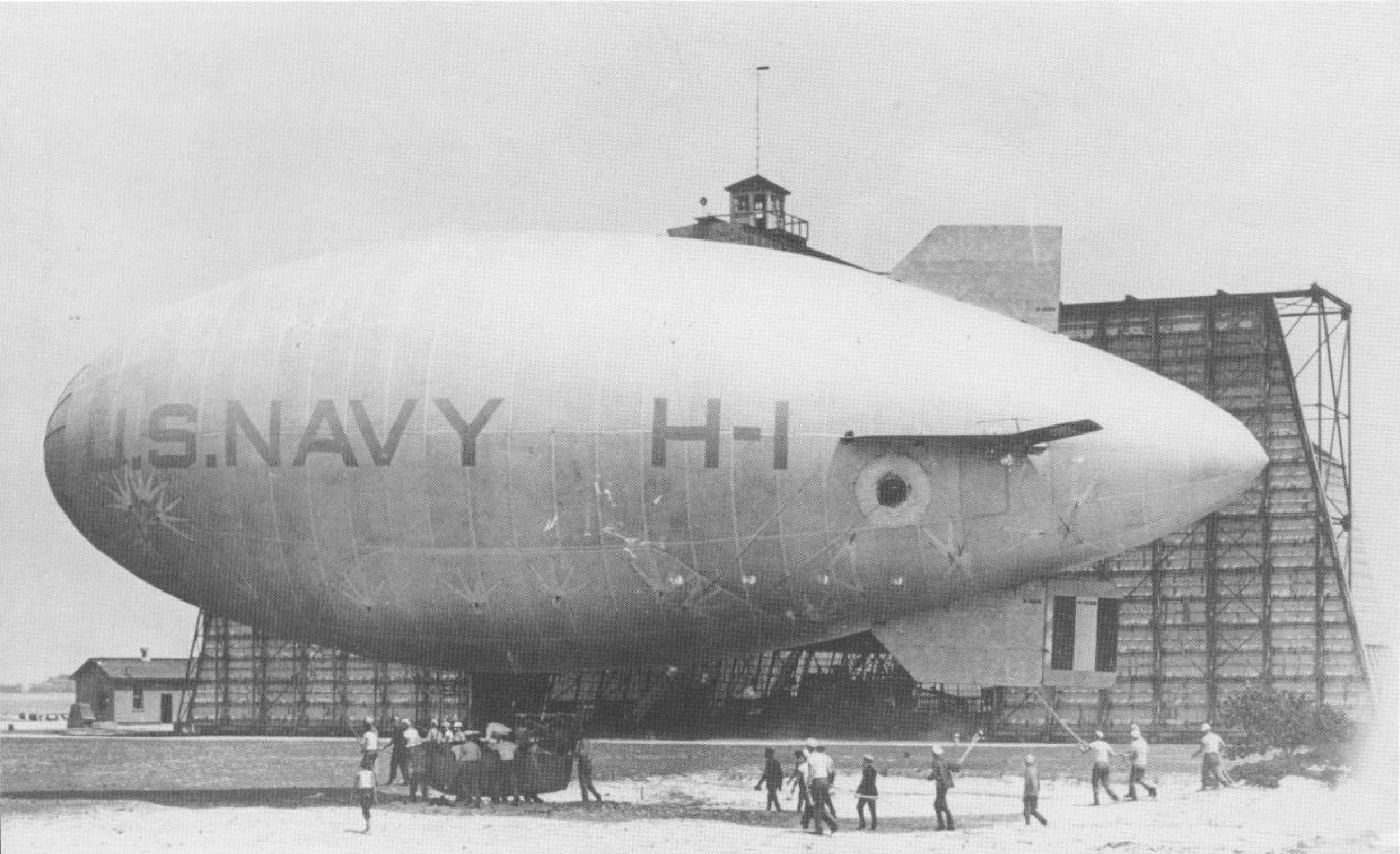
- NAVY H-1

General information
- Type: Observation airship
- Manufacturer: Goodyear-Zeppelin Corporation
- Primary users: United States Navy United States Army
- Number built: 2

History
- Introduction date: 1921
- Retired: 1923

The H class blimp was an observation airship built for the U.S. Navy in the early 1920s. The original "H" Class design of 1919 was for a twin engined airship of approximately 80,000 cubic feet volume. Commander Lewis Maxfield (who was to have commanded the ZR-2, better known as the R38, and died in its crash) suggested that a small airship which could be used either as a tethered kite balloon, or be towed by a ship until releasing its cable, would be able to scout on its own. The concept was an airship similar to the later Army Motorized Kite Balloons.

== Operational history ==
After test flights at the Wingfoot Lake Airship Hangar, H-1 was shipped to Rockaway in May 1921. During the summer of 1921, H-1 completed six flights and, on its seventh, a hard landing pitched the crew out of the control car. H-1 free ballooned as far as Scarsdale, New York where a farmer was able to grab the rip cord and tie the blimp down. During the night, hydrogen began leaking from the envelope and by morning it was completely deflated. The deflated H-1 was shipped back to Rockaway in time to be destroyed in the hangar fire of August 31, 1921.

A second H-type was acquired on a Navy contract but supplied directly to the U.S. Army which operated it as the OB-1. OB-1 varied in several ways from the H-1. The shift from hydrogen to helium lift gas in 1923 seriously degraded the OB-1's performance. The OB-1 was damaged on 6 October 1923 and never flew again as the forthcoming TA type airship would meet the training role. OB-1 was declared surplus at the end of 1923.

== Operators ==
=== United States ===
- United States Navy
- United States Army

== Specifications ==
General characteristics

- Crew: Two
- Length: 94 ft 10 in (28.91 m)
- Diameter: 32 ft 8 in (9.96 m)
- Height: 40 ft 10 in (12.45 m)
- Volume: 43,030 cu ft (1,218 m^{3})
- Useful lift: 1,146 lb (520 kg)
- Powerplant: 1 × Lawrence L-4 , 60 hp (45 kW)

Performance

- Maximum speed: 50 mph (80 km/h, 43 kn)
- Range: 400 mi (640 km, 350 nmi)
- Endurance: 7 hours
- Service ceiling: 6,000 ft (1,830 m)

== See also ==
Related lists

- List of airships of the United States Navy
