= Goupy Hydroaeroplane =

General information
- Type: Experimental aircraft
- National origin: France
- Designer: Ambroise Goupy
- Number built: at least 1

History
- Introduction date: 1912

The Goupy Hydroaeroplane was a floatplane developed by Ambroise Goupy in 1912, which was displayed at the 1912 Paris Aero Salon. It was described in Flight as being generally comparable to a Goupy biplane designed by Alphonse Tellier displayed the year before, except for the change from wheels to a pair of pontoon-style floats. Janes 1913 stated that at least one had been built in 1912, and that the company was producing around 30 a year, but actual production numbers are not known beyond the 1912 demonstrator. An editorial review of the 1913 Paris Aero Salon bemoaned the lack of advancement in Goupy designs, with no display of a seaplane.

== Specifications (Hydroaeroplane) ==
Data from Jane's All the World's Aircraft 1913

General characteristics

- Crew: 1
- Capacity: 2 passengers
- Length: 10 m (32 ft 10 in)
- Wingspan: 12.7 m (41 ft 8 in)
- Wing area: 45 m^{2} (480 sq ft)
- Empty weight: 450 kg (992 lb)
- Gross weight: 750 kg (1,653 lb)
- Powerplant: 1 × Gnome Lambda 7-cylinder air-cooled rotary piston engine, 60 kW (80 hp)
- Propellers: 2-bladed fixed-pitch propeller

Performance

- Maximum speed: 120 km/h (75 mph, 65 kn)
