= Gotha WD.2 =

WD.2, WD.5, WD.9, WD.12, WD.13, and WD.15
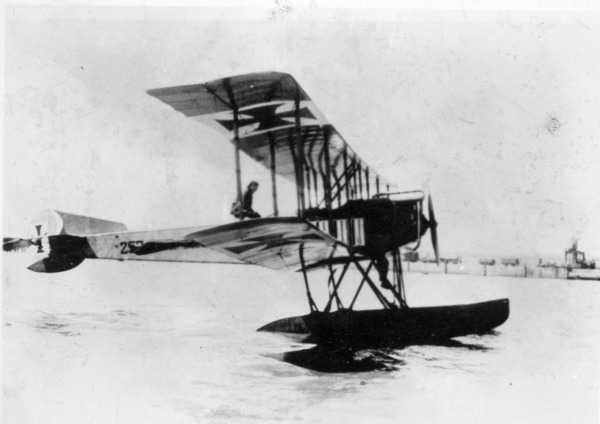

General information
- Type: Reconnaissance seaplane
- National origin: Germany
- Manufacturer: Gotha
- Designer: Oskar Ursinus
- Primary users: Imperial German Navy Ottoman aviation squadrons

History
- First flight: April 1914

The Gotha WD.2 (for Wasser Doppeldecker - "Water Biplane") and its derivatives were a family of military reconnaissance aircraft produced in Germany just before and during the early part of World War I.

== Design and development ==
The WD.2 was a development of the Avro 503 that had been built under licence by Gotha as the WD.1, and like it, was a conventional three-bay biplane with tandem, open cockpits. The landing gear comprised twin pontoons and dispensed with the small pontoon carried under the tail of the WD.1. Machines built for the Imperial German Navy were unarmed, but those supplied to the Ottoman aviation squadrons carried a 7.92 mm (.312 in) machine gun in a ring mount on the upper wing, accessible to the observer, whose seat was located directly below it.

In an attempt to increase performance, one WD.2 was built with a reduced wingspan and its Benz Bz.III engine replaced with the more powerful Mercedes D.III. Designated the WD.5, no further examples were built in this configuration, but it served as the pattern for the WD.9, built in a small series. This differed from the WD.5 prototype in having a trainable 7.92 mm (.312 in) machine gun located in the rear cockpit, to which the observer had been relocated. One such aircraft was supplied to the Navy, with the rest of the batch going to Turkey, albeit with the less powerful engine of the WD.2.

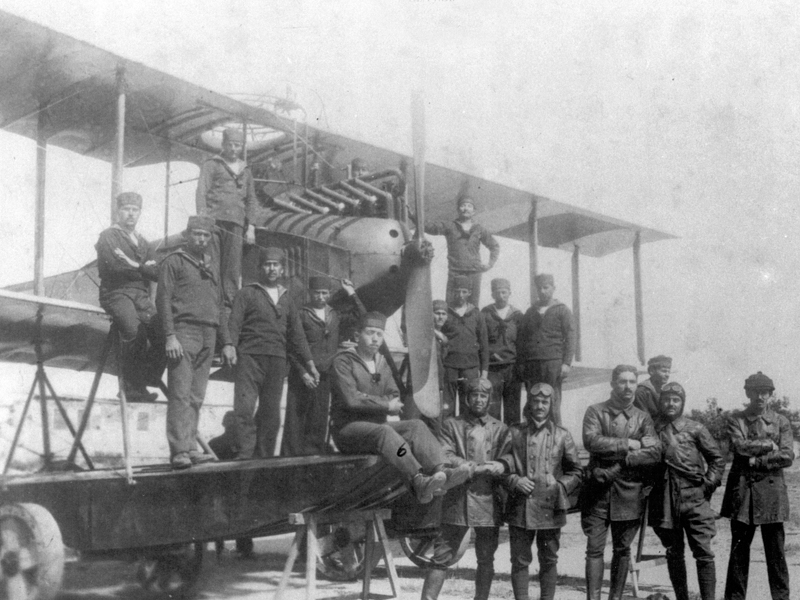

The last member of the family to be built in any quantity was the D.III-powered WD.12, an unarmed version which featured greater attention to streamlining the aircraft, most especially around the engine area, which was now provided with a close-fitting cowl and a spinner for the propeller. Again, this type was supplied to both Germany and the Ottoman Empire. It was followed in production by a small number of WD.13s, essentially similar but for the use again of the less powerful Bz.III.

Finally, two WD.15s were built after a considerable redesign of the aircraft. These had plywood-covered fuselages, as opposed to the fabric covering used on all earlier members of the family, and were fitted with Mercedes D.IVa engines.

== Variants ==
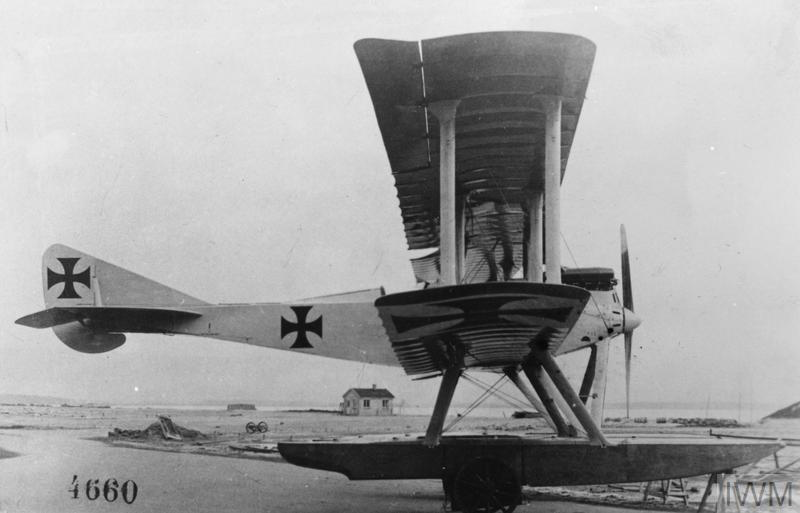
A Gotha WD.12

WD.2
Unarmed version with Benz Bz.III engine, 16.43 m (53.9 ft) span wings.
WD.2a
A short span version of the WD.2 with 15.6 m (51 ft) span wings.
WD.5
Unarmed version with Mercedes D.III engine (1 built)
WD.9
Armed version with Mercedes D.III engine (Germany) or Benz Bz.III engine (Ottoman Empire)
WD.12
Unarmed version with Mercedes D.III engine
WD.13
Unarmed version with Benz Bz.III engine
WD.15
Version with plywood-skinned fuselage and Mercedes D.IVa engine

== Operators ==
Germany

- Kaiserliche Marine

Turkey

- Ottoman Air Force

== Specifications (WD.2) ==
Data from German Aircraft of the First World War

General characteristics

- Crew: 2
- Length: 10.5 m (34 ft 5 in)
- Wingspan: 15.6 m (51 ft 2 in)
- Wing area: 56 m^{2} (600 sq ft)
- Empty weight: 1,065 kg (2,348 lb)
- Gross weight: 1,630 kg (3,594 lb)
- Powerplant: 1 × Benz Bz.III 6-cylinder water-cooled in-line piston engine, 110 kW (150 hp)

Performance

- Maximum speed: 112 km/h (70 mph, 60 kn)
- Range: 670 km (420 mi, 360 nmi)
- Service ceiling: 3,000 m (9,800 ft)
