= Graham-Perren Racer =

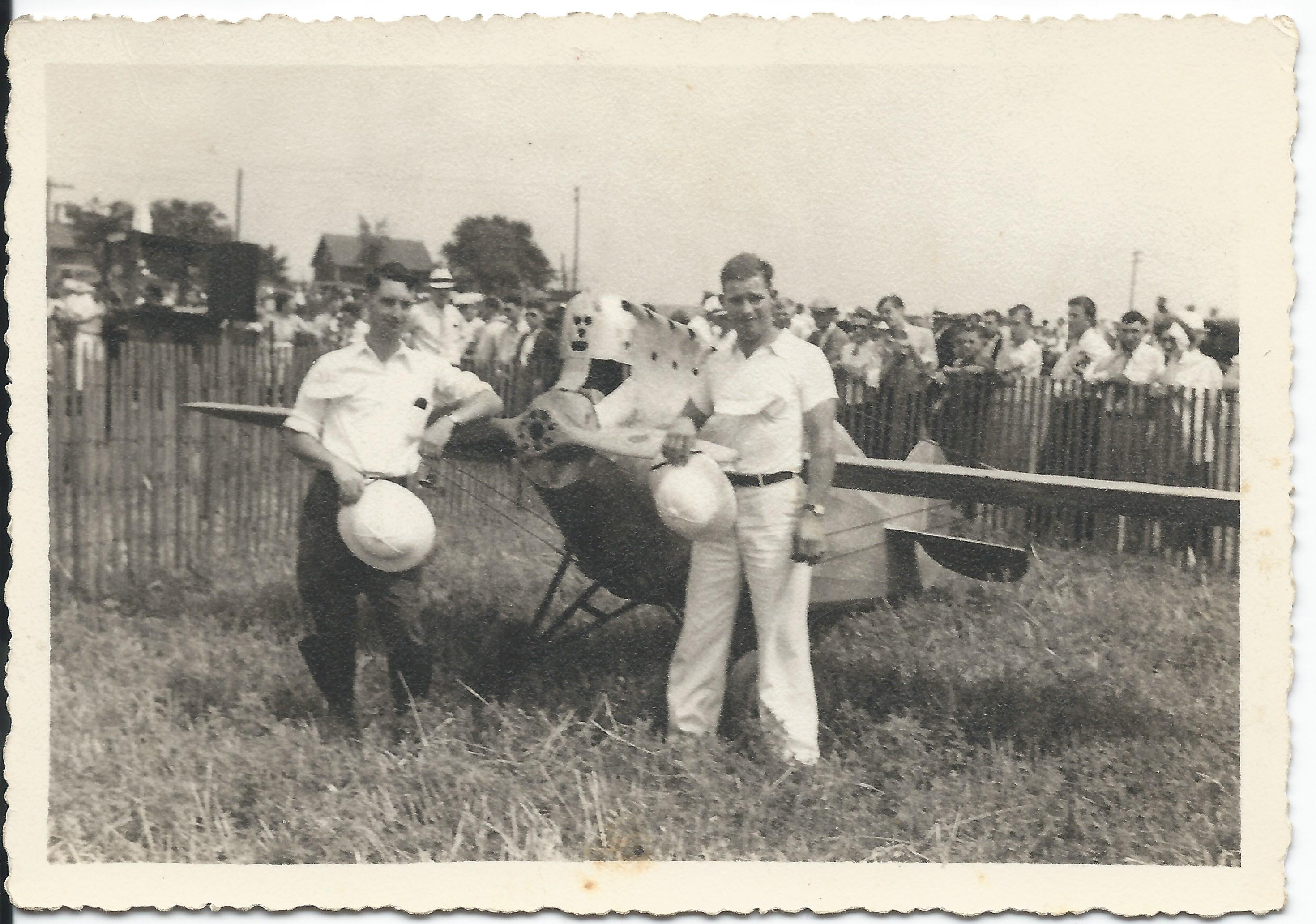

General information
- Type: Racing aircraft
- Designer: George Graham & Charles Perren Jr, Waukesha WI.
- Number built: 1

History
- Introduction date: 1933

The Graham-Perren Racer, or Graham-Perren Monoplane, was a racing aircraft built to compete in the 1934 National Air Races, including the Greve Trophy.

== Design and development ==
The racer was a short-coupled, wire braced, mid-winged aircraft with fixed conventional landing gear and an open cockpit. The Wright Gipsy engine protruded upward through the cowl leaving little forward visibility.

== Specifications (Graham-Perren Racer) ==
Data from Skyways

General characteristics

- Crew: 1
- Powerplant: 1 × Wright Gipsy Inline Piston, 100 hp (75 kW)

== See also ==
Aircraft of comparable role, configuration, and era

- Howard DGA-3
