= GT-Gyroplanes Kruza =

Australian autogyro

Kruza
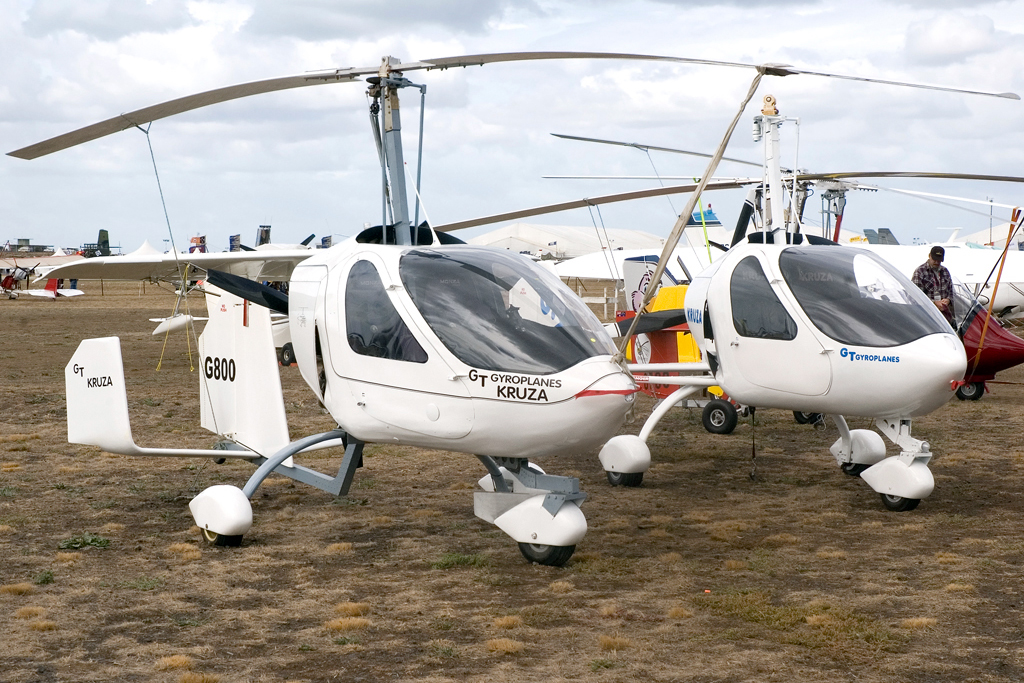

General information
- Type: Autogyro
- National origin: Australia
- Manufacturer: GT-Gyroplanes
- Designer: Geoff and Alistair Morrison
- Status: In production (2013)

The GT-Gyroplanes Kruza (Cruiser) is an Australian autogyro, designed by brothers Geoff and Alistair Morrison and produced by GT-Gyroplanes of Moama, New South Wales. The aircraft is supplied as a kit for amateur construction or as a complete ready-to-fly-aircraft.

== Design and development ==
The Kruza features a single main rotor, a two-seats-in side-by-side configuration enclosed cockpit, tricycle landing gear with wheel pants and a four-cylinder, air-cooled, four-stroke, 165 hp (123 kW) Subaru EJ25 automotive conversion engine in pusher configuration. The 165 hp (123 kW) Suzuki G16B turbocharged four cylinder automotive engine, with an Autoflight 2.47:1 ratio reduction drive is also offered.

The aircraft fuselage is made with an aluminum box-section main frame and 4130 steel tubing for the twin tail booms and mounts an 8.84 m (29.0 ft) diameter rotor. The 1.21 m (48 in) wide cabin is made from composites and can be flown doors-on or with the doors removed. The main landing gear legs are made from composites and the nose wheel is of the free-castering type, with steering accomplished by main wheel differential braking using the fitted hydraulic toe brakes. Because the aircraft is designed for the harsh operating conditions of the Australian outback the radiator is mounted above the engine, to preclude damage and a 130 litres (29 imp gal; 34 US gal) fuel tank gives extra range. The Kruza has an empty weight of 360 kg (794 lb) and a gross weight of 600 kg (1,323 lb), giving a useful load of 240 kg (529 lb).

== Specifications (Kruza) ==
Data from Bayerl

General characteristics

- Crew: one
- Capacity: one passenger
- Length: 4.450 m (14 ft 7 in)
- Width: 2.050 m (6 ft 9 in)
- Height: 2.800 m (9 ft 2 in)
- Empty weight: 360 kg (794 lb)
- Gross weight: 600 kg (1,323 lb)
- Fuel capacity: 130 litres (29 imp gal; 34 US gal)
- Powerplant: 1 × Subaru EJ25 four cylinder, air-cooled, four stroke automotive engine, 123 kW (165 hp)
- Propellers: 3-bladed composite, 1.83 m (6 ft 0 in) diameter

Performance

- Maximum speed: 148 km/h (92 mph, 80 kn)
- Cruise speed: 139 km/h (86 mph, 75 kn)
- Never exceed speed: 170 km/h (100 mph, 90 kn)
- Rate of climb: 3.81 m/s (750 ft/min)
