= Drachenbau Josef Guggenmos =

German hang glider manufacturer

- Company type: Private company
- Industry: Aerospace
- Fate: Owner died on 25 December 2010
- Key people: Founder and CEO: Josef Guggenmos
- Products: Hang gliders

Drachenbau Josef Guggenmos (English: Josef Guggenmos Kites) was a German aircraft manufacturer, specializing in designing and building competition flex-wing and rigid wing hang gliders. The company was based in Kaufbeuren.

The company founder, Josef Guggenmos, was a World Champion hang glider pilot. Guggenmos died on 25 December 2010 and, as a result, the company was wound-up.

== Aircraft ==
Summary of aircraft built by
Model name	First flight	Number built	Type
Guggenmos Bullet			hang glider
Guggenmos ESC			hang glider
Guggenmos Rebull			hang glider
