= Goupy Type A =

General information
- Type: Experimental aircraft
- National origin: France
- Designer: Ambroise Goupy
- Number built: Unknown

History
- Introduction date: 1912

The Goupy Type A was a staggered biplane designed by Ambroise Goupy in the early 1910s.

== Design ==
The Goupy Type A was a staggered biplane. The similar Goupy Type AA was powered by an Anzani engine.

== Specifications ==
Data from Jane's All the World's Aircraft 1913

General characteristics

- Crew: 1
- Length: 7.50 m (24 ft 7 in)
- Wingspan: 8 m (26 ft 3 in)
- Wing area: 45 m^{2} (480 sq ft)
- Empty weight: 300 kg (661 lb)
- Gross weight: 450 kg (992 lb)
- Powerplant: 1 × Gnome 7 Omega 7-cylinder air-cooled rotary piston engine, 37 kW (50 hp)

Performance

- Maximum speed: 100 km/h (62 mph, 54 kn)
