= Goodyear Inflatoplane =

Experimental aircraft of the 1950s

Inflatoplane
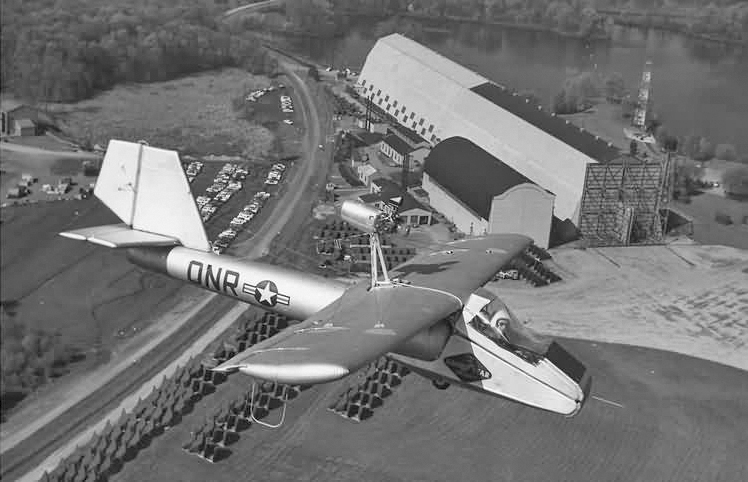
- Goodyear GA-447 Inflatoplane at the Akron, Ohio test area

General information
- Type: Experimental aircraft
- Manufacturer: Goodyear Aircraft Company
- Primary user: United States Army
- Number built: 12

History
- Manufactured: 1955–1962
- First flight: 13 February 1956

The Goodyear Inflatoplane is an inflatable experimental aircraft made by the Goodyear Aircraft Company, a subsidiary of Goodyear Tire and Rubber Company, well known for the Goodyear Blimp. Although it seemed an improbable project, the finished aircraft proved to be capable of meeting its design objectives, although orders were never forthcoming from the military. A total of 12 prototypes were built between 1956 and 1959, and testing continued until 1972, when the project was finally cancelled.

== Design and development ==
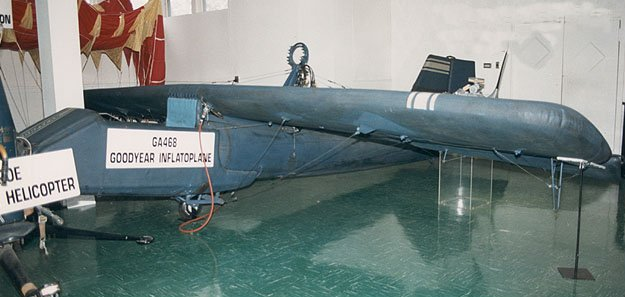
GA-468 on display at the Smithsonian Institution

The original concept of an all-fabric inflatable aircraft was based on Taylor McDaniel's inflatable rubber glider experiments in 1931. Designed and built in only 12 weeks, the Goodyear Inflatoplane was built in 1956, with the idea that it could be used by the military as a rescue plane to be dropped in a hardened container behind enemy lines. The 44 cubic ft (1.25 cubic meter) container could also be transported by truck, jeep trailer or aircraft. The inflatable surface of this aircraft was actually a sandwich of two rubber-type materials connected by a mesh of nylon threads, forming an I-beam. When the nylon was exposed to air, it absorbed and repelled water as it stiffened, giving the aircraft its shape and rigidity. Structural integrity was retained in flight with forced air being continually circulated by the aircraft's motor. This continuous pressure supply enabled the aircraft to have a degree of puncture resilience, the testing of airmat showing that it could be punctured by up to six .30 calibre bullets and retain pressure. There were at least two notable versions developed.

=== GA-468 ===
The GA-468 was a single-seater. It took about five minutes to inflate to about 25 psi (170 kPa); at full size, it was 19 ft 7 in (5.97 m) long, with a 22 ft (6.7 m) wingspan. A pilot would then hand-start the two-stroke cycle, 40 horsepower (30 kW) Nelson engine, and takeoff with a maximum load of 240 pounds (110 kg). On 20 US gallons (76 L) of fuel, the aircraft could fly 390 miles (630 km), with an endurance of 6.5 hours. Maximum speed was 72 miles per hour (116 km/h), with a cruise speed of 60 mph. Later, a 42 horsepower (31 kW) engine was used in the aircraft.

Takeoff from turf was in 250 feet with 575 feet needed to clear a 50-foot obstacle. It landed in 350 feet. Rate of climb was 550 feet per minute. Its service ceiling was estimated at 10,000 ft.

=== GA-466 ===
The GA-466 was the two-seater version, 2 in (51 mm) shorter, but with a 6 ft (1.8 m) longer wingspan than the GA-468. A more powerful 60 horsepower (45 kW) McCulloch 4318 engine could power the 740 pounds (340 kg) of plane and passenger to 70 miles per hour (110 km/h), although the range of the plane was limited to 275 miles (443 km).

== Operational history ==
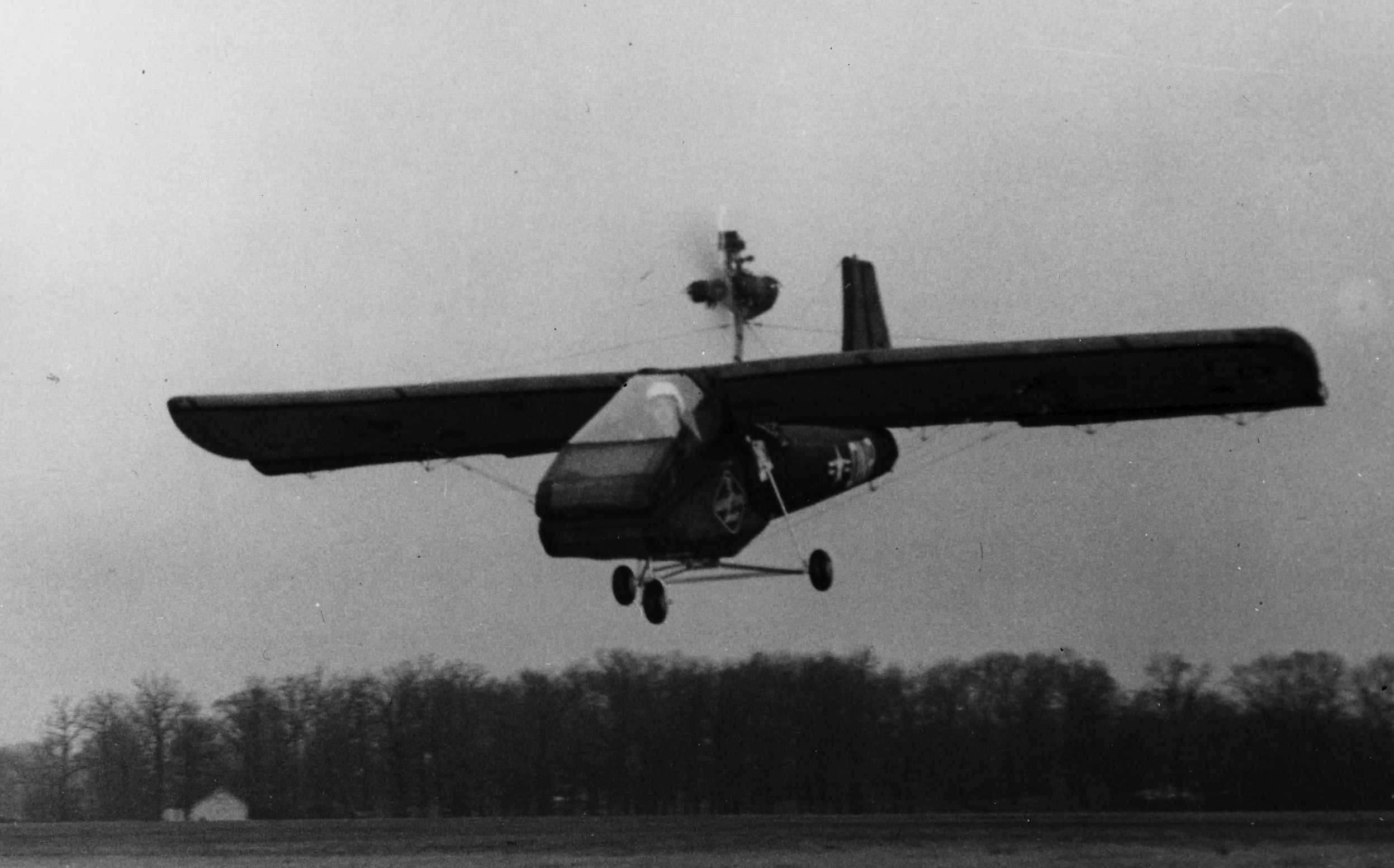
Goodyear GA-447 Inflatoplane coming in to land during ONR flight testing with tri-cycle landing gear

The test program at Goodyear's facilities near Wingfoot Lake, Akron, Ohio showed that the inflation could be accomplished with as little as 8 psi (544 mbar), less than a car tire. The flight test program had a fatal crash when Army aviator Lt. Malcolm "Pug" Wallace was killed. The aircraft was in a descending turn when one of the control cables under the wing came off the pulley and was wedged in the pulley bracket, locking the stick. The turn tightened until one of the wings folded up over the propeller and was chopped up. With the wings flapping because of loss of air, one of the aluminum wing tip skids hit the pilot in the head, as was clear from marks on his helmet. Wallace was pitched out, over the nose of the aircraft and fell into the shallow lake. His parachute never opened. Only 12 Goodyear Inflatoplanes were built, but development continued until the project was cancelled in 1973.

== Variants ==
GA-33 Inflatoplane
The initial single-seat version, with open cockpit, based on Taylor McDaniel's inflatable rubber glider experiments from the early 1930s. One built.
GA-447 Inflatoplane
An enclosed cockpit and new wing, used for undercarriage experiments (tricycle, uniwheel, and hydroskid). One built.
GA-466 Inflatoplane
Company designation for the AO-2 Inflatoplane
GA-468 Inflatoplane
Company designation for the AO-3 Inflatoplane
XAO-2-GI Inflatoplane
Military designation for the GA-466. One built.
XAO-3-GI Inflatoplane
Military designation for the GA-468. Five built.

== Surviving aircraft ==
Goodyear donated two Inflatoplanes for museum display at the end of the project, one to the Franklin Institute in Philadelphia and one to the Smithsonian Institution in Washington, D.C. Another is on display at the Stonehenge Air Museum in Fortine, Montana. A fourth is in storage at the National Naval Aviation Museum in Pensacola, Florida. A fifth is in storage with the Ohio Historical Society in Columbus, Ohio. A sixth is on display in the US Army Aviation Museum's Training Support Facility in Fort Novosel, Alabama.

== Specifications (Goodyear GA-468 Inflatoplane (XAO-3-GI)) ==
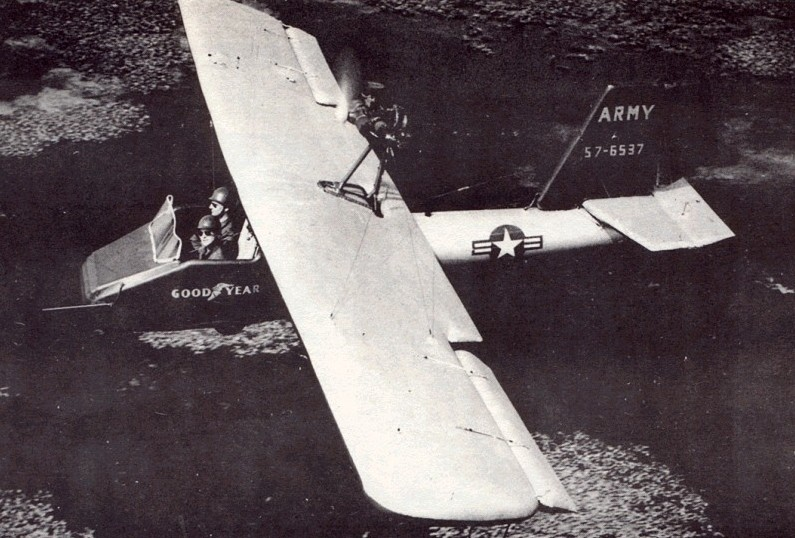
Model 466/XAO-2 Inflatoplane

Data from Inflatoplanes, The Inflatoplane

General characteristics

- Crew: 1
- Length: 19 ft 8.4 in (6.005 m)
- Wingspan: 22 ft (6.7 m)
- Wing area: 110 sq ft (10 m^{2})
- Airfoil: NACA 0015
- Empty weight: 225 lb (102 kg)
- Gross weight: 550 lb (249 kg)
- Max takeoff weight: 590 lb (268 kg) maximum crew weight with maximum fuel
- Fuel capacity: 20 US gal (17 imp gal; 76 L) / 125 lb (57 kg)
- Compressor: Pesco engine driven compressor
- Compressor capacity: 27 cu ft/min (765 L/min)
- Inflation pressure: 7 psi (48.26 kPa)
- Inflation time: 5 minutes
- Powerplant: 1 × Nelson H-63A (YO-65) 2-cylinder air-cooled 2-stroke horizontally-opposed piston engine, 42 hp (31 kW) at 4000 rpm
- Propellers: 2-bladed fixed-pitch propeller

Performance

- Maximum speed: 72 mph (116 km/h, 63 kn)
- Cruise speed: 60 mph (97 km/h, 52 kn)
- Stall speed: 37 mph (60 km/h, 32 kn)
- Range: 390 mi (630 km, 340 nmi)
- Endurance: 6 hours 30 minutes
- Service ceiling: 10,000 ft (3,000 m)
- Rate of climb: 550 ft/min (2.8 m/s)
- Take-off run: 250 ft (76 m) on sod
- Take-off distance to 50 ft (15 m): 575 ft (175 m) on sod
- Landing run: 350 ft (107 m) on sod
