= Goodyear Type AD =

Airship

Type AD

General information
- Type: Sporting airship
- National origin: United States of America
- Manufacturer: Goodyear-Zeppelin Corporation

History
- First flight: 3 June 1925
- Retired: 30 December 1931

The Goodyear Type AD was a small airship built in the United States in the mid-1920s. The first example, christened Pilgrim, was Goodyear's first civil airship, and their first airship to use helium as its lift gas. Originally intended for pleasure cruising, it soon found its true calling as a promotional vehicle as the first "Goodyear Blimp" in a line that has continued for one hundred years. The Type AD was a conventional blimp design with a gondola that could carry two passengers in addition to the flight crew. While usually described as a non-rigid type, the design in fact incorporated a triangular-section magnesium girder as a keel, fastened inside the envelope. The craft carried its own collapsible mooring mast which allowed it to "land" anywhere that 250 ft × 250 ft (76 m × 76 m) of clear ground was available.

A contemporary article in Flight describes the original intentions behind the design as:

It is claimed that there is a great future for this type of airship, and its mooring masts should be found at country clubs, private estates, etc., while the holding of airship regattas—in the same way that motor boat and yachting clubs now have similar events—can also be held with success. Personally, we think this small "blimp" type of airship possesses great possibilities from the sporting point of view, as is the case with ballooning, although, of course, "blimping" comes out a trifle more expensive.

Pilgrim was retired on 30 December 1931, having completed 4,765 flights and having carried 5,355 passengers. In that time, she remained aloft for 2,880 hours and covered 95,000 miles (15,300 km). Her gondola is preserved in the National Air and Space Museum.

== Specifications ==
Data from

General characteristics

- Crew: Two - pilot and engineer
- Capacity: 2 passengers
- Length: 105 ft 6 in (32.15 m)
- Diameter: 31 ft 6 in (9.60 m)
- Width: 40 ft 9 in (12.42 m)
- Height: 44 ft 0 in (13.41 m)
- Volume: 50,068 cu ft (1,417 m^{3})
- Empty weight: 2,023 lb (917 kg)
- Useful lift: 921 lb (418 kg)
- Powerplant: 1 × Lawrance L-4 (a.k.a. Wright Gale) 3-cyl. air-cooled radial piston engine , 60 hp (45 kW)

Performance

- Maximum speed: 51 mph (82 km/h, 44 kn)
- Range: 525 mi (844 km, 456 nmi)
