= Grigorovich MR-3 =

General information
- Type: Maritime patrol aircraft
- National origin: Soviet Union
- Manufacturer: Grigorovich
- Status: Cancelled
- Number built: 1

History
- First flight: 1929

The Grigorovich MR-3 (Morskoi Razviedchik - 3) was a prototype maritime patrol flying boat built in the Soviet Union during the late 1920s that was not accepted for production.

== Specifications MR-3 ==
Data from The Osprey Encyclopedia of Russian Aircraft, 1875–1995

General characteristics

- Crew: 3
- Length: 11.4 m (37 ft 5 in)
- Wingspan: 15.6 m (51 ft 2 in)
- Wing area: 52 m^{2} (560 sq ft)
- Empty weight: 2,027 kg (4,469 lb)
- Gross weight: 3,082 kg (6,795 lb)
- Fuel capacity: 440 kg (970 lb)
- Powerplant: 1 × BMW VI water-cooled V-12, 510 kW (680 hp)

Performance

- Maximum speed: 194 km/h (121 mph, 105 kn)
- Range: 750 km (470 mi, 400 nmi)
- Service ceiling: 4,000 m (13,000 ft)
- Time to altitude: 7 minutes to 1,000 m (3,300 ft)

Armament

- Guns: 1 × 7.62 mm (0.3 in) PV-1 machine gun

== Bibliography ==
- Gunston, Bill (1995a). The Osprey Encyclopedia of Russian Aircraft 1875–1995. London: Osprey. ISBN 1-85532-405-9.
- Kotelnikov, V.; Kulikov, V. & Cony, C. (December 2001). "Les avions français en URSS, 1921–1941" [French Aircraft in the USSR, 1921–1941]. Avions: Toute l'Aéronautique et son histoire (in French) (105): 50–56. ISSN 1243-8650.
