= Gregor GR-1 =

GR-1

General information
- Type: Biplane trainer
- National origin: United States
- Manufacturer: Gregor Aircraft
- Designer: Michael Gregor
- Number built: 1

History
- Introduction date: 1930

The Gregor GR-1, also called the GR-1 Continental and the GR-1 Sportplane was a biplane with a tail-wheel undercarriage developed by Michael Gregor

== Development ==
The Gregor GR-1 was intended to be a light, low cost, training aircraft for depression-era customers. Gregor was based at Hangar B at Roosevelt Field in New York. The aircraft was a conventional geared biplane with two open cockpits in tandem with oversize interplane struts.

== Variants ==
Gregor GR-2

== Specifications (GR-1) ==
Data from Skyways

General characteristics

- Crew: 1
- Capacity: 1
- Length: 19 ft 3 in (5.87 m)
- Upper wingspan: 28 ft (8.5 m)
- Lower wingspan: 21 ft (6.4 m)
- Height: 7 ft 7 in (2.31 m)
- Empty weight: 900 lb (408 kg)
- Gross weight: 1,530 lb (694 kg)
- Powerplant: 1 × Wright-Gypsy L-320 4-cyl air-cooled in-line piston engine, 90 hp (67 kW)

Performance

- Maximum speed: 87 kn (100 mph, 160 km/h)
- Rate of climb: 1,000 ft/min (5.1 m/s)
