= Gribovsky G-8 =

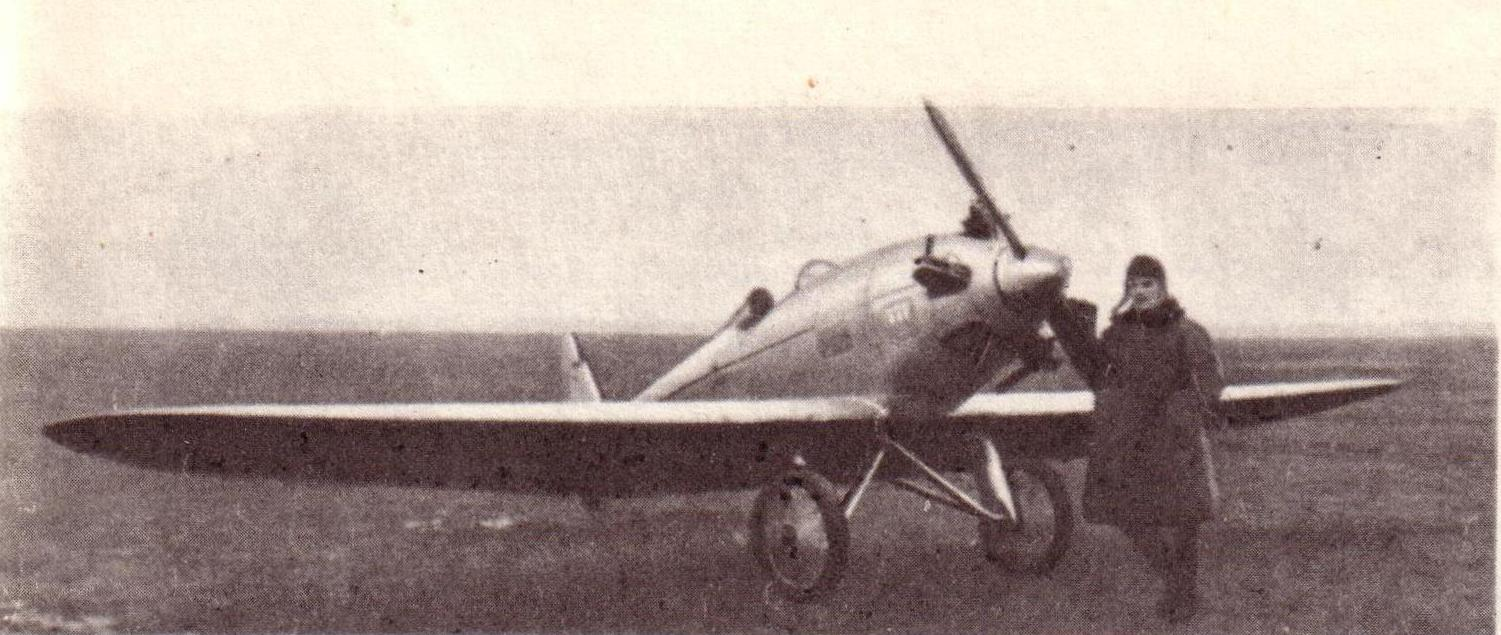

General information
- Type: Single seat sports aircraft
- National origin: USSR
- Designer: Vladislav Gribovsky
- Number built: 1

History
- First flight: 1932

The Gribovsky G-8 (Russian: ГРИБОВСКИЙ Г-8) was a single seat sports and training aircraft designed and built in the USSR in the early 1930s.

== Design and development ==
The G-8 was Gribovsky's third small powered design and the second to be flown. Like the G-5 and the unflown G-4, it was a single seat monoplane, though its 60 hp (45 kW), five cylinder Walter NZ-60 radial engine gave it considerably more power. Its structural design was repeated in several of Gribovsky's later aircraft.

The plywood covered centre section of the low wing was part of the monocoque fuselage and the two spar outer panels were ply covered back to the rear spar. The fuselage was a rounded monocoque with the engine in a streamlined nose, its cylinders exposed for cooling. Its single seat cockpit was set back towards the wing trailing edge. The G-8 had a fixed tail wheel undercarriage with its main wheels on cranked V-strut axles hinged to the centre of the fuselage underside. Each wheel had a faired vertical shock absorber leg to the outer part of the centre section.

Like other Gribovsky aircraft, the G-8 was built at the Moscow Aviation School. It was first flown in 1932. In October 1932 it flew a circular, 4,500 km (2,796 mi) from Moscow via Ryazan, Kazan, Samara. Saratov, Stalingrad, Rostov, Zaporozhye, Feodosiya, Poltava, Kharkiv and back to Moscow, piloted by D. A. Koshnits.

== Specifications ==
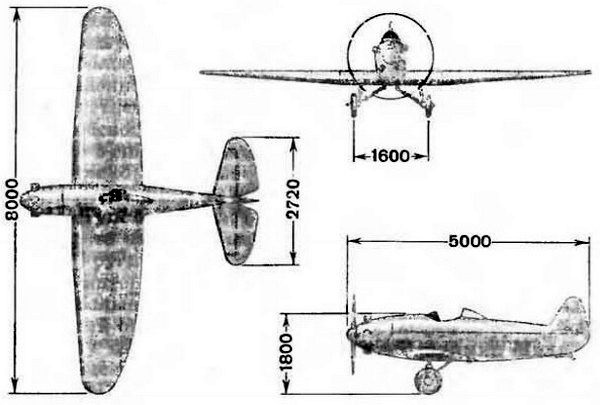
Gribovsky G-8

Data from Gunston (1995)

General characteristics

- Crew: One
- Length: 5.0 m (16 ft 5 in)
- Wingspan: 8.0 m (26 ft 3 in)
- Wing area: 9.0 m^{2} (97 sq ft)
- Empty weight: 320 kg (705 lb)
- Gross weight: 483 kg (1,065 lb)
- Fuel capacity: 70 kg (154 lb)
- Powerplant: 1 × Walter NZ-60 5-cylinder radial engine, 45 kW (60 hp)
- Propellers: 2-bladed

Performance

- Maximum speed: 150 km/h (93 mph, 81 kn)
- Service ceiling: 3,000 m (9,800 ft)
- Time to altitude: 18 min to 2,000 m (6,562 ft)
- Take-off distance: 85 m (279 ft)
- Landing distance: 100 m (328 ft)
