= Guerchais-Roche T.35 =

Guerchais-Roche T.35 and T.39
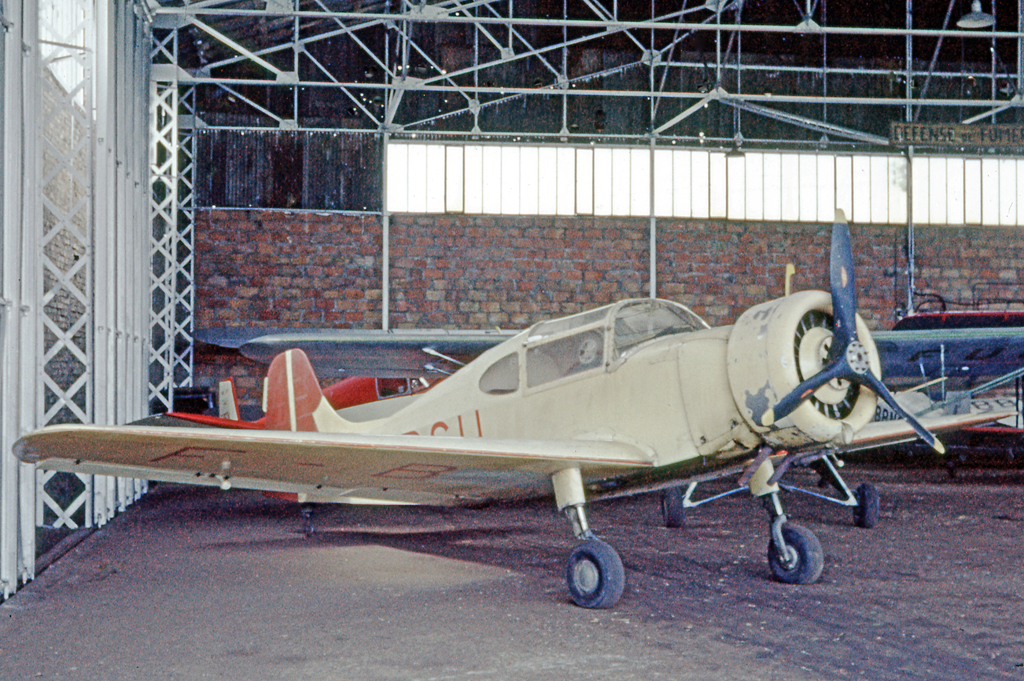
- Guerchais-Roche T.39/II four seat aircraft at St Cyr l'Ecole airfield near Paris in 1963

General information
- Type: touring monoplane
- National origin: France
- Manufacturer: Roche Aviation
- Status: no longer operational
- Primary user: private pilot owners
- Number built: 15

History
- Introduction date: 1946
- First flight: September 1944

The Guerchais-Roche T.35 and T.39 was a small family of two, three and four seat French-built touring monoplanes of the 1940s.

== Development ==
Roche Aviation designed the T.35 during the latter part of World War II as a low-wing touring monoplane with fixed undercarriage. The first example made its maiden flight in September 1944. After the war's end, Roche built a series of basically similar sub-models with varying powerplants and seating arrangements. The T.35 models were two-seat aircraft and the T.39 models accommodated three or four persons. Production was terminated after 15 examples of the series had been completed.

== Operational history ==
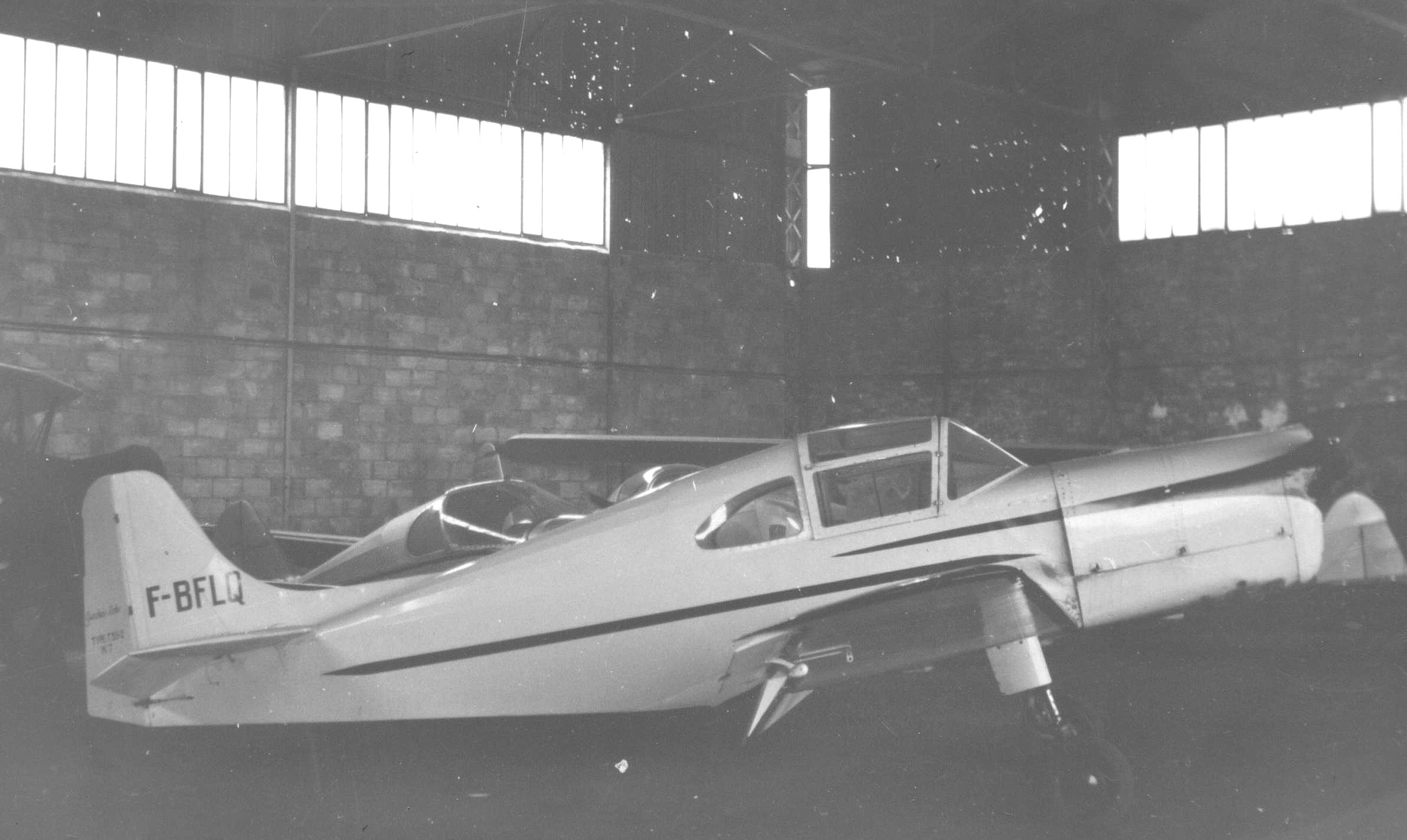
Guerchais-Roche T.35/II two seat aircraft at St Cyr airfield near Paris in 1957

The T.35 and T.39 series was flown by private pilot owners and by members of French light aero clubs until at least the mid-1960s. Three examples remained on the French civil aircraft register in January 1964. No examples are currently preserved in collections or museums.

== Variants ==
T.35
140 hp (100 kW) Renault 4Pei. One built.
T.35/I
100 hp (75 kW) Renault engine. One built.
T.35/II
140 hp (100 kW) Renault 4P-03. Seven built.
T.35/III
135 hp (101 kW) Regnier 4L-00. One built.
T.39
145 hp (108 kW) Mathis G7R radial. Two built. Three seats.
T.39/II
175 hp (130 kW) Salmson 9ND radial. Two built. Four seats.
T.55
Fitted with clear-view conopy and powered by 160 hp (120 kW) Walter Minor 6-III. One built.

== Specifications (T.35/II) ==
Data from Green

General characteristics

- Crew: 1
- Capacity: 1 passenger
- Length: 23 ft 9 in (7.24 m)
- Wingspan: 30 ft 6 in (9.30 m)
- Empty weight: 1,188 lb (539 kg)
- Gross weight: 1,867 lb (847 kg)
- Powerplant: 1 × Renault 4P-03 , 140 hp (104 kW)

Performance

- Maximum speed: 149 mph (240 km/h, 129 kn)
- Cruise speed: 134 mph (216 km/h, 116 kn)
- Range: 500 mi (805 km, 430 nmi)
