= Michael Gregor (aircraft engineer) =

Aircraft engineer of Georgian origin (1888–1953)

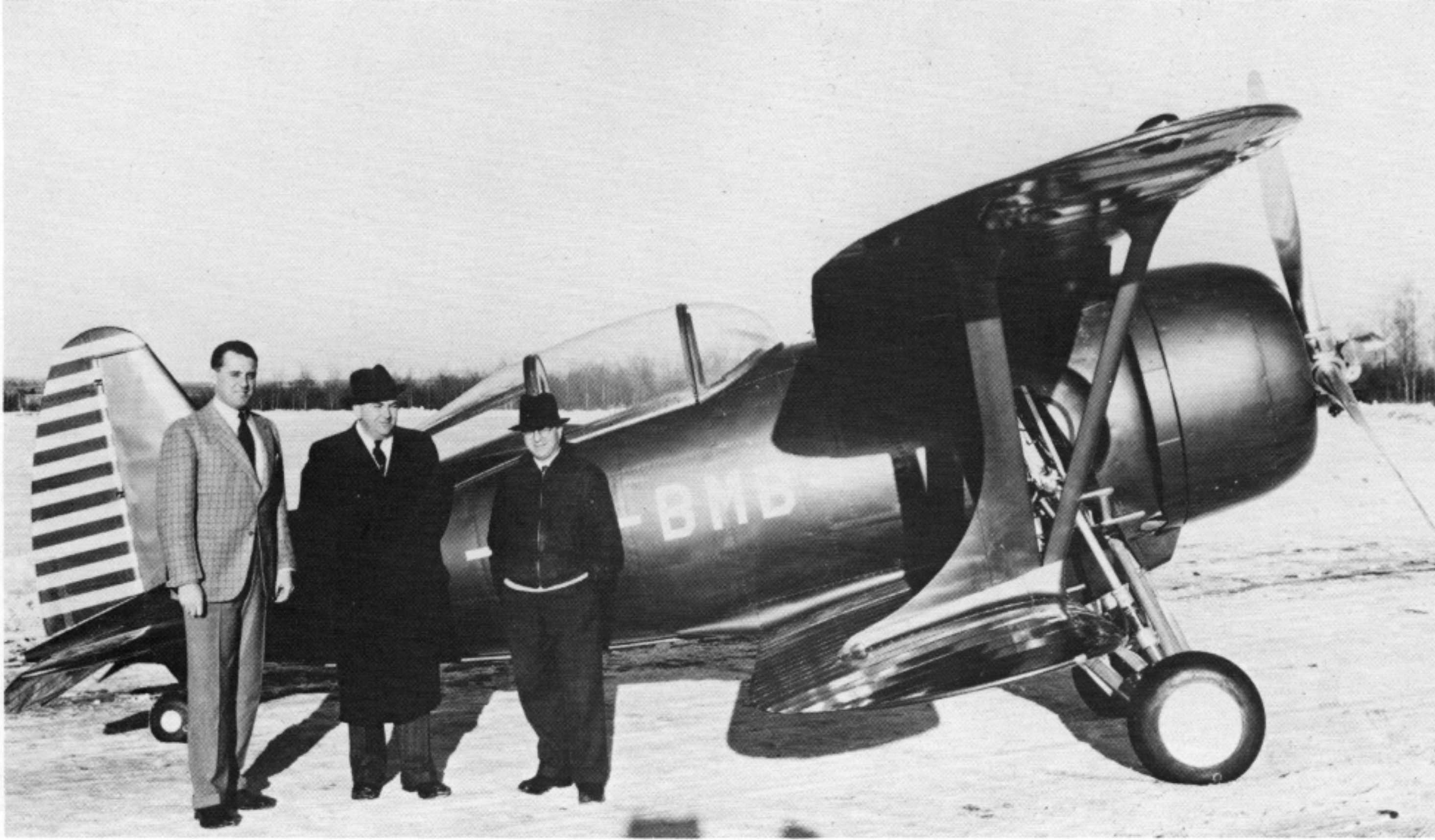
Left-to-right: George Ayde, Can-Car representative David Boyd and designer Michael Gregor standing at a FDB-1 fighter.

Michael Gregor, born Mikheil Grigorashvili (Georgian: მიხეილ გრიგორაშვილი) or Mikhail Leontyevich Grigorashvili (Russian: Михаил Леонтьевич Григорашвили) (1888–1953) was an aircraft engineer of Georgian origin, one of the pioneering aviators in the Russian Empire, the United States, and Canada.

== Early years ==
Born in Derbent, Russia, Grigorashvili graduated from the Imperial Institute of Communications in St. Petersburg and was trained as a pilot in France in 1911.

== Russia ==
Upon his return to Russia, Grigorashvili worked as an instructor for pilots and joined the army as an officer in World War I.

== Georgia ==
The Bolshevik coup in 1917 forced him to retire to a newly independent Georgia where he worked as a road engineer in the Georgian ministry for communications.

== United States ==
After the Soviet takeover of Georgia in 1921, he went in exile to the United States where he would naturalize in 1926. Having briefly worked for a minor aviation factory in Rhode Island, Grigorashvili, by then known as Gregor, was recruited as an aircraft designer by the Dayton-Wright Company in 1921, Curtiss-Wright in 1923, Seversky Aircraft Company in 1932 and Chase Aircraft in the 1940s where he worked until 1953. In 1934, Gregor founded his own firm Gregor Aircraft which constructed an original light plane GR-1.

== Canada ==
Two years later, Gregor was employed by the Canadian Car and Foundry and designed the FDB-1 biplane fighter. Despite being an advanced and innovative design, incorporating all-metal construction with flush riveting, retractable undercarriage and a sleek shape, the FDB-I was overtaken by events and, after being unable to find a buyer, was lost in a fire in 1945. Despite that, Gregor became one of the founders of the Canadian aviation industry.

== Final years ==
In the 1940s, Gregor worked as one of the leading designers for the Chase Aircraft company. He died in Trenton, New Jersey.
