= Moscow Aviation Institute Sh-Tandem =

1930s Soviet experimental ground attack aircraft

Sh-Tandem

General information
- Type: Attack aircraft
- National origin: Soviet Union
- Manufacturer: Moscow Aviation Institute
- Designer: Peter Grushin
- Number built: 3

The Moscow Aviation Institute Sh-Tandem (Russian: Ш-Тандем, other designations include Sh-MAI and MAI-Tandem) was a Soviet experimental ground attack aircraft of the 1930s. Designed by Peter Grushin at the Moscow Aviation Institute (hence the MAI designation), the aeroplane featured an unusual tandem wing, with the tail planes as large as 45% of the wing area. Elevators served as ailerons at the same time. While similar in layout to contemporary Soviet fighters (notably the Polikarpov I-16), the design also included a rear gunner's turret in the tail.

Three prototypes were built and flight-tested by Petr Mikhailovich Stefanovskiy between late 1937 and 1939, but no serial production followed.

== Design and development ==
In mid-1930s Soviet aviation circles were toying with the idea of a shturmovik – an attack aircraft capable both of strafing attacks, and limited fighter and bomber capabilities. There were two simultaneous directions for the engineers. One was focused on what would eventually become Ilyushin Il-2 and Sukhoi Su-6 – basically a heavily armoured heavy fighter airframe fitted with guns and racks for bombs and rockets. Entirely different direction was a much lighter airframe, based on single-seat fighter planes, adapted for ground attack duties, of which none were eventually accepted.

One of the latter was Sh-Tandem designed by Pyotr Dmitrievich Grushin at the Moscow Aviation Institute (MAI). The design was a non-conventional tandem wing aeroplane. Even distribution of weight between front and rear sections allowed for more ordnance to be installed in the airframe, including a rear gunner's turret. Additionally, lack of a vertical stabiliser allowed for wider field of fire. At the same time the tandem wing configuration allowed for the wings to be constructed of wood rather than metal and – at least in theory – was to give the new construction unprecedented manoeuvrability. Internally the fuselage was conventional for its times: a wooden monocoque, covered in plywood with some areas covered in bakelite.

Both front and rear wings were to be equipped with ailerons and elevators. Instead of a single vertical stabiliser, there were two mounted under the rear wing. There were five planned variants for the actual mounting of the stabilisers, mounted either at both ends of the wing, mid-way, underneath it or extending both above and below. Eventually the variant with vertical stabilizers both below and above the rear wing was adopted as the most suitable.

The landing gear included two front wheels retractable into bays in the front wings, and a non-retractable tail wheel.

Serial production Sh-Tandems were to be powered by the new Tumansky M-88 air-cooled radial engine. However, as they were not yet available, the prototypes used the earlier Tumansky M-87A instead.

== Specifications (Sh-Tandem) ==
Data from Alexandre Savine

General characteristics

- Crew: 2
- Length: 8.5 m (27 ft 11 in)
- Wingspan: 11 m (36 ft 1 in)
- Wing area: 30.4 m^{2} (327 sq ft)
- Gross weight: 2,560 kg (5,644 lb)
- Powerplant: 1 × Tumansky M-87 air-cooled radial engine, 690 kW (930 hp)
- Propellers: 3-bladed

Performance

- Cruise speed: 488 km/h (303 mph, 263 kn)
- Wing loading: 84 kg/m^{2} (17 lb/sq ft)

Armament

- 5 x ShKAS machine guns
- 200 kg bombs
