= Astir =

Astir may refer to:

- Bautek Astir, a German hang glider
- Grob G102 Astir, a German glider
- Grob G104 Speed Astir, a German glider
- Grob G103 Twin Astir, a German glider
- Grob Astir CS77, a German glider
- Grob G 118 Twin Astir II, a German glider
