= Grob Strato 2C =

German experimental high altitude research aircraft

Strato 2C
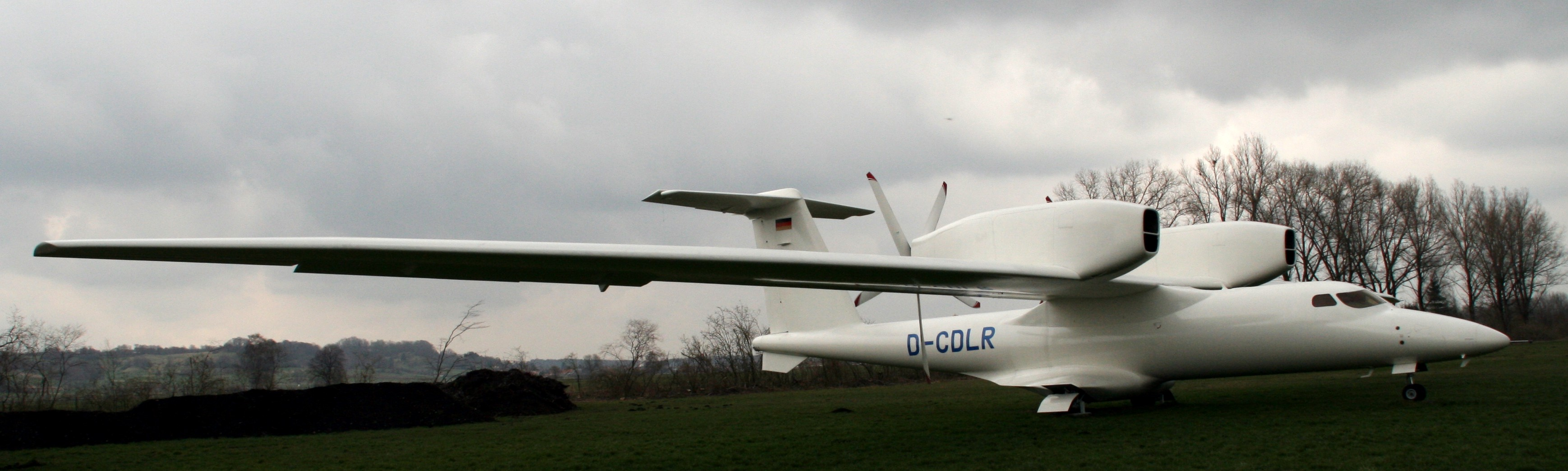
- Grob G 850 Strato 2C based in Mindelheim-Mattsies

General information
- Type: High Altitude Research Aircraft
- Manufacturer: Grob Aircraft
- Status: Prototype only
- Number built: 1

History
- First flight: 31 March 1995
- Last flight: 4 August 1995

The Grob Strato 2C is a German experimental high-altitude research aircraft. Powered by two turbocharged piston engines and featuring an extremely long-span wing of composite construction, the sole example was built in the 1990s. Although the development program was abandoned, the aircraft set a world altitude record for piston-engined aircraft on its final flight.

== Design and development ==
In April 1992, the German Aerospace Center (Deutsches Zentrum für Luft- und Raumfahrt e.V - DLR) commenced a programme to develop an aircraft to carry out atmospheric, stratospheric and climatic research. It chose Grob Aerospace to design and build an aircraft to meet these requirements, based both on its experience in use of composite material in aircraft structures together with its successful development of the Egrett surveillance aircraft, with the aircraft expected to be operational by 1996.

To meet the requirement to operate at an altitude of 24,000 m (78,700 ft) for 48 hours, Grob designed a twin-engined aircraft with a straight, very high aspect ratio wing of 56.5 m (185 ft 4½ in) span. The wings featured winglets, and were mounted across the top of the fuselage which terminated in a T-tail configuration. The aircraft was designed to be crewed by two pilots, and could accommodate two scientists and associated mission equipment in a pressurised cabin. A galley, rest facilities and a toilet were provided.

Unlike the Egrett, which was powered by a single turboprop engine, the Strato was powered by two wing-mounted pusher compound engines consisting of a turbocharged piston engine supplied by the low- and intermediate-pressure compressors and associated turbine machinery derived from a PW127 turboprop engine. Together with the piston engine's own turbocharger, this formed a three-stage turbocharging system that provided pressurised intake air at high altitude. This had the advantage of maintaining power at high altitudes. Each engine drove a 6 m (19 ft 8 in) diameter five-bladed propeller.

The propulsion system was developed under a programme of less than three years and a total development cost of less than DM30 million. To reduce cost and development risk, existing components were used wherever possible. The two-spool gas generator of the PW127 was selected for the low-pressure charger because it was a proven component incorporating advanced compressor and turbine technology, although its adaptation resulted in penalties in weight and efficiency and required a separate oil-supply and scavenge system.

The PW127-derived unit formed a two-spool low-pressure turbocharger incorporating low- and intermediate-pressure compressor stages and their associated turbine machinery. Exhaust leaving the piston engine's high-pressure turbocharger was supplied to the unit through a hot-gas distributor and twelve supply tubes. A new compressor-inlet case without the original accessory gearbox was fitted, while the low-pressure charger used its own lubrication and control systems. It could be disconnected at lower altitudes by an electrically operated hot-gas bypass valve, with intake air continuing to pass through the slowly windmilling compressors.

After each of the three compressor stages, the charge air was cooled to about 0 °C (32 °F) by air-to-air coolers. Cooling airflow was regulated by a movable inlet flap in the forward part of the nacelle according to altitude, ambient temperature and engine power. A digital control system matched the compressor stages during steady and transient operation, operated the low-pressure-charger bypass and bleed valves, regulated cooling airflow and limited rotor speed and manifold pressure.

Construction of the airframe moulds started mid-November 1992, with airframe construction beginning in April the following year, starting with the tailplane. The airframe was completed in 1994, and engine installation commenced.

== Operational history ==
The prototype first flew on 31 March 1995. Costs overran, however, and the prototype, which was intended as a proof-of-concept aircraft with off-the-shelf equipment and a heavier wing structure than planned for the production aircraft, was late and did not deliver the expected performance.

On 4 August 1995, during its 29th and ultimately final flight, the aircraft set a world altitude record for a crewed piston-engined aircraft of 18,552 m (60,867 ft). The DLR cancelled the programme in 1996.

The sole prototype is on static display outside Grob Aircraft's headquarters at Mindelheim-Mattsies Airport.

== Specifications (Strato 2C) ==
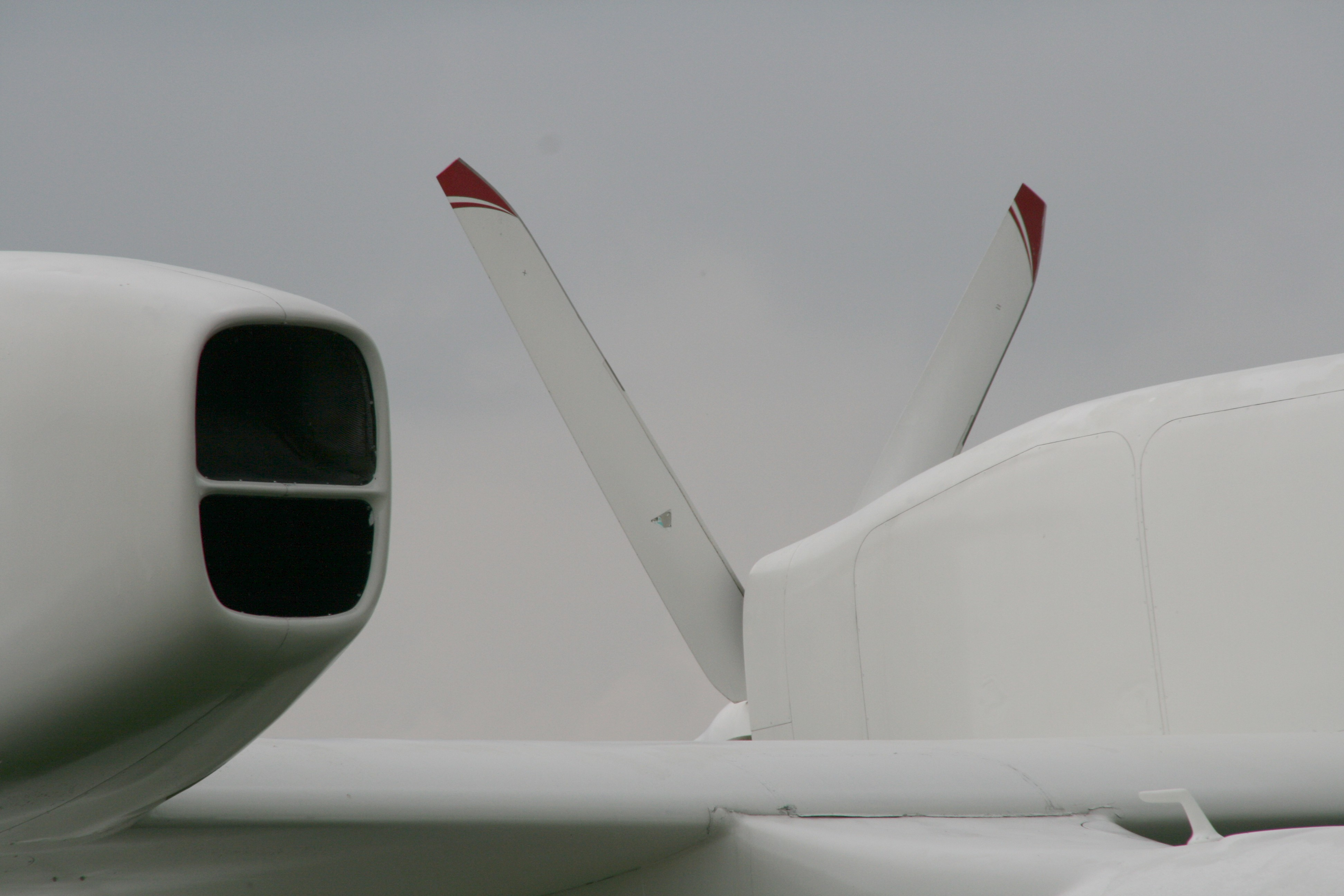

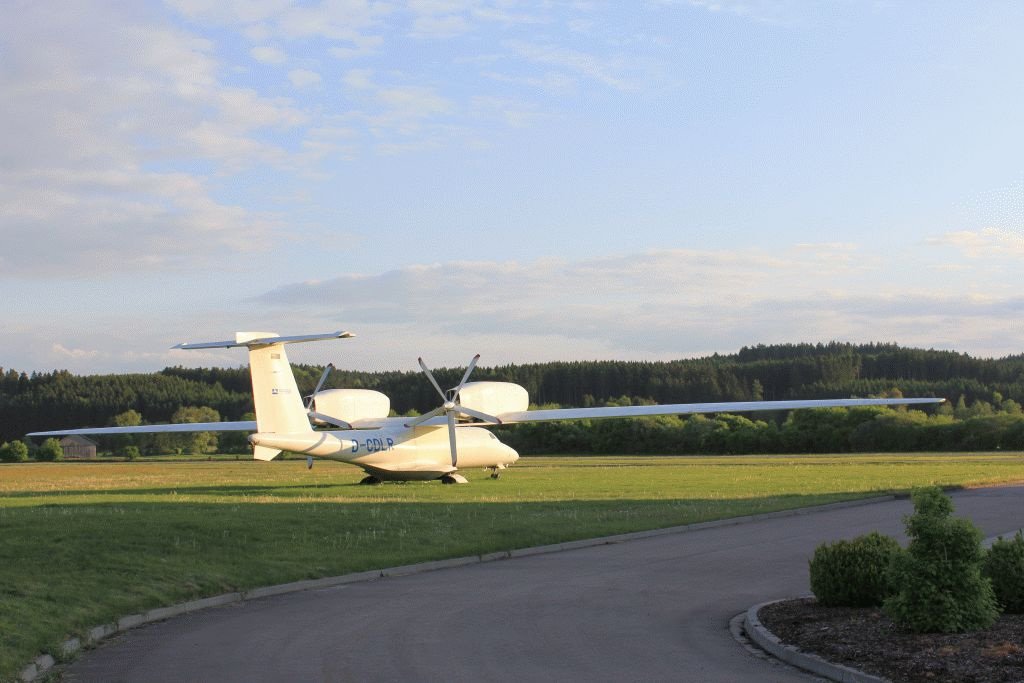

Data from Brassey's World Aircraft & Systems Directory 1999/2000, except where noted

General characteristics

- Crew: 4
- Length: 23.98 m (78 ft 8 in)
- Wingspan: 56.5 m (185 ft 4 in)
- Height: 7.76 m (25 ft 6 in)
- Wing area: 150 m^{2} (1,600 sq ft)
- Aspect ratio: 21.3
- Airfoil: DLR LH37
- Empty weight: 6,650 kg (14,661 lb)
- Max takeoff weight: 13,350 kg (29,432 lb)
- Powerplant: 2 × Teledyne Continental TSIOL-550-A liquid-cooled six-cylinder horizontally opposed piston engine, 300 kW (400 hp) each with three-stage turbocharging comprising a high-pressure turbocharger and a PW127-derived two-spool low-pressure turbocharger, with charge-air cooling after each compressor stage
- Propellers: 5-bladed MT-Propeller MTV-8-H-F constant-speed, feathering pusher propeller, 6 m (19 ft 8 in) diameter driven through a 4.87:1 two-stage reduction gearbox

Performance

- Maximum speed: Mach 0.56
- Cruise speed: 500 km/h (310 mph, 270 kn) at 24,000 m (78,740 ft) ^{[a]}
- Range: 18,100 km (11,200 mi, 9,800 nmi) for the 18,000 m (59,055 ft) long-endurance mission; 7,000 km (4,350 mi) for the 24,000 m (78,740 ft) high-altitude mission ^{[a]}

== See also ==
Related development

- Grob/E-Systems/AlliedSignal Egrett
