= Grob G103 =

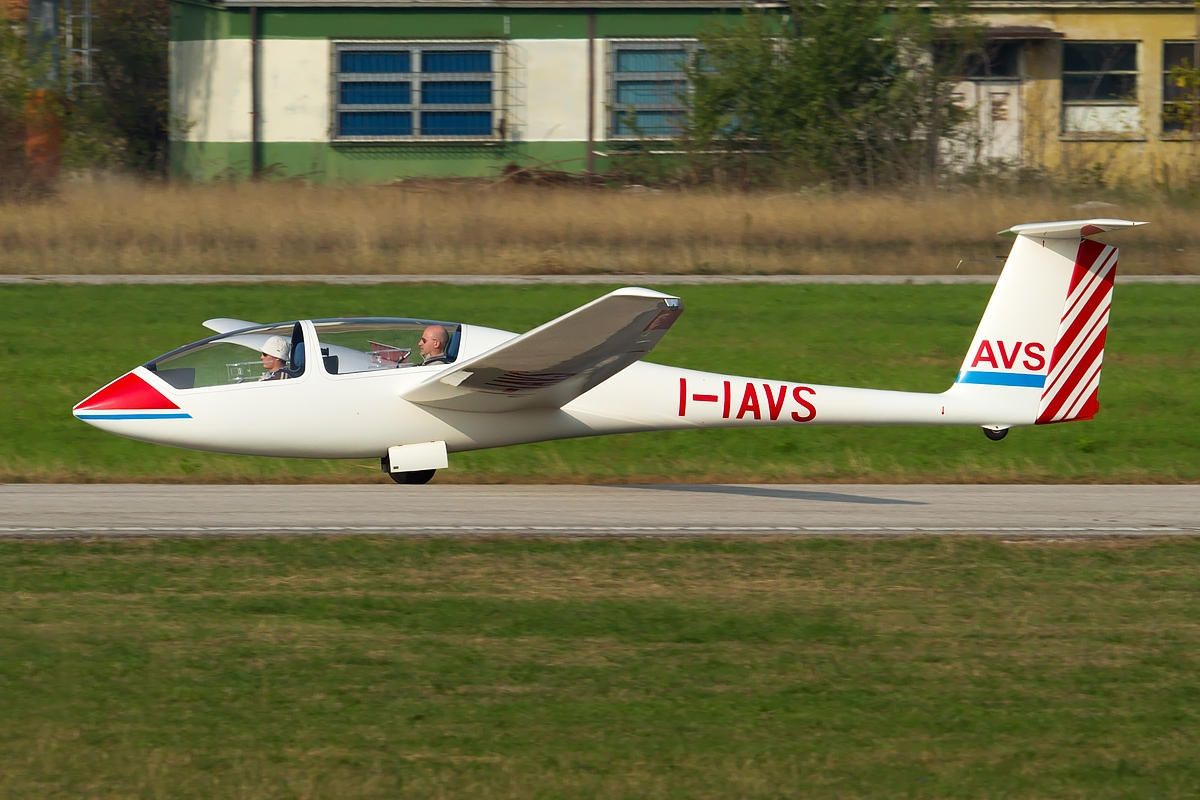
Twin Astir landing.

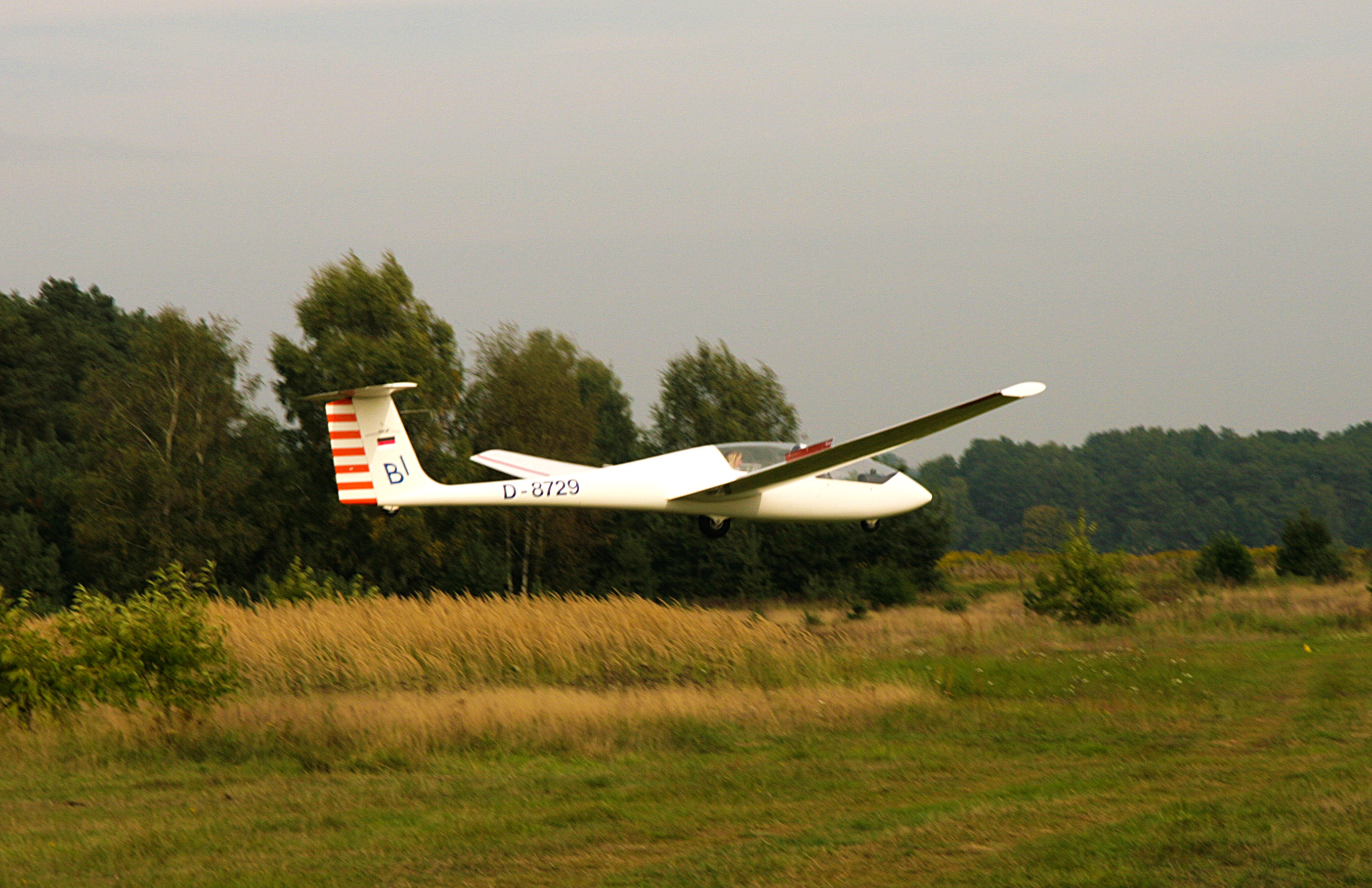
Twin II, with three wheel configuration.

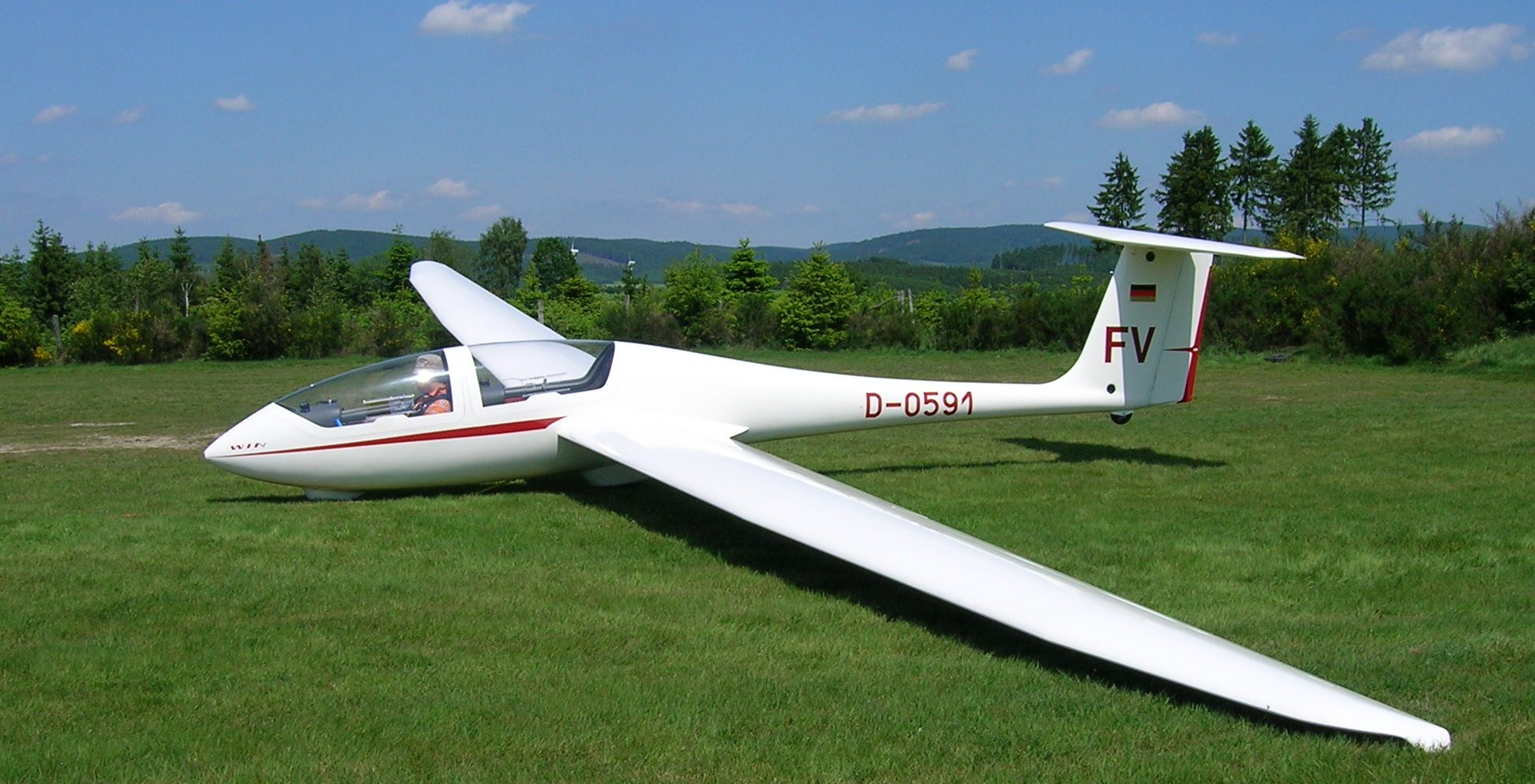
Twin III, with triple-trapezoidal wing.

The Grob G103 is a family of glass-reinforced plastic two-seat sailplanes developed in Germany by Grob Aircraft AG. The aircraft are of T-tail configuration and fitted with upper surface air brakes. They are designed for training, high performance soaring and basic aerobatic flying (Twin II Acro and Twin III Acro).

- Grob G103 Twin Astir Built since 1976, with retractable or fixed undercarriage in front of the center of gravity and water ballast.
- Grob G103a Twin II a new and unrelated design that replaced the Twin Astir from 1980, with fixed undercarriage behind the center of gravity and nose wheel.
- Grob G103c Twin III Replaced the Twin II from 1989, with a new triple-trapezoidal wing, lower control forces and higher airspeed limitations.
