= Grob G 116 =

G 116

General information
- Type: Civil utility aircraft
- National origin: Germany
- Manufacturer: Grob Aircraft
- Number built: 1

History
- First flight: April 1988

The Grob G 116 was a civil utility aircraft developed in Germany in the late 1980s. It was an enlarged and more powerful four-seat version of the two-seat Grob G 115. Like its predecessor, it was a conventional low-wing cantilever monoplane with fixed tricycle undercarriage. Also like the G 115, construction throughout was of composite materials.

Grob commenced displaying a highly realistic mock-up of the design in 1987, and a prototype flew the following year. However, by 1989 the firm became uncertain about the commercial viability of the aircraft in the face of heavy competition in the four-seat sector, and the project was first postponed and finally cancelled.

== Specifications ==
General characteristics

- Crew: One pilot
- Capacity: 3 passengers
- Length: 8.50 m (27 ft 11 in)
- Wingspan: 11.00 m (36 ft 1 in)
- Height: 3.00 m (9 ft 10 in)
- Wing area: 15.5 m^{2} (167 sq ft)
- Empty weight: 710 kg (1,565 lb)
- Gross weight: 1,198 kg (2,641 lb)
- Powerplant: 1 × Avco Lycoming O-360 , 134 kW (180 hp)

Performance

- Maximum speed: 285 km/h (177 mph, 154 kn)
- Range: 1,200 km (745 mi, 647 nmi)
- Rate of climb: 5.0 m/s (980 ft/min)
