= Grob GF 200 =

GF 200
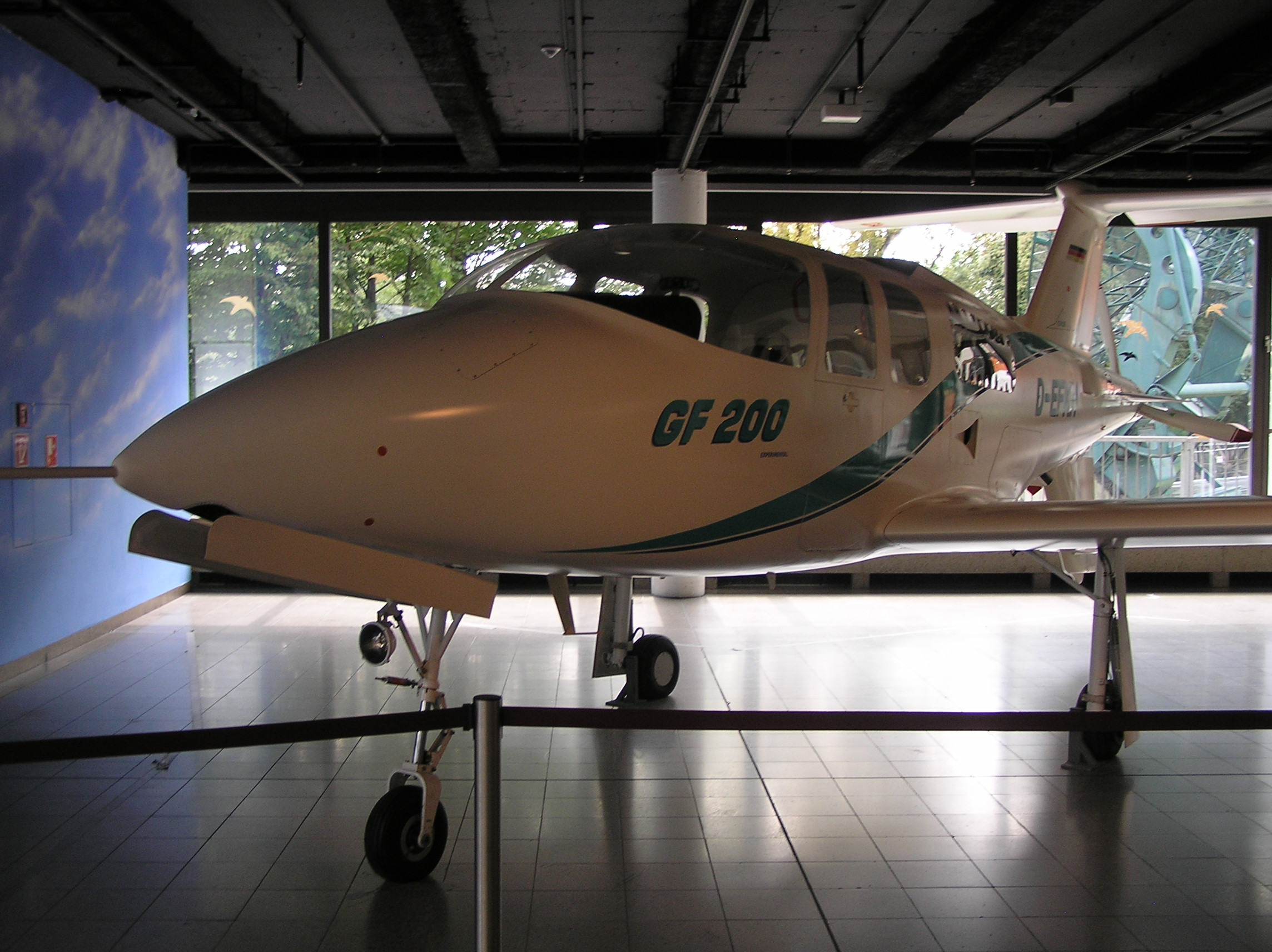

General information
- Type: Business aircraft
- National origin: Germany
- Manufacturer: Grob Aircraft
- Number built: 1

History
- First flight: 26 November 1991

The Grob GF 200 was a business aircraft of unorthodox design developed in Germany during the 1990s.

== Design and development ==
The GF 200 was a low-wing cantilever monoplane with retractable tricycle undercarriage and a highly streamlined fuselage. The engine was mounted within the fuselage, to the rear of the passenger cabin, and drove the pusher propeller via a driveshaft. The GF 200 has a T-tail, but also a large ventral fin beneath the fuselage. Like other Grob designs, construction throughout was of composite materials, in the case of this particular aircraft, including the driveshaft.

Development commenced in 1983 but was postponed due to concerns about achieving certification for the composite design. However, with financial support from the German government, development commenced in earnest by the end of the decade. The project officially launched at the Hannover Show in May 1988, at which a mockup of the design was displayed and a hope expressed to have the aircraft flying within two years.

== Operational history ==
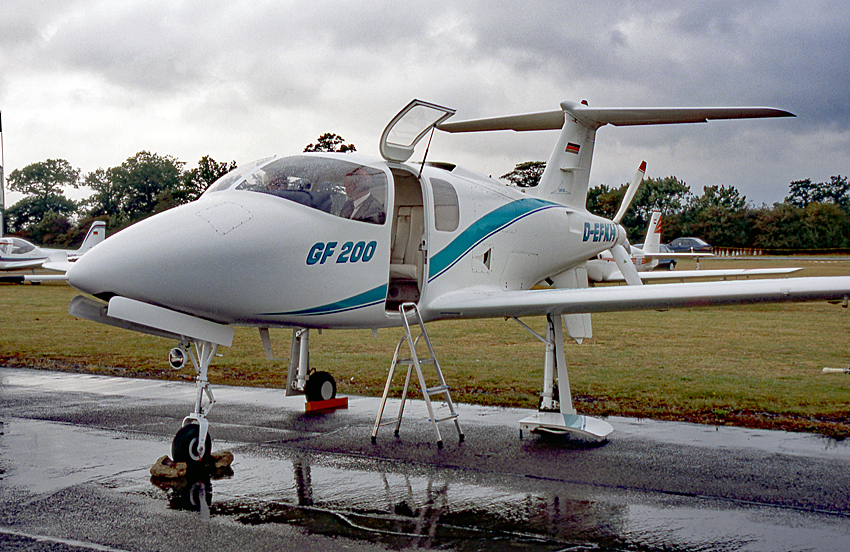
D-EFKH Grob GF 200 at North Weald Airfield in 1995

As it transpired, the prototype was rolled out in March 1991, in the hope of a first flight by May, and which finally took place on 26 November. The aircraft made its first public appearance at the Berlin Air Show in 1992. Initial flight tests revealed problems with engine cooling and excessive noise. The former concern was addressed by a redesign of the engine air intakes.

The prototype was intended as a test aircraft and technology demonstrator, and lacked many of the refinements that would have been incorporated into a production aircraft, including cabin pressurisation, de-icing equipment, and even a complete cabin interior. When Grob was unable to find financial backing to take the design further, the company embarked on the construction of a more "true-to-life" prototype in 1997, the GF 250, in the belief that this would prove more attractive to potential business partners.

Further planned developments included the turboshaft-powered GF 300, and the GF 350 with twin turboshaft engines driving a common propeller.

== Specifications (GF 200) ==
Data from Jane's All The World's Aircraft 1992–93

General characteristics

- Crew: One (pilot)
- Capacity: 3 passengers
- Length: 8.50 m (27 ft 11 in)
- Wingspan: 11.00 m (36 ft 1 in)
- Height: 3.20 m (10 ft 6 in)
- Wing area: 12.53 m^{2} (134.9 sq ft)
- Max takeoff weight: 1,450 kg (3,197 lb)
- Fuel capacity: 350 L (92 US gal; 77 imp gal)
- Powerplant: 1 × Textron Lycoming TIO-540-AF1A air-cooled flat-six engine, 200 kW (270 hp)
- Propellers: 3-bladed Mühlbauer constant-speed pusher, 2.00 m (6 ft 7 in) diameter

Performance

- Cruise speed: 445 km/h (277 mph, 240 kn) (max cruise)
- Range: 2,650 km (1,650 mi, 1,430 nmi)
- Service ceiling: 7,620 m (25,000 ft)
- Rate of climb: 6.2 m/s (1,220 ft/min)
- Take-off run to 15 m (50 ft): 600 m (2,000 ft)
- Landing run from 15 m (50 ft): 450 m (1,480 ft)

== See also ==
Aircraft of comparable role, configuration, and era

- Cirrus VK-30
- LearAvia Lear Fan
