= Grob G103c Twin III =

German two-seat glider, 1989

G103C Twin III
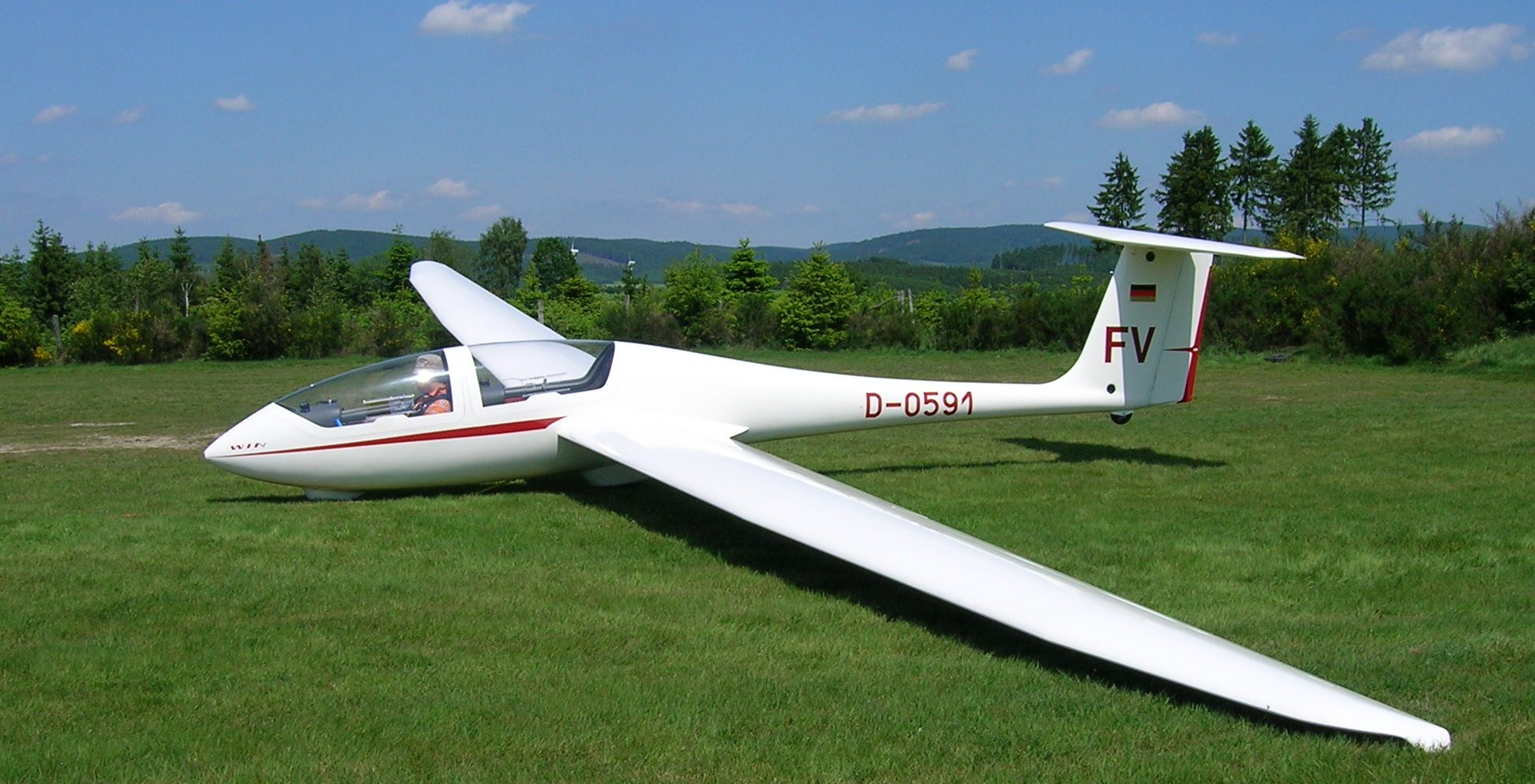

General information
- Type: Two-Seater Class sailplane
- National origin: Germany
- Manufacturer: Grob Aircraft, now LTB Lindner
- Status: Production completed
- Number built: 115 (13 Twin III and 102 Twin III Acro)

History
- Introduction date: 1989
- Developed from: Twin II
- Variant: Twin Astir

The G103C Twin III is a high performance tandem two-seat sailplane made by Grob Aircraft. It replaced the Twin II in production and features a new triple-trapezoidal wing, automatic elevator connection, lower control forces and higher airspeed limitations.

Most Twin IIIs (102 of 115 built) were Twin III Acro models, with G-Limits of +6/-4g. However, aerobatic maneuvers were limited in 2003 by an airworthiness directive and could only be reinstated with fuselage reinforcements.

== Specifications (Twin III Acro) ==
Data from manufacturer

General characteristics

- Crew: 1
- Capacity: 1 passenger
- Length: 8.18 m (26 ft 10 in)
- Wingspan: 18 m (59 ft 1 in)
- Height: 1.55 m (5 ft 1 in)
- Wing area: 17.5 m^{2} (188 sq ft)
- Aspect ratio: 17.1
- Gross weight: 600 kg (1,323 lb)

Performance

- Never exceed speed: 280 km/h (170 mph, 150 kn) (manoeuvering speed 185 km/h)
- g limits: +6 -4
- Maximum glide ratio: 38

== See also ==
- Grob G103 family
- Grob G103 Twin Astir
- Grob G103a Twin II
