= Grob G 140TP =

2000s German aircraft

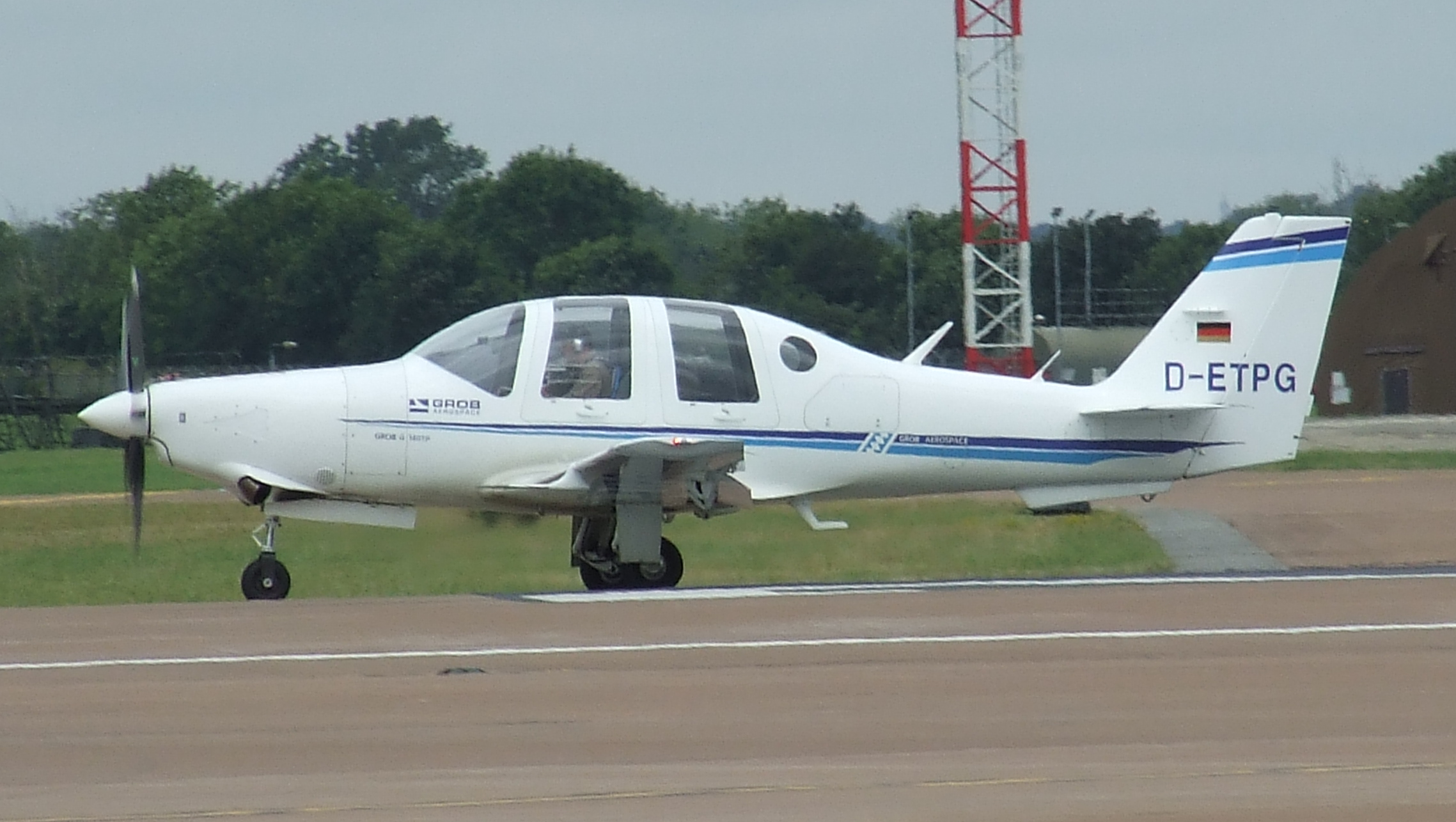

General information
- Type: Trainer
- National origin: Germany
- Manufacturer: Grob Aircraft
- Status: Active in production

History
- Manufactured: 2003-present
- First flight: 12 December 2002

The Grob G140TP is a four-seat light aircraft built by Grob Aircraft.

== Development ==
The aircraft was presented at the Paris Air Show in 2001 and completed its maiden flight on December 12, 2002. Powered by a Rolls-Royce 250-B17F turboprop engine, the Grob G 140TP is fully aerobatic capable. So far, Grob Aircraft has not decided to resume construction of the G 140. The Grob G 140TP could have been certified in the utility and aerobatic classes, with the utility version being used as a reconnaissance aircraft.

== Specifications (G 140TP) ==
Data from

General characteristics

- Crew: 2
- Capacity: 4
- Length: 8.9 m (29 ft 2 in)
- Wingspan: 10.6 m (34 ft 9 in)
- Height: 2.8 m (9 ft 2 in)
- Wing area: 13.3 m^{2} (143 sq ft)
- Empty weight: 800 kg (1,764 lb)
- Max takeoff weight: 1,500 kg (3,307 lb)
- Fuel capacity: 256 litres (56 imp gal; 68 US gal)
- Powerplant: 1 × Rolls-Royce 250-B17F turboprop engine, 340 kW (460 hp)
- Propellers: 3-bladed

Performance

- Maximum speed: 425 km/h (264 mph, 229 kn)with full flaps
- Range: 1,850 km (1,150 mi, 1,000 nmi)
- g limits: +6/-4G
