= Grob G 120 =

German light aircraft

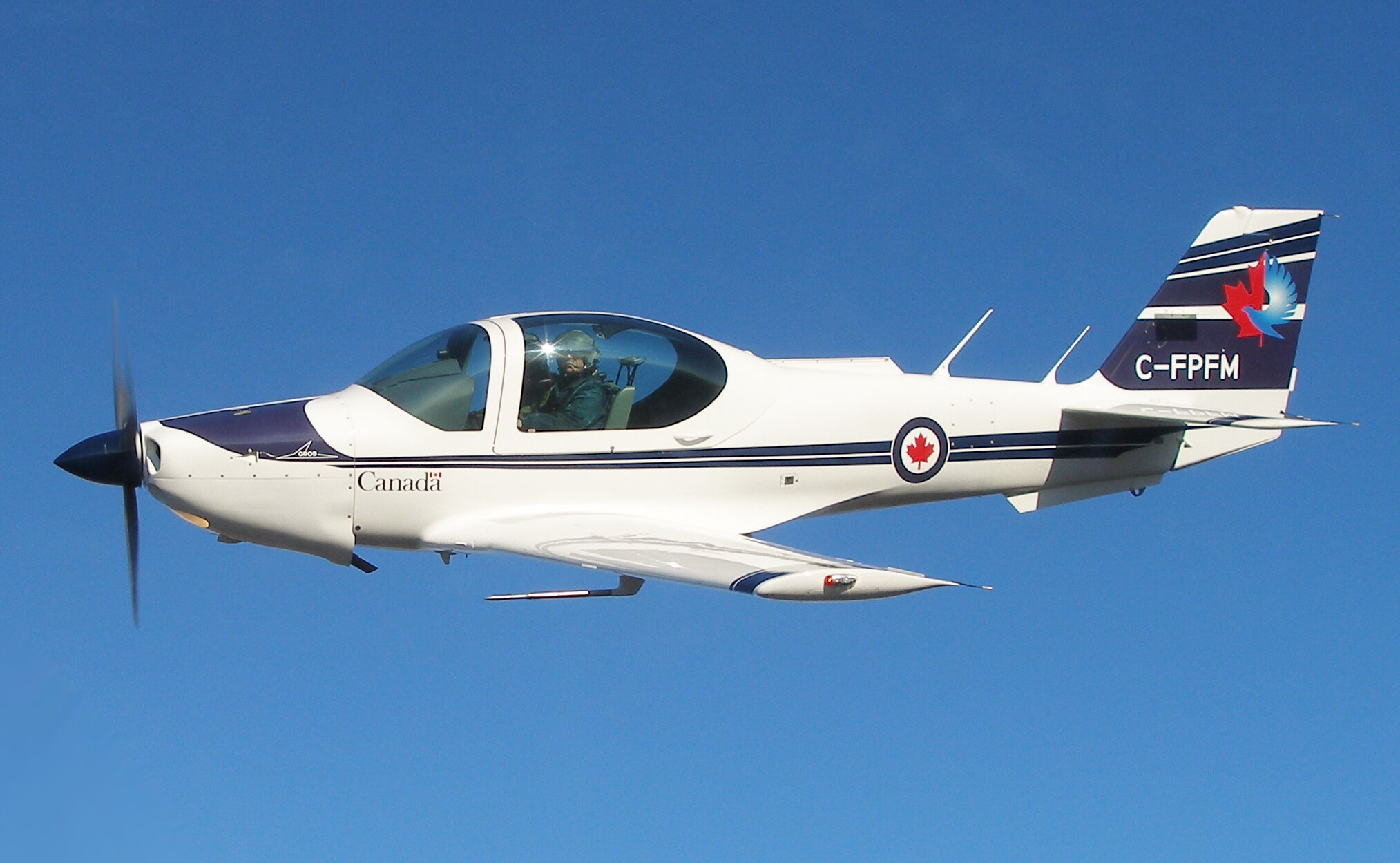
- A Grob G 120A from a Canadian flight school

General information
- Type: Trainer
- National origin: Germany
- Manufacturer: Grob Aircraft
- Status: Active in production
- Primary users: French Air and Space Force Israeli Air Force; Royal Canadian Air Force; German Air Force

History
- Manufactured: 1999-present
- First flight: 1999
- Developed from: Grob G 115
- Variant: Grob G 120TP

The Grob G 120 is a two-seat training and aerobatic low-wing aircraft with a carbon composite airframe, built by Grob Aircraft. It is based on the Grob G 115TA training aircraft and is specially designed for military and civil pilots training. It has a retractable tricycle landing gear and a low tailplane.

== Design and development ==
The airframe is made of carbon fibre reinforced plastic and is stressed to +6/-4g. Its minimum service life is just over 15,000 flight hours.

The cockpit provides room for students wearing military equipment and helmets. The plane is equipped with movable seats and rudder pedals and an air conditioning system. A second thrust lever is available.

== Variants ==
G 120A
Piston powered version with a Lycoming AEIO-540-D4D5 six cylinder, four-stroke, air-cooled piston aircraft engine producing 260 hp (194 kW).

G 120TP
Turboprop powered version with a Rolls-Royce 250-B17F aircraft engine producing 456 shp (340 kW) for take-off and 380 shp (283 kW) for maximum cruise.

== Operators ==
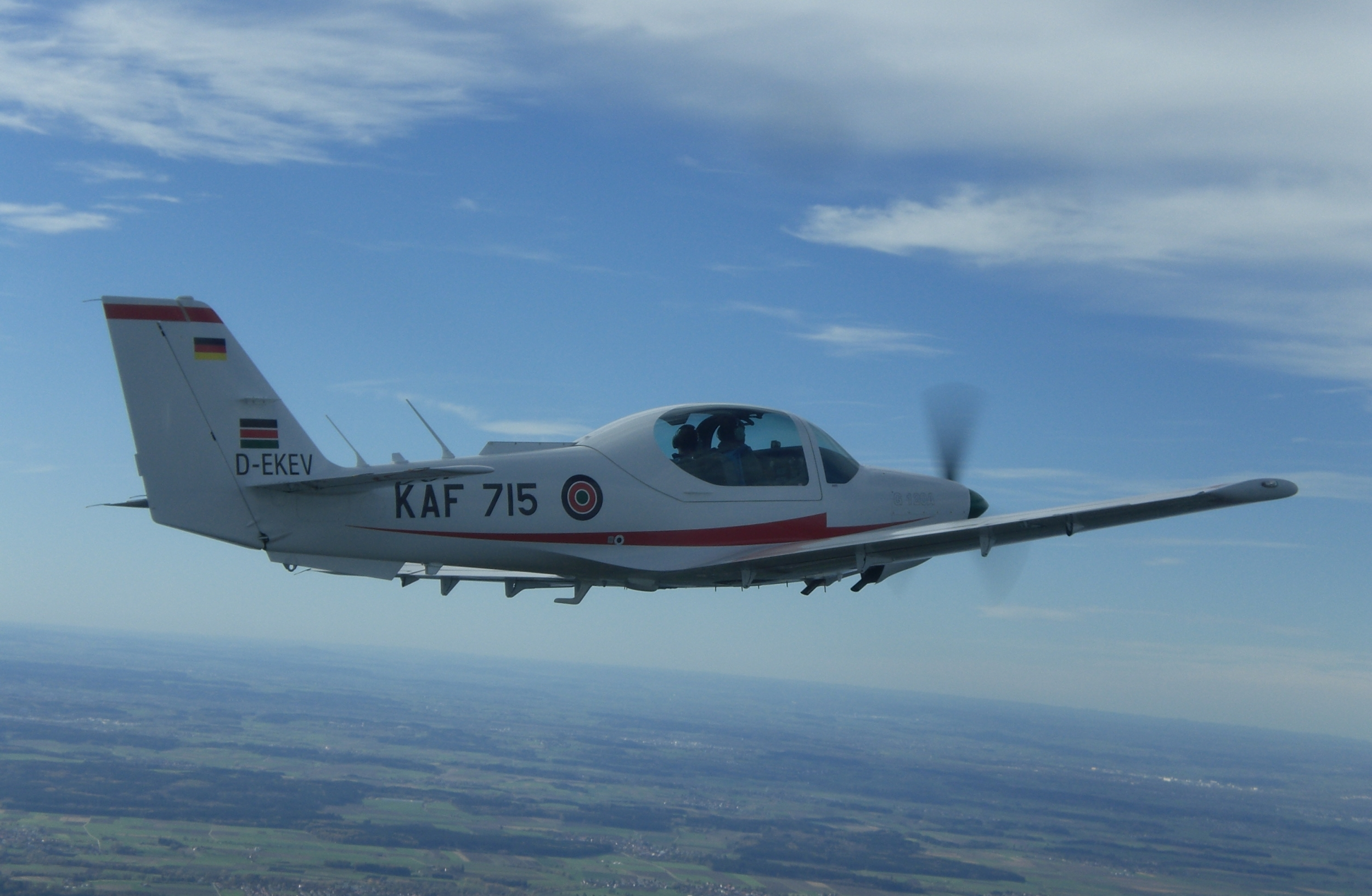
One of six G 120A of the Kenya Air Force

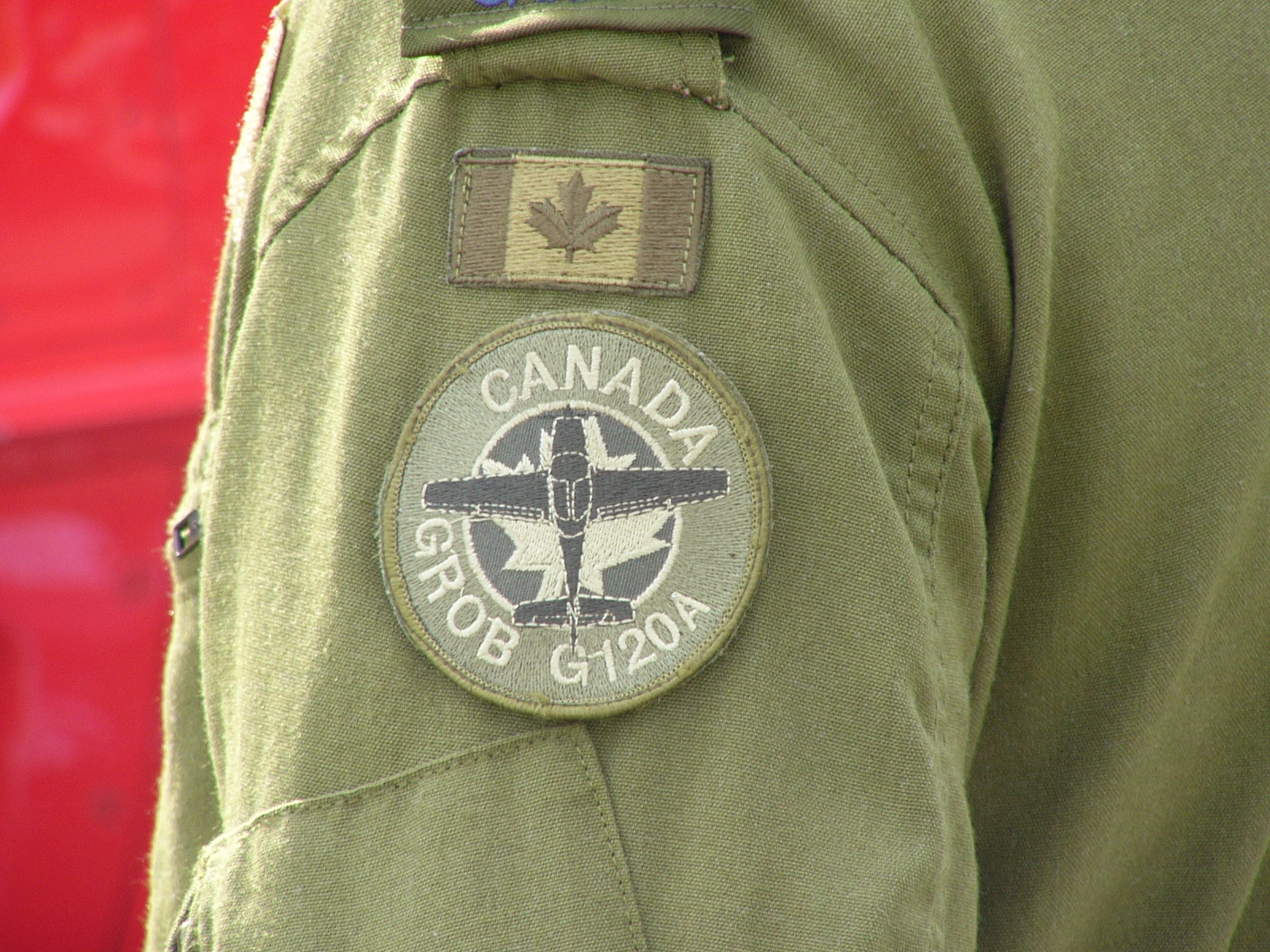
Grob G-120A badge worn by a Canadian military student pilot from 3 CFFTS

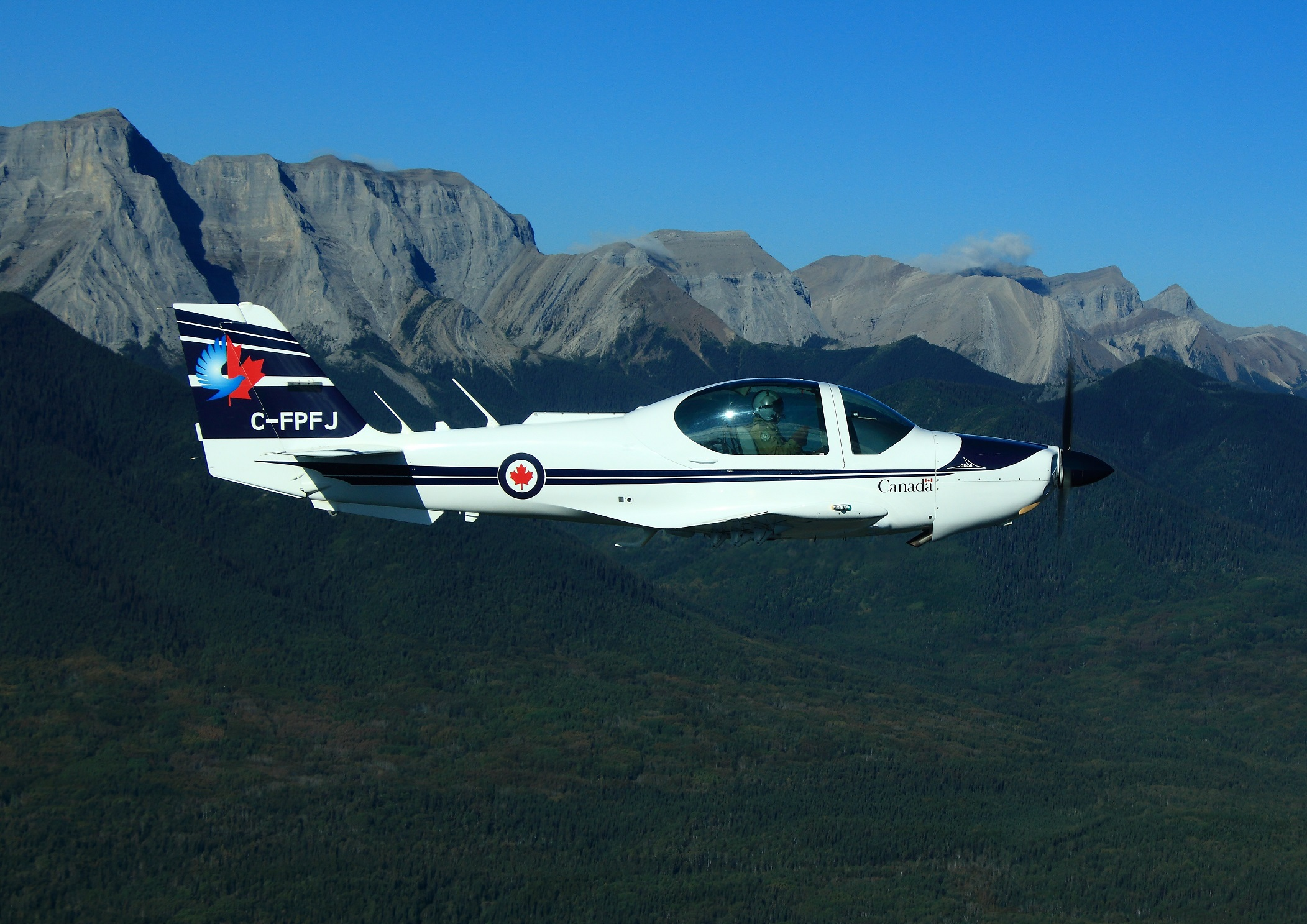
Grob G120A used by RCAF

Canada

- KF Defence Programs: 14 for training of Canadian Armed Forces (until 2013) and Royal Canadian Air Force (from 2013) pilots. In Canadian service the aircraft is also known as the CT-102A Astra.

France

- French Air and Space Force: 18

Germany

- German Air Force: 6

Israel

- Israeli Air Force: 17 The Snunit used by the IAF has a Lycoming AEIO-540-D4D5 engine that produces a maximum speed of 235 km/h (127 kn).

Kenya

- Kenya Air Force: 6

== Specifications (G 120A) ==
Data from Jane's All The World's Aircraft 2003–2004

General characteristics

- Crew: Two
- Length: 8.605 m (28 ft 3 in)
- Wingspan: 10.19 m (33 ft 5 in)
- Height: 2.57 m (8 ft 5 in)
- Wing area: 13.29 m^{2} (143.1 sq ft)
- Airfoil: Eppler E884
- Empty weight: 960 kg (2,116 lb)
- Gross weight: 1,440 kg (3,175 lb)
- Max takeoff weight: 1,490 kg (3,285 lb) (Utility)
- Fuel capacity: 256 litres (56 imp gal; 68 US gal)
- Powerplant: 1 × Lycoming AEIO-540-D4D5 air-cooled flat-six, 190 kW (260 hp)
- Propellers: 3-bladed Hartzell HC-C3YR-1RF/F7663R, 1.98 m (6 ft 6 in) diameter

Performance

- Maximum speed: 319 km/h (198 mph, 172 kn)
- Cruise speed: 307 km/h (191 mph, 166 kn) at 75% power (1,500 m (5,000 ft))
- Stall speed: 102 km/h (63 mph, 55 kn) with full flaps
- Never exceed speed: 435 km/h (270 mph, 235 kn)
- Range: 1,540 km (960 mi, 830 nmi) at 8,000 ft (2,400 m) and 45% power)
- Endurance: 6.35 hours at 10,000 ft and maximum endurance power setting
- Service ceiling: 5,500 m (18,000 ft)
- g limits: +6/-4G
- Rate of climb: 6.5 m/s (1,280 ft/min)

Avionics

- Garmin avionics

== See also ==
Related development

- Grob G 115
- Grob G 120TP

Aircraft of comparable role, configuration, and era

- Aermacchi SF.260
- Beechcraft T-34 Mentor
- ENAER T-35 Pillán
- Fuji T-3
- Lasta 95
- PAC CT/4 Airtrainer
- Socata TB-31 Omega
