= Grob Aircraft =

German aircraft manufacturer

Coordinates: 48°06′43″N 10°31′25″E

Grob Aircraft SE
- Formerly: Grob Aerospace
- Type: Subsidiary
- Industry: Aerospace
- Founded: 1971; 55 years ago in Germany
- Founder: Burkhart Grob
- Headquarters: Tussenhausen, Germany
- Key people: Wolfgang Gammel (CEO)
- Products: Aircraft
- Number of employees: 275 (2025)
- Parent: H3 Aerospace GmbH & Co KG (2009–2025); Helsing SE (2025–present)
- Website: www.grob-aircraft.com

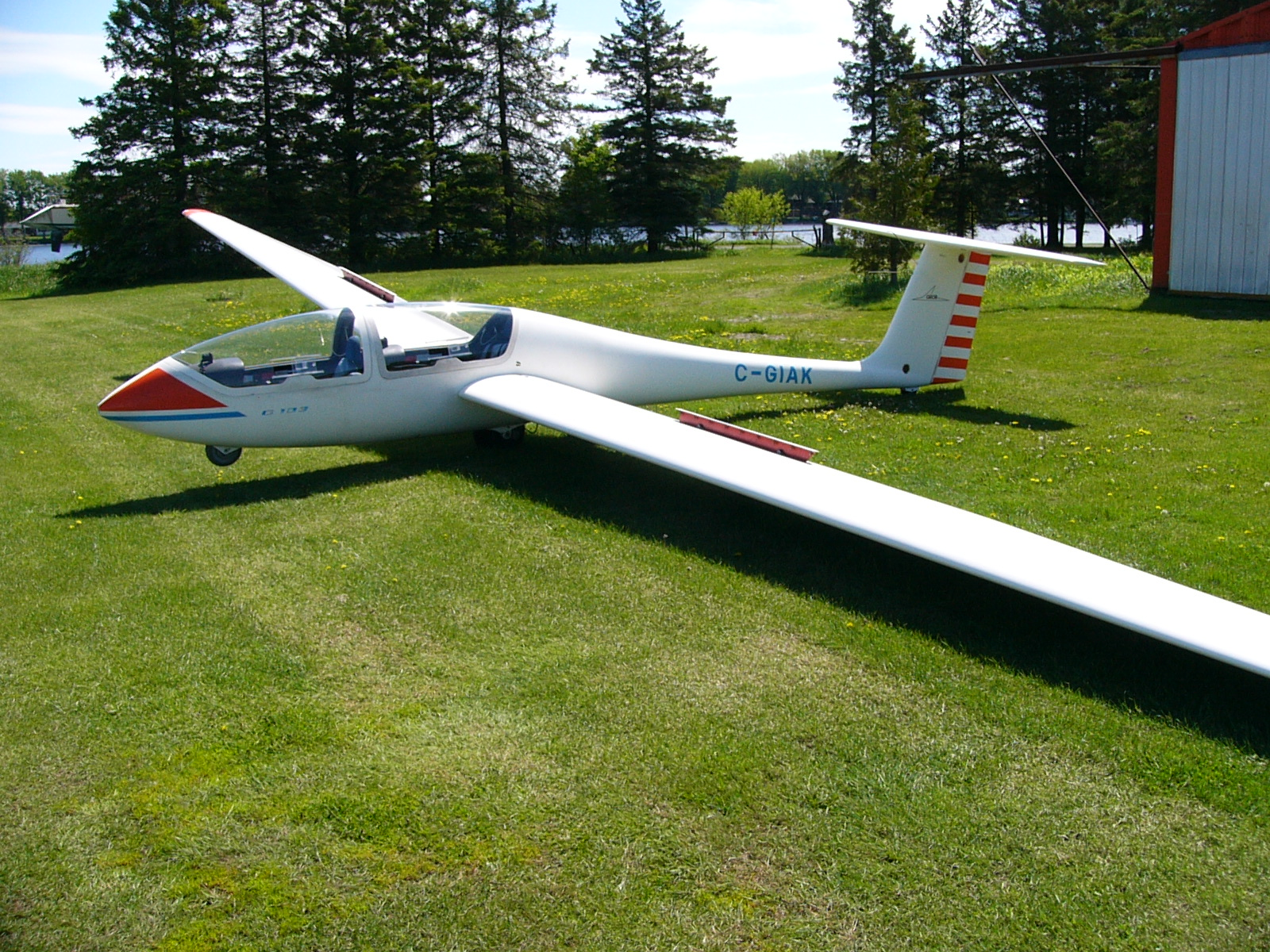
Grob G 103 Twin Astir sailplane

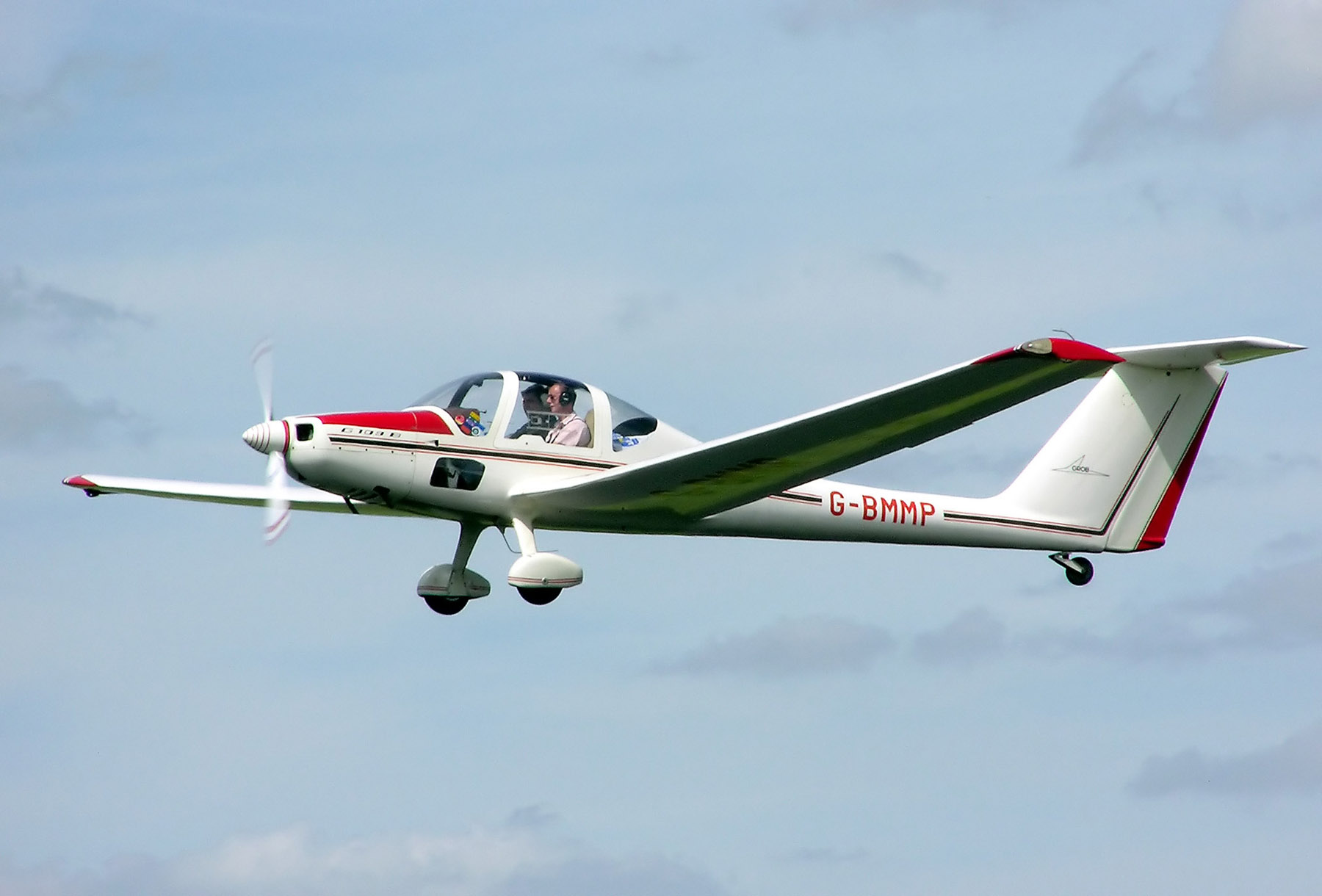
Grob G 109 B motor glider, built in 1986

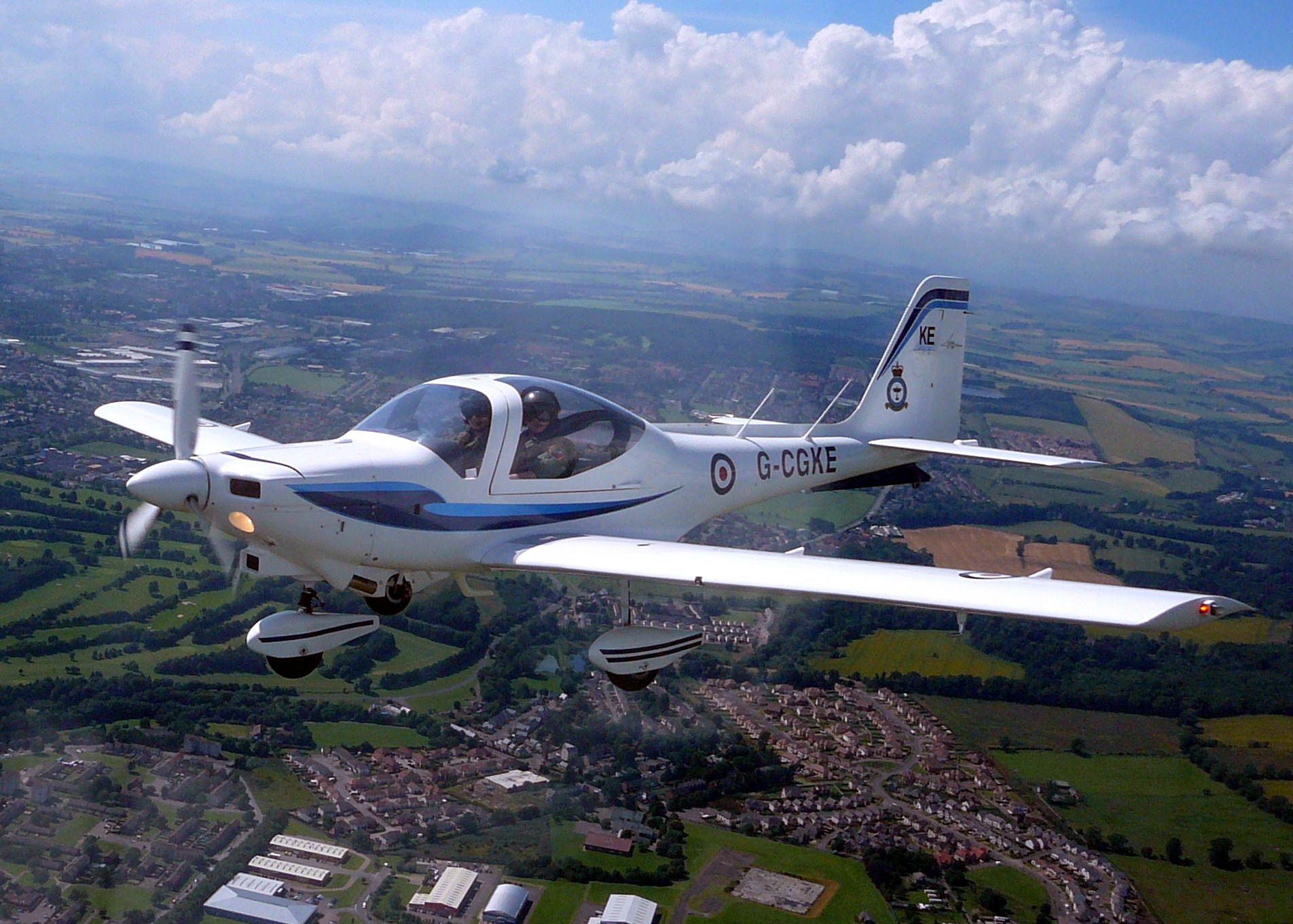
Grob 115E 'Tutor T1' operated by the Royal Air Force

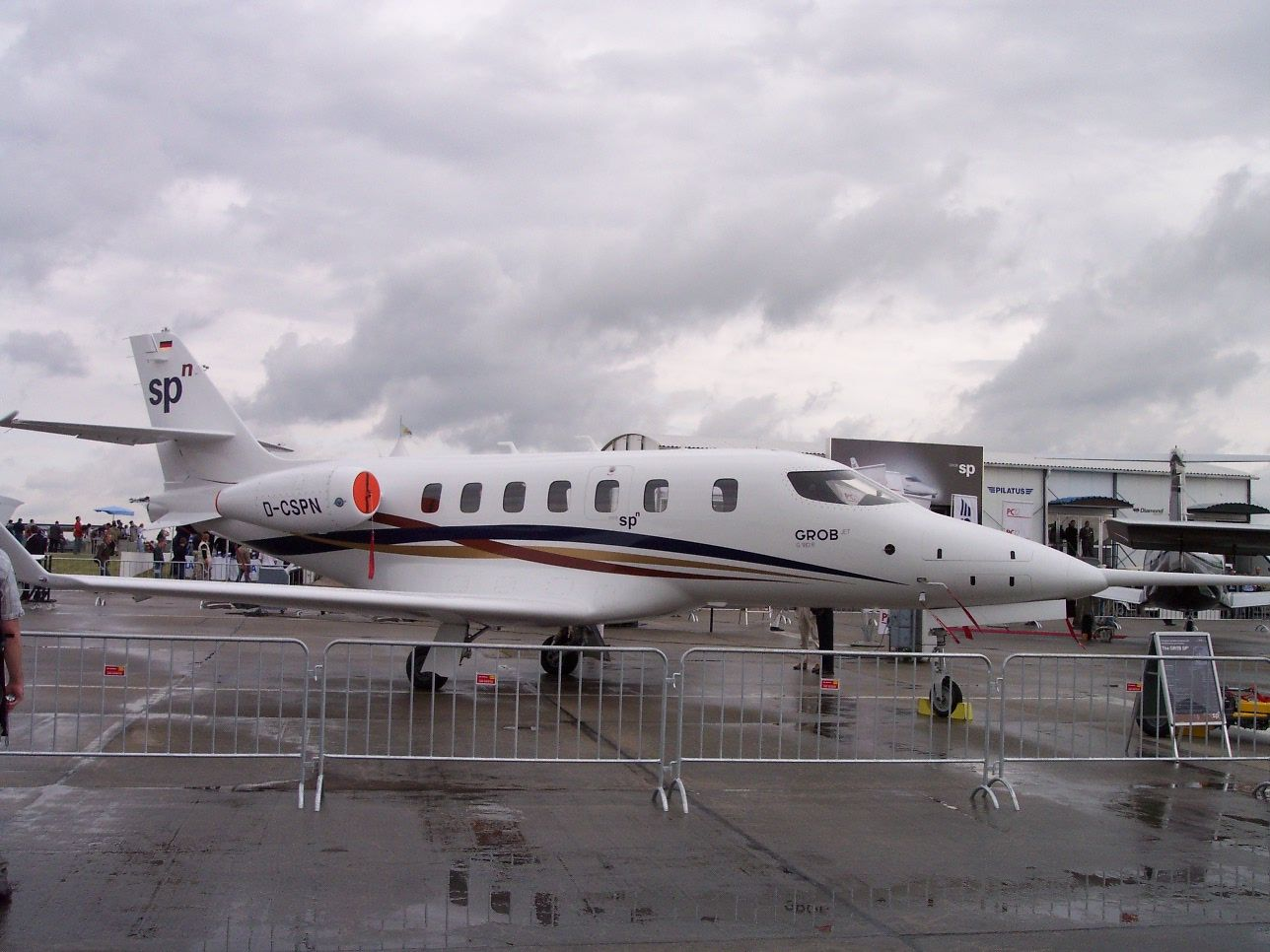
Grob SP^{n}

Grob Aircraft SE, formerly Grob Aerospace, is a German aircraft manufacturer, specialising in gliders and general aviation.

Since its foundation in 1971, Grob Aircraft produced a range of aircraft. Initially focusing on gliders, it soon grew into other markets. The company has produced a range of trainer aircraft, many of which have been operated in quantity by a number of military air wings. It has also produced specialised high-altitude intelligence surveillance and reconnaissance (ISR) aircraft. According to Grob Aircraft, it has delivered over 4,500 airframes which have cumulatively flown over seven million hours across hundreds of operators spread over five continents.

Since the 1970s, the copious use of carbon fiber reinforced polymer in the manufacture of its aircraft has been a hallmark of the firm's designs. Over 75% of the components of its aircraft, including composite (carbon fibre and glass fibre reinforced polymer) elements, are manufactured in-house at the firm's facility located at the Mindelheim-Mattsies Airfield in Tussenhausen-Mattsies, Bavaria.

== History ==
=== Early activities ===
The company was founded as Grob Aerospace during 1971 by Dr. Burkhart Grob (26 March 1926 - 20 May 2016). Dr. Grob had been a qualified pilot as well as a mechanical engineer who ran a business producing machine tooling prior to creating the company; he had been inspired to produce his own glider after being informed of the lengthy production time involved in glider production at the time, convinced that it could be done better. Accordingly, Grob Aerospace had been founded with the vision of producing full-composite gliders that would be highly cost-competitive while facilitating a high rate of construction.

At the onset of operations, Grob Aerospace was involved in the production of gliders, having quickly secured subcontracting work from the existing German manufacturer Schempp-Hirth to build the firm's Standard Cirrus glider under licence. In excess of 200 Standard Cirruses were produced by Grob, the initial example being constructed at its machining workshop in Mindelheim. As the firm's production capacity expanded, Grob Aerospace relocated its operational base to a larger facility at the newly established Tussenhausen-Mattsies airfield.

In 1974, Grob began to pursue independent glider production, harnessing its accumulated experience with composite construction. Instead of producing gliders that directly competed with the larger established manufacturers, the company differentiated its product by orientating itself towards the club market and adopting competitive pricing for its new product, the G-102 Astir, the first Grob-designed glider. During its long production life, over a thousand examples of the type would be produced. The G-102 was quickly followed by the larger two-seat G 103 Twin Astir line of sailplanes.

=== Powered aircraft ===
During the late 1970s, Grob also branched out into motorised aircraft, developing the G 109. First flown on 14 March 1980, it was the world's first production all-composite motor glider upon receiving its type certification from the Federal Aviation Administration (FAA) in 1981. In addition to widespread civilian use of the type, perhaps the most prominent operator of the G 109 was the Royal Air Force, who adopted it for their Volunteer Gliding Squadrons (VGS) to train Air Cadets through the Gliding Induction and Gliding Scholarship courses up until 5 May 2018; in RAF service, the Grob 109B was designated Vigilant T1.

The G 109 was only the start of Grob Aerospace's motorised aircraft lineup. It was followed by the larger G 115, an all-composite two-seat aerobatic monoplane, which received certification from the FAA during 1987. Not all of the firm's designs were taken forward into production; the GF 200, a relatively unorthodox business aircraft, flew during the early 1990s but never progressed beyond test flights. The G160 Ranger, another business aircraft somewhat similar to the Pilatus PC-12, similarly did not enter production. During 1996, Grob Aerospace decided to end production of gliders in favour of concentrating its manufacturing base on its powered aircraft instead.

During the 1980s, Grob Aerospace partnered with American defense firm E-Systems and engine manufacturer Garrett to develop the G 520, otherwise known as Egrett/STRATO 1, a specialised high-altitude aircraft. First flown on 24 June 1987, the type soon established five world records. During 1992, the German Air Force placed an order for a batch of nine EGRETT II aircraft, as well as for a single two-seat trainer and one of the demonstrators. However, in February 1993, the German order was cancelled; this outcome was attributed to the peace dividend following the collapse of the Soviet Union and a decrease in military tensions.

=== SP^{n} program ===
During the mid-2000s, Grob Aerospace secretively embarked on a jet-powered light aircraft programme, the Grob G180 SP^{n}. In response to perceived market demand, this aircraft would possess both the short-field and cargo-carrying performance traditionally associated with turboprop-powered aircraft, as well as the extensive use of composite materials. The aircraft's requirements were defined in close collaboration with the Swiss-based company ExecuJet Aviation Group. Following its public unveiling, it was initially referred to as the SPn Utility Jet. Plans for a family of aircraft based on the type were mooted at one stage. During June 2005, Grob Aerospace president Dr Andreas Plesske stated of the G180 SPn: "We have created a new category of jet aircraft".

The G180 SPn performed its maiden flight on 20 July 2005. The second prototype crashed shortly after takeoff on 29 November 2006 close to the production plant in Germany; chief test pilot Gérard Guillaumaud, the aircraft's sole occupant, was killed. During February 2007, following a three-month break, flight testing resumed; by this point, certification was targeted for early 2008.

During November 2008, development of the G180 SPn was put on hold by the insolvency of Grob Aerospace. Prior to the company's collapse, around 100 orders had been secured for the G180, which had a list price of €5.9 million ($8.7 million). While subsequent attempts had been made to raise investment to resume development, these came amid the Great Recession. Grob Aerospace's largest creditor did not approve the sale of the G180 SPn to Guizhou Aircraft Industry Corporation. Niall Olver, Grob Aerospace's former CEO, was appointed by the creditor to find new investors to buy the assets of the G180 SPn with the aim of restarting the program by June 2009. During March 2009, Olver indicated that the then-current plan was to complete certification and commence production near the middle of 2012. The rights to the aircraft became the property of Allied Aviation Technologies.

=== 2008 insolvency ===
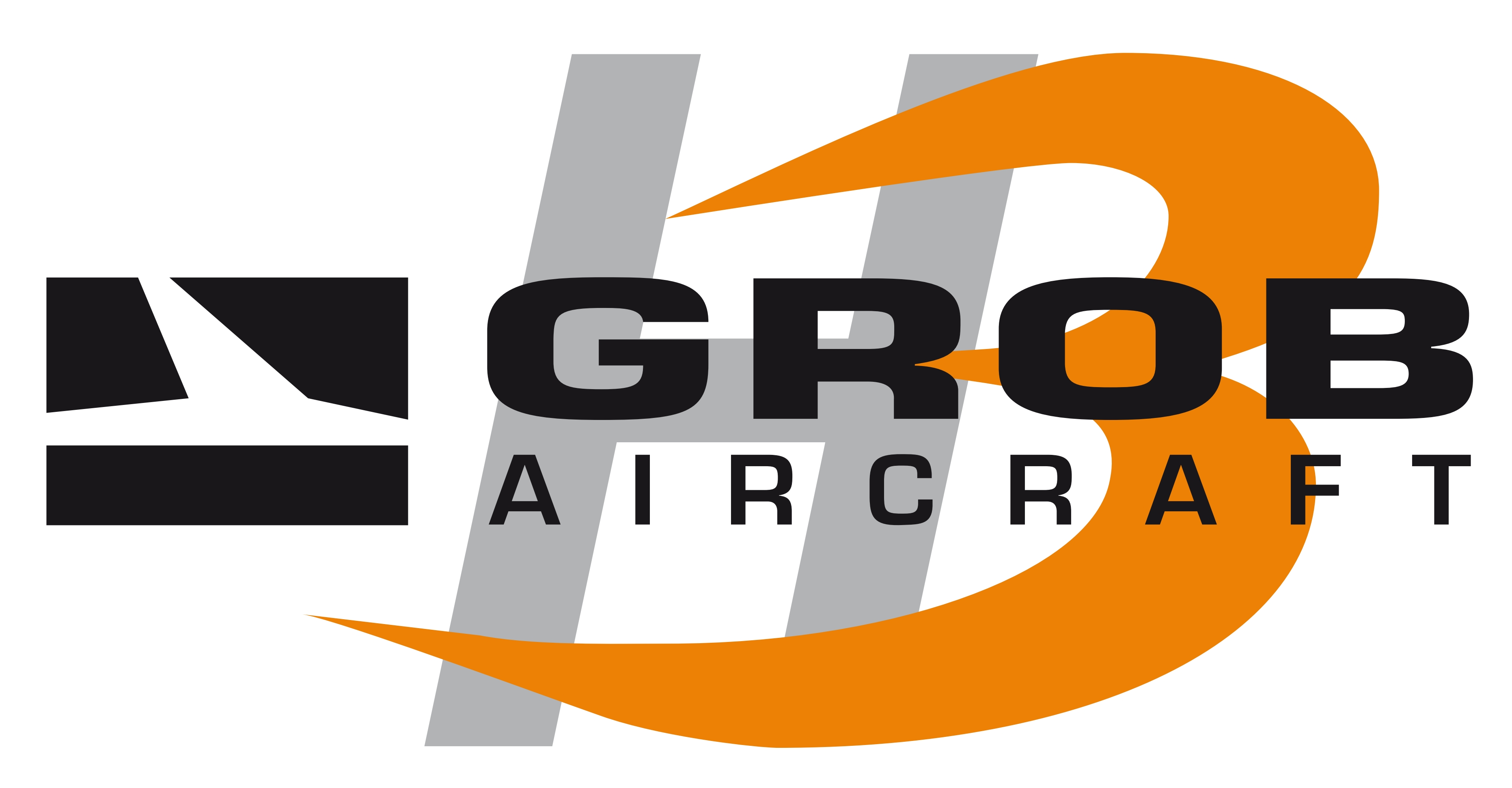
Initial Grob H3 logo

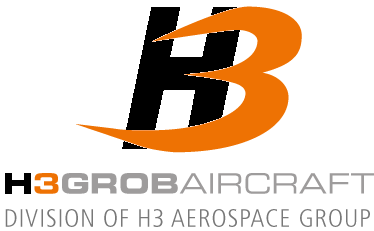
Second iteration of Grob H3 logo

On 18 August 2008, Grob Aerospace filed for insolvency. As a consequence, the firm suspended the majority of its activities, including all light-jet production; this shutdown raised questions over the timely delivery of Bombardier Aerospace's Learjet 85 prototypes, of which Grob had been contracted to produce. While efforts were made to seek new investors to rescue the company, most of Grob's employees were released on 3 November 2008. Niall Olver, Grob's chief executive officer, stated of the suspension:

This unfortunate situation has arisen fairly rapidly off the back of recent delays in the SPn program, resulting in commensurately increased cash requirement to see the aircraft through to certification. Our current loan provider has elected to discontinue support, with immediate effect.

On 16 December 2008, Grob insolvency administrator, Dr. Michael Jaffé, announced that two parties had expressed interest in taking over the insolvent company, Munich based H3 Aerospace and the Chinese Guizhou Aircraft Industry Corporation. Both companies offered around $4.5 million for Grob, while Guizhou had also offered an additional $3.5 million to separately acquire the SPn jet program.

=== Acquisition by Helsing ===
In June 2025, German defence technology company Helsing SE agreed to acquire Grob from H3 Aerospace, aiming to integrate its AI and software with Grob's manufacturing to develop AI-powered reconnaissance and combat aircraft.

== Grob Aircraft AG ==
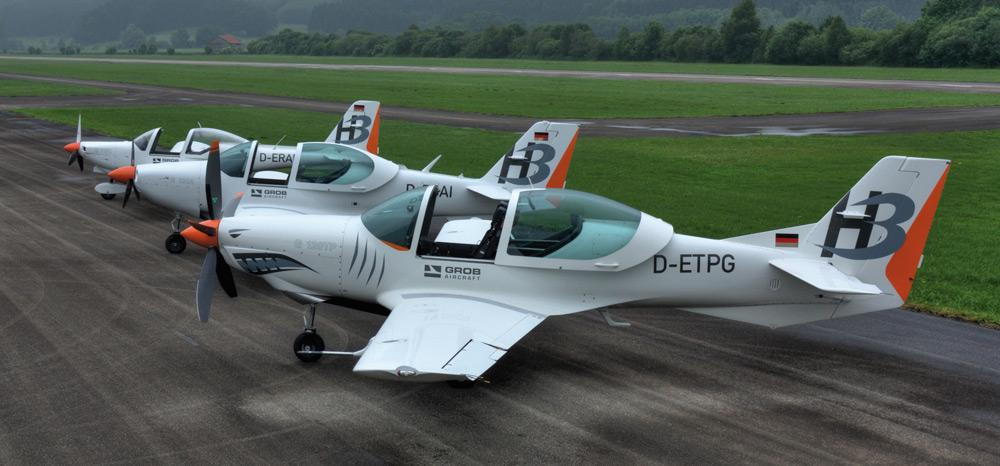
G 120TP, G 120A, G 115E

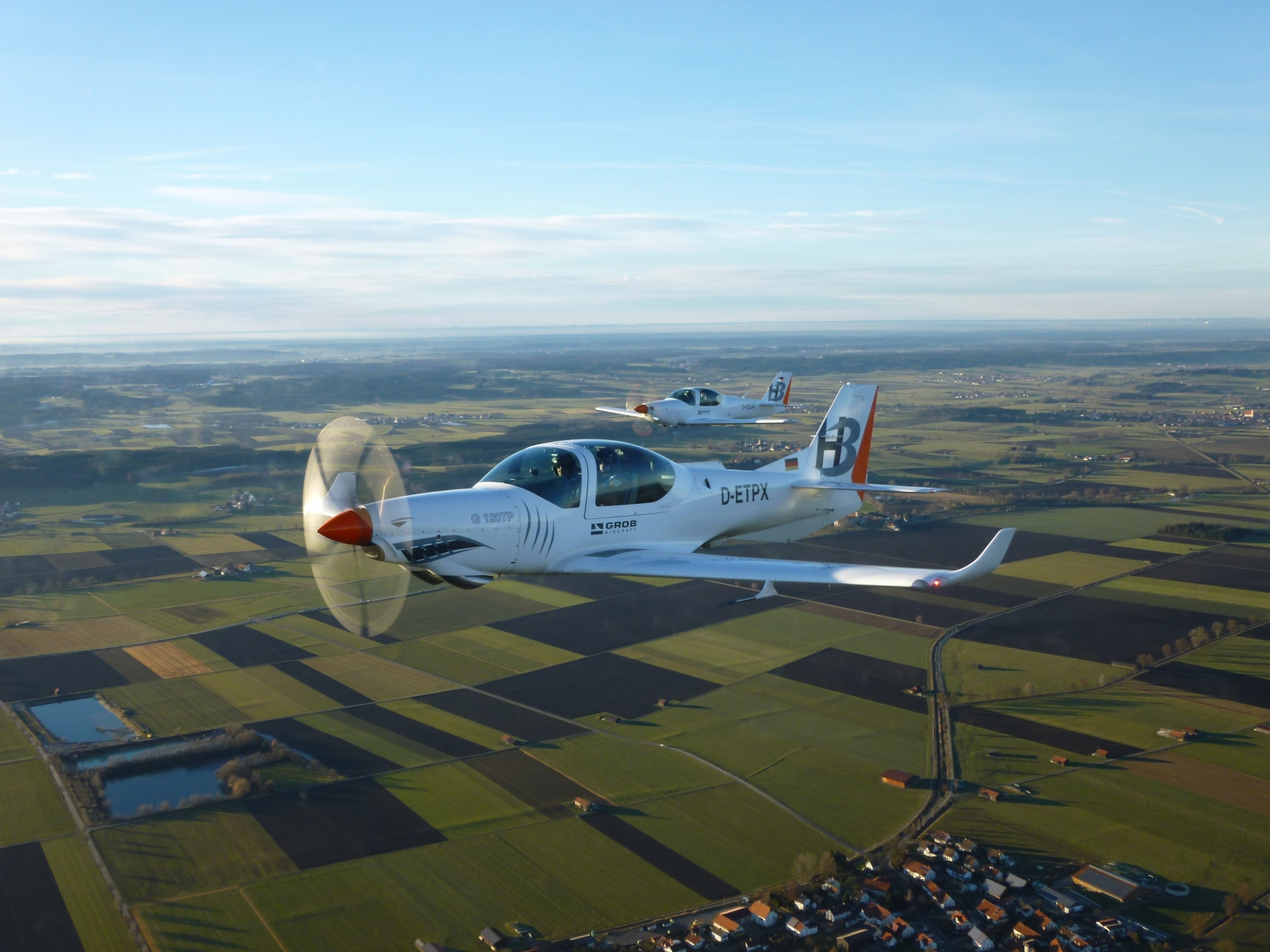
Formation flight of G 120TP (D-ETPX) and G 120A (D-ESAI)

In January 2009, it was announced that H3 Aerospace had reached an agreement to acquire the training aircraft and support business of Grob Aerospace; shortly thereafter, it was rebranded as Grob Aircraft AG. The production of training aircraft, which had been halted during November 2008 due to insolvency, was restarted during February 2009.

During 2010, Grob Aircraft introduced the G 120TP, a new single engine training aircraft, powered by a 450SHP Rolls-Royce B250F turboprop engine and equipped with a Mühlbauer MT5 (five blade) composite propeller. This aircraft was specifically designed to perform a wider range of the training syllabus than its contemporary peers, allowing more training to be performed using this single type. Since the start of serial production of the G 120TP, in excess of 100 aircraft have been delivered to seven worldwide fleet customers.

In April 2012, it was announced that Argentina's government-controlled Aircraft Factory FAdeA plans to produce 100 IA-63 Pampa II training and combat aircraft at its plant in Córdoba in association with Grob Aircraft AG. The Pampa II aircraft will have several parts for its updated version supplied by Grob.

Grob Aircraft also offers the Grob G 520 Egrett for special mission applications.

=== Grob Training Systems (GTS) ===
Grob Training Systems provides a ground-based training system (GBTS) for the G 120TP, which includes aircrew and maintenance technician training as well as training system logistics support. The system typically consists of computer-based classroom training and G 120TP Flight Training Devices.

The G 120TP Flight Training Device (FTD) features a G 120TP cockpit that is used to train basic and emergency procedures. A dome display screen is mounted to allow advanced flight maneuvers and formation flight training, in addition to basic flight training.

== Products ==
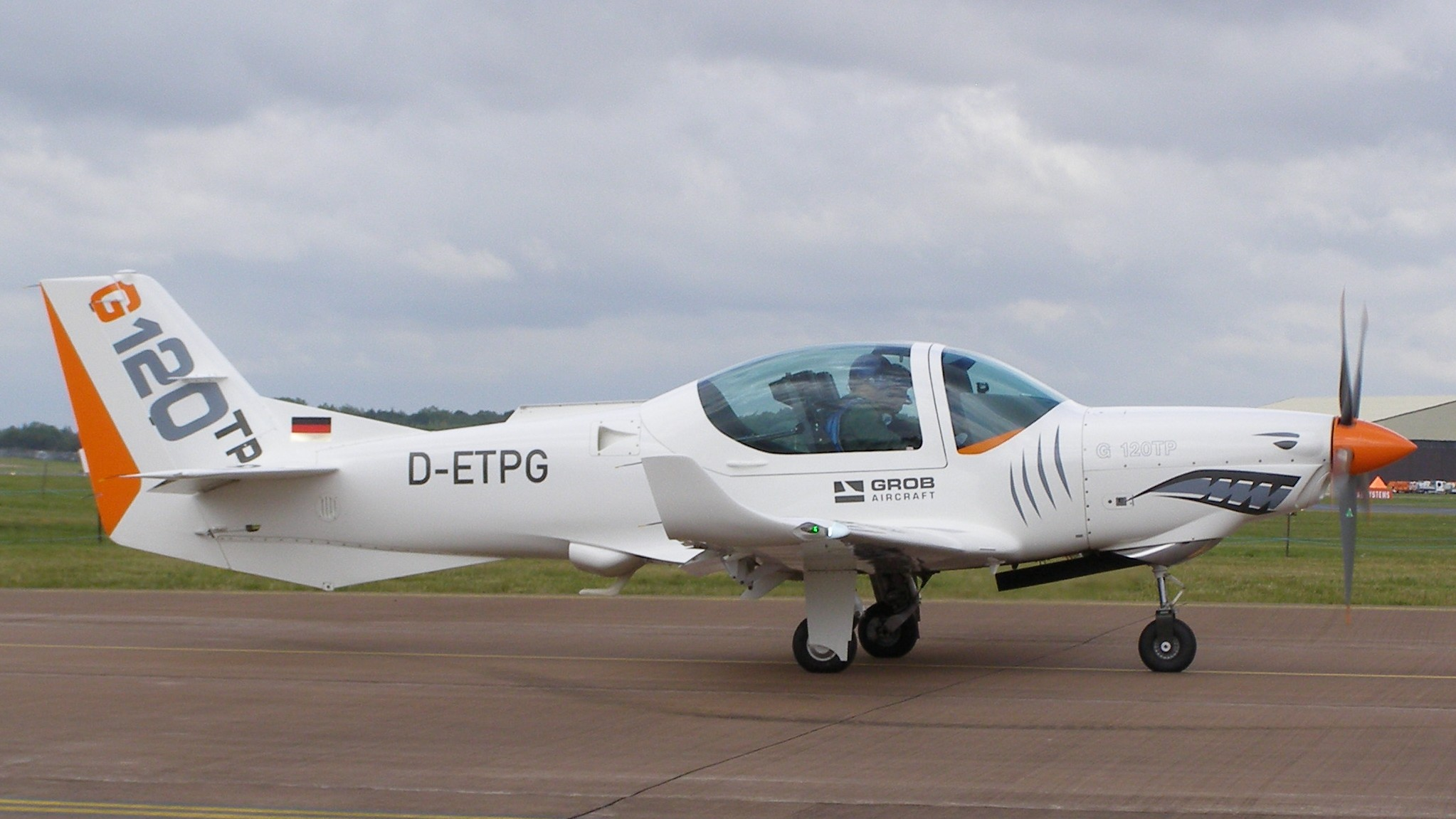
Grob Aircraft G 120TP

Produced by Grob Aircraft AG

- Grob G 115E – Trainer
- Grob G 120 – Trainer
- Grob G 120TP – Turboprop trainer
- Grob G 520 Egrett – High altitude reconnaissance and surveillance aircraft

Produced by Grob Aerospace GmbH

- Grob G 102 Astir – single-seat composite construction Standard Class sailplane
- Grob G 103 – two-seat sailplane family
  - G 103 Twin Astir
  - G 103 Twin II (also available in Acro version G 103a Twin II)
  - G 103c Twin III (also available in Acro versions)
- Grob G 104 Speed Astir – single-seat 15 metre Class sailplane
- Grob G 109 – self-launching two-seat motorglider
- Grob G 115 – Low wing all-composite two-seat aerobatic monoplane
- Grob G 116
- Grob G 120 – Trainer
- Grob G 140 four seat turboprop
- Grob G 160 six to eight seat single engine turboprop
- Grob GF 200 – Business aircraft
- Grob G 520 Egrett/STRATO 1
- Grob G180 SP^{n} business jet and variants
- Grob G 850 Strato 2c
