= Grob G103 Twin Astir =

German two-seat glider, 1976

G 103 Twin Astir
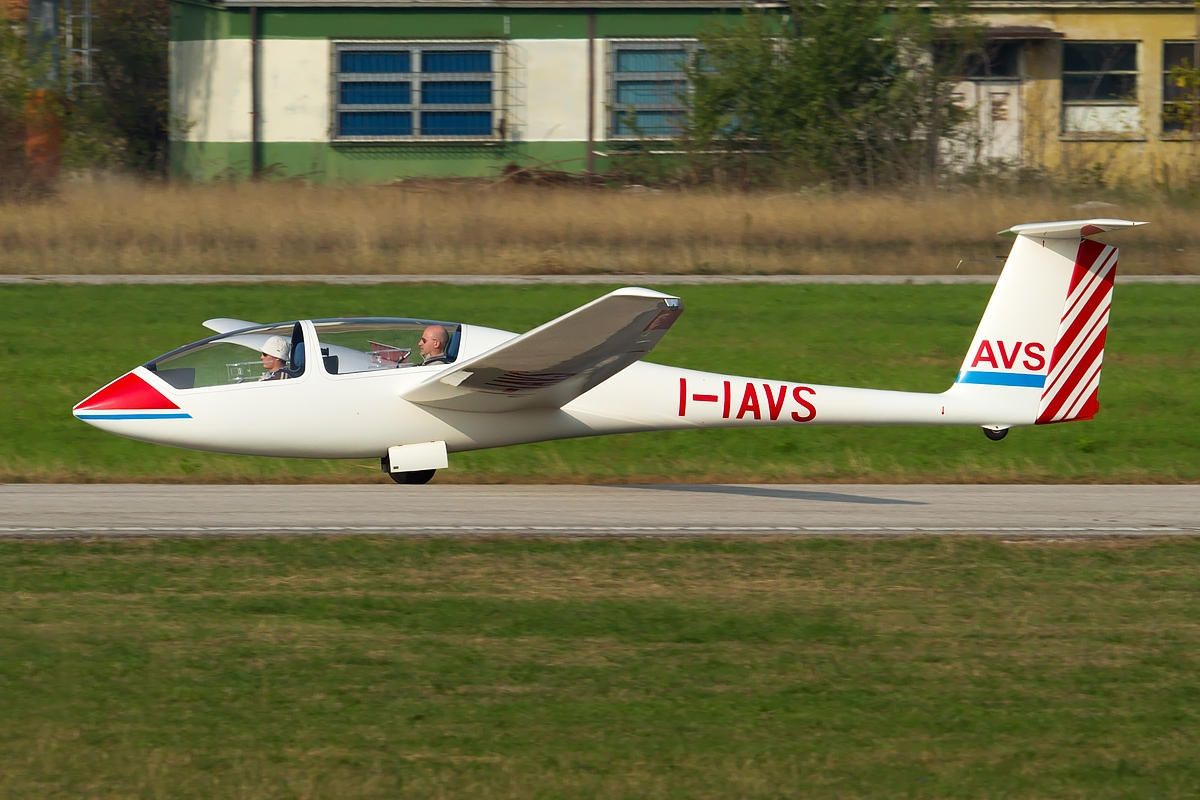
- G103 Twin Astir landing

General information
- Type: Sailplane
- National origin: Germany
- Manufacturer: Grob Aircraft
- Number built: 291

History
- First flight: 31 December 1976

The Grob G 103 Twin Astir is a glass-reinforced plastic, two-seat sailplane that was developed in Germany in the 1970s by Grob Aircraft AG as a counterpart to the single-seat G 102 Astir then in production. Construction throughout is similar, although to preserve the centre of gravity of the design, the wings were given a slight forward sweep. While many two-seat derivatives of single-seat sailplanes have fixed undercarriage, due to the added space restrictions created by the second seat, Grob devised a novel retraction system for the Twin Astir. The single wheel was designed to rotate 90° sideways before retracting "flat" under the rear seat, resulting in a rather unusual seating position. This was only incorporated in early examples; later on, the wheel was fixed. Factory options offered to customers included front seats equipped with flight instruments, and installed water ballast capacity.

Production continued until around 1980, when it was replaced in production by the Twin II, a new and not directly related design originally designated G 118, but later redesignated the G 103a. The G 103a was, in turn, replaced by the Twin III in production in 1989.

The Twin was one of the first two-seat sailplanes built from fibreglass, and it has higher glide performance than most similar sailplanes of the time (e.g. Schleicher ASK 21, Scheibe SF 34, and SZD-50 Puchacz).

== Operators ==
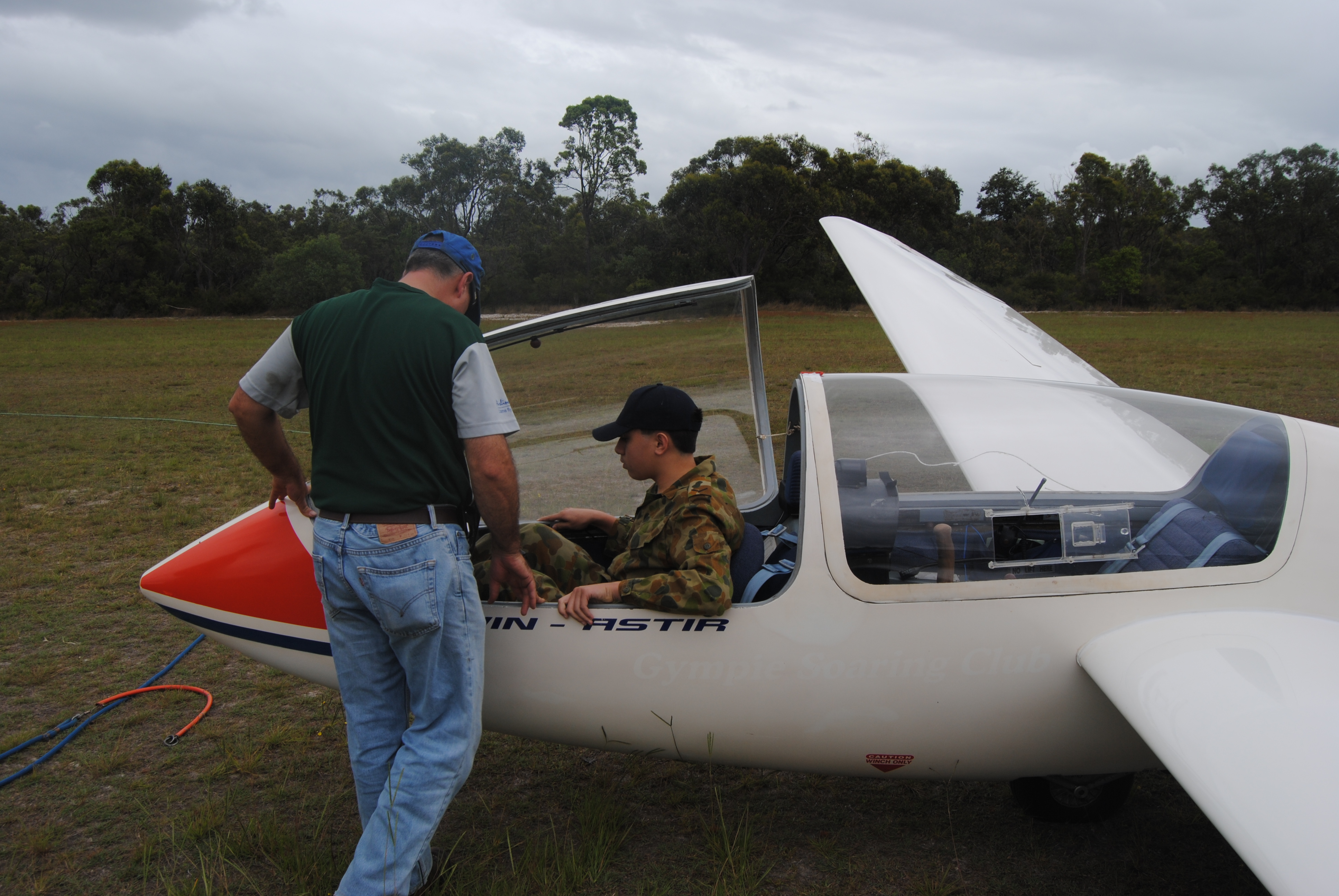
Australian Air Force cadets using the Twin Astir for gliding training, 2010

Italy

- The Italian Air Force operated 9 Grob G103 Twin Astirs from 1975 until 1999.

Australia

- Australian Air Force Cadets operated two Twin Astirs as of 2020.

United States

- The Willamette Valley Soaring Club operated a Twin Astir as of 2026.

== Specifications ==
General characteristics

- Crew: 2
- Length: 8.1 m (26 ft 7 in)
- Wingspan: 17.5 m (57 ft 5 in)
- Height: 1.60 m (5 ft 3 in)
- Wing area: 17.8 m^{2} (191.6 sq ft)
- Aspect ratio: 17.1
- Empty weight: 390 kg (860 lb)
- Gross weight: 650 kg (1,435 lb)

Performance

- Maximum speed: 250 km/h (160 mph, 135 kn)
- Maximum glide ratio: 38
- Rate of sink: 0.60 m/s (120 ft/min)

== See also ==
- Grob G103 family
- Grob G103a Twin II
- Grob G103c Twin III
