= Grob G 520 =

1991 reconnaissance aircraft series by Grob

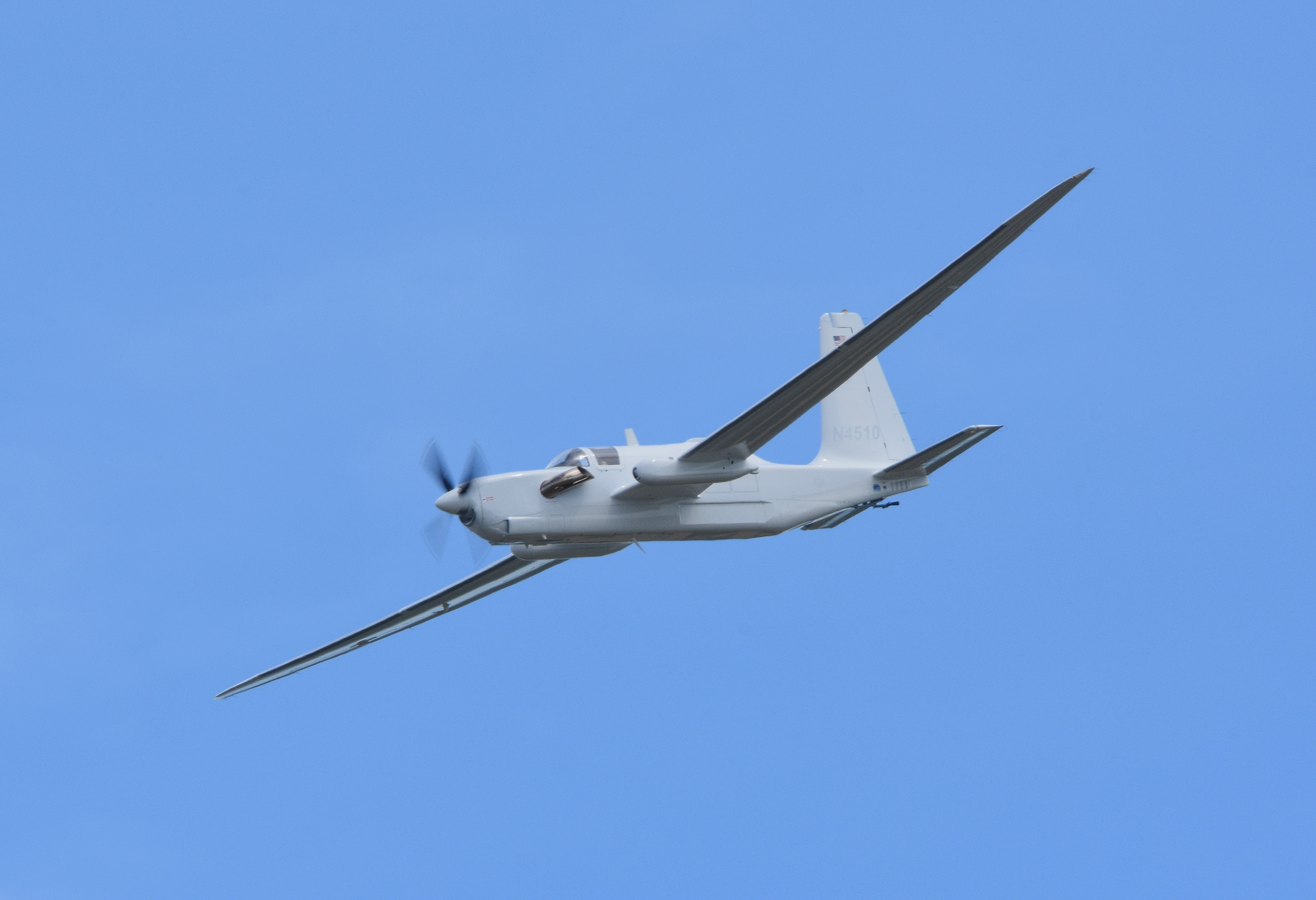
- Grob G 520T

General information
- Type: High-altitude and reconnaissance aircraft
- Manufacturer: Grob Aircraft
- Number built: 6

History
- Introduction date: 1991
- First flight: 24 June 1987

The Grob G 520 EGRETT is a turboprop-powered long-endurance, high-altitude reconnaissance and surveillance aircraft designed and produced by the German aircraft manufacturer Grob Aircraft. Since September 1988, it has been the holder of several world records relating to altitude and time to climb.

The G 520 was developed during the 1980s to fulfil a joint German Air Force – United States Air Force requirement for a high-altitude, long-duration surveillance platform. The resulting aircraft is one of the world's largest fully composite manned aircraft; it possesses full approval for all-weather IFR/icing operations according to LBA/FAA Part 23 regulations along with short runway capabilities. While designing the G 520, Grob Aircraft closely collaborated with two other companies: E-Systems and Garrett; the name ‘Egrett’ was derived from the three companies involved in its design. The D-450 EGRETT I development aircraft performed its maiden flight on 24 June 1987.

During 1991, the G 520 received certification; one year later, an order was placed by the German Air Force for production of nine EGRETT IIs, however, this was cancelled in 1993. Several single-seat aircraft, as well the sole twin-seat trainer G 520T, were completed during the early 1990s. The type has been used by various agencies, including the German Aerospace Center (DLR), to undertake scientific research and other niche high-altitude roles, including the highest known glider tow for the Windward Performance Perlan II in 2018. During the mid 2010s, Grob Aircraft announced their intention to resume quantity production of a modernised version of the aircraft, designated G 520NG; new abilities include its potential use as an optionally piloted vehicle.

== Development ==
The G. 520 originated during the 1980s as a purpose-built surveillance aircraft developed under an international partnership comprising three companies: E-Systems, Garrett, and Grob Aircraft. It was intended to fill a joint German Air Force – United States Air Force requirement for a high-altitude, long-duration surveillance platform for treaty verification and environmental monitoring. Known as "LAPAS" (Luftgestütztes, abstandsfähiges Primär-Aufklärungssystem, engl: airborne, long distance primary reconnaissance system) in Germany and "Senior Guardian" in the US, the program initially attempted to acquire the Lockheed TR-1 (U-2) for this role, but when this did not succeed, a new aircraft was sought.

Under the partnership framework, the airframe was developed by Grob, the avionics were provided by E-Systems, and the TPE 331-14F turboprop engine was supplied by Garrett. During the design phase, the programme was viewed by E-Systems as a major opportunity to increase its prominence in the international markets and grow the business, which offset the difficulties associated with the export of technologies that were considered to be highly sensitive at that time.

On 24 June 1987, the initial D-450 EGRETT I development aircraft conducted its maiden flight, piloted by Einar Enevoldson. Considerable emphasis was placed on demonstrating the aircraft’s high altitude capabilities. According, during September 1988, the D-450 established three separate world records related to altitude and time to climb; specifically:

- Time to climb to 15,000 metres (49,213 ft): 40 minutes 47 seconds
- Altitude in horizontal flight: 16,239 metres (53,278 ft)
- Altitude without payload: 16,329 metres (53,573 ft)

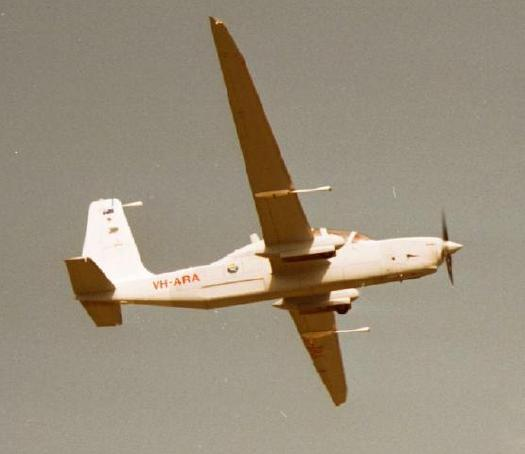
G 520 during a test flight, 1991

During 1989 and 1990, a pair of pre-production aircraft, referred to as the D-500 EGRETT II, were completed. On 13 September 1991, the aircraft received airworthiness certification. That same year, the two pre-production aircraft were fitted out to the finalized G 520 configuration; owned by E-Systems and Grob respectively, both aircraft were typically used for promotional purposes. While E-Systems' aircraft was focused on demonstrating its various sensor packages, Grob's aircraft (renamed the Strato 1) was commonly used to market the aircraft towards civil authorities as a resource management platform.

In 1992, the German Air Force placed an order for production of nine EGRETT IIs; these were intended to be supplemented by at least one G 520T twin seat trainer and one of the demonstrator aircraft. The estimated value of this contact was between $600 million and $1 billion.

However, during February 1993, before much of the manufacturing work had taken place, the procurement process came under intense scrutiny when accusations of corruption (Amigo Affair) surrounding the former Bavarian Minister President Max Streibl became public. A further factor was the end of the Cold War and the subsequent defence budget reductions that impacted the German Air Force. The program was formally cancelled as the threat from Eastern Europe was perceived to be no longer present. A total of five single-seat aircraft had been completed by the time of the termination. During 1993, E-Systems decided to pull out of the G 520 programme entirely.

In the early 1990s, a single twin-seat trainer G 520T was completed by Grob and was initially acquired to the German Aerospace Center (DLR). During 1997, the DLR sold it on to Airborne Research Australia in Adelaide, which performed numerous scientific programmes using the aircraft. The G 520T was grounded in 2007 due to a lack of funds and was repurchased by Grob Aircraft during 2013, after which it was upgraded, returned to flightworthy condition, and flown back to Germany. Following repainting, it was presented to the public during the 2014 Farnborough Airshow as part of the firm’s promotion of its plans to resume production of the G 520.

During the late 2010s, the sole G 520T has been upgraded with many of the innovations intended for the new generation G 520NG. These include the adoption of a Pratt & Whitney PT-6, a total-authority autopilot, and other fittings to turn it into an optionally piloted vehicle that can be flown remotely from a ground station. The prospective G 520NG has been promoted as being a more affordable alternative to unmanned surveillance and reconnaissance aerial vehicles such as the Northrop Grumman RQ-4 Global Hawk as well as the aircraft not falling under International Traffic in Arms Regulations (ITAR) restrictions.

During the latter half of 2018, a G 520 was outfitted with a new towing system and used to perform the highest altitude glider tow in history while conveying the Windward Performance Perlan II (a pressurised space capsule intended to fly by riding stratrospheric mountain waves to heights of up to 90,000ft) to altitude.

== Design ==
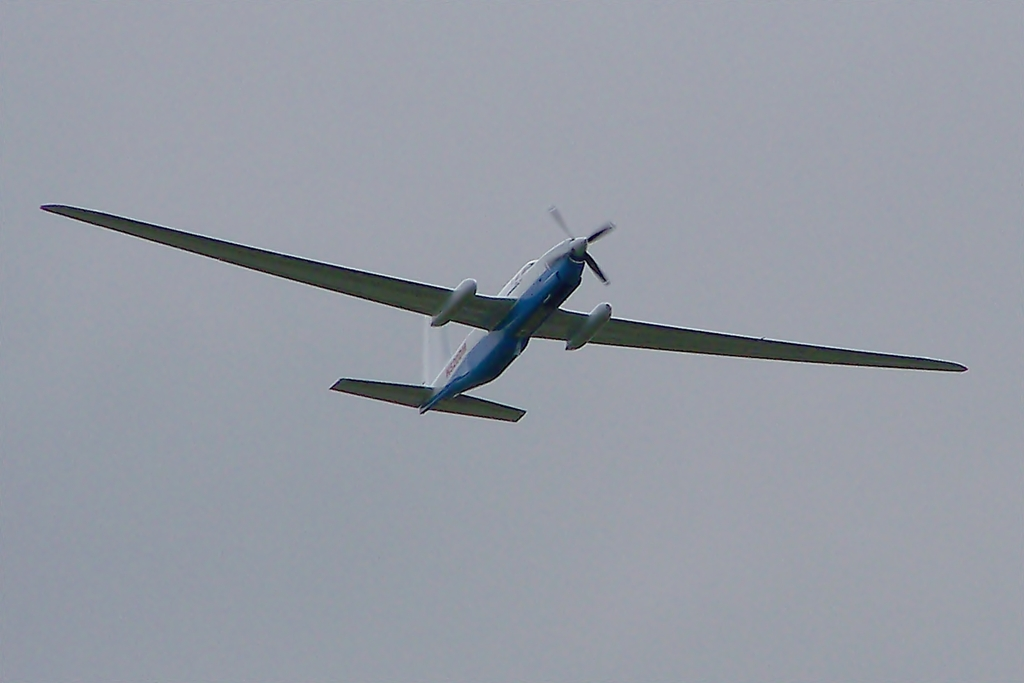
inflight, showing the high wing aspect ratio

The G 520 is a fully composite conventional mid-wing monoplane with extremely high aspect ratio wings. These wings flex considerably during flight, especially when encountering turbulence. It was the first composite aircraft specifically designed for stratospheric research.

Power is typically provided by a single turboprop Honeywell TPE 331-14F that drives a four-blade Hartzell propeller. This engine is fitted with large exhaust mufflers that are intended to reduce both the acoustic and infrared signatures produced. It is equipped with a tricycle undercarriage, whose main units retract into fairings on the wings. Differential braking is used to control the aircraft while taxiing, except on the twin-seat G 520T, which can be steered using the nose wheel instead. Up to 100kg of ballast can be installed within the tail unit to offset balance and weight issues posed by the payloads that can be carried.

The slender fuselage of the G 520 is modular, the whole lower section not forming a part of the aircraft’s structure. This approach is uncommon and made the aircraft easily adaptable to suit a wide variety of surveillance missions. In the center of the lower fuselage is a flexible payload compartment (sometimes referred to as Bay 13) that was entirely detachable, allowing preconfigured payloads to be rapidly interchanged. The G 520 can accommodate multiple mission systems for both civilian and military applications, a total of 12 payload compartments for the carriage of up to 850 kg of mission equipment are provisioned. These compartments can be adapted to accept various customer-specified payloads, including electro-optical sensors, LIDAR, sigint, and scientific packages. When functioning as a maritime patrol aircraft, it can be furnished with a suitable radar, or be used as a satellite relay system to bolster ground communications via satcom apparatus. An optional radome can be present on the underside of the fuselage.

The cockpit of the G 520T provides room for a pilot and a sensor operator as well as for equipment which has to be placed inside the pressurized cabin. The instrument panel can be optionally equipped with a digital glass cockpit IDU-680 EFIS by Genesys Aerosystems. An optional operator console can be installed in the rear cockpit of twin seat aircraft; these furnishing include a full keyboard, hand controller units, and a camera grip. The rear cockpit can also be configured for training duties. Refit aircraft are commonly equipped with a dual-GPS system and have been outfitted for all-weather operations.

== Variants ==
D-450 EGRETT I
Initial prototype. One built.
D-500 EGRETT II
Pre-production aircraft. Two built.
G 520
Original single-seat production standard aircraft. Five built.
G 520T
Twin-seat version of the G 520. One built.
G 520NG
Modernised version of the G 520T. Production of the type was envisioned to commence during the 2010s.

== Operators ==
Australia
Airborne Research Australia
Germany
German Aerospace Center (DLR)
United StatesArgentina
Perlan Project High altitude glider towing

== Specifications ==
Data from Grob

General characteristics

- Crew: one
- Capacity: one passenger / 850 kg (1,870 lb) payload
- Length: 13.82 m (45 ft 4 in)
- Wingspan: 33.0 m (108 ft 3 in)
- Height: 5.66 m (18 ft 7 in)
- Wing area: 39.67 m^{2} (427.0 sq ft)
- Empty weight: 3,300 kg (7,275 lb)
- Max takeoff weight: 4,700 kg (10,362 lb)
- Fuel capacity: 1,070 kg (2,360 lb)
- Powerplant: 1 × Honeywell TPE331-14F Turboprop aircraft engine, 560 kW (750 hp)
- Propellers: 4-bladed Hartzell, 3.04 m (10 ft 0 in) diameter constant-speed propeller

Performance

- Maximum speed: 469 km/h (291 mph, 253 kn) maximum operating weight, MSL
- Cruise speed: 283 km/h (176 mph, 153 kn) at 11,000 m (35,000 ft) ISA, MTOW
- Stall speed: 107 km/h (67 mph, 58 kn) (MLW, landing configuration)
- Range: 3,670 km (2,280 mi, 1,980 nmi) at 15,000 m (50,000 ft) ISA, MTOW, 45 minutes of reserve fuel, 500 kg (1,100 lb) payload
- Endurance: 7.5 hours at 15,000 m (50,000 ft) ISA, MTOW, 45 minutes of reserve fuel, 500 kg (1,100 lb) payload
- Service ceiling: 15,240 m (50,000 ft) (max. certified operating altitude)
- Rate of climb: 7.3 m/s (1,440 ft/min)
- Time to altitude: 50 minutes to 14,000 m (45,000 ft)
- Take off distance over 15 m (50 ft): 670 m (2,200 ft) (MSL, ISA, MTOW, no wind, no slope)
- Landing distance over 15 m (50 ft): 685 m (2,247 ft) (MSL, ISA, MTOW, no wind, no slope)
