= Grob G103a Twin II =

German two-seat glider

G103A Twin II
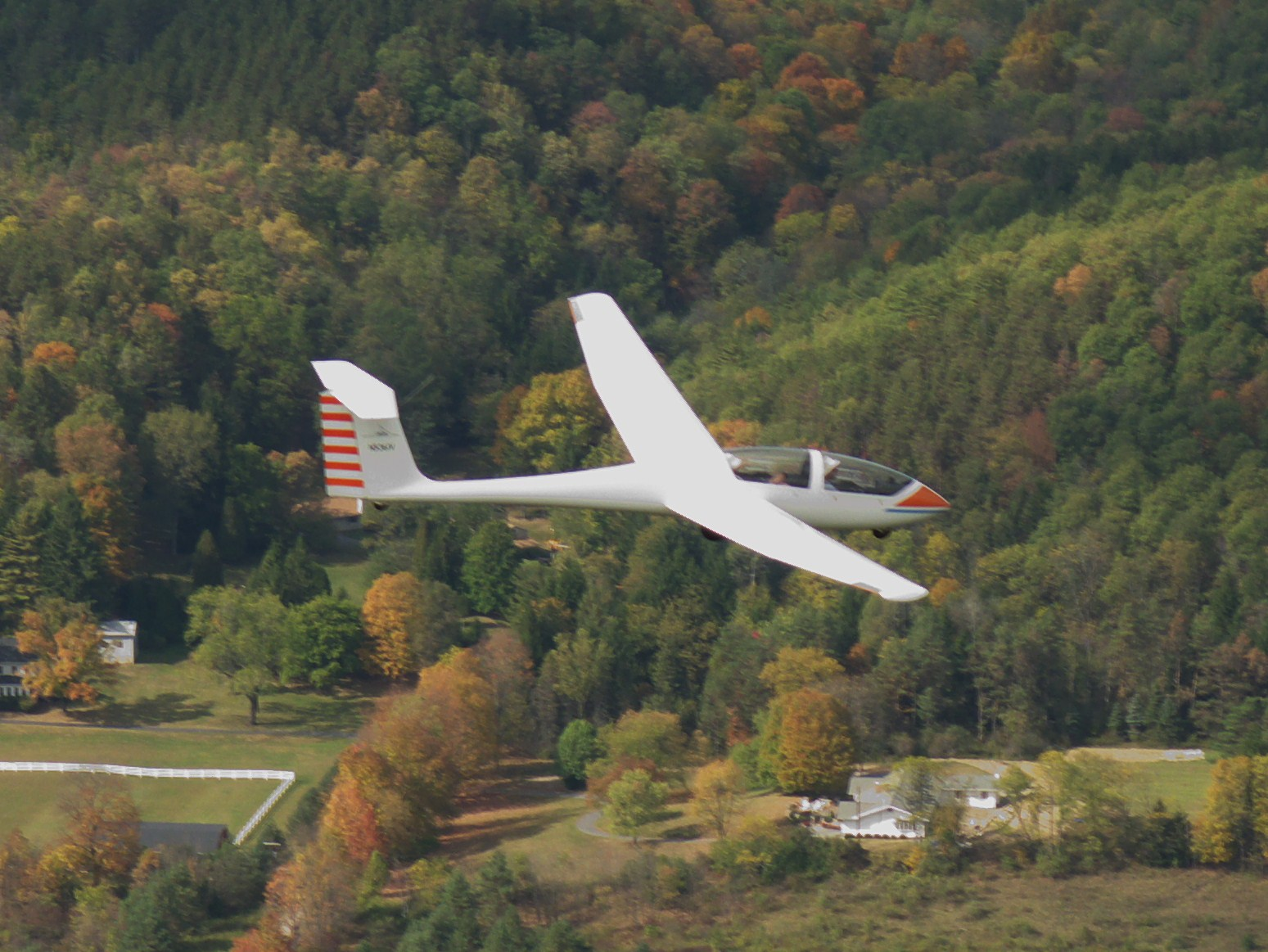

General information
- Type: Two-Seater Class sailplane
- National origin: Germany
- Manufacturer: Grob Aircraft
- Number built: 549

The G103 Twin II (originally designated the G 118) is a high-performance two-seat sailplane manufactured in Germany by Grob Aircraft. The aircraft is of T-tail configuration, and is fitted with upper-surface airbrakes and a non-retractable undercarriage. Of fiberglass construction, it is designed for training, high performance cross-country racing and simple aerobatic flying.

== Design and development ==
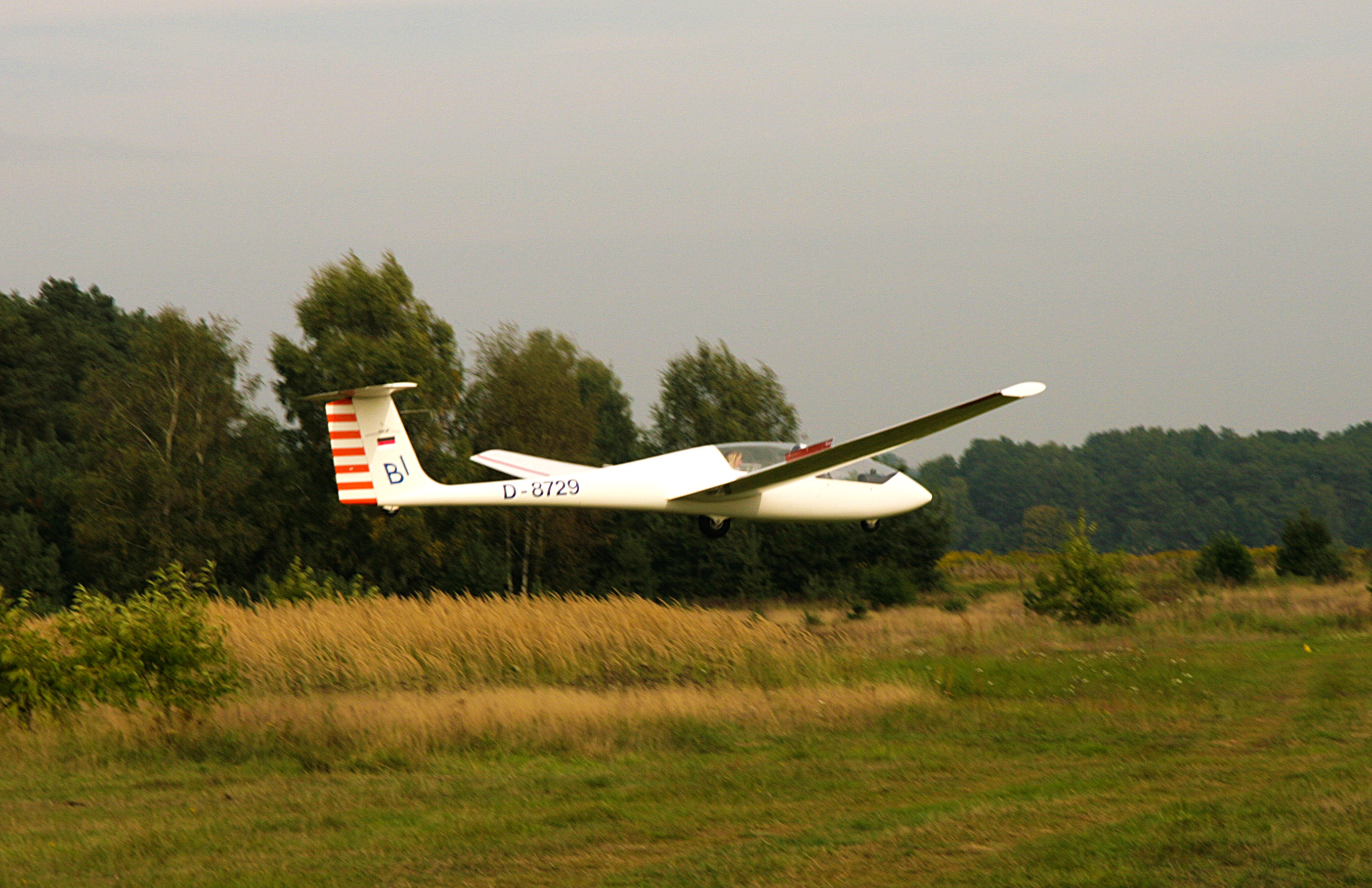
Grob G103 Twin II landing. Clear view of the new three-wheel undercarriage configuration.

The G103 Twin II (a.k.a. the Twin Astir II) is the successor of the original G103 Twin Astir with a nose wheel and a fixed six-inch main gear fitted behind the center of gravity - The main wheel is equipped with a hydraulic brake. Modified ailerons produce a substantially improved roll response compared to the previous model. Approach control is by top surface Schempp-Hirth type airbrakes. The G103A Twin II Acro variant features strengthened mainspar caps and steel control pushrods which permit greater aerobatic performance. The G103 also has a FAA approved modification kit for all-hand control for handicapped operation.

The Royal Air Force Air Cadets acquired 100 Twin II Acros (known in service as the Grob Viking T1) in 1984/85 to replace the aging Slingsby gliders of the RAF Volunteer Gliding Schools.

A total of 549 were produced before it was succeeded in production by the G103C Twin III in 1989.

== Operational history ==
=== Records ===
On 28 September 1981 the Twin II took the world Out & Return record for two-seat sailplanes (1000.88 km/ 621.92 miles). The aircraft (N424GL) was flown out of the Ridge Soaring Gliderport, Pennsylvania, USA, by pilot Thomas Knauff and crew, Rob Gannon.

On May 14, 1996 the Twin II G103A took the Pennsylvania State Open Multi place class; Distance around a Triangular Course/Speed over a Triangular Course of 100 km; Pilot David F. Bradley, Sr. Passenger Jim Vincent. and the Pennsylvania Sports Class; Distance around a Triangular Course of 100 km; Pilot David Bradley, Passenger Jim Vincent.

=== In-flight limitations ===
In 2003 Service Bulletin 315-64/2 reduced the maximum admissible airspeeds and prohibited aerobatic flight. This was due to reports that the design of the fuselage may not have been sufficient to sustain limit loads during certain maneuvers and during flight at certain speeds. Grob completed further investigations into the effects of certain flight conditions on the fuselage structure and the development of corrective procedures. Further static strength tests were conducted to verify the safety margin of the fuselage. The results of these tests restored the original flight speed limitations and maneuver operations for the Twin II and allowed the Twin II Acro only basic aerobatic maneuvers (spins, lazy eights, chandelles, stall turns, steep turns, and positive loops). An approved modification, when incorporated, restores full acrobatic status to these sailplanes.

== Operators ==
Argentina

- Argentinian Air Force

Australia

- Australian Air Force Cadets

Belgium

- Belgian Air Component for Royal Belgian Air Cadets

Italy

- Italian Air Force Gliding Centre

United Kingdom

- Royal Air Force

Royal Air Force Gliding and Soaring Association

United States

- Civil Air Patrol

== Specifications ==
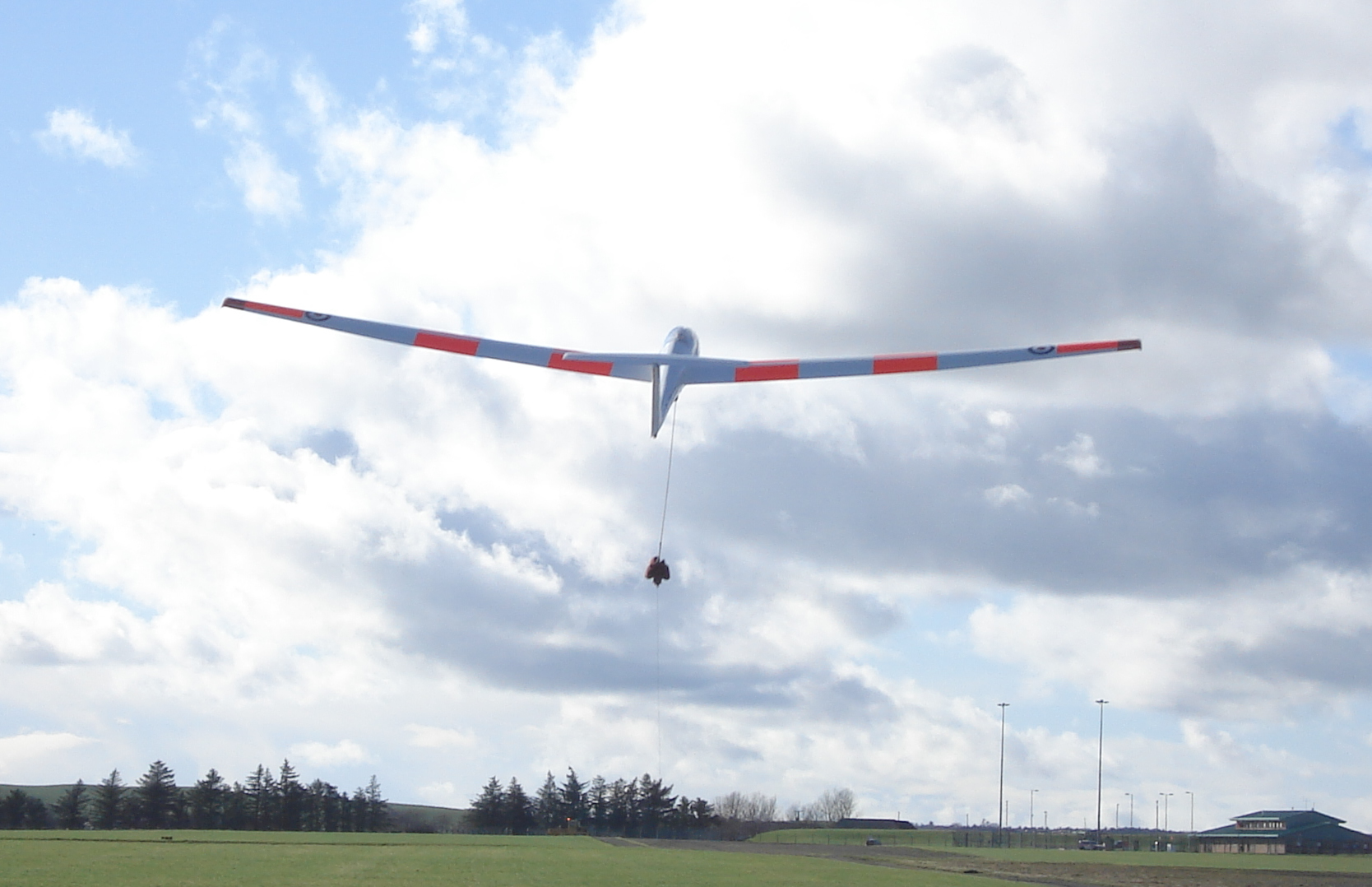
Viking T1 used by the British Air Cadet Organisation launching at 662 VGS, RM Condor

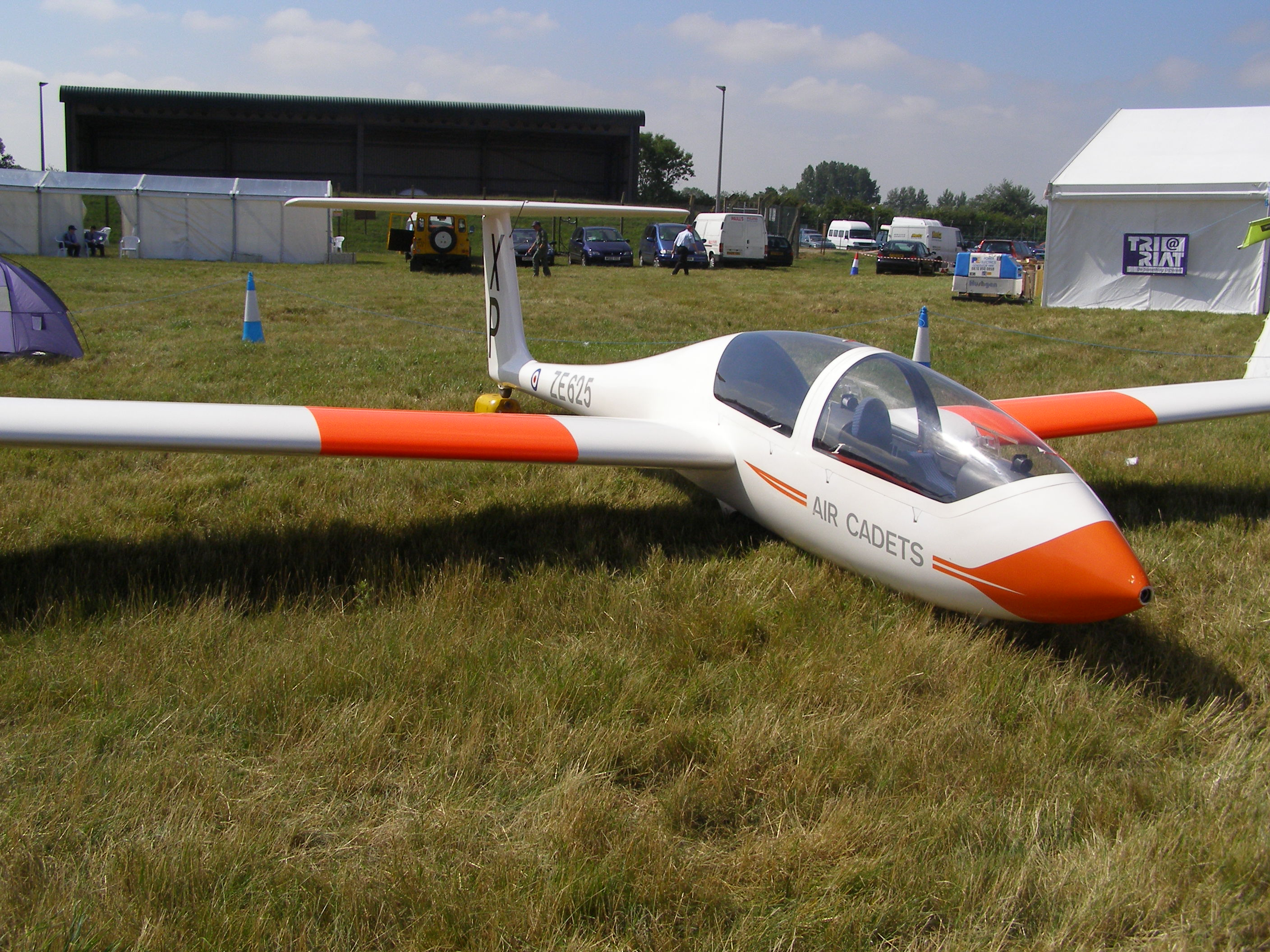
Royal Air Force/Air Cadets Viking T1

General characteristics

- Crew: Two
- Length: 8.18 m (26 ft 10 in)
- Wingspan: 17.50 m (57 ft 5 in)
- Height: 1.55 m (5 ft 1 in)
- Wing area: 17.8 m^{2} (191 sq ft)
- Aspect ratio: 17.1
- Empty weight: 380 kg (837 lb)
- Gross weight: 580 kg (1,280 lb)

Performance

- Maximum speed: 250 km/h (160 mph, 140 kn)
- Cruise speed: 85 km/h (62 mph, 54 kn)
- g limits: +5.3/-2.65 at Va
- Maximum glide ratio: ca. 36.5
- Rate of sink: 0.64 m/s (126 ft/min)
- Wing loading: 32.6 kg/m^{2} (6.68 lb/sq ft)

== See also ==
- Grob G103 family
- Grob G103 Twin Astir
- Grob G103c Twin III

Related lists

- List of gliders
