= Grigorovich (design bureau) =

Grigorovich was a Soviet aircraft design bureau, headed by Dmitry Pavlovich Grigorovich.

== Aircraft ==
=== Reconnaissance ===
- M-1 - experimental observation flying boat, 1913
- M-2 - biplane flying boat, 1914
- M-3 - biplane flying boat, developed from the M-2, 1914
- M-4 - biplane flying boat, developed from the M-3
- M-5 - reconnaissance biplane flying boat, 1914
- M-6 - biplane flying boat
- M-7 - biplane flying boat
- M-8 - biplane flying boat
- M-9 - biplane reconnaissance flying boat with machine gun, 1915, with cannon, 1916
- M-10 - flying boat, 1915
- MK-1 - three-engine biplane reconnaissance-bomber seaplane, 1916
- M-15 - biplane reconnaissance flying boat; scaled-down M-9, 1916
- M-16 - biplane reconnaissance flying boat for winter conditions; developed from the M-9, 1916
- M-17 - flying boat; re-engined M-15
- M-18 - flying boat; re-engined M-15, never finished
- M-19 - flying boat; scaled-down M-9, never finished; 1918
- M-20 - flying boat; refined M-5, 1916
- M-22 - reconnaissance flying boat (project) - 1922
- M-23bis - biplane flying boat developed from the M-9, 1923
- M-24 - biplane reconnaissance flying boat, 1923
- MRL-1 - long-range reconnaissance flying boat, 1925
- MR-2 - long-range reconnaissance flying boat, 1926
- MR-5 - long-range reconnaissance flying boat, 1929
- ROM-1 - long-range reconnaissance flying boat, 1927
- ROM-2/MR-3/MDR-1 - long-range reconnaissance flying boat, 1929

=== Fighter ===
- M-11 - biplane flying boat-fighter, 1916
- M-12 - improved M-11, 1916
- M-13 - naval fighter project, 1916
- M-14 - naval fighter project, 1916
- PI-1 (Pushechny Istrebitel, the first one) - fighter with cannons and retractable gear, 1930..1933, developed from the I-Z
- I-1 - fighter, 1924; first land-based design
- I-2 - fighter developed from the I-1, 1924; first Soviet fighter to enter service in large numbers
- I-Z - single-seat fighter, 1931
- I-9 - twin-engine single-seat heavy fighter project, 1932
- I-10 - single-seat high-speed fighter project, 1933
- IP-1 (DG-52) - cannon fighter, 1934
- IP-2 (DG-54) - re-engined IP-1, never finished
- IP-4 (DG-53) - downsized version of IP-1, 1934

=== Escort fighter ===
- LK-3 (DG-56) - twin-engine escort fighter project, 1936

=== Torpedo bomber ===
- GASN (Gydro-Aeroplane Spetsialnogo Naznacheniya, "special purpose hydroplane") - biplane torpedo bomber, 1917; world's first torpedo-bomber aircraft

=== Bomber ===
- TB-5 - heavy bomber prototype, 1931
- DG-57 - medium bomber project, 1936

=== Dive bomber ===
- PB-1 (DG-58) - monoplane dive bomber project, 1935

=== Trainer ===
- MUR-1 - flying boat trainer developed from the M-5/M-20, 1926
- MU-2 - flying boat trainer, 1928
- MUR-2 - flying boat laboratory for aerodynamic testing

=== Ground attack ===
- TSh-1 - ground attack biplane, 1931
- TSh-2 - ground attack biplane, 1931

=== Minelayer ===
- MM-1 - minelaying twin-engine seaplane project, 1927
- MM-2 - minelaying twin-engine biplane seaplane project
- MM-3 (later known as MT-1)

=== Passenger aircraft ===
- SUVP (also known as PL-1) - airliner, 1925

=== Sport aircraft ===
- E-2 (DG-55) - prototype twin-engine sport aircraft, 1935

For Polikarpov

- I-5 fighter (in cooperation with N.N.Polikarpov), 1930
- DI-3, two-seat escort fighter developed from the Polikarpov DI-2, 1931
