= Grigorovich IP-1 =

IP-1, IP-4
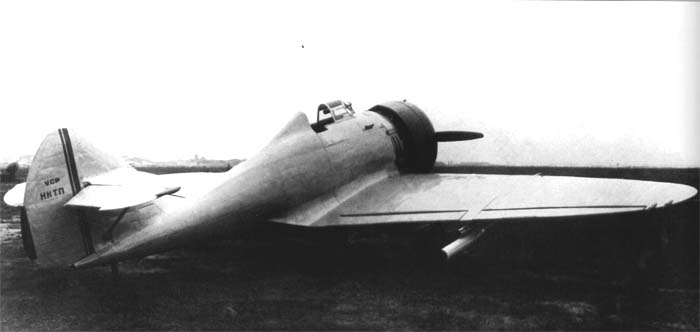

General information
- Type: Fighter
- National origin: Soviet Union
- Manufacturer: Grigorovich, GAS № 135
- Designer: Dmitry Grigorovich (engineer)
- Primary user: Soviet Air Force
- Number built: ca. 90

History
- Introduction date: 1936
- First flight: 1935
- Retired: 1940

The Grigorovich IP-1 (for Истребитель Пушечный - "Cannon fighter") was a fighter aircraft produced in the Soviet Union in the 1930s by the Grigorovich Design Bureau.

The IP-1 started development as the GD-52 in 1934. An all-metal aircraft, it featured an open cockpit, retractable wing wheels, an advanced, nearly-elliptical cantilever wing, and a variable-pitch, metal propeller powered by a 640 hp (477 kW) Wright Cyclone series engine. Retractable skis could be fitted for winter use, a first for any Soviet aircraft. The DG-52 was transferred to the Air Force Research Institute on 12 January, 1935 for testing, and was flown that same day by P.Ya. Fedrovi.

Like the preceding Grigorovich I-Z, the IP-1 prototype was built around the cannon-fighter concept, with two Leonid Kurchevsky-designed APK-4 76.2mm cannons mounted under the wings, each capable of 5 shots before ammunition was depleted. It was also armed with two 7.62mm machine guns. Production aircraft used the licensed copy of the Wright Cyclone, the Shvetsov M-25. After 90 aircraft had been produced and 30 delivered, it became apparent that there were issues with lateral stability and especially spin. On 3 June, 1936 Lieutenant Bolshakov of the 92nd Air Brigade fell into a flat tailspin at 1,700m, and had to bail out with a parachute. This led to further refinements to the structure. On 3 May 1936 it was decided to replace the APK-4 cannons with two 20mm ShVAK cannons. Six 7.62mm ShKAS machine guns were installed, three in each wing. 200 units were produced from 1936 to 1937, but the IP-1 was soon overshadowed by the Polikarpov I-16.

On 1 February, 1940 six IP-1s were in service at the ShMAS Air Force in the Moscow Military District, and eight at the Air Force Control Center, though the latter had been dismantled for use as spare parts. In October 1940 the 21 remaining aircraft were written off as unusable.

== Variants ==
In 1939 it was proposed to utilize the IP-1 as an attack aircraft rather than a fighter. IP-1 number 135 was armed with Six ShKAS machine guns, and 6-6.5mm armor was added to the gas tanks, cockpit, and engine. Seven more aircraft were also converted to the new attack configuration, and these were designated IP-1sh. Flight tests were carried out on 5 & 6 June, 1939, where it was determined that the tendency to spin was too great and the project was abandoned. One IP-1sh was sent to NKSP Research Institute 48 to be used as a target for determining armor effectiveness.

An IP-1 fitted with a 690 hp (514 kW) Hispano-Suiza 12Xbrs engine was given the designation IP-2 (DG-54). Armed with an engine-mounted ShVAK cannon and 10 ShKAS machine guns, the prototype was nearly complete when abandoned in 1936.

The IP-4 (DG-53) fighter was designed in 1934. Armament consisted of four 45mm Kurchevsy APK cannons and two machine guns. A second prototype (DG-52bis) with ShVAK cannon replacing the Kurchevsy weapons was designed but never built.

The armament of the IP-4 consisted of four fixed dynamo-reactive 45-mm L.V. guns. Kurchevsky ARK-11 and two rifle-caliber machine guns. Like the IP-1 prototype, the IP-4 fighter prototype was equipped with a Cyclone engine. A second prototype with two ShVAK guns instead of the Kurchevsky guns was designed, but not built.

== Operators ==
Soviet Union

- Soviet Air Force

== Specifications (IP-1) ==
General characteristics

- Crew: One pilot
- Length: 7.23 m (23 ft 9 in)
- Wingspan: 10.97 m (36 ft 0 in)
- Wing area: 20.0 m^{2} (215 sq ft)
- Empty weight: 1,200 kg (2,646 lb)
- Gross weight: 1,880 kg (4,145 lb)
- Powerplant: 1 × Shvetsov M-25 , 530 kW (710 hp)

Performance

- Maximum speed: 410 km/h (255 mph, 222 kn)
- Range: 600 km (373 mi, 324 nmi)
- Service ceiling: 8,300 m (27,230 ft)
- Rate of climb: 12.8 m/s (2,520 ft/min)

Armament

- 2 × fixed, forward-firing 7.62 mm ShKAS machine guns in forward fuselage
- 2 × fixed, forward-firing 20 mm ShVAK cannons in wing roots
- 6 × fixed, forward-firing 7.62 mm ShKAS machine guns in trays under wings
