= Grigorovich I-1 =

General information
- Type: Fighter
- National origin: Soviet Union
- Manufacturer: Grigorovich Design Bureau
- Designer: Dmitry Pavlovich Grigorovich
- Status: Prototype
- Number built: 1

History
- First flight: January 1924
- Variant: Grigorovich I-2

The Grigorovich I-1 was a Soviet fighter prototype of the 1920s. It was the first land-based fighter developed by the Grigorovich Design Bureau, who had previously concentrated on water-borne aircraft such as the Grigorovich M-5 of 1914.

== Development ==
Initially, design was started on a single-seat fighter by Dmitry Pavlovich Grigorovich, to compete with the Polikarpov I-1 biplane. The finished aircraft, finalised in 1924 and produced at Factory No. 1, at Khodinka, near Moscow, was a single-seat, single-bay biplane of wooden construction, with the forward portion of the fuselage being covered in plywood and the rear having fabric skinning. In development, a major problem was that of engine cooling - various methods were tested including radiators attached to the undercarriage legs, but in the end a radiator suspended beneath the engine was used.

== Operational history ==
After an initial flight in January 1924, testing took place in the spring of that year. The I-1 was found to have adequate speed for its purpose but its construction and therefore its flight were unstable, and its climb rate was found to be insufficient with repeated stalls. Therefore, the prototype was abandoned, and Grigorovich refined the design into the Grigorovich I-2 which later entered service in the Soviet Air Force.

== Variants ==
Grigorovich I-2
Aerodynamically more refined version of the I-1, entered service in 1926.

== Specifications (I-1) ==
Data from The Complete Book of Fighters

General characteristics

- Crew: one
- Length: 7.32 m (24 ft 0 in)
- Wingspan: 10.8 m (35 ft 5 in)
- Wing area: 26.8 m^{2} (288 sq ft)
- Airfoil: Göttingen 436
- Powerplant: 1 × Liberty L-12 V-12 water-cooled piston engine, 300 kW (400 hp)
- Propellers: 2-bladed wooden fixed-pitch propeller

Performance

- Maximum speed: 230 km/h (140 mph, 120 kn)
- Range: 600 km (370 mi, 320 nmi)
- Service ceiling: 6,000 m (20,000 ft)

Armament

- Guns: 2 x 7.7mm Vickers machine-guns

== See also ==
Related development

- Polikarpov I-1

Aircraft of comparable role, configuration, and era

- Grigorovich I-2
