= Grigorovich MR-5 =

1920s Soviet reconnaissance flying boat

MR-5

General information
- Type: Reconnaissance flying boat
- Designer: Dmitry Pavlovich Grigorovich
- Primary user: Soviet Navy
- Number built: 1

History
- First flight: July 1929
- Developed from: Grigorovich MR-2

The Grigorovich MR-5 was a long-range reconnaissance flying boat designed by the Grigorovich Design Bureau for the Soviet Navy in the late 1920s.

== Design ==
The MR-5 was similar to the MR-2 in layout, armament, and payload, but had a more powerful BMV VI engine and an all-metal hull. Flight tests were conducted in Taganrog beginning in July 1929, and although the aircraft behaved well in the air, takeoff was sluggish.

== Specifications ==
Data from

General characteristics

- Crew: 2
- Length: 11.4 m (37 ft 5 in)
- Wingspan: 15.6 m (51 ft 2 in)
- Wing area: 53.0 m^{2} (570 sq ft)
- Empty weight: 2,027 kg (4,469 lb)
- Max takeoff weight: 3,082 kg (6,795 lb)
- Powerplant: 2 × BMV VI V-cylinder inline engine, 372 kW (499 hp) each

Performance

- Maximum speed: 235 km/h (146 mph, 127 kn)
- Endurance: 4 hours
- Service ceiling: 4,000 m (13,000 ft)
- Time to altitude: 1,000 m (3,281 ft) in 7.0 minutes
- Wing loading: 58.2 kg/m^{2} (11.9 lb/sq ft)

Armament

- Guns: 1-2 x machine guns

== Bibliography ==
- Lawrence, Joseph (1945). The Observer's Book Of Airplanes. London and New York: Frederick Warne & Co.
