= Grigorovich M-23bis =

General information
- Type: Biplane flying boat
- National origin: USSR
- Manufacturer: Grigorovich Design Bureau
- Designer: Dmitri Grigorovich
- Primary user: Soviet Naval Aviation
- Number built: 1

History
- First flight: Failed to fly
- Developed from: Grigorovich M-9

The Grigorovich M-23bis was a Soviet biplane flying boat built during the 1920s.

== Design ==
Dmitri Grigorovich developed the M-23 as a derivative of the Grigorovich M-9 with a more powerful engine. The first M-23 design was abandoned after the Russian Revolution and was transformed into an improved design, the M-23bis, in 1922. The aircraft was completed at GAZ-3 "Krasnyj Letchik" (The Red Pilot) in mid-Summer 1923, but the unsuccessful hull shape meant that it failed to take off. The M-23bis was sent back for modifications, but in late 1923, was destroyed by a flood at the Krestovsky Island hangar.

== Specifications (M-23bis) ==
Data from Aircraft of the Soviet Union : the encyclopaedia of Soviet aircraft since 1917, Russian Aviation Museum : M-23

General characteristics

- Crew: 2
- Length: 8.7 m (28 ft 7 in)
- Wingspan: 12.5 m (41 ft 0 in)
- Wing area: 45.8 m^{2} (493 sq ft)
- Empty weight: 1,165 kg (2,568 lb)
- Gross weight: 1,615 kg (3,560 lb)
- Powerplant: 1 × Fiat A.12 6-cylinder water-cooled in-line piston engine, 210 kW (280 hp)
- Propellers: 2-bladed fixed-pitch pusher propeller

Performance

- Maximum speed: 165 km/h (103 mph, 89 kn) estimated
- Wing loading: 35 kg/m^{2} (7.2 lb/sq ft)

== Bibliography ==
- Kulikov, Victor (December 1996). "Le fascinante histoire des hydravions de Dimitry Grigorovitch" [The Fascinating History of the Seaplanes of Dimitry Grigorovitch]. Avions: Toute l'aéronautique et son histoire (in French) (45): 20–33. ISSN 1243-8650.
