= Grigorovich MK-1 =

General information
- Type: Reconnaissance-bomber
- Manufacturer: Shchetinin
- Designer: Dmitry Pavlovich Grigorovich
- Number built: 1

History
- First flight: 1916

The Grigorovich MK-1 (MK - Morskoi Kreiser - sea cruiser) was a large trimotor floatplane, built and tested in Imperial Russia in 1916.

== Design and development ==
Grigorovich responded to a requirement for a reconnaissance-bomber, for use in the Baltic Sea and Black Sea, issued by the Imperial Russian Navy central headquarters. The resulting large seaplane following the layout of the Sikorsky Ilya Muromets, with a large glazed cabin sitting atop a long slender fuselage. The fuselage and large wings were mounted on a large central float, which also housed a large gunners cockpit housing two gunners. The wings, mounted with flexible bungee joints allowing up to 180 mm (7.1 in) of movement, also carried wing-tip floats for stability on the water. Two 220 hp (160 kW) Renault 12E V-12 water-cooled engines were mounted in strut-supported nacelles between the upper and lower mainplanes. A third engine was added to the centre section of the upper mainplane, to address perceived centre-of-gravity problems and increase the power available; initially this was to have been a 150 hp (110 kW) Sunbeam Crusader, later replaced by a 140 hp (100 kW) Hispano-Suiza 8A before flight trials commenced.

The sole MK-1 was readied for flight trials in mid-November 1916 but nosed over and sank during taxy trials before the first flight.

== Specifications (MK-1) ==
Data from The Osprey Encyclopedia of Russian Aircraft 1875–1995, Istorija konstrukcij samoletov v SSSR do 1938 g.

General characteristics

- Crew: 4
- Length: 16.5 m (54 ft 2 in)
- Wingspan: 30 m (98 ft 5 in)
- Height: 4.5 m (14 ft 9 in)
- Wing area: 165 m^{2} (1,780 sq ft) approximately
- Powerplant: 2 × Renault 12E V-12 water-cooled piston engines, 160 kW (220 hp) each
- Powerplant: 1 × Hispano-Suiza 8A V-8 water-cooled piston engine, 100 kW (140 hp)

Armament

- Guns: provision for machine-guns in the hull nose cockpit.
- Bombs: provision for bombs

== Bibliography ==
- Kulikov, Victor (December 1996). "Le fascinante histoire des hydravions de Dimitry Grigorovitch" [The Fascinating History of the Seaplanes of Dimitry Grigorovitch]. Avions: Toute l'aéronautique et son histoire (in French) (45): 20–33. ISSN 1243-8650.
