= Grigorovich MU-2 =

General information
- Type: Trainer flying boat
- Manufacturer: Grigorovich
- Number built: 1

History
- First flight: 1928

The Grigorovich MU-2 was a trainer flying boat built in the Soviet Union in the mid-1920s. It was designed by the Grigorovich Design Bureau after the failure of the Grigorovich MUR-1, featuring an all-metal hull. However, it was never put into production due to poor performance and sluggish take-off behavior.

== Specifications ==
Data from

General characteristics

- Crew: two
- Length: 8.6 m (28 ft 3 in)
- Wingspan: 11.8 m (38 ft 9 in)
- Wing area: 35.6 m^{2} (383 sq ft)
- Empty weight: 820 kg (1,808 lb)
- Gross weight: 1,086 kg (2,394 lb)
- Powerplant: 1 × Shvetsov M-11 five-cylinder air-cooled radial, 75 kW (100 hp)

Performance

- Maximum speed: 136 km/h (85 mph, 73 kn) at sea level 136 km/h (85 mph; 73 kn) at 0 m (0 ft)
- Range: 380 km (240 mi, 210 nmi)
- Endurance: 3 hours
- Service ceiling: 3,150 m (10,330 ft)
- Time to altitude: 1,000 m (3,300 ft) 10.8 minutes
- Wing loading: 30.9 kg/m^{2} (6.3 lb/sq ft)

== Bibliography ==
- Shavrov, V. B. (1985). История конструкций самолетов в СССР (in Russian). Moscow: Машиностроение. pp. Vol 1 pp.401-402.
- Kulikov, Victor (December 1996). "Le fascinante histoire des hydravions de Dimitry Grigorovitch" [The Fascinating History of the Seaplanes of Dimitry Grigorovitch]. Avions: Toute l'aéronautique et son histoire (in French) (45): 20–33. ISSN 1243-8650.
