= Grigorovich M-16 =

M-16

General information
- Type: Reconnaissance flying boat
- Manufacturer: Shchetinin
- Designer: Dmitri Grigorovich
- Primary users: Russian navy Finnish Air Force
- Number built: 40

History
- Introduction date: 1916
- Retired: 1920s
- Developed from: Grigorovich M-9

Grigorovich M-16 (alternative designation ShCh M-16, sometimes also Shchetinin M-16) was a successful Russian World War I-era biplane flying boat of the Farman type, developed from the M-9 by Grigorovich. Somewhat larger than the M-9, the M-16 was a version especially intended for winter operations, with better aerodynamic qualities.

== Wartime use ==
Six M-16s fell into Finnish hands during the Russian Civil War. The first Finnish parachute jump was made on June 17, 1922 from a M-16 by Eero Erho. The aircraft were flown until 1923. One additional plane was captured by the fledgling Estonian Air Force.

== Variants ==
- M-16 : Two-seat reconnaissance floatplane.

== Operators ==
Estonia

- Estonian Air Force

Finland

- Finnish Air Force

Russia

- Imperial Russian Navy

Soviet Union

- Soviet Naval Aviation

== Specifications (M-16) ==
Data from Thulinista Hornetiin – 75 vuotta Suomen ilmavoimien lentokoneita, Grigorovich Flying Boats

General characteristics

- Crew: 2
- Length: 8.6 m (28 ft 3 in)
- Wingspan: 18 m (59 ft 1 in)
- Wing area: 61.8 m^{2} (665 sq ft)
- Empty weight: 1,100 kg (2,425 lb)
- Max takeoff weight: 1,450 kg (3,197 lb)
- Powerplant: 1 × Salmson P9 -cylinder water-cooled radial piston engine, 110 kW (150 hp)

Performance

- Maximum speed: 120 km/h (75 mph, 65 kn)
- Endurance: 4 hours
- Service ceiling: 3,500 m (11,500 ft)

Armament

- Guns: 1x Machine gun

== Bibliography ==
- Gerdessen, Frederik. "Estonian Air Power 1918 – 1945". Air Enthusiast, No. 18, April – July 1982. pp. 61–76. ISSN 0143-5450.
- Kulikov, Victor (December 1996). "Le fascinante histoire des hydravions de Dimitry Grigorovitch" [The Fascinating History of the Seaplanes of Dimitry Grigorovitch]. Avions: Toute l'aéronautique et son histoire (in French) (45): 20–33. ISSN 1243-8650.
