= Halina Centkiewicz-Michalska =

Polish painter (1912–2007)

- Born: 10 March 1912; Warsaw, Poland
- Died: 1 September 2007 (aged 95)
- Education: Academy of Fine Arts in Warsaw
- Known for: Painting

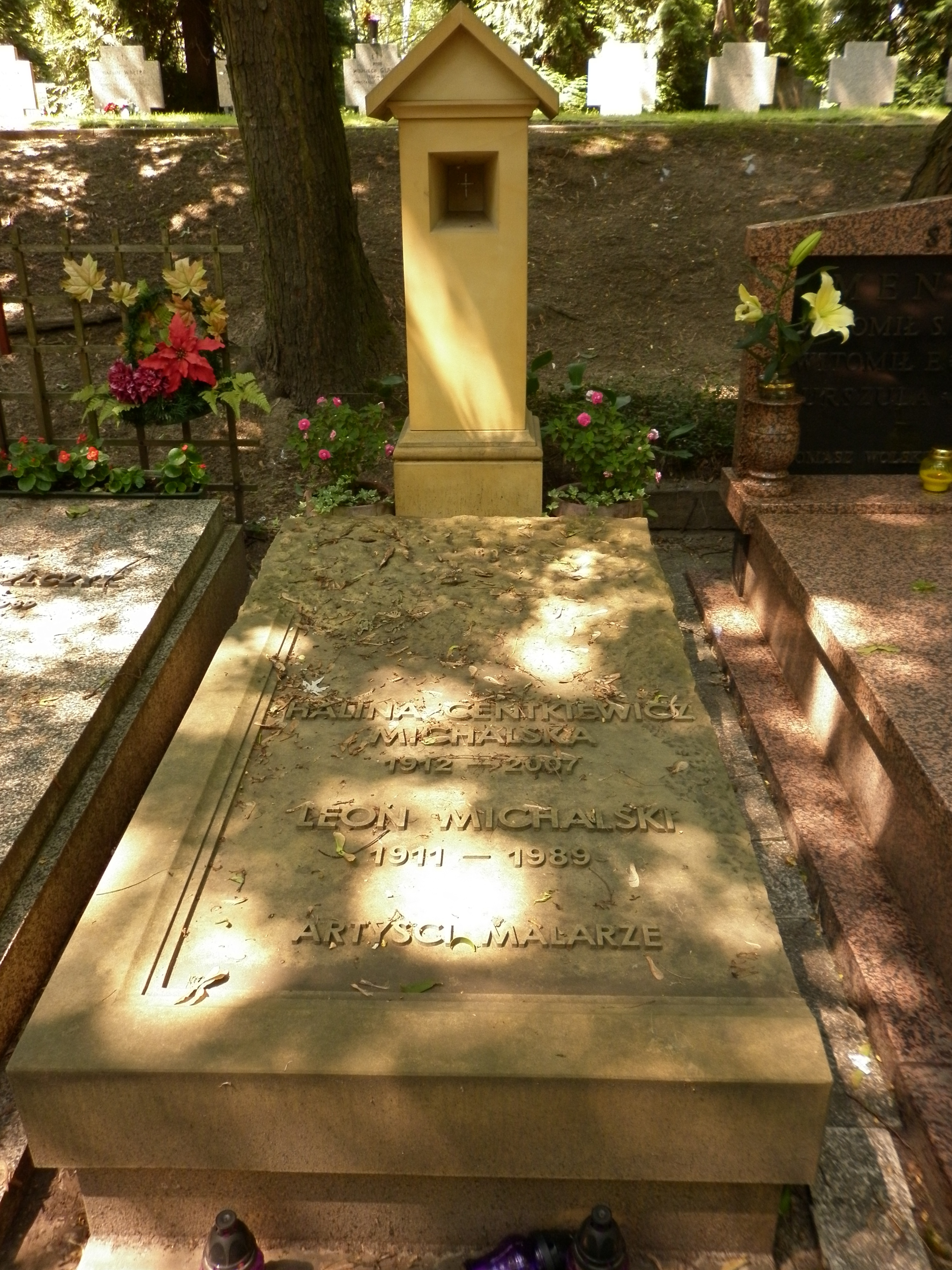
Grave of Halina Centkiewicz-Michalska

Halina Centkiewicz-Michalska (born 10 March 1912 in Warsaw, died 1 September 2007) was a Polish painter and a long-time lecturer at the Faculty of Graphics of the Academy of Fine Arts in Warsaw, where she had been a pre-war graduate. She studied alongside painter Zofia Matuszczyk-Cygańska, and was a member of the Association of Polish Painters and Graphic Artists (ZPAMiG).

Her works were exhibited, among others, at the first ZPAMiG exhibition in March 1986, held at the Zachęta Gallery in Warsaw. She also held solo exhibitions, including one in 1964 at Kordegarda Gallery and another in 1969 at the Bureau of Art Exhibitions in Olsztyn.

== Personal life ==
Her parents were Stanisław Rudolf Centkiewicz and Stanisława Bresteczer. She was the younger sister of Czesław Centkiewicz, a traveler and writer. In September 1939, she married Leon Kazimierz Michalski, a painter. She was buried on 6 September 2007 at the Powązki Military Cemetery in Warsaw (section AII-1-22).

== Honors ==
- Gold Cross of Merit
