= Grigorovich M-19 =

M-19

General information
- National origin: Russia
- Manufacturer: Grigorovich

The Grigorovich M-19 was a reconnaissance flying boat designed by Grigorovich in the late 1910s. The M-19 was a Grigorovich M-9 modified to be of the same size as the Grigorovich M-15. Assembly of the prototype was started in 1918, but the aircraft was not completed.

== Specifications (M-19) ==
Data from

General characteristics

- Length: 8.5 m (27 ft 11 in)
- Wingspan: 13 m (42 ft 8 in)
- Wing area: 48 m^{2} (520 sq ft)
- Powerplant: 1 × Salmson radial engine 9-cylinder water-cooled radial piston engine, 120 kW (160 hp)

Performance

== Bibliography ==
- Kulikov, Victor (December 1996). "Le fascinante histoire des hydravions de Dimitry Grigorovitch" [The Fascinating History of the Seaplanes of Dimitry Grigorovitch]. Avions: Toute l'aéronautique et son histoire (in French) (45): 20–33. ISSN 1243-8650.
