= Shchetinin =

Russian aviation company

Shchetinin (Russian: Щетинин) was the first Russian aviation company. It was founded in St. Petersburg in 1910 under the name Pervoye Rossiyskoye Tovarishchestvo Vozdukhoplavaniya S. S. Shchetinin i Ko (First Russian Aeronautical Company S. S. Shchetinin and Co.). The company was led by the famous pilot S. S. Shchetinin and the lead designer was Dmitry Pavlovich Grigorovich. The company focused mainly on a series of flying boats, which initially were modeled after the American aircraft Curtiss Model K. A lengthy series of aircraft, starting with the designation letter "M" (Marine) followed. Famous aircraft were the M-5, M-9, M-11/M-12, M-15, M-16 and M-24/M-24bis.

== History ==
The plant was founded by Sergey Sergeevich Shchetinin, a lawyer from St. Petersburg. It was called "First Russian Aeronautical Company S. S. Shchetinin and Co. (PRTV)".

=== During the First World War ===
By the summer of 1914 the plant was mainly producing licensed and unlicensed copies of French aircraft. They were created for the needs of the Ministry of War. The first experimental domestic seaplanes of D.P. Grigorovich's design were built.

During the war the plant established the production of non-aviation products; sanitary buggies, boxes for shells and spare wheels were produced at the plant.

== Aircraft ==
See Grigorovich (design bureau) for a full list of aircraft.
