= Grigorovich M-24 =

- A Grigorovich M-24 flying over Petrograd in December 1924

General information
- Type: Biplane flying boat
- Designer: Dmitri Grigorovich
- Status: Retired
- Primary user: Soviet Navy
- Number built: 60

History
- Introduction date: 1924
- First flight: 1923
- Retired: 1926

The Grigorovich M-24 was a Soviet biplane flying boat built during the 1920s.

Dmitri Grigorovich began developing the aircraft in April 1922, whilst he was flying the successful Grigorovich M-9. Flight tests with the aircraft, which featured a 14-metre wingspan and a maximum speed of 160 km/h, began in 1923 and subsequently 40 aircraft were produced, which were delivered from April 1924. The flight performance was poor, however, and the pilots and maintenance personnel complained about the aircraft's many defects.

Following these complaints, Grigorovich began working on a revised version of the aircraft as the M-24bis. One development he made was building a stronger engine, with 260 hp, as opposed to the original which produced 220 hp. Twenty of the new aircraft were built, and they were used, until 1926, by the Soviet Navy for coastal reconnaissance.
