= Dmitry Grigorovich =

Dmitry Grigorovich may refer to:

- Dmitry Grigorovich (writer) (1822–1900), Russian writer
- Dmitry Grigorovich (engineer) (1883–1938), Soviet Russian aircraft designer
