= Jan Nagórski =

Polish engineer and aviation pioneer (1888–1976)

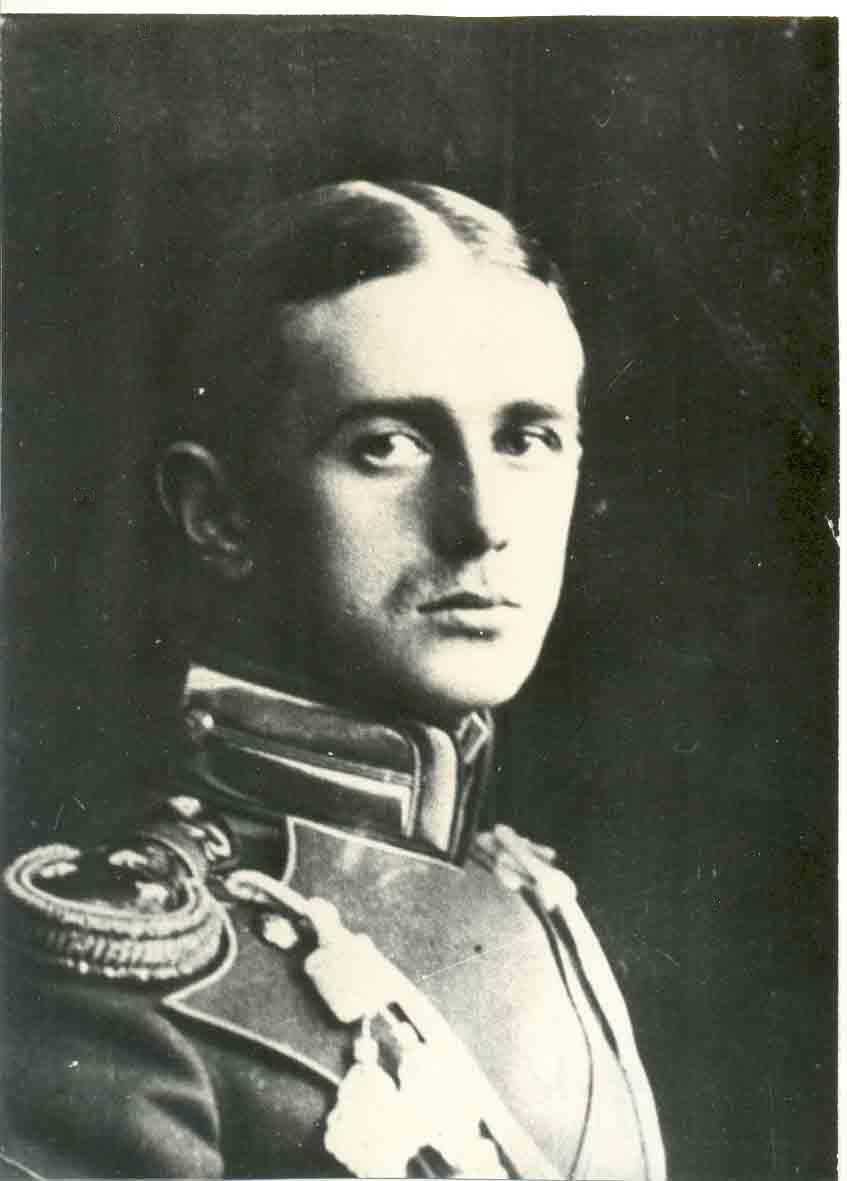
- Born: January 27, 1888; Włocławek, Russian Empire
- Died: June 9, 1976 (aged 88); Warsaw, Poland
- Resting place: Wólka Węglowa cemetery, Bielany, Warsaw
- Citizenship: Polish
- Known for: Aviator, engineer and Arctic explorer
- Awards: Order of St. Stanislaus, Polonia Restituta
- Aviation career
- Air force: Imperial Russian Navy, Red Army

Alfons Jan Nagórski (1888–1976), also known as Ivan Iosifovich Nagursky, was a Polish engineer and pioneer of aviation, the first person to fly an airplane in the Arctic and the first aviator to perform a loop with a flying boat.

== Biography ==
=== Early life ===
Jan Nagórski was born on January 27, 1888, in Włocławek, Russian Empire. He completed a local trade school and in 1909 graduated from an infantry junker school in Odessa and the All-Russian Aeroclub in 1912. The following year he accomplished his training at the Naval Engineering School in Gatchina near St. Petersburg where he earned his wings. He was among the first pilots of the Imperial Russian Navy.

=== Career ===
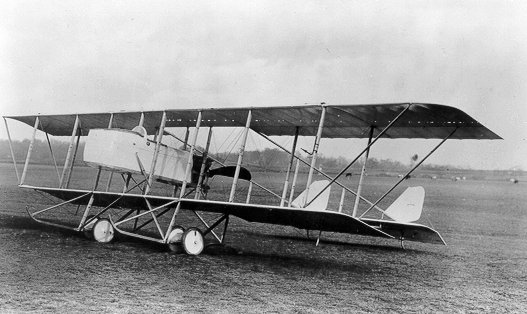
The Farman MF.11 plane used by Jan Nagórski in his pioneering flights off NW Novaya Zemlya

In 1914 Nagórski was tasked with the difficult mission of locating the expedition of Georgy Sedov, Georgy Brusilov, and Vladimir Rusanov in the Russian Arctic. In a Maurice Farman MF11 plane, specially purchased for that purpose in France, Nagórski embarked on a ship in Arkhangelsk and arrived to Novaya Zemlya, whence he initiated a series of reconnaissance flights in difficult Arctic conditions. Between August 21 and September 13, 1914, he flew five missions, spending more than ten hours in the air and travelling more than a thousand kilometres over land and the Barents Sea. During the last flight he reached the 76th parallel north. Nagórski failed to find Sedov's expedition, but he gained valuable experience as the first polar aviator in history. His report to the Admiralty prepared after his return, as well as a report of Nagórski's achievements by Admiral Mikhail Zhdanko, included a number of suggestions that would prove invaluable to every polar aviator. Among them was the idea of painting red all the planes operating in the Arctic, to make them more visible. His achievements proved that the North Pole could be reached by airplane. He was awarded the Order of St. Stanislaus, class III in 1914.

Upon his return from the Arctic, Nagórski returned to active service in naval aviation during World War I. Stationed in Åbo (Turku) in Finland, he operated a variety of planes on patrol missions above the Baltic Sea and commanded an air squadron of the Baltic Fleet. During that time, he performed the first ever loop with a flying boat (September 17, 1916). The following day Nagórski repeated the loop twice with his experimental Grigorovich M-9 plane. For his wartime service, Nagórski was awarded with five Russian military medals. The following year his plane was damaged above the Baltic Sea and Nagórski was declared missing. After several hours at sea, he was rescued by a Russian submarine and escorted to a military hospital in Riga. He quickly recovered and returned to his unit, but the report of his recovery never reached headquarters.

=== Return to Poland ===
After the October Revolution, Nagórski's unit became a part of the Red Army and took part in the Russian Civil War. He returned to Poland in 1919 and attempted to join the Polish Navy, but was turned down due to his past service with the Reds. In the chaos of the Russian Civil War, Nagórski's personal files were lost and he was declared dead by Russian authorities. He then settled in southern Poland and started working as an engineer and designer of refrigerators and coolers for the sugar and oil industries.

In 1925 Nagórski's report of his flights to the Arctic reached Richard Byrd, who contacted him and asked for more details on weather conditions and other tips. The information obtained proved valuable during his later Arctic and Antarctic expeditions. Among other pioneers of Arctic aviation to take advantage of Nagórski's experience were Walter Mittelholzer and Boris Chukhnovsky. Forgotten in Poland and believed dead in Russia, Nagórski gained much fame. In 1936 the Soviet Nagurskoye meteorological station in Franz Josef Land (80°49′N 47°25′E) was named after him.

Nagórski survived World War II and continued his career as a civil worker in Gdańsk and then as an engineer in Warsaw. In 1955, during one of his lectures, Czesław Centkiewicz, a renowned Polish polar explorer and author, presented the audience with a short biographical note of a "long-forgotten pioneer of aviation, pilot Jan Nagórski who died in 1917". Nagórski, who remained interested in exploration of the polar areas and was present at the lecture stood up and announced that he was not Russian and definitely not dead. This revelation became widely publicised by the Polish media and Nagórski's achievements were rediscovered. On Centkiewicz's suggestion, Nagórski described his Arctic flights in a book entitled The First Above Arctic (1958). In 1960, he published Over the Burning Baltic, the memoirs of his World War I service. As a late recognition of his deeds, Nagórski was awarded the Officer's Cross of the Polonia Restituta by Polish President.

=== Death ===
He died on June 9, 1976, and was buried at the Wólka Węglowa cemetery in the Bielany district of Warsaw.

== See also ==
- Nagurskoye (air base)

== Footnotes ==
1. Russian: Иван Иосифович Нагурский
2. Zhdanko, M.E. Первый гидроаэроплан в Северном Ледовитом океане (The First hydro-aeroplane over the Northern Ocean), Petrograd, 1917.
3. Initially Soviet encyclopedias, including the Great Soviet Encyclopedia, claimed that Nagórski was killed in action in 1917. It was not until 1974 when both the biographical note and Nagórski's name were corrected in most Soviet publications under insistence from Ryszard Badowski.

== Sources ==
- Jerzy Ryszard Konieczny (1984). Kronika lotnictwa polskiego 1241-1945 (in Polish). Warsaw: Wydawnictwa Komunikacji i Łączności. p. 153. ISBN 83-206-0426-5.
- A.B. Grigoriev (1989). Альбатросы: Из истории гидроавиации (Albatroses: from the history of hydroaviation) (in Russian). Moscow: Машиностроение. p. 272. ISBN 5-217-00604-8. Archived from the original on 2005-02-26.
- Ryszard Badowski (2001). Odkrywanie świata. Bielsko-Biała: Pascal. p. 318. ISBN 83-7304-013-7.
- Jan Nagórski (1958). Pierwszy nad Arktyką.
- Jan Nagórski (1960). Nad płonącym Bałtykiem.
- "Нагурский Ян Иосифович-". Great Soviet Encyclopedia.
