= Grigorovich TB-5 =

TB-5

General information
- Type: Heavy bomber
- National origin: Soviet Union
- Designer: Grigorovich
- Status: Retired
- Primary user: Soviet Union
- Number built: One

History
- First flight: 1 May 1931

The Grigorovich TB-5 (Russian: Григорович ТБ-5) was an experimental heavy bomber designed and tested in the Soviet Union in the early 1930s. Designed as a competitor for the Tupolev TB-3, the TB-5 was intended to be powered by two FED 24-cylinder X engines of 746 kW (1,000 hp) each. When these were canceled, the underwing pods were revised to each house a pair of Bristol Jupiter engines in a push-pull configuration. Despite projected performance inferior to TB-3, it was hoped that TB-5 would gain an advantage by using less metal (in short supply at the time) thanks to its mixed construction of fabric-covered metal frame.

Test flights began on 1 May 1931 with disappointing results, in part due to poor thrust of the rear-facing engines. The prototype TB-5 was wrecked in a crash landing following the in-flight detachment of an engine in the spring of 1932, and with the entry into service of the superior TB-3 that year, the TB-5 project was abandoned.

== Specifications (TB-5) ==
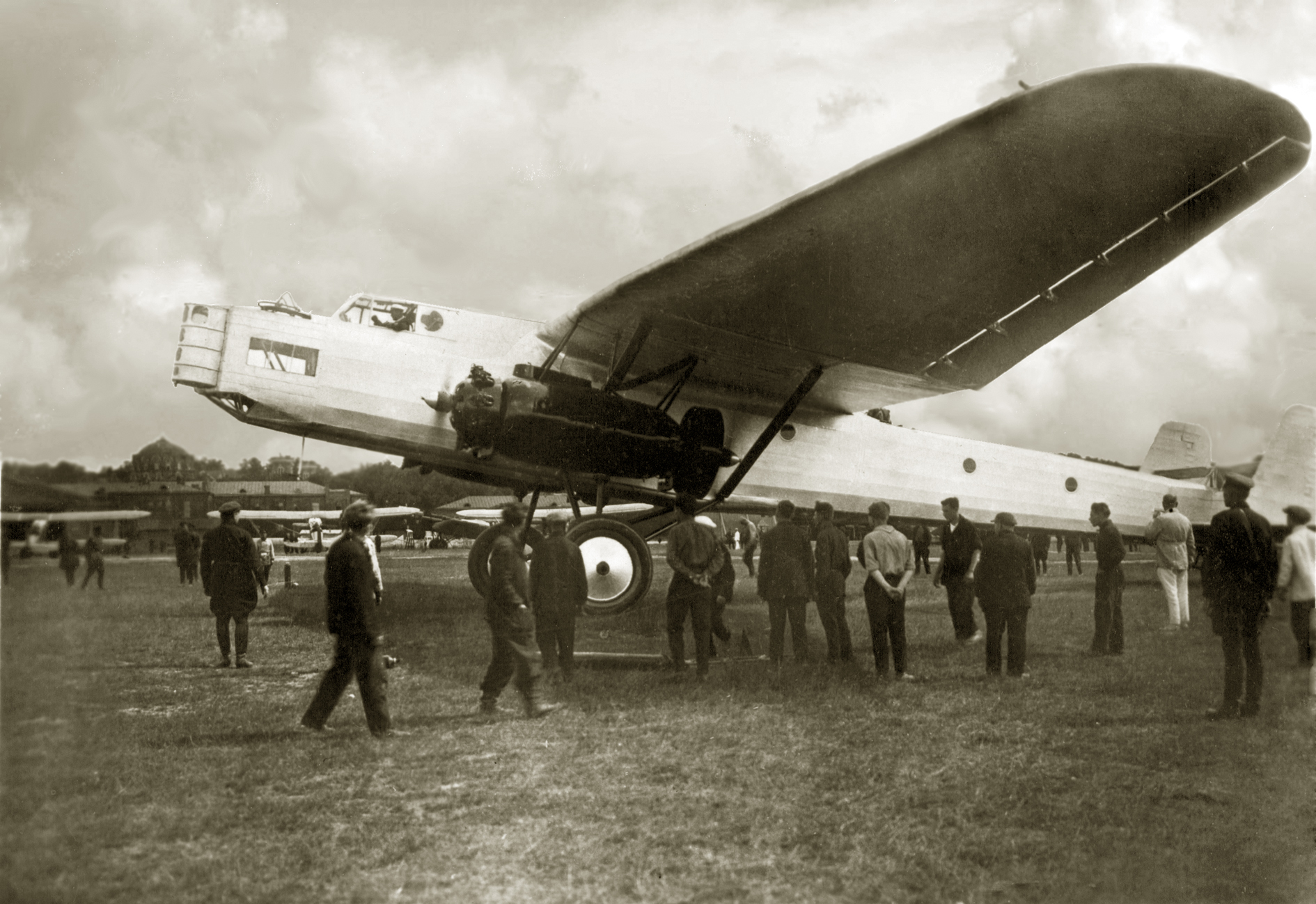
TB-5 at the Central aerodrome

Data from Shavrov 1985

General characteristics

- Crew: Six
- Length: 22.1 m (72 ft 6 in)
- Wingspan: 31 m (101 ft 8 in)
- Wing area: 150 m^{2} (1,600 sq ft)
- Airfoil: root: TsAGI R-II (18%); tip: TsAGI R-II (12%)
- Empty weight: 7,483 kg (16,497 lb)
- Gross weight: 12,535 kg (27,635 lb)
- Powerplant: 4 × Bristol Jupiter V 9-cylinder air-cooled radial piston engines, 336 kW (451 hp) each in tandem nacelles
- Propellers: 2-bladed variable-pitch propellers

Performance

- Maximum speed: 180 km/h (110 mph, 97 kn)
- Range: 2,600 km (1,600 mi, 1,400 nmi)
- Wing loading: 84 kg/m^{2} (17 lb/sq ft)
- Power/mass: 0.107 kW/kg (0.065 hp/lb)

Armament

- Guns: Two turrets, each with 2× 7.62 mm (0.3 in) PV-1 machine guns
- Bombs: Up to 2,500 kg (5,512 lb) of bombs

== See also ==
Aircraft of comparable role, configuration, and era

- Tupolev TB-3
- Farman F.220
