= Grigorovich SUVP =

1925 airliner by Grigorovich

SUVP

General information
- Type: Passenger
- Manufacturer: Grigorovich
- Designer: Dmitry Grigorovich
- Number built: 1

History
- First flight: 1925

The SUVP was a high-wing passenger aircraft designed by Dmitry Pavlovich Grigorovich. It was built in 1925 at the Krasny Letchik factory in Russia, ordered by Ukrvozdukhput. Its fuselage was composed of metal tubing, its skin was fabric, and the wings were constructed out of wood. The aircraft was powered by a 100 hp (75 kW) Bristol Lucifer. Only one was ever produced, and the SUVP saw service with Ukrainian airlines.

== Specifications (SUVP) ==
Data from Aircraft of Dmitry Grigorovich

General characteristics

- Crew: 1
- Capacity: 3 pax
- Length: 8.4 m (27 ft 7 in)
- Wingspan: 13.7 m (44 ft 11 in)
- Height: 3.7 m (12 ft 2 in)
- Wing area: 24.14 m^{2} (259.8 sq ft)
- Empty weight: 820 kg (1,808 lb)
- Gross weight: 1,150 kg (2,535 lb)
- Powerplant: 1 × Bristol Lucifer 3-cylinder air-cooled radial piston engine, 75 kW (100 hp)

Performance

- Maximum speed: 139 km/h (86 mph, 75 kn)
- Endurance: 4.5 hours
- Service ceiling: 3,050 m (10,010 ft)
- Time to altitude: 40 minutes to 3,000 m (9,800 ft)
