= Grigorovich DI-3 =

DI-3

General information
- Type: Fighter
- National origin: Soviet Union
- Manufacturer: Grigorovich

History
- First flight: August 1931

The Grigorovich DI-3 (Russian: Григорович ДИ-3), (Dvukhmyestnyi Istrebitel - two-seat fighter), was a prototype two-seat fighter developed in the Soviet Union in the 1930s. It was intended to be a long-range escort fighter developed from the DI-2 with improved range and performance comparable to single-seat fighter aircraft of the time. DI-3 was a single-bay biplane of mixed construction with a twin-rudder tailplane of variable incidence.

Although initial tests demonstrated flight characteristics comparable to Polikarpov I-5, the addition of armament and operational equipment caused significant degradation in performance and DI-3 did not enter mass production. The prototype was subsequently fitted with an enclosed cockpit and used as a VIP transport.

== Specifications (DI-3) ==
Data from Istoriia konstruktskii samoletov v SSSR do 1938

General characteristics

- Crew: 2
- Length: 7.8 m (25 ft 7 in)
- Wingspan: 11.8 m (38 ft 9 in)
- Wing area: 30.1 m^{2} (324 sq ft)
- Empty weight: 1,487 kg (3,278 lb)
- Gross weight: 2,122 kg (4,678 lb)
- Powerplant: 1 × BMW VI 7.3z V-12 liquid-cooled piston engine, 545 kW (731 hp)
- Propellers: 2-bladed fixed-pitch propeller

Performance

- Maximum speed: 256 km/h (159 mph, 138 kn)
- Service ceiling: 6,300 m (20,700 ft)
- Time to altitude: 5,000 m (16,000 ft) in 17 minutes 30 seconds
- Wing loading: 70 kg/m^{2} (14 lb/sq ft)
- Power/mass: 0.26 kW/kg (0.16 hp/lb)
- Horizontal turn time: 13 sec

Armament
