= Grigorovich ROM-2 =

ROM-2

General information
- Type: Reconnaissance flying boat
- Designer: Dmitry Pavlovich Grigorovich
- Primary user: Soviet Navy
- Number built: 1

History
- First flight: Summer 1929
- Developed from: Grigorovich ROM-1

The Grigorovich ROM-2 (bureau designation MR-3; military designation MDR-1) was a long-range reconnaissance flying boat designed by the Grigorovich Design Bureau for the Soviet Navy in the late 1920s.

== Design ==
The ROM-2 (ROM = Razviedchik Otkrytovo Morya [Open Sea Reconnaissance]) was a long range maritime reconnaissance sesquiplane flying boat with the engines arranged in tractor form in two separate nacelles. The wing and the hull were radically redesigned, most of the plywood wing skin was replaced by fabric. As a result, payload (including fuel) almost doubled, and other parameters were improved

Test flights began in the summer of 1929, and the ROM-2 had much better performance than the ROM-1, but those performance results were unsatisfactory for the 1930s. Testing ended after a rough landing on one flight. Modifications were undertaken to the airframe, with the hull shortened by 0.2m, the engines raised above the wing on short N-struts, and the aircraft was redesignated ROM-2bis, but the aircraft never flew in this configuration.

== Specifications ==
Data from

General characteristics

- Crew: 4
- Length: 17.4 m (57 ft 1 in)
- Wingspan: 26.8 m (87 ft 11 in)
- Wing area: 108.2 m^{2} (1,165 sq ft)
- Empty weight: 4,150 kg (9,149 lb)
- Max takeoff weight: 6,857 kg (15,117 lb)
- Powerplant: 2 × BMV VI V-cylinder inline engine, 372 kW (499 hp) each

Performance

- Maximum speed: 180 km/h (110 mph, 97 kn)
- Endurance: 5 hours
- Service ceiling: 4,500 m (14,800 ft)
- Time to altitude: 1,000 m (3,281 ft) in 7.0 minutes
- Wing loading: 61.0 kg/m^{2} (12.5 lb/sq ft)

Armament

- Guns: 4 × machine guns

== Sources ==
- Kulikov, Victor (December 1996). "Le fascinante histoire des hydravions de Dimitry Grigorovitch" [The Fascinating History of the Seaplanes of Dimitry Grigorovitch]. Avions: Toute l'aéronautique et son histoire (in French) (45): 20–33. ISSN 1243-8650.
