= Grigorovich MRL-1 =

1920s Soviet reconnaissance flying boat

MRL-1

General information
- Type: Reconnaissance flying boat
- Designer: Dmitry Pavlovich Grigorovich
- Primary user: Soviet Navy
- Number built: 1

History
- First flight: 2 June 1925

The Grigorovich MRL-1 was a long-range reconnaissance flying boat designed by the Grigorovich Design Bureau for the Soviet Navy in the mid-1920s.

== Design ==
The MRL-1 had a very elegant and clean appearance, but the hull construction was very expensive due to the overuse of expensive redwood, and therefore seriously overweight. Gunner position was located right behind the propeller.

Although speed requirements were fulfilled, the ceiling and climb were unacceptably poor, and the flawed hull design precipitated 'wave pushing' and delayed takeoff. Therefore, the MRL-1 was not accepted for production, the lone airframe instead spending its career with the White Sea Fleet.

== Specifications ==
Data from , Aircraft of the Soviet Union : the encyclopaedia of Soviet aircraft since 1917

General characteristics

- Crew: 2
- Length: 10.6 m (34 ft 9 in)
- Wingspan: 13.2 m (43 ft 4 in)
- Wing area: 50.0 m^{2} (538 sq ft)
- Empty weight: 1,660 kg (3,660 lb)
- Max takeoff weight: 2,600 kg (5,732 lb)
- Powerplant: 1 × Liberty L-12 V-12 water-cooled piston engine, 300 kW (400 hp)

Performance

- Maximum speed: 185 km/h (115 mph, 100 kn)
- Endurance: 5 hours
- Service ceiling: 3,050 m (10,010 ft)
- Time to altitude: 1,000 m (3,281 ft) in 11.0 minutes
- Wing loading: 52.0 kg/m^{2} (10.7 lb/sq ft)

Armament

- Guns: 1-2 x machine guns

== Bibliography ==
- Kulikov, Victor (December 1996). "Le fascinante histoire des hydravions de Dimitry Grigorovitch" [The Fascinating History of the Seaplanes of Dimitry Grigorovitch]. Avions: Toute l'aéronautique et son histoire (in French) (45): 20–33. ISSN 1243-8650.
