= Grigorovich M-11 =

M-11
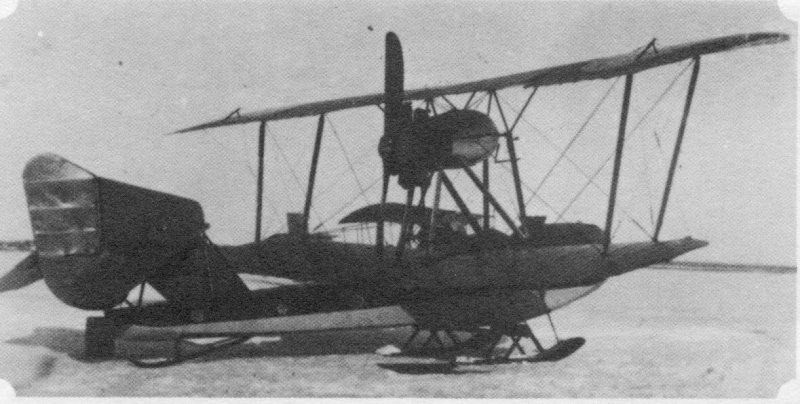

General information
- Type: Single-seat fighter flying boat
- National origin: Russia
- Manufacturer: Shchetinin
- Designer: Dmitry Pavlovich Grigorovich
- Number built: 60+

History
- First flight: 1916

The Grigorovich M-11 (or Shchetinin M-11) was a Russian single-seat fighter flying boat designed by Dmitry Pavlovich Grigorovich and built by Shchetinin

== Design and development ==
Originally conceived as a two-seater the prototype M-11 was built in 1916 at the Shchetinin factory in Petrograd. The M-11 was a biplane with a 100 hp (75 kW) Gnome Monosoupape rotary engine with a pusher propeller strut mounted below the upper wing. The small number of two-seaters had a poor performance and were only used as trainers, Grigorovich developed a single-seat version powered by a 110 hp (82 kW) Le Rhône engine and fitted with a forward firing machine gun in front of the cockpit. Originally 100 single-seat M-11s had been ordered but this was reduced to 60 as the aircraft had poor handling when landing or alighting on water. The M-11 was operated from snow and ice with twin skis fitted under the forward fuselage and a single ski under the tailplane.

To improve the water handling an improved variant was developed as the M-12 which had a re-designed hull and reduced loaded weight. Although the climb to height was improved the forward speed was 5 mph (8 km/h) less than the M-11 consequentially only a few M-12s were built.

== Variants ==
M-11 (two-seat)
Small numbers built for training use.
M-11 (single-seat)
Production variant, 60 built.
M-12
Improved version.

== Operators ==
Estonia

- Estonian Air Force

Russia

- Imperial Russian Navy

Soviet Union

- Soviet Naval Aviation

== Specifications (M-11 single-seater) ==
Data from

General characteristics

- Crew: 1
- Length: 7.60 m (24 ft 11.25 in)
- Wingspan: 8.75 m (28 ft 8.5 in)
- Wing area: 26 m^{2} (279.87 sq ft)
- Empty weight: 676 kg (1,490 lb)
- Gross weight: 926 kg (2,041 lb)
- Powerplant: 1 × Le Rhône rotary piston , 82 kW (110 hp)

Performance

- Maximum speed: 148 km/h (92 mph, 80 kn)
- Endurance: 2 hours 42 minutes

Armament

- 1 x 7.62mm (0.3 in) Maxim machine-gun

== See also ==
Related lists

- List of flying boats and floatplanes

== Bibliography ==
- Gerdessen, Frederik. "Estonian Air Power 1918 – 1945". Air Enthusiast, No. 18, April – July 1982. pp. 61–76. ISSN 0143-5450.
- Kulikov, Victor (December 1996). "Le fascinante histoire des hydravions de Dimitry Grigorovitch" [The Fascinating History of the Seaplanes of Dimitry Grigorovitch]. Avions: Toute l'aéronautique et son histoire (in French) (45): 20–33. ISSN 1243-8650.
- Taylor, Michael J. H. (1989). Jane's Encyclopedia of Aviation. London: Studio Editions.
- The Illustrated Encyclopedia of Aircraft (Part Work 1982–1985). Orbis Publishing.
