= Grigorovich M-5 =

M-5
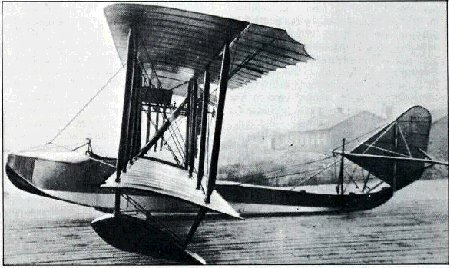

General information
- Type: Reconnaissance flying boat
- National origin: Russia
- Manufacturer: Shchetinin
- Designer: Dmitry Pavlovich Grigorovich
- Primary users: Imperial Russian Navy Finnish Air Force
- Number built: c. 300

History
- First flight: 1915
- Retired: 1920s
- Developed from: Grigorovich M-4
- Variants: Grigorovich MUR-1

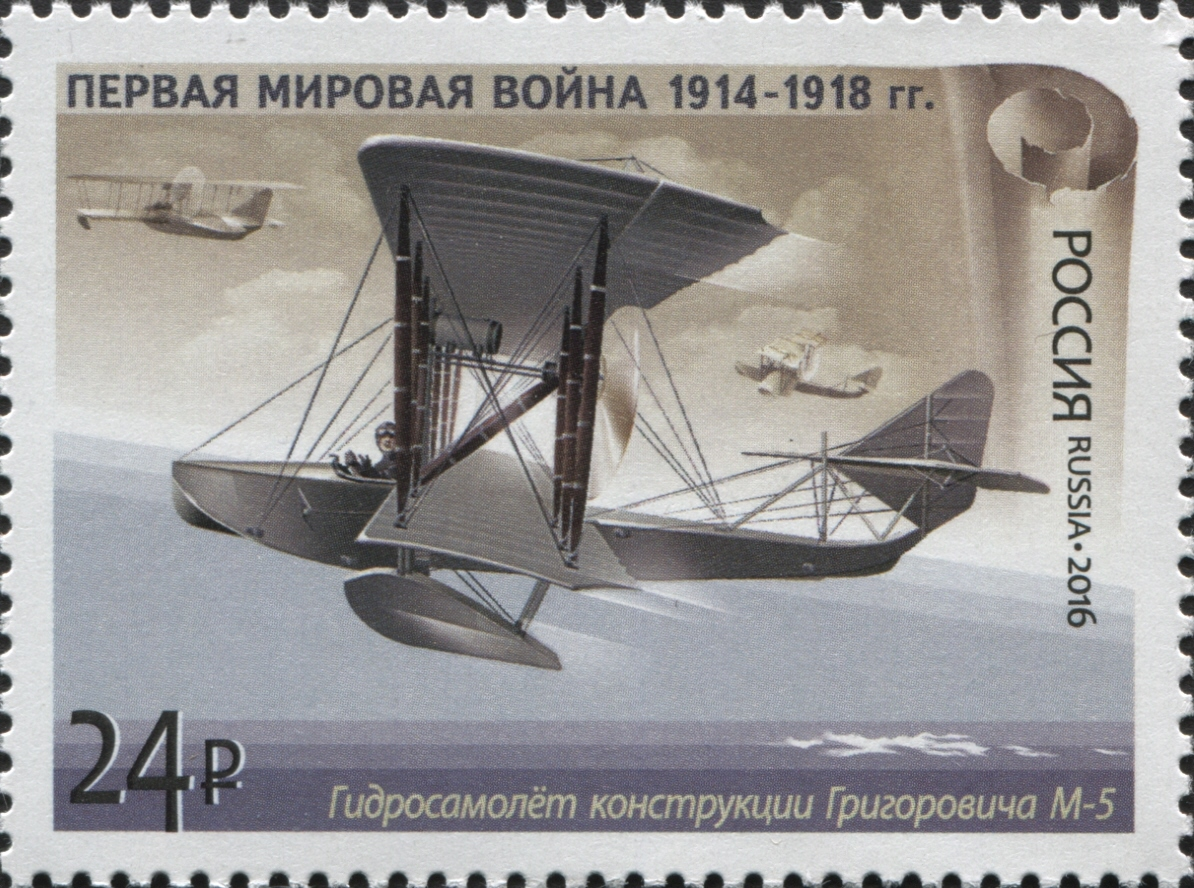
M-5 on a 2016 Russian stamp

Grigorovich M-5 (alternative designation Shch M-5, sometimes also Shchetinin M-5) was a successful Russian World War I-era two-bay unequal-span biplane flying boat with a single step hull, designed by Grigorovich. It was the first mass production flying boat built in Russia.

== Design and development ==
The aircraft designer Dmitry Pavlovich Grigorovich completed his first flying boat (the model M-1) in late 1913, and produced a series of prototypes, gradually improving the design, until the M-5 appeared in the spring of 1915, which was to be his first aircraft to enter series production, with at least 100 being produced, primarily to replace foreign built aircraft, including Curtiss Model K and FBA flying boats.

The M-5 was of a wooden construction, the hull was covered in plywood and the wings and tailplane were covered in fabric. Aft of the step the hull tapered sharply into little more than a boom, supporting a characteristic single fin and rudder tail unit, which was braced by means of struts and wires. It was normally powered by a 100 hp Gnome Monosoupape engine mounted as a pusher between the wings, but some used 110 hp Le Rhône or 130 hp Clerget engines. The pilot and the observer were accommodated side-by-side in a large cockpit forward of the wings, the observer provided with a single 7.62 mm Vickers machine gun on a pivoted mounting.

== Operational history ==
Most of the M-5s served in the Black Sea or in the Baltic, initially with the Imperial Russian naval air arm and later with both sides in the Russian Civil War. Some remained in service until the late 1920s as trainers, reconnaissance and utility aircraft.

One M-5 fell into Finnish hands when it was found drifting at Kuokkala in 1918. The aircraft was flown by the Finnish Air Force until 1919, when it sank. Only one example survives today in the Istanbul Aviation Museum in Turkey, preserved in Ottoman Air Force markings.

== Variants ==
M-5
Main version.
M-6
M-5 with 150 hp Sunbeam engine. (Unsuccessful).
M-7
M-5 with rounded hull and larger keel. Poor take off characteristics.
M-8
Version with further rounded hull. Incapable of water take-off.
M-10
Smaller version built in 1916. Gnome Monosoupape engine.
M-20
Two-seat reconnaissance. Le Rhone 89 kW (120 hp) engine, built in limited numbers from 1916

== Operators ==
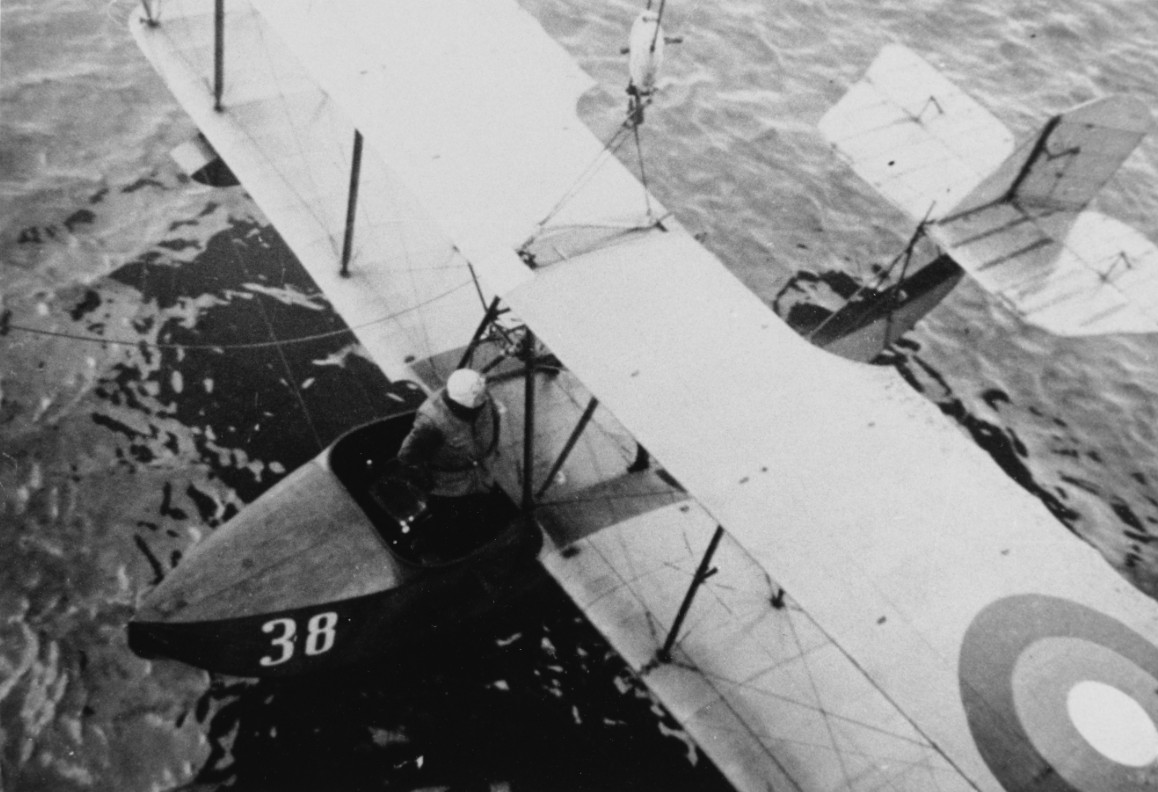
M-5 in the Black Sea in about 1915 during World War I

Finland

- Finnish Air Force

Russia

- Imperial Russian Navy
- White Army

Russian SFSR

- Red Army

Soviet Union

- Soviet Naval Aviation

== Specifications (M-5) ==
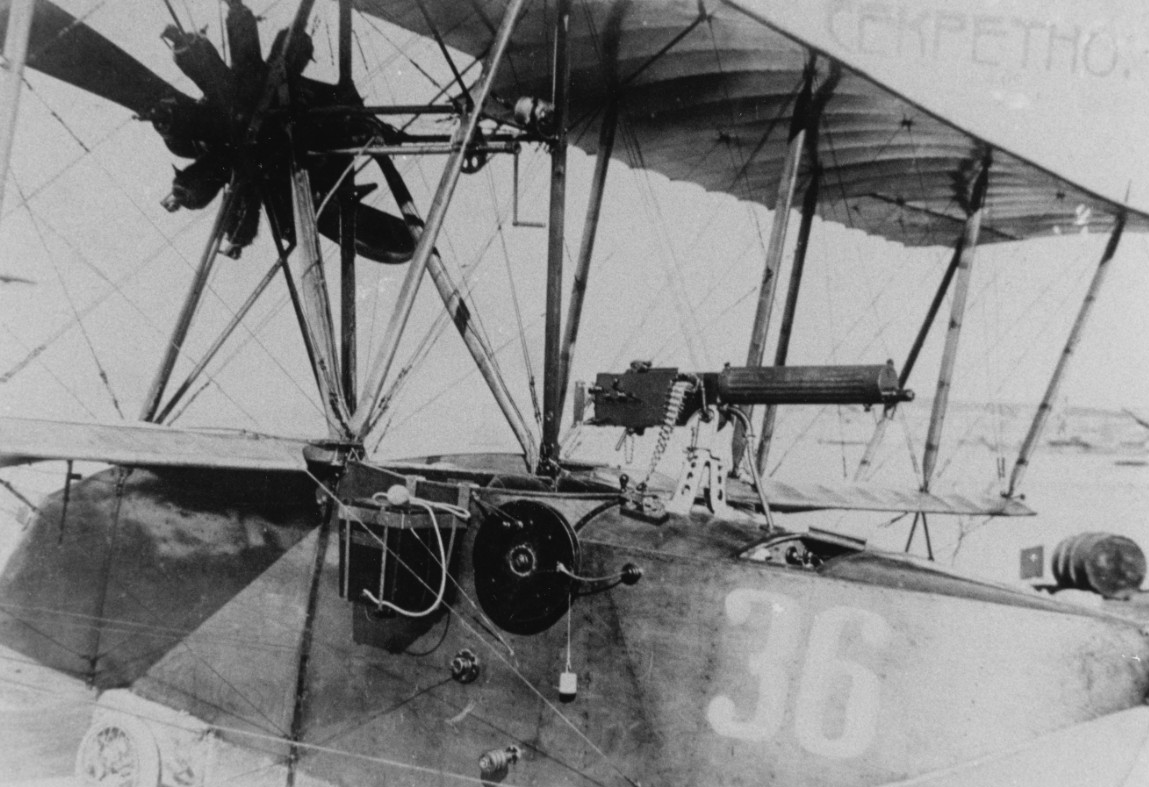
Close-up view of a M-5 armed with a Maxim machine gun

Data from Thulinista Hornettiin

General characteristics

- Crew: 2
- Length: 8.6 m (28 ft 3 in)
- Wingspan: 13.62 m (44 ft 8 in)
- Wing area: 37.9 m^{2} (408 sq ft)
- Empty weight: 660 kg (1,455 lb)
- Max takeoff weight: 960 kg (2,116 lb)
- Powerplant: 1 × Gnome Monosoupape 9 Type B-2 9-cyl. air-cooled rotary piston engine, 75 kW (101 hp)

Performance

- Maximum speed: 105 km/h (65 mph, 57 kn)
- Endurance: 4 hours
- Service ceiling: 3,300 m (10,800 ft)
- Rate of climb: 1.85 m/s (364 ft/min)
- Time to altitude: 1,000 m (3,281 ft) in 9.6 minutes
- Wing loading: 25 kg/m^{2} (5.1 lb/sq ft)
- Power/mass: 0.078 kW/kg (0.05 hp/lb)

Armament

- Guns: 1 x 7.62 mm (0.300 in) Vickers machine gun

== Sources ==
- Heinonen, Timo: Thulinista Hornetiin - Keski-Suomen ilmailumuseon julkaisuja 3, Keski-Suomen ilmailumuseo, 1992, ISBN 951-95688-2-4
- Kulikov, Victor (December 1996). "Le fascinante histoire des hydravions de Dimitry Grigorovitch" [The Fascinating History of the Seaplanes of Dimitry Grigorovitch]. Avions: Toute l'aéronautique et son histoire (in French) (45): 20–33. ISSN 1243-8650.
