= Grigorovich E-2 =

Soviet prototype sport aircraft

Grigorovich E-2 (DG-55)

General information
- Type: Sport aircraft
- Manufacturer: Grigorovich
- Number built: 1

History
- First flight: 1935
- Developed from: De Havilland DH.88 Comet

The Grigorovich E-2, or DG-55 (Russian Григорович Э-2, ДГ-55), was a two-seat, twin-engined, low-wing, prototype sport aircraft of Soviet origin.

== Design and construction ==
Inspired by the de Havilland DH.88 Comet racer which had won the MacRobertson Air Race in 1934, the Grigorovich OKB began work on a similar aircraft. Like the DH.88, the Russian "Kometa" was a highly streamlined conventional low-wing monoplane with twin engines forward of retractable main undercarriage in nacelles under each wing. Built of wood, it also featured an enclosed cockpit and landing flaps.

Intended to be a lightweight, high-speed sport aircraft the DG-55, later designated the E-2, was slightly smaller than the DH.88 and with less powerful engines, using the 120 hp (89 kW) Cirrus Hermes.

Only one prototype was constructed, flying in 1935.

== Operational history ==
Following completion of its flight tests, the E-2 Kometa was handed over to the OSOAVIAKhIM paramilitary sports organisation, who used it for light liaison duties.

== Specifications ==
Data from The Osprey Encyclopedia of Russian Aircraft 1875–1995

General characteristics

- Crew: 2
- Length: 7.9 m (25 ft 11 in)
- Wingspan: 11.0 m (36 ft 1 in)
- Wing area: 13.8 m^{2} (149 sq ft)
- Empty weight: 1,051 kg (2,317 lb)
- Gross weight: 1,546 kg (3,408 lb)
- Powerplant: 2 × Cirrus Hermes inverted air-cooled 4-cylinder inline engines, 89 kW (120 hp) each

Performance

- Maximum speed: 296 km/h (184 mph, 160 kn)
- Range: 2,200 km (1,400 mi, 1,200 nmi)
- Service ceiling: 5,000 m (16,000 ft)
