= Grigorovich M-15 =

1916 reconnaissance flying boat

M-15
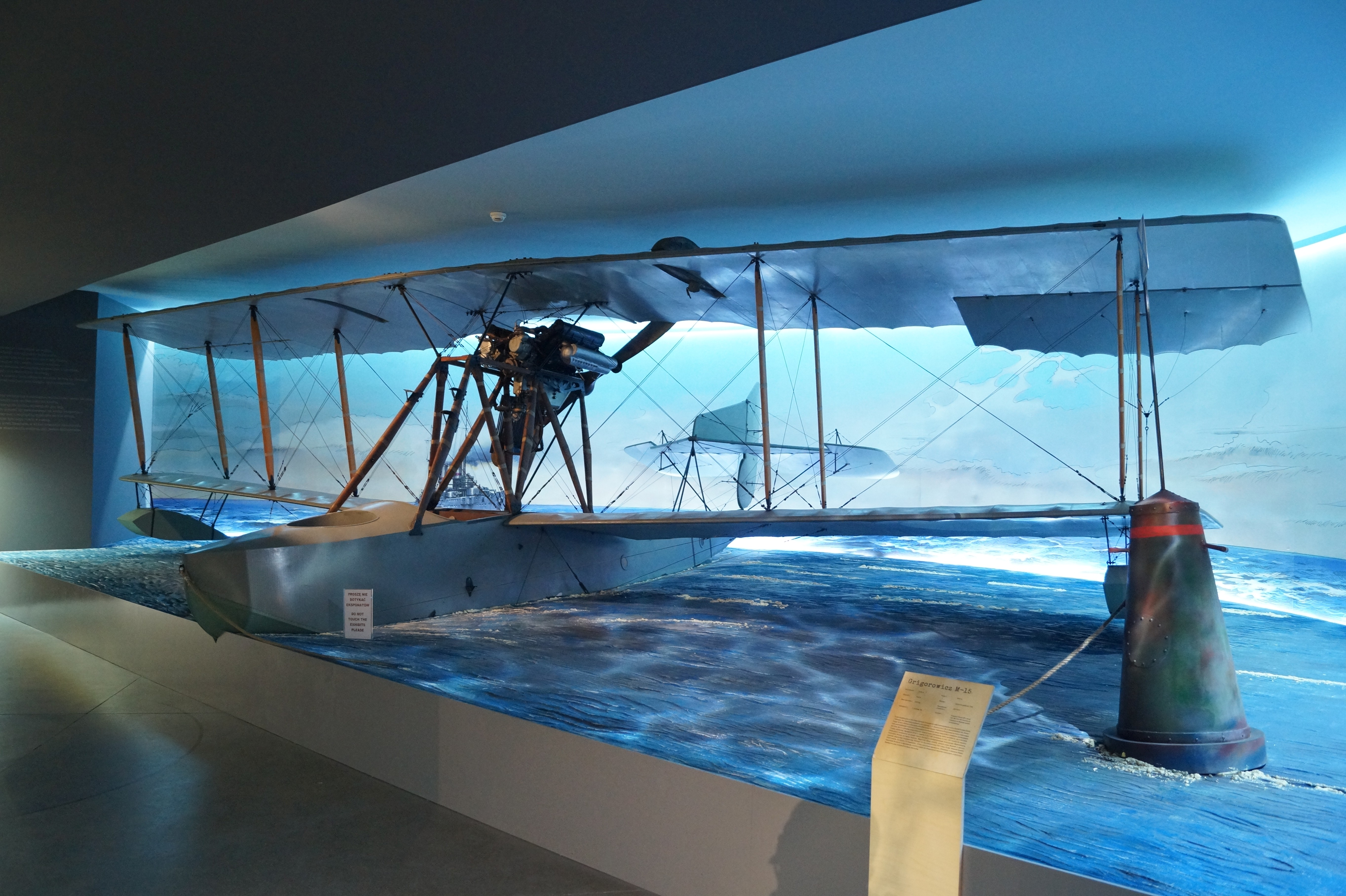
- Sole surviving Grigorovich M-15 on display in the Polish Aviation Museum in Kraków

General information
- Type: Reconnaissance flying boat
- Manufacturer: Shchetinin
- Designer: Dmitri Grigorovich
- Primary users: Imperial Russian Navy Finnish Air Force
- Number built: 80 planned

History
- First flight: May 1916
- Retired: 1920s
- Developed from: Grigorovich M-9

Grigorovich M-15 (alternative designation ShCh M-15 (Russian: Щ М-15), sometimes also Shchetinin M-15) was a successful Russian World War I-era biplane flying boat, developed from the M-9 by Grigorovich.

== Development ==
The M-15 was a smaller version of the M-9 intended to replace the latter, however it was only built in small numbers due to shortage of the more powerful Hispano-Suiza engines. After the summer of 1917 it was mostly used as a trainer.

Two M-15s fell into Finnish hands during the Russian Civil War, having been left at Åland and Turku. The Russian officer J.Herbert flew the Åland aircraft to mainland Finland and was awarded an officer's title in the Finnish Air Force. Only the Åland aircraft was in flyworthy condition. The aircraft was flown until 1919.

== Variants ==
M-15
Reconnaissance / skiplane powered by 140 hp (100 kW) Hispano-Suiza 8A engines.
M-17
the second prototype powered by a 130 hp (97 kW) Clerget 9B engine.
M-18
powered by a 200 hp (150 kW) Hispano-Suiza 8B engine.

== Operators ==
Finland

- Finnish Air Force

Russia

- Imperial Russian Navy

Soviet Union

- Soviet Naval Aviation

== Specifications (M-15) ==
Data from Aircraft of the Soviet Union : the encyclopaedia of Soviet aircraft since 1917

General characteristics

- Crew: 2
- Length: 8.4 m (27 ft 7 in)
- Wingspan: 11.9 m (39 ft 1 in)
- Wing area: 34.4 m^{2} (370 sq ft)
- Empty weight: 840 kg (1,852 lb)
- Gross weight: 1,320 kg (2,910 lb)
- Powerplant: 1 × Hispano-Suiza 8A V-8water-cooled piston engine, 100 kW (140 hp)
- Propellers: 2-bladed fixed-pitch wooden pusher propeller

Performance

- Maximum speed: 125 km/h (78 mph, 67 kn)
- Endurance: 5 hours 30 minutes
- Service ceiling: 3,500 m (11,500 ft)
- Time to altitude: 1,000 m (3,300 ft) in 8 minutes 30 seconds

Armament

- Guns: 1 x machine gun

== Bibliography ==
- Kulikov, Victor (December 1996). "Le fascinante histoire des hydravions de Dimitry Grigorovitch" [The Fascinating History of the Seaplanes of Dimitry Grigorovitch]. Avions: Toute l'aéronautique et son histoire (in French) (45): 20–33. ISSN 1243-8650.
