= Grigorovich I-2 =

I-2

General information
- Type: Fighter
- Designer: Grigorovich
- Primary user: Soviet Air Forces

History
- First flight: 4 November 1924
- Developed from: Grigorovich I-1

The Grigorovich I-2 was a biplane fighter aircraft of the Soviet Union, the first indigenous fighter to enter service in substantial numbers.

The I-2 was developed from the prototype Grigorovich I-1. Construction of the initial aircraft was started on February 1, 1924 and finished September 6, 1924, with A.I.Zhukov as the test pilot on the maiden flight on 4 November 1924. The aircraft was fitted with a 400 hp Mikulin M-5 and was found to be 20 km/h faster than the I-1 with improved engine cooling. Zhukov noted that the I-2 handled well, easy to land, and required a short runway for takeoff. After improvements to load-bearing surfaces, steering, and other control systems, Zhukov noted that at low throttle it suffered from random nose lift and had a tendency to dive when accelerating. He refused to continue testing after the sixth flight. The I-2 was produced at the Dux Factory, with 52 aircraft completed before being supplanted by the I-2bis model. These aircraft entered service with the flight school at Borisoglebsk (air base) in 1929.

Pilots M. M. Gromov and V. N. Filippov flew the I-2 on 19 November 1924 and did not note these same tendencies to nose lift or dive. They did, however, complain about the cramped cockpit as they were of average height and thus taller than Zhukov. Complaints also included the difficulty of entering and exiting the cockpit, the restricted view, and the location of the control pedals and weapon controls. As a result the I-2 was redesigned at the Aviation Repair Plant No.3. The seat height was increased, cockpit opening enlarged, and a different engine cowling was installed. The central and front fuselage now incorporated welded steel frame for strength, as well as an improved 420 hp engine. Due to these modifications the aircraft was given the new designation of I-2bis.

Pilots of the I-2bis noted several issues, including landing gear failures, clogged radiators, tight controls, and a tendency for the nose to lift on accelerating. As the Polikarpov I-3 was still in development, the decision was made to continue with production. The first two production I-2bis were assigned to the 15th aviation brigade in Bryansk in middle of 1928, with the number increased to 10 by the end of 1928. In 1929 a report stated that the bis had heavy and inert controls, a steady dive, and significant slippage when landing. They also complained that the cockpit visor was too small for the cutout. By the end of 1929 209-211 I-2 & I2-bis aircraft were produced, with the last plane delivered in May 1931.

A number of aircraft, including I-2bis models, were sold to Iran in 1928. Eight of the I-2bis (2116-2123) were armed with Vickers machine guns and larger radiators. What happened to those aircraft remains unknown. Due to the increased cooling issues with the I-2bis model, some aircraft were equipped with Lamblin radiators. These were given an unofficial designation of I-2', but this decreased performance even further. An experimental model of the I-2bis with a 450 hp Lorraine-Dietrich engine was rejected due to the size of the engine's cross-section.

== Operators ==
Soviet Union

- Soviet Air Forces

== Specifications (I-2bis) ==
Data from

General characteristics

- Crew: 1
- Length: 7.32 m (24 ft 0 in)
- Wingspan: 10.8 m (35 ft 5 in)
- Height: 3 m (9 ft 10 in)
- Wing area: 23.4 m^{2} (252 sq ft)
- Empty weight: 1,152 kg (2,540 lb)
- Gross weight: 1,575 kg (3,472 lb)
- Powerplant: 1 × Mikulin M-5 V-12 water-cooled piston engine, 313 kW (420 hp)
- Propellers: 2-bladed fixed-pitch propeller

Performance

- Maximum speed: 235 km/h (146 mph, 127 kn)
- Range: 600 km (370 mi, 320 nmi)
- Service ceiling: 5,340 m (17,520 ft)
- Rate of climb: 7 m/s (1,400 ft/min)
- Wing loading: 67 kg/m^{2} (14 lb/sq ft)
- Power/mass: 0.19 kW/kg (0.12 hp/lb)

Armament

- Guns: 2 × 7.62 mm PV-1 machine guns

== See also ==
Related development

- Grigorovich I-1

Related lists

- List of interwar military aircraft
- List of military aircraft of the Soviet Union and the CIS
- List of fighter aircraft
