= Grigorovich ROM-1 =

1920s Soviet aircraft

ROM-1

General information
- Type: Reconnaissance flying boat
- Designer: Dmitry Pavlovich Grigorovich
- Primary user: Soviet Navy
- Number built: 1

History
- First flight: 1927
- Variant: Grigorovich ROM-2

The Grigorovich ROM-1 was a long-range reconnaissance flying boat designed by the Grigorovich Design Bureau for the Soviet Navy in the late 1920s.

== Design ==
The ROM-1 (ROM = Razviedchik Otkrytovo Morya [Open Sea Reconnaissance]) was a long range maritime reconnaissance sesquiplane flying boat with two engines installed in a tandem nacelle, supported on struts over the hull. The hull was made from aluminumand the wings were made of wood, attached to the sides of the engine nacelle. The water-tight lower wings, attached to the sides of the hull, were installed slightly above the waterline and carried two floats on their tips. The tail surfaces had aluminum alloy frames with fabric covering.

Development of the ROM-1 commenced in the summer of 1925. V.B.Shavrov was responsible for hull design, and P.D.Samsonov was responsible for the wing and powerplant. The ROM-1 first flew in the autumn of 1927, with test flying concluding in 1929, when the Soviet Navy judged it unsuitable for use as in combat.

== Specifications ==
Data from , Aircraft of the Soviet Union : the encyclopaedia of Soviet aircraft since 1917

General characteristics

- Crew: 4
- Length: 16.0 m (52 ft 6 in)
- Wingspan: 28.0 m (91 ft 10 in)
- Wing area: 104.6 m^{2} (1,126 sq ft)
- Empty weight: 4,518 kg (9,960 lb)
- Max takeoff weight: 5,830 kg (12,853 lb)
- Powerplant: 2 × Lorraine-Dietrich 12E W-12 water-cooled piston engine, 340 kW (450 hp) each

Performance

- Maximum speed: 165 km/h (103 mph, 89 kn)
- Range: 800 km (500 mi, 430 nmi)
- Endurance: 5 hours
- Service ceiling: 3,470 m (11,380 ft)
- Time to altitude: 1,000 m (3,281 ft) in 10 minutes 6 seconds
- Wing loading: 56.0 kg/m^{2} (11.5 lb/sq ft)

Armament

- Guns: 4 x 7.62 mm (0.300 in) DA machine guns in TUR-4 bow and TUR-5 dorsal gun cockpits
- Bombs: carried under lowerwing

== Bibliography ==
- Kulikov, Victor (December 1996). "Le fascinante histoire des hydravions de Dimitry Grigorovitch" [The Fascinating History of the Seaplanes of Dimitry Grigorovitch]. Avions: Toute l'aéronautique et son histoire (in French) (45): 20–33. ISSN 1243-8650.
