= Grigorovich MR-2 =

1920s Soviet reconnaissance flying boat

MR-2

General information
- Type: Reconnaissance flying boat
- Designer: Dmitry Pavlovich Grigorovich
- Primary user: Soviet Navy
- Number built: 1

History
- First flight: 23 September 1926

The Grigorovich MR-2 was a long-range reconnaissance flying boat designed by the Grigorovich Design Bureau for the Soviet Navy in the late 1920s.

== Design ==
The MR-2 was similar to the MRL-1 but had a more powerful engine and larger upper wing, while the hull design was improved and less expensive materials used in its construction. Flights beginning in September 1926 impressed the MR-2's designers, and state acceptance trials were carried out by VVS pilot F.S.Rastegaev. One flight on October 19, however, ended in disaster when the MR-2 lost stability, and longitudinal oscillations with increasing amplitude resulted in steep dive, causing the aircraft to crash into the water up-side-down.

== Specifications ==
Data from

General characteristics

- Crew: 2
- Length: 13.6 m (44 ft 7 in)
- Wingspan: 15.6 m (51 ft 2 in)
- Wing area: 56.7 m^{2} (610 sq ft)
- Empty weight: 1,770 kg (3,902 lb)
- Gross weight: 2,770 kg (6,107 lb)
- Powerplant: 1 × Lorraine-Dietrich 12E W-12 water-cooled piston engine, 340 kW (450 hp)

Performance

- Maximum speed: 179 km/h (111 mph, 97 kn)
- Endurance: 5 hours
- Service ceiling: 4,200 m (13,800 ft)
- Time to altitude: 1,000 m (3,281 ft) in 7.0 minutes
- Wing loading: 49.0 kg/m^{2} (10.0 lb/sq ft)

Armament

- Guns: 1-2 x machine guns

== Bibliography ==
- Kulikov, Victor (December 1996). "Le fascinante histoire des hydravions de Dimitry Grigorovitch" [The Fascinating History of the Seaplanes of Dimitry Grigorovitch]. Avions: Toute l'aéronautique et son histoire (in French) (45): 20–33. ISSN 1243-8650.
