= Grigorovich M-1 =

General information
- Type: Flying boat
- National origin: Russia
- Designer: Dmitry Pavlovich Grigorovich
- Number built: 1

History
- First flight: Autumn 1913
- Developed from: 1912 Donnet Lévêque

The Grigorovich M-1 (Григорович М-1 in russian) was a single engined flying boat designed by Dmitry Pavlovich Grigorovich and built in Russia in 1913.

== Development ==
The Grigorovich M-1 is a single-engine flying boat of Russian origin. It is essentially similar to the French Donnet-Lévêcque built in 1912. The two-seater aircraft was of mixed construction, with pilots seated side by side. It was powered by a Gnome engine driving a wooden pusher propeller. Support floats at the end of the lower wing stabilized the aircraft in the water. The aircraft was fitted with attachment points for a dolly to bring the aircraft in and out of the water.

Dmitry Grigorovich shortened the nose by about one meter compared to the original, altered the wing profile (Farman F.16), and reduced the hull step of 200 mm to 80 mm. The aircraft first flew in autumn 1913 and fulfilled the expectations through improved handling.

== Technical data ==
property	data
Crew	2
Length	7.4 m
Wingspan	9.5 m
Wing area	18.2 m²
Empty weight	420 kg
Starting mass	620 kg
Engine	1 Gnome rotary engine 37 kW (50 hp)

== Bibliography ==
- Gunston, Bill. The Osprey Encyclopedia of Russian Aircraft 1875-1995. London: Osprey, 1995. ISBN 1-85532-405-9.
- Kulikov, Victor (December 1996). "Le fascinante histoire des hydravions de Dimitry Grigorovitch" [The Fascinating History of the Seaplanes of Dimitry Grigorovitch]. Avions: Toute l'aéronautique et son histoire (in French) (45): 20–33. ISSN 1243-8650.
