= Leonid Kurchevsky =

Soviet weaponry designer (1890–1937)

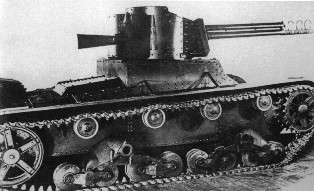
Twin-turreted T-26 light tank armed with the 76.2 mm recoilless gun designed by Kurchevsky in the right turret. 1934.

Leonid Vasilyevich Kurchevsky (Russian: Леонид Васильевич Курчевский) (September 22, 1890, Pereslavl-Zalessky – November 26, 1937 (January 12, 1939?)) was a Russian/Soviet weapons designer.

Kurchevsky was born into a family of a drawing teacher in Pereslavl-Zalessky. He was a student at the Department of Physics and Mathematics of the Moscow State University for two years. In 1916–1918, Kurchevsky headed the design bureau of the Moscow Defense Industry Committee (Конструкторское бюро Московского военно-промышленного комитета, (Konstruktorskoye byuro Moskovskogo voyenno-promyshlennogo komiteta). In 1918–20, he was put in charge of a laboratory of the VSNKh Inventions Committee. In 1921–22, Kurchevsky served at the Acoustical Intelligence Commission. In 1922–24, he headed the workshop/motor vehicle lab of the same Inventions Committee.

Kurchevsky is known for his work in the field of recoilless guns, which he began in 1923. In 1924, he was sentenced to 10 years of imprisonment for an alleged embezzlement of state property and funds, used to construct a helicopter. Kurchevsky served half of his term at the Solovki prison camp. While imprisoned, Leonid Kurchevsky continued his inventive work and designed a development model of his recoilless gun. He was released from prison in the early 1929. In January 1930, Kurchevsky was appointed chief designer at the Experimental Design Bureau #1 of the Chief Directorate of Artillery (Опытно-конструкторское бюро - 1 Главного Артиллерийского Управления, ОКБ-1 ГАУ, Opytno-konstruktorskoye byuro - 1 Glavnogo Artilleriyskogo Upravleniya, OKB-1-GAU). In early 1934, they organized Special Projects Commissary Directorate (Управление уполномоченного по специальным работам, Upravleniye upolnomochennogo po spetsial'nym rabotam) especially for Kurchevsky. Leonid Kurchevsky and his team designed a score of recoilless guns (динамореактивная пушка, ДPП, dinamoreaktivnaya pushka, DRP) with calibers ranging from 37mm to 420mm, including the so-called 76mm battalion gun (батальонная пушка, БПК, batalyónnaya pushka, BPK), aircraft recoilless gun (авиационная пушка, АПК, aviatsionnaya pushka, APK), etc. The 76.2 mm APK was fitted to the Grigorovich I-Z fighter.

In his experiments with recoilless guns, Leonid Kurchevsky strived to cover a wide range of artillery weapons. Besides their work on field artillery, his team also mounted DRPs on a Grigorovich I-Z fighter armed with 2x 76 mm (2.99 in) APK recoilless guns (1935), mounted a 305mm howitzer on an automobile, a 305mm recoilless gun on a destroyer, a 152mm recoilless gun on a torpedo boat, etc. Kurchevsky enjoyed the support of Mikhail Tukhachevsky and Sergo Ordzhonikidze in promoting his projects. Among his other inventions were a prototype of a grenade launcher, an all-terrain motor boat for polar conditions, a three-axis all-terrain wheeled and tracked vehicle, a winged torpedo, and a special hydroplane.

Most of Kurchevsky's experimental guns had too many irreparable defects and their technical specifications did not correspond to those declared. In 1937, Kurchevsky was arrested, charged with designing poor weapons systems at the Tukhachevsky Case, and sentenced to death on November 25, 1937. The exact date of his execution is still uncertain: various sources claim it to be either November 26, 1937 or January 12, 1939. In the late 1930s, Kurchevsky's recoilless guns were removed from operational status and almost all were destroyed. His gun systems were never used in the Great Patriotic War and all work on recoilless artillery in the USSR was stalled for a long time to come.

Leonid Kurchevsky was rehabilitated posthumously in 1956.

== Gallery ==
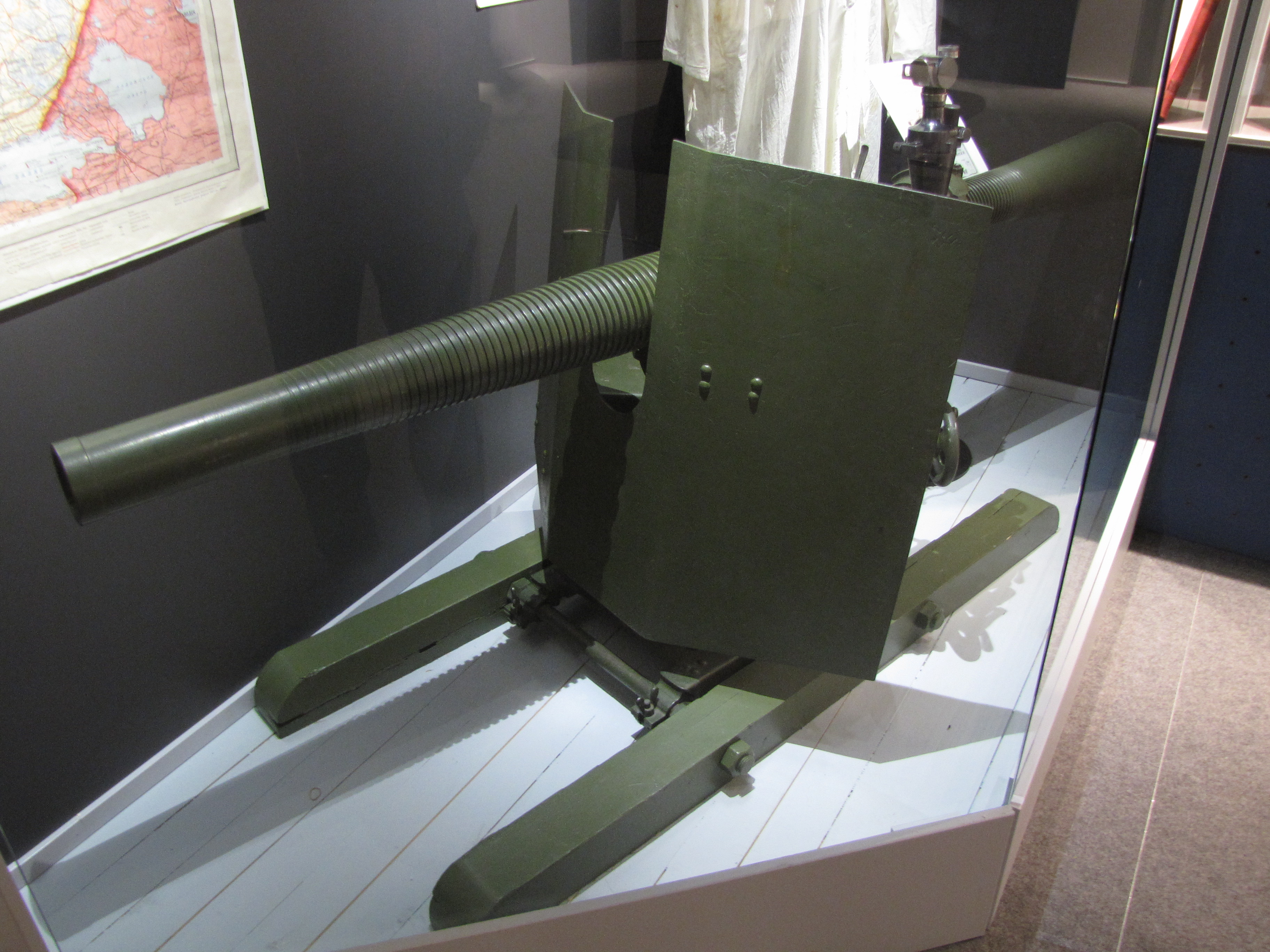
76mm DRP recoilless gun

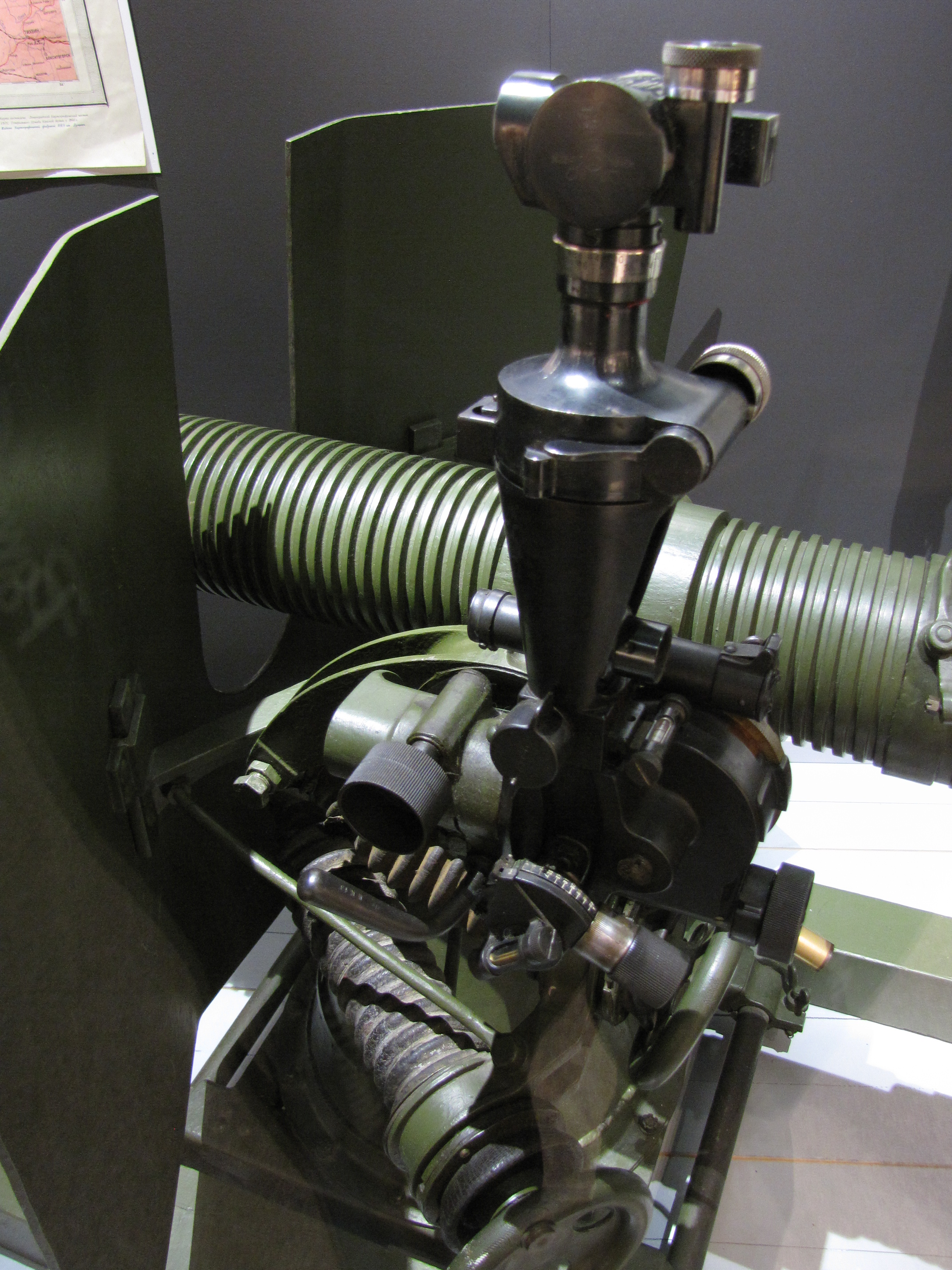
76mm DRP recoilless gun sights
