= Czesław Centkiewicz =

Polish engineer, explorer, writer and journalist

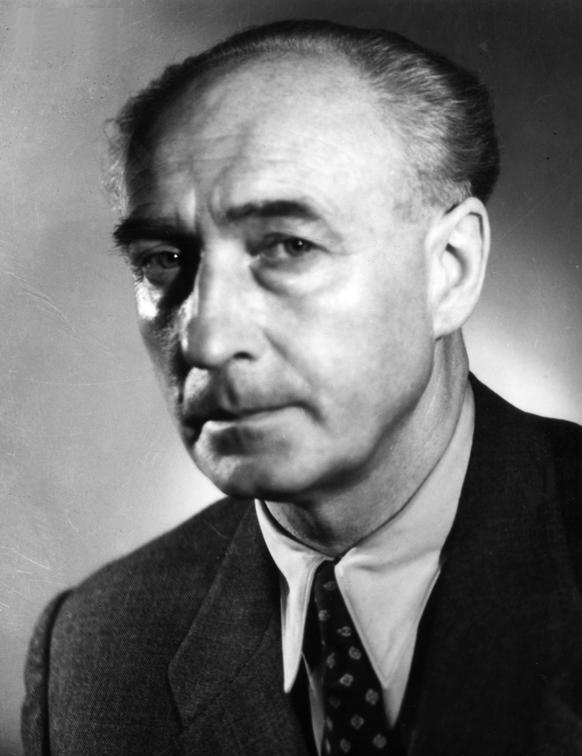

Czesław Jacek Centkiewicz (October 18, 1904 – July 10, 1996) was a Polish engineer, explorer, writer and journalist. He is best known for a number of books he authored (or co-authored with his wife Alina Centkiewicz) on history of exploration of polar areas and the daily life of Inuit.

== Biography ==
Czesław Jacek Centkiewicz was born on October 18, 1904, in Warsaw to Stanisław and Stanisława née Bresteczer. In 1924, he graduated from Saint Kazimierz Gymnasium and then the University of Liège in Belgium. An engineer by trade, until World War II he worked at the State Meteorological Institute in Warsaw. With that institution, he organised and led the first Polish expedition to the Bear Island in 1932. Soon afterwards he also published his first books: an account of saving the SS Chelyuskin's crew (1934) and a reportage on Anaruk, a young Eskimo boy (1937).

During World War II he remained in Warsaw and after the Warsaw Uprising of 1944 he was arrested by the Germans and deported to the Neuengamme concentration camp. After the war he became a director of a large power plant cluster in Lower Silesia (in Jelenia Góra) and at the State Hydrological-Meteorological Institute. In 1950, he returned to Warsaw where he continued to promote the exploration of polar areas and published numerous books on that topic. During one of his lectures on polar exploration, he "re-discovered" Jan Nagórski, a Polish polar explorer who had been presumed dead since 1917. Most of his books were co-authored by his wife Alina. He died on July 10, 1996, in Warsaw, and was buried at the Wólka Węglowa cemetery in Warsaw.

As many of his books were targeted at younger readers, in 1970 he received the Order of the Smile. He was also awarded with numerous state medals. His Anaruk, chłopiec z Grenlandii (Anaruk, a boy from Greenland) remains an obligatory book for children in Polish schools.
