= Grigorovich I-Z =

Fighter aircraft developed in the Soviet Union during the 1930s

I-Z

General information
- Type: Fighter
- National origin: Soviet Union
- Manufacturer: Grigorovich
- Primary user: Soviet Air Force
- Number built: 73

History
- First flight: 1931

The Grigorovich I-Z was a fighter aircraft developed in the Soviet Union during the 1930s. Advances in aircraft survivability thanks to all-metal construction and self-sealing and inert gas-filled fuel tanks led to experimentation with large-caliber weapons to shoot them down. In Soviet Union, Leonid Kurchevsky developed a series of recoilless rifles in various calibers and in 1930 was decided to adapt the 76.2 mm (3 in) weapons for aircraft use.

== Design and development ==
The Grigorovich I-Z was a conventional strut-braced monoplane with fixed landing gear. A pair of Kurchevsky APK (APK - Aviatsionnaya Pushka Kurchevsky - aircraft cannon Kurchevsky) rifles were mounted under the wings outside the propeller arc and the rear fuselage and tail assembly were of reinforced metal construction to withstand the blast. A single small-caliber synchronized machine gun in the left fuselage was added to aid the pilot in aiming.

The project began in 1930. Two prototypes were built, the first flying in mid-1931. The second strengthened I-Zbis flew at the beginning of the following year. These were followed by 21 examples fitted with the Shvetsov M-22 ordered as evaluation aircraft and 50 production machines. By the time this last batch was being delivered, however, it was already apparent that the concept of a "single-shot" fighter was flawed and the I-Zs that had been built were relegated to various testing roles. One such role was as a parasite fighter in the Zveno project.

== Operators ==
Soviet Union

- Soviet Air Force

== Specifications (I-Z) ==
Data from Istoriia konstruktskii samoletov v SSSR do 1938

General characteristics

- Crew: 1
- Length: 7.65 m (25 ft 1 in)
- Wingspan: 11.5 m (37 ft 9 in)
- Wing area: 19.5 m^{2} (210 sq ft)
- Airfoil: Göttingen 436
- Empty weight: 1,180 kg (2,601 lb)
- Gross weight: 1,648 kg (3,633 lb)
- Powerplant: 1 × Shvetsov M-22 9-cylinder air-cooled radial piston engine, 358 kW (480 hp)
- Propellers: 2-bladed fixed-pitch propeller

Performance

- Maximum speed: 259 km/h (161 mph, 140 kn)
- Range: 600 km (370 mi, 320 nmi)
- Service ceiling: 7,000 m (23,000 ft)
- Time to altitude: 5,000 m (16,000 ft) in 14 minutes
- Wing loading: 85 kg/m^{2} (17 lb/sq ft)
- Power/mass: 0.22 kW/kg (0.13 hp/lb)
- Horizontal turn time: 17 seconds

Armament

- Guns:

- 1×7.62 mm (0.3 in) PV-1 machine gun
- 2×76.2 mm (3 in) single-shot Kurchevsky APK recoilless rifles

== See also ==
Aircraft of comparable role, configuration, and era

- Tupolev I-12

Related lists

- List of Interwar military aircraft

== Bibliography ==
- Lesnitchenko, Vladimir (November–December 1999). "Combat Composites: Soviet Use of 'Mother-ships' to Carry Fighters, 1939–1941". Air Enthusiast (84): 4–21. ISSN 0143-5450.
