= Grigorovich MUR-1 =

Soviet flying boat

General information
- Type: Trainer flying boat
- Manufacturer: Dmitri Pavlovich Grigorovich
- Number built: 1

History
- First flight: 1926
- Developed from: Grigorovich M-5 / Grigorovich M-20

The Grigorovich MUR-1 (MUR - Morskoi Uchebnyi Rhône - seaplane trainer Rhône) was a trainer flying boat built in the Soviet Union in the mid-1920s.

== Development ==
The MUR-1 was developed by the Grigorovich Design Bureau in response to a Red Air Force requirement for a flying boat suited to training naval pilots. The MUR-1 differed from the Grigorovich M-5 in that it used a more powerful engine, single bay wings with thicker section, and stronger tail structure. Speed was increased, but other characteristics suffered. Increased weight of the tail structure necessitated carrying 32 kg (71 lb) of ballast in the nose. Test flights of the MUR-1 showed no discernable improvement over the M-5.

To remedy aerodynamics deficiencies during its initial flight trials, the MUR-1 was modified with pressure sensors and a new hull, and redesignated MUR-2, with input from TsAGI engineer N.N.Podsevalov. Test flights were conducted 1929-1931 with the intent to test load condition during taxi, takeoff and landing.

== Specifications ==
Data from The Osprey Encyclopedia of Russian Aircraft 1875–1995

General characteristics

- Crew: two
- Length: 8.0 m (26 ft 3 in)
- Wingspan: 11.5 m (37 ft 9 in)
- Wing area: 33.0 m^{2} (355 sq ft)
- Empty weight: 700 kg (1,543 lb)
- Gross weight: 1,000 kg (2,205 lb)
- Fuel capacity: 124 kg (273 lb)
- Powerplant: 1 × Le Rhône M-2 9-cylinder air-cooled rotary piston engine, 89 kW (120 hp)
- Propellers: 2-bladed fixed-pitch wooden propeller

Performance

- Maximum speed: 129 km/h (80 mph, 70 kn) at sea level
- Alighting speed: 95 km/h (59 mph; 51 kn)
- Range: 360 km (220 mi, 190 nmi)
- Endurance: 3 hours
- Service ceiling: 3,500 m (11,500 ft)
- Time to altitude: 1,000 m (3,300 ft) 8 minutes

2,000 m (6,600 ft) 19 minutes
3,000 m (9,800 ft) 38 minutes

- Wing loading: 33.3 kg/m^{2} (6.8 lb/sq ft)
- Take-off distance: 250 m (820 ft) / 22 seconds
- Alighting distance: 170 m (560 ft) / 15 seconds
