= Grigorovich M-9 =

1916 flying boat model by Grigorovich

M-9
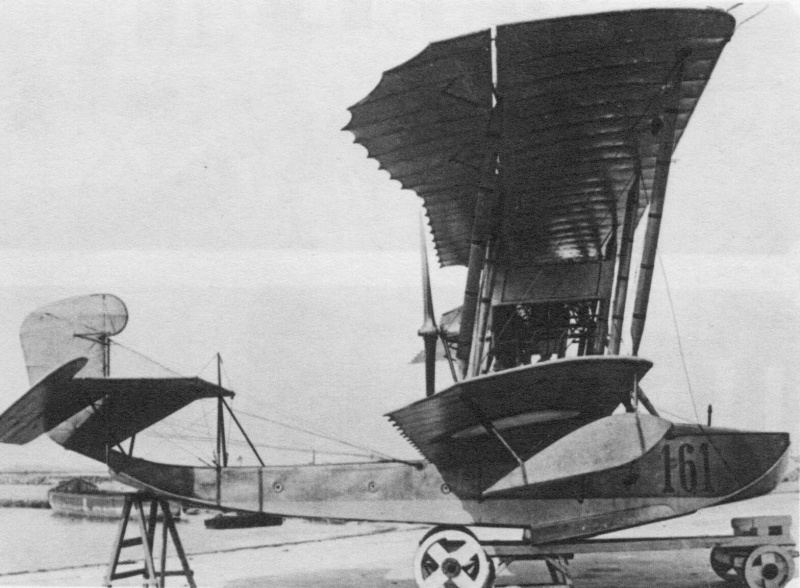
- Grigorovich M-9

General information
- Type: Reconnaissance flying boat
- Manufacturer: Shchetinin
- Designer: Dmitry Pavlovich Grigorovich
- Primary users: Imperial Russian Navy Finnish Air Force
- Number built: ca 500

History
- First flight: January 9, 1916
- Retired: 1920s
- Developed from: Grigorovich M-5

The Grigorovich M-9 (alternative designation ShCh M-9, sometimes also Shchetinin M-9) was a Russian World War I-era biplane flying boat, developed from the M-5 by Grigorovich.

The first M-9 was ready in 1915 and its maiden flight was carried out on January 9, 1916, at Baku. On September 17, 1916, the test pilot Jan Nagórski became the first to make a loop with a flying boat.

During the Russian Civil War, M-9s participated in the air defence of Baku, dropping approximately 6,000 kg of bombs and 160 kg of flechettes. The aircraft also carried out photo reconnaissance, artillery spotting and air combat sorties.

The M-9 was also used for the first experiments on sea shelve study, participating in the finding of new oil fields near Baku.

Nine M-9s were captured by Finland during the Russian Civil War. One was flown by a Russian officer to Antrea on April 10, 1918. It sank the following day during type evaluation. Eight more were taken over at the airfields at Åland and Turku. The aircraft were used until 1922 by the Finnish Air Force.

== Operators ==
Russia

- Imperial Russian Air Service
- White Army

Finland

- Finnish Air Force

Soviet Union

- Soviet Air Force

== Specifications (M-9) ==
Data from Thulinista Hornetiin – 75 vuotta Suomen ilmavoimien lentokoneita, Grigorovich Flying Boats

General characteristics

- Crew: 2
- Capacity: 1
- Length: 9 m (29 ft 6 in)
- Wingspan: 16 m (52 ft 6 in)
- Wing area: 54.8 m^{2} (590 sq ft)
- Empty weight: 1,060 kg (2,337 lb)
- Gross weight: 1,540 kg (3,395 lb)
- Max takeoff weight: 1,610 kg (3,549 lb)
- Powerplant: 1 × Salmson P9 9-cylinder water-cooled radial piston engine, 110 kW (150 hp)
- Propellers: 2-bladed fixed-pitch pusher propeller

Performance

- Maximum speed: 110 km/h (68 mph, 59 kn)
- Endurance: 3 hours 30 minutes
- Time to altitude:

1,000 m (3,300 ft) in 12 minutes
2,000 m (6,600 ft) in 30 minutes

Armament

- Guns:

- 1 × 7.7 mm MG

or

- 1x 7.5 mm MG

or

- 1x 20 mm cannon

or

- 1x 37 mm Hotchkiss cannon

== See also ==
Related lists

- List of military aircraft of Finland
- List of flying boats and floatplanes

== Bibliography ==
- Kulikov, Victor (December 1996). "Le fascinante histoire des hydravions de Dimitry Grigorovitch" [The Fascinating History of the Seaplanes of Dimitry Grigorovitch]. Avions: Toute l'aéronautique et son histoire (in French) (45): 20–33. ISSN 1243-8650.
