= Dmitry Grigorovich (engineer) =

Ukrainian aircraft designer (1883–1938)

- Дмитрий Григорович; Дмитро Григорович
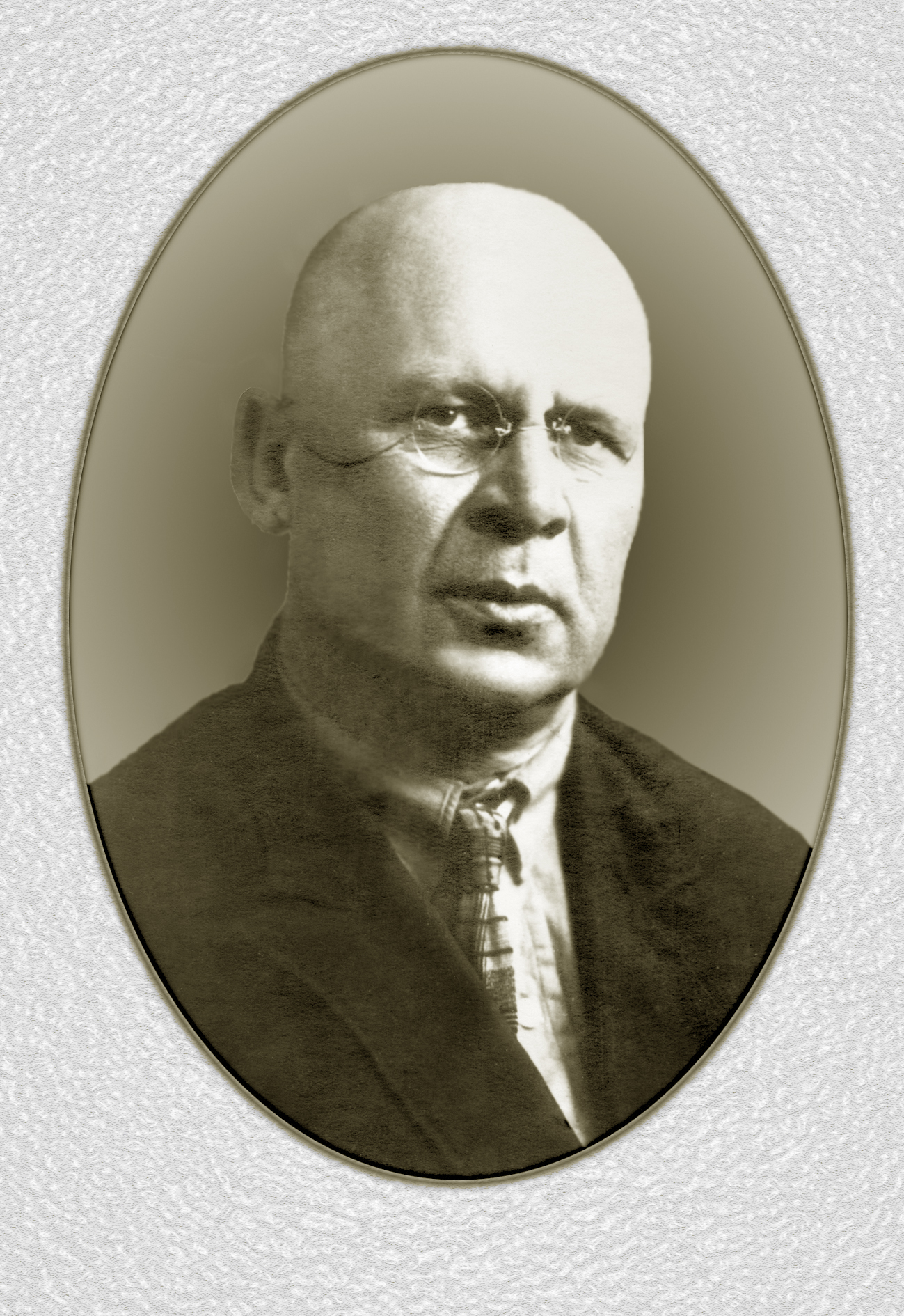
- Born: January 25, 1883. Kiev, Kiev Governorate, Russian Empire (modern-day Ukraine)
- Died: July 26, 1938 (aged 55); Moscow, Russian SFSR, Soviet Union
- Occupation: Aircraft designer
- Years active: 1912-1938

Dmitry Pavlovich Grigorovich (Ukrainian: Дмитро Павлович Григорович, Russian: Дмитрий Павлович Григорович) (born in Kiev, Russian Empire, now Ukraine, 25 January (6 February) 1883 – 26 July 1938 in Moscow) was a Ukrainian, Russian, and Soviet aircraft designer of a number of planes under the Grigorovich name. He died in 1938 from cancer.

== Aircraft ==
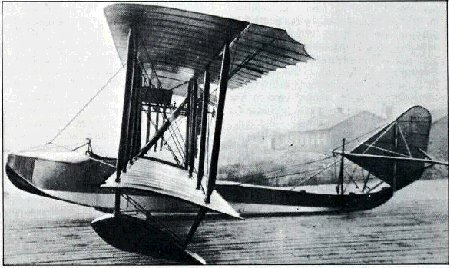
Grigorovich M-5

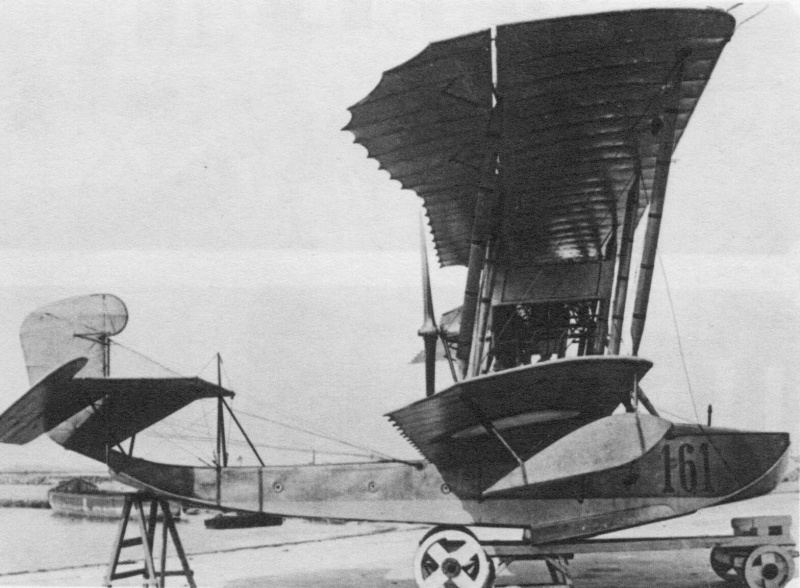
Grigorovič M-9

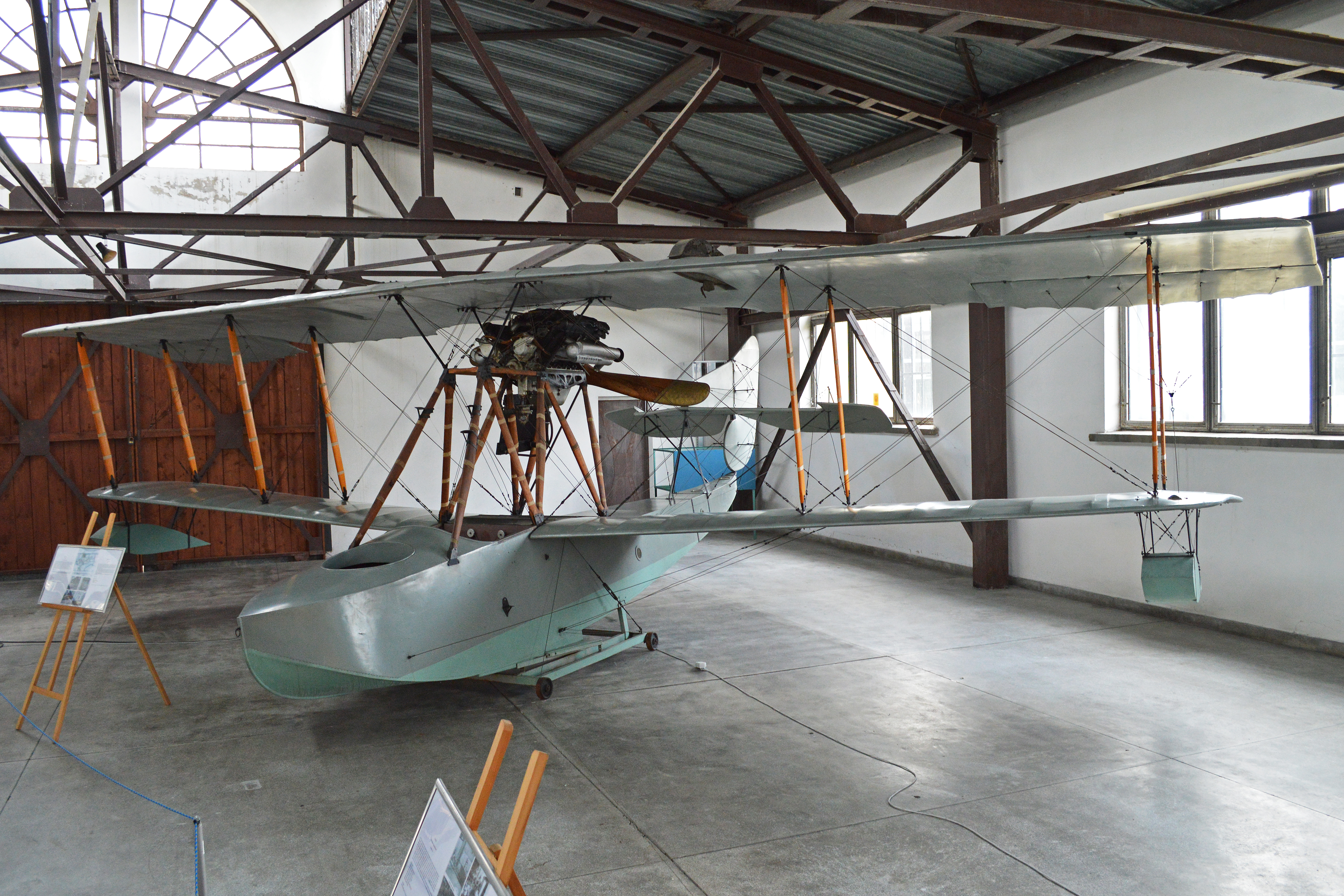
Grigorovich M-15

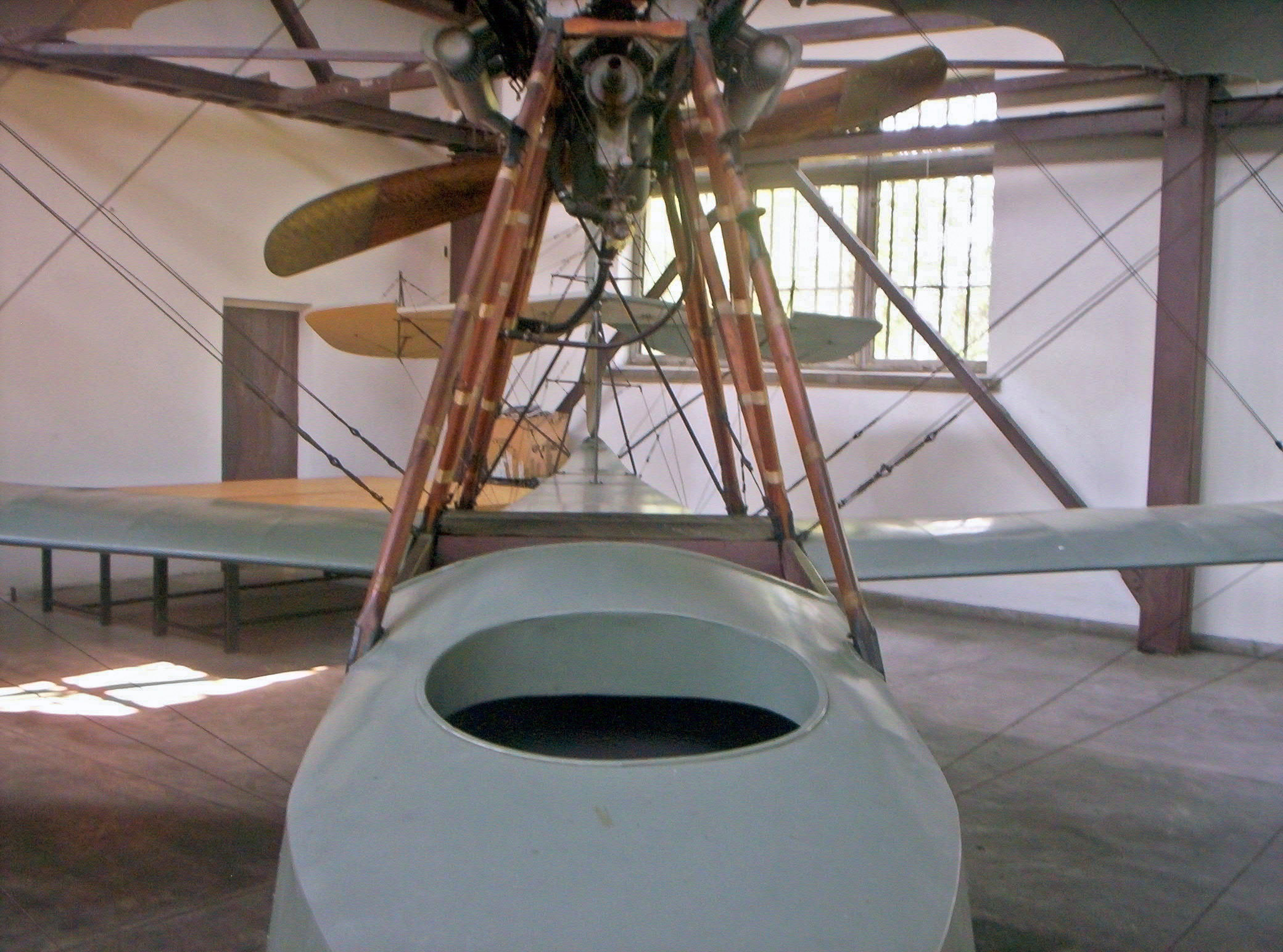
Grigorovich M-15

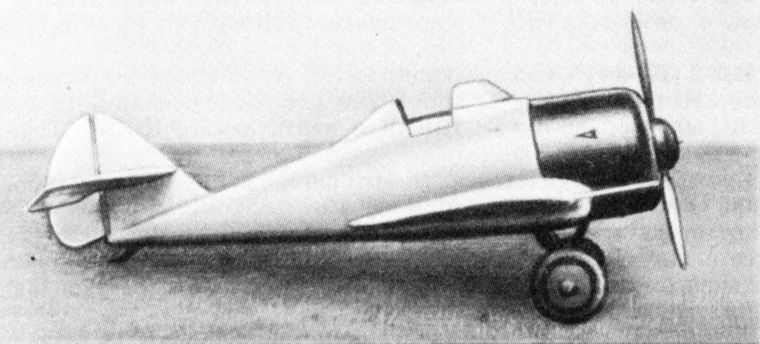
Grigorovich DG-52-1

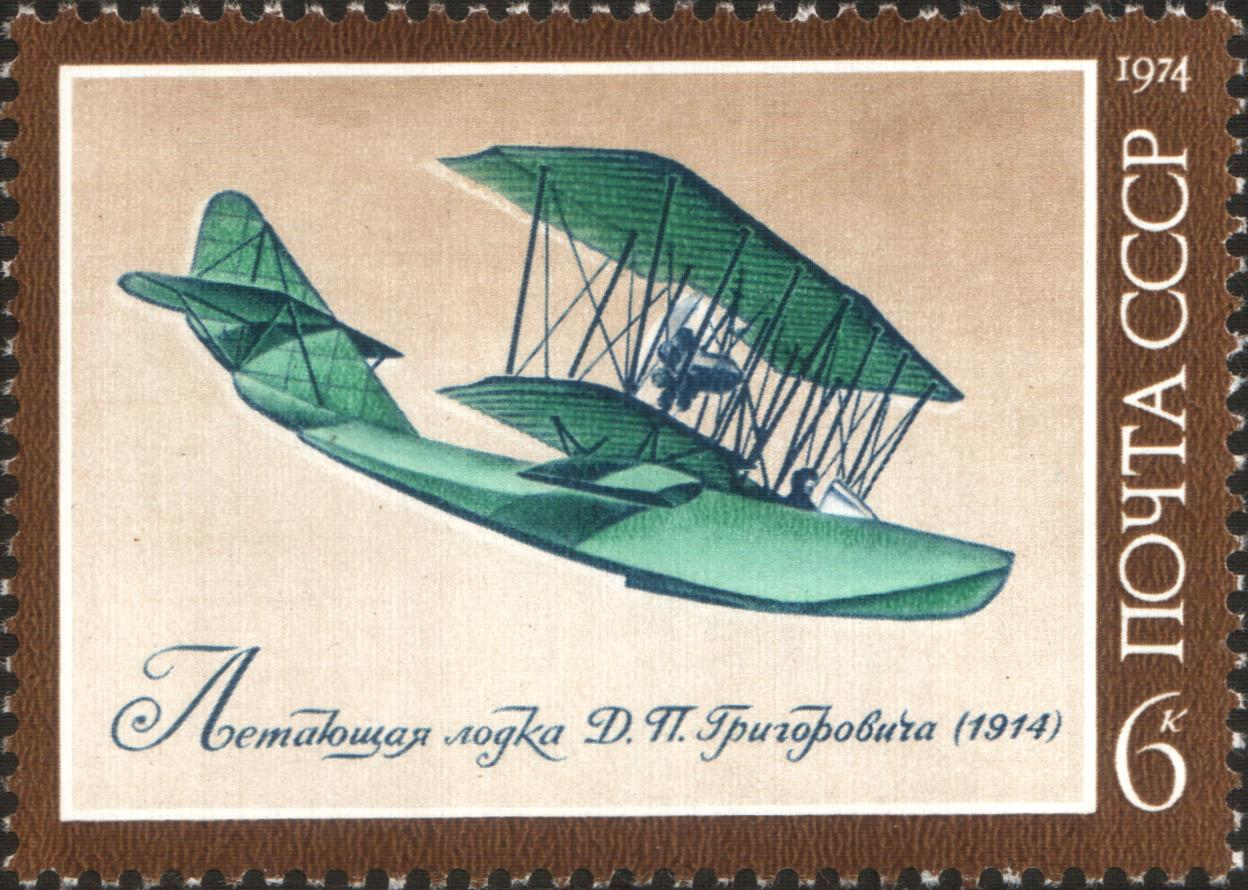
1974 CPA 4425
