= Miniplane =

Miniplane can refer to:

- Per Il Volo Miniplane, an Italian paramotor
- Smith Miniplane, an American biplane
