= Green Sky =

Green Sky may refer to:

- Green Sky Adventures, an American aircraft manufacturer based in Hawthorne, Florida
- Green Sky Trilogy, a series of fantasy novels by Zilpha Keatley Snyder
