= Hu-Go Craft =

General information
- Type: Homebuilt aircraft
- National origin: United States
- Designer: Adolph B. Hugo

History
- First flight: 19 April 1965

The Hu-Go Craft is a homebuilt biplane that was designed by Adolph B. Hugo, first flying on 19 April 1965.

== Design and development ==
Hugo designed the biplane incorporating elements of popular homebuilt aircraft of the time. The aircraft was based loosely around the Great Lakes 2T-1E, with features from the Rose Parakeet and Waco Aircraft Company biplanes. Plans were sold for amateur construction.

The aircraft is a conventional landing gear equipped, single seat, open cockpit biplane, with a fuselage constructed from welded steel tubing with aircraft fabric covering and spruce wing spars. The tail surfaces are wire braced. The upper wing is swept, while only the lower wings have dihedral.

Construction of the prototype took 4 1/2 years and 2500 hours of time.

== Specifications (Hu-Go Craft) ==
Data from Air Trails

General characteristics

- Crew: 1
- Length: 14 ft 7.5 in (4.458 m)
- Upper wingspan: 17 ft (5.2 m)
- Lower wingspan: 15 ft (4.6 m)
- Height: 5 ft 6 in (1.68 m)
- Wing area: 92 sq ft (8.5 m^{2})
- Airfoil: NACA M-12
- Empty weight: 548 lb (249 kg)
- Gross weight: 848 lb (385 kg)
- Powerplant: 1 × Continental A65-12 horizontally opposed piston aircraft engine, 65 hp (48 kW)
- Propellers: 2-bladed McCauley

Performance

- Maximum speed: 100 kn (115 mph, 185 km/h)
- Cruise speed: 91 kn (105 mph, 169 km/h)
- Stall speed: 55 kn (63 mph, 102 km/h)
- Service ceiling: 10,000 ft (3,000 m)
- Rate of climb: 1,000 ft/min (5.1 m/s)

== See also ==
Aircraft of comparable role, configuration, and era

- Great Lakes Sport Trainer
- Smith Miniplane
