= Mong MS1 Sport =

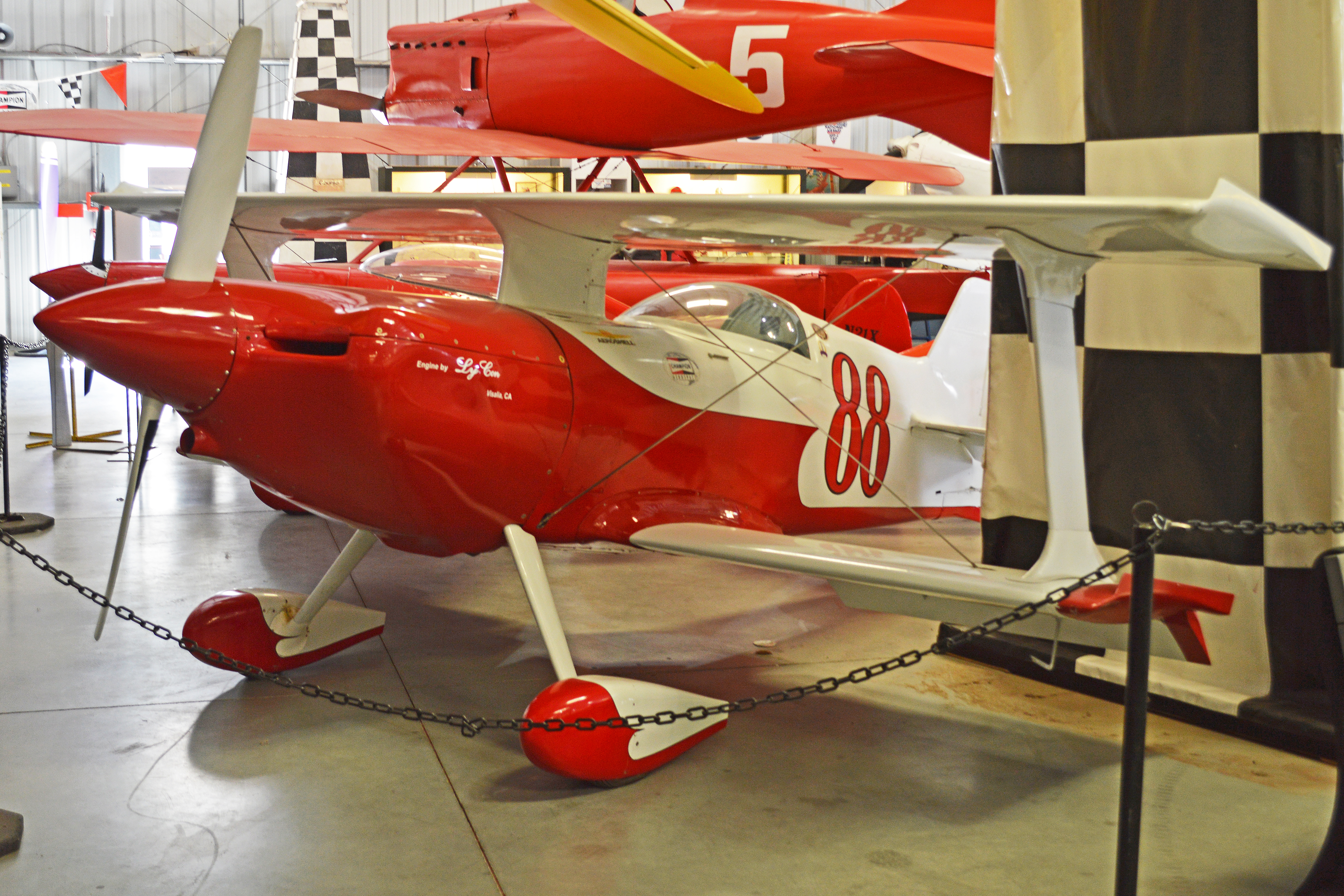

General information
- Type: Homebuilt Biplane
- National origin: United States of America
- Designer: Ralph Mong
- Number built: approximately 200

History
- Introduction date: 1953
- First flight: May 1, 1953
- Variant: Green Sky Adventures Micro Mong

The Mong MS1 Sport is a 1950s American homebuilt biplane design with over 400 sets of plans for the aircraft have been sold.

== Design and development ==
The first Mong Sport was built as a personal aircraft by the designer Ralph Mong, Jr. Plans for homebuilding were provided afterward in collaboration with Frank Powell, an Aerospace Engineer and draftsman for Aero Commander at the time, due to demand.

The original biplane was built around a Continental A65 65 hp (48 kW) engine. The biplane has the unique feature of lift struts placed between the lower fuselage frame and the upper wing I strut attachment. The biplane did not require expensive, drag producing support wires, using steel tubing instead. The fuselage is steel tube with aircraft fabric covering.

== Operational history ==
In the mid 1960s, a biplane class was added to the Reno Air Races. The Mong Sport met the basic qualifications, and has been extensively modified over the years by builders to be used as a biplane racer. In 1965, Bill Boland won with his "Boland Mong" at 148 mph and again in 1967 and 1970 with speeds of 151 mph and 177 mph respectively. The Mongster won the 1968 Biplane class of the Reno National Championship. Long Gone Mong won in 1987 and 1989. A highly modified Mong Phantom with carbon fiber wings won in 2006 with a speed of 251.958 mph, and has recently raised the record to 284.454mph.

== Variants ==
MS-1
MS-3
Green Sky Adventures Micro Mong
An ultralight designed by Ed Fisher at the suggestion of Ralph Mong in 1993. In 1996 Ed Fisher acquired the rights to the Mong Sport aircraft. In 2019, Mike Stewart acquired the rights from Fisher and currently sells plans for the MS-2 and MS-3, with some corrections to errors made in the original blueprints.

== Aircraft on display ==
A Mong MS1 Sport is on display at the Planes of Fame Air Museum, Chino, California.

== Specifications (Mong MS1 Sport) ==
Data from EAA

General characteristics

- Crew: 1
- Length: 14 ft 1 in (4.29 m)
- Wingspan: 16 ft 10 in (5.13 m)
- Height: 5 ft 6 in (1.68 m)
- Wing area: 80 sq ft (7.4 m^{2})
- Empty weight: 550 lb (249 kg)
- Gross weight: 970 lb (440 kg)
- Fuel capacity: 16 US gallons (61 litres)
- Powerplant: 1 × Continental A65 , 65 hp (48 kW)

Performance

- Maximum speed: 100 kn (115 mph, 185 km/h)
- Cruise speed: 96 kn (110 mph, 180 km/h)
- Stall speed: 43 kn (50 mph, 80 km/h)
- Range: 350 nmi (400 mi, 640 km)
- Service ceiling: 13,000 ft (4,000 m)
- Rate of climb: 1,000 ft/min (5.1 m/s)

== See also ==
Aircraft of comparable role, configuration, and era

- Knight Twister
- Smith Miniplane
