= Payne Knight Twister =

American homebuilt warbird replica

Knight Twister
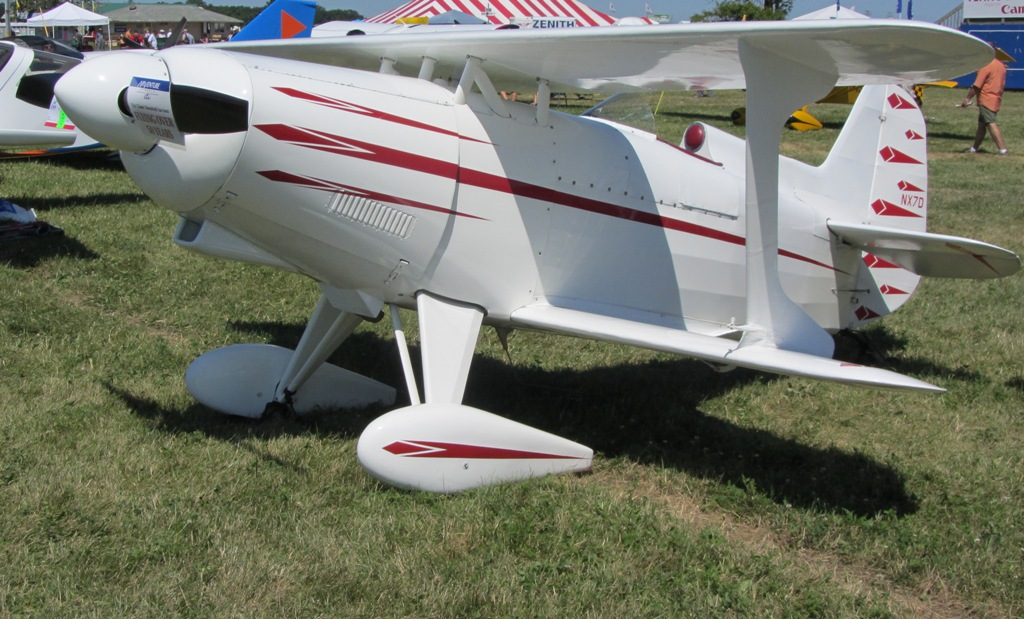
- 1951 D-1 Knight Twister

General information
- Type: Sport aircraft
- National origin: United States
- Manufacturer: Homebuilt
- Designer: Vernon W. Payne, Sr.
- Number built: about 75

History
- First flight: 1932

The Payne Knight Twister is a single-seat, single-engine aerobatic sport aircraft first flown by Vernon Payne Sr. in the United States in 1932 and marketed in plans form for homebuilding.

== Design and development ==
It is a conventional biplane design with slightly staggered wings of unequal span. The wings are of fully cantilever design and do not require the bracing wires commonly used on biplanes or even interplane struts; however, most builders brace the wings with I-struts and at least one pair of wires. The cockpit is open, and the undercarriage is of fixed, tailwheel type with divided main units. The wings and horizontal stabilizer are of wooden construction, skinned in plywood, while the fuselage and vertical stabilizer are of welded steel tube covered in fabric.

Payne designed the Knight Twister in 1928 while teaching aircraft design and repair at a school attached to the Aviation Service and Transport Company in Chicago. Construction of a prototype by Payne and his students commenced the following year but ended shortly thereafter when the school was forced to close as a consequence of the Great Depression. Payne began building a second prototype in 1931, which first flew in fall the following year powered by a Salmson 9Ad radial engine. This aircraft was damaged in a forced landing due to fuel exhaustion during a demonstration flight for the press, and parts of the airframe were reused to build the second Knight Twister in 1935. This machine, powered by a converted Ford Model A automobile engine, was built for an Argentine buyer who eventually declined to take delivery. After it had passed through several hands, Payne himself bought the aircraft back after World War II and his son, Richard, was killed in it during a test flight on which the engine failed shortly after take-off.

== Operational history ==
The Knight Twister built a reputation as a racing aircraft. In 1964, Clyde Parsons flying the "Parsons Twister", won the Sport Biplane Championship race at Reno with a speed of 144.7 mph. In the 1970s, Don Fairbanks competed with a Knight Twister preserved initially at the Motorsports Hall of Fame of America museum in Novi, Michigan, and later in the lobby of Sporty's Pilot Shop at Clermont County Airport, Batavia, Ohio. Fairbanks set the world record in the sport biplane class of 178 mph (284 km/h) with this aircraft.

The Knight Twister has a reputation as a "handful" to fly, but this has been vigorously denied by both its designer and by Fairbanks. Both men have attributed this reputation to the controls being lighter and more responsive than those of the light aircraft that most pilots are more familiar with.

In the 1990s, the rights to the design were acquired by Steen Aero, who continue to offer plans for sale in 2009.

== Variants ==
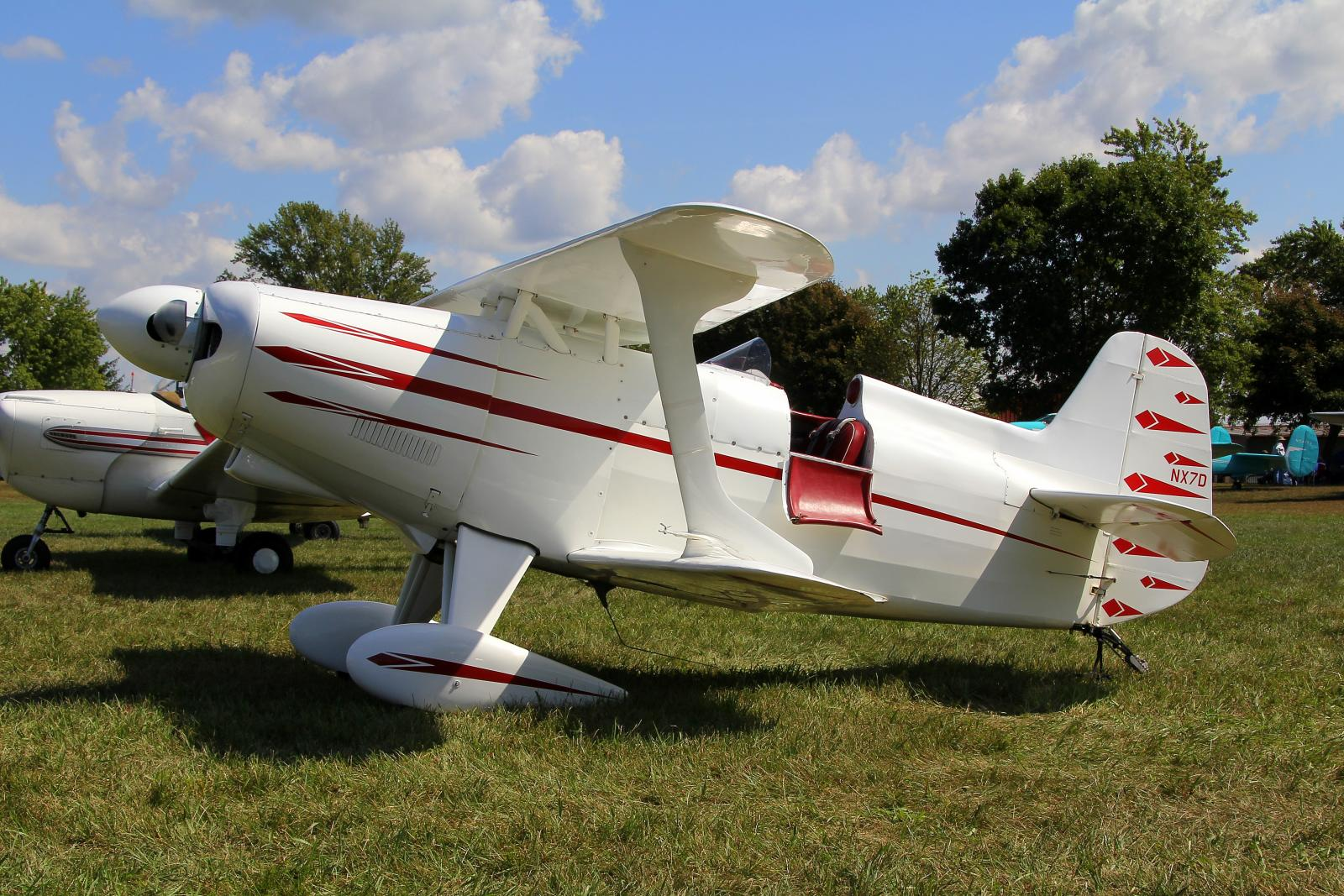
KT-125

Data from: "Knight Twister Historical Information" (except as noted)

- KTS-1 - first prototype with Salmson 9Ad engine (1 built)
- KTD-2 - second prototype with converted Ford Model A engine designated Douglas Bear(1 built), later redesignated Knight Twister Junior 75-85
- KT-50 - version with 50 hp (37 kW) Continental or Franklin engine and 18-ft wingspan
- KT-75 Knight Twister Junior - version with 75 hp (56 kW) Continental or Lycoming engine and 17 ft 6 in-wingspan
- KT-80 - version with 80 hp (60 kW) Franklin engine
- KT-85 - standard version with Continental engine of 85 to 90 hp (63 to 67 kW) and 15-ft wingspan
- KT-90 - version with 90 hp (67 kW) engine and 15-ft wingspan
  - KTT-90 - version with 90 hp (67 kW) Lycoming engine and 18-ft wingspan
- KT-95 - version with 95 hp (71 kW) Lambert engine
- KT-125 - version with 185 hp (138 kW) engine
- KT-140 - version with 140 hp (104 kW) engine.
  - SKT-125 Sunday Knight Twister - version with 125 hp (93 kW) Lycoming engine and 19 ft 6 in-wingspan
- KT Imperial - version with engine of 135 to 150 hp (101 to 112 kW) and wing area increased (span: 17 ft 6 in) to comply with Sport Biplane class rules
- KT Holiday - version with 125 hp (93 kW) engine and wingspan of 19 ft 6 in
- KT Acro - version with wingspan of 15 ft 6 in
- KT Coed - version with passenger seat in tandem with pilot's; wingspan of 22 ft 6 in.
- Double Twist - A two place model with an untapered 21 ft M6 airfoil.
- Pretty Prairie Special II model 1 - Straight leg conventionally braced based on a Knight Twister, stretched 16 inches
- Pretty Prairie Special III - A Menasco powered variant displayed in the EAA Airventure Museum in Oshkosh, Wisconsin until 2006, and now at the Kansas Aviation Museum.

== Specifications (KT-85) ==
Data from Jane's All the World's Aircraft 1977–78, p.552

General characteristics

- Crew: One pilot
- Length: 14 ft 0 in (4.27 m)
- Wingspan: 15 ft 0 in (4.57 m)
- Height: 5 ft 3 in (1.60 m)
- Wing area: 60 sq ft (5.6 m^{2})
- Empty weight: 535 lb (243 kg)
- Gross weight: 960 lb (435 kg)
- Powerplant: 1 × Continental C90 , 90 hp (67 kW)

Performance

- Maximum speed: 160 mph (257 km/h, 140 kn)
- Range: 390 mi (625 km, 340 nmi)
- Rate of climb: 900 ft/min (4.6 m/s)

== See also ==
Aircraft of comparable role, configuration, and era

- Mong MS1 Sport
- Smith Miniplane

== Notes ==
- Davisson, Budd (October 1999). "Hale Wallace's Baby Biplane Bullet". Sport Aviation: 44.
- Davisson, Budd (October 2000). "Biplanes You can Build". EAA Sport Aviation.
- Fairbanks, Don. "undated letter".
- Jane's All the World's Aircraft 1977–78. London: Jane's Publishing.
- "Knight Twister Historical Information". Steen Aero Lab website. Palm Bay, Florida: Steen Aero Lab.
- Payne, Vernon. "Vernon Payne's History of the Knight Twister". Steen Aero Lab website. Palm Bay, Florida: Steen Aero Lab.
- "Knight Twister Junior". Air Trails: 34. July 1949.
- Taylor, Michael J. H. (1989). Jane's Encyclopedia of Aviation. London: Studio Editions. ISBN 0-7106-0710-5.
- "The New Knight Twister". Popular Aviation: 35. October 1937.
