= Green Sky Zippy Sport =

Aircraft

General information
- Type: Single-seat recreational monoplane
- National origin: United States
- Manufacturer: Green Sky Adventures
- Designer: Ed Fisher

History
- First flight: 1986

The Green Sky Zippy Sport is an American single-seat single-engined monoplane designed by Ed Fisher of Raceair Designs and marketed for amateur construction by Green Sky Adventures of Hawthorne, Florida.

== Development ==
The Zippy Sport is a single-seat, high-wing monoplane powered by a 50 hp (37 kW) Rotax 503 piston engine. Other engines have been fitted, including VW. Of mixed construction, it has a welded 4130 steel fuselage and wooden wings covered with doped aircraft fabric covering and fixed conventional landing gear. The wings are designed to be folded for storage or ground transport. The aircraft is available in the form of plans for amateur construction.

== Specifications ==
Data from Taylor

General characteristics

- Crew: 1
- Length: 17 ft 10 in (5.44 m)
- Wingspan: 26 ft 4 in (8.03 m)
- Empty weight: 421 lb (191 kg)
- Gross weight: 680 lb (308 kg)
- Powerplant: 1 × Rotax 503 piston, 50 hp (37 kW)

Performance

- Maximum speed: 120 mph (193 km/h, 104 kn)
- Cruise speed: 100 mph (161 km/h, 87 kn)
- Stall speed: 40 mph (65 km/h, 35 kn)
- Range: 300 mi (480 km, 260 nmi)
- Rate of climb: 700 ft/min (3.6 m/s)
