= Green Sky Adventures Micro Mong =

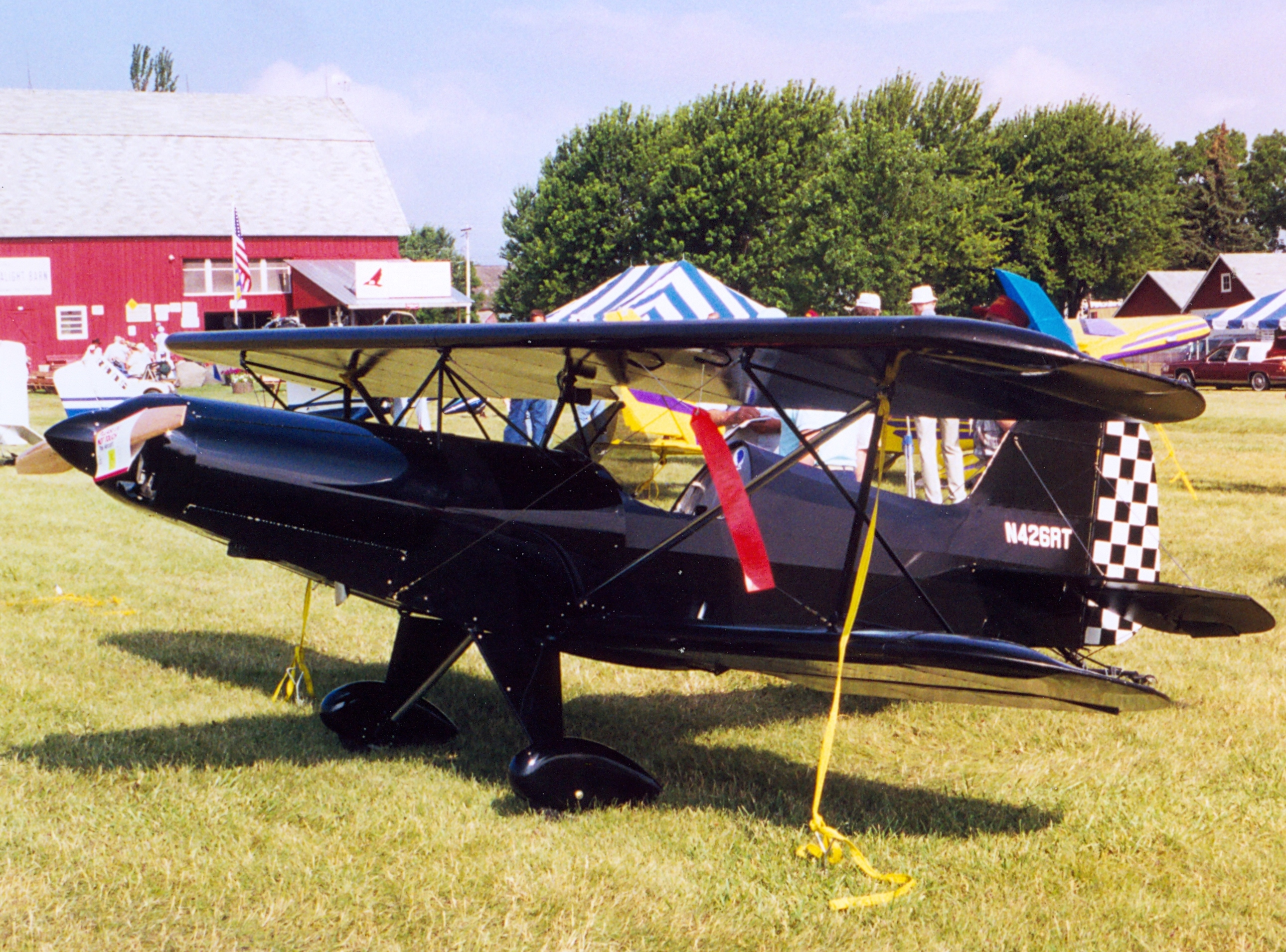
- Micro Mong

General information
- Type: Ultralight aircraft
- National origin: United States of America
- Manufacturer: Green Sky Adventures
- Designer: Ed Fisher
- Number built: 19 (2011)

History
- Introduction date: 1993
- First flight: 1993
- Developed from: Mong Sport (Configuration only)

The Green Sky Adventures Micro Mong is an ultralight biplane based on the Mong MS1 Sport.

== Development ==
Ed Fisher, an avid compiler of Mong Sport history, in 1981 met with designer Ralph Mong. After the completion of the Fisher Skylite, Fisher suggested building an ultralight version of the Mong Sport. A custom built ultralight prototype was built for Fisher, called the Travelight. A second model was constructed, built for pilots up to 6' 2" (188 cm), which became known as the Micro Mong.

== Design ==
The fuselage is welded 4130 steel tubing. The front wing spars are 2.5 in (6.4 cm) aluminum tubing, with aluminum ribs and aircraft fabric covering. If equipped with a Rotax 277 engine, the aircraft meets American FAR 103 Ultralight Vehicle standards, by weighing less than 254 lb (115 kg). The wing area of the ultralight version is larger than the heavier Mong Sport it replicates, in order to keep the stall speed low.

== Operational history ==
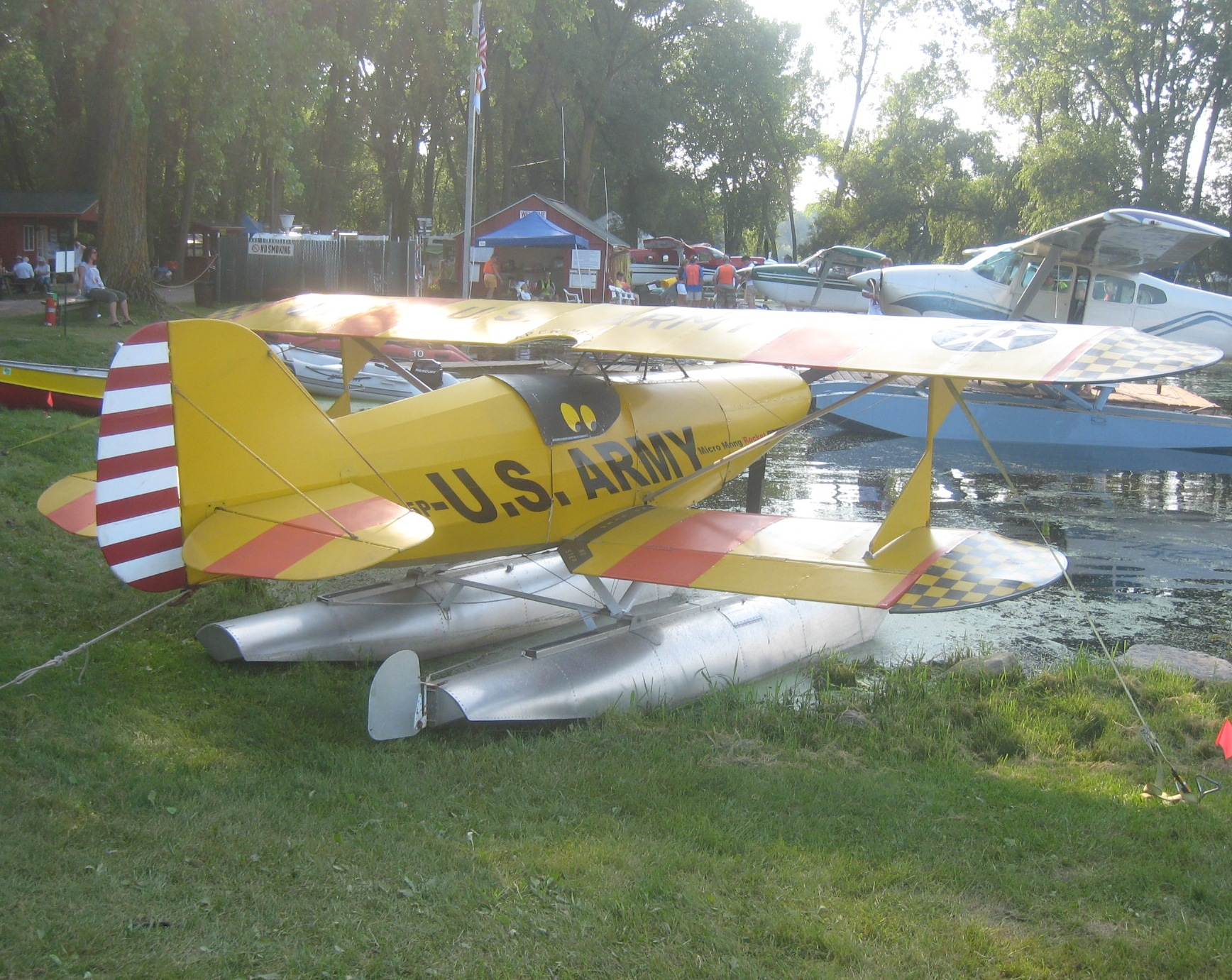
Micro Mong on floats

A Micro Mong floatplane recorded the fastest seaplane takeoff of 2.5 seconds at the Experimental Aircraft Association airshow in 2008.

== Variants ==
Micro Mong 2XF
Powered by a HKS 700E 2 cylinder 4-stroke air-cooled engine.
Raceair Lil Bitts
Developed at the same time by Fisher using a deeper Micro Mong fuselage to resemble a Pitts Special.

== Specifications (Micro Mong) ==
Data from Green Sky Adventures

General characteristics

- Length: 14 ft (4.3 m)
- Wingspan: 19 ft 6 in (5.94 m)
- Height: 6 ft (1.8 m)
- Wing area: 100 sq ft (9.3 m^{2})
- Airfoil: Modified Clark Y
- Empty weight: 400 lb (181 kg)
- Gross weight: 600 lb (272 kg)

Performance

- Maximum speed: 96 kn (110 mph, 180 km/h)
- Cruise speed: 70 kn (80 mph, 130 km/h)
- Stall speed: 30 kn (35 mph, 56 km/h)

== See also ==
Aircraft of comparable role, configuration, and era

- Mong MS1 Sport
