= WACO Classic Aircraft =

American aircraft manufacturer

- Type: Privately held company
- Industry: General Aviation
- Founded: 1983
- Defunct: 2026
- Headquarters: Battle Creek, Michigan
- Key people: Peter F. Bowers (President)
- Products: WACO Classic YMF & Great Lakes Model 2T-1A-1/2
- Number of employees: 37
- Parent: Dimor Group Inc
- Website: www.wacoaircraft.com

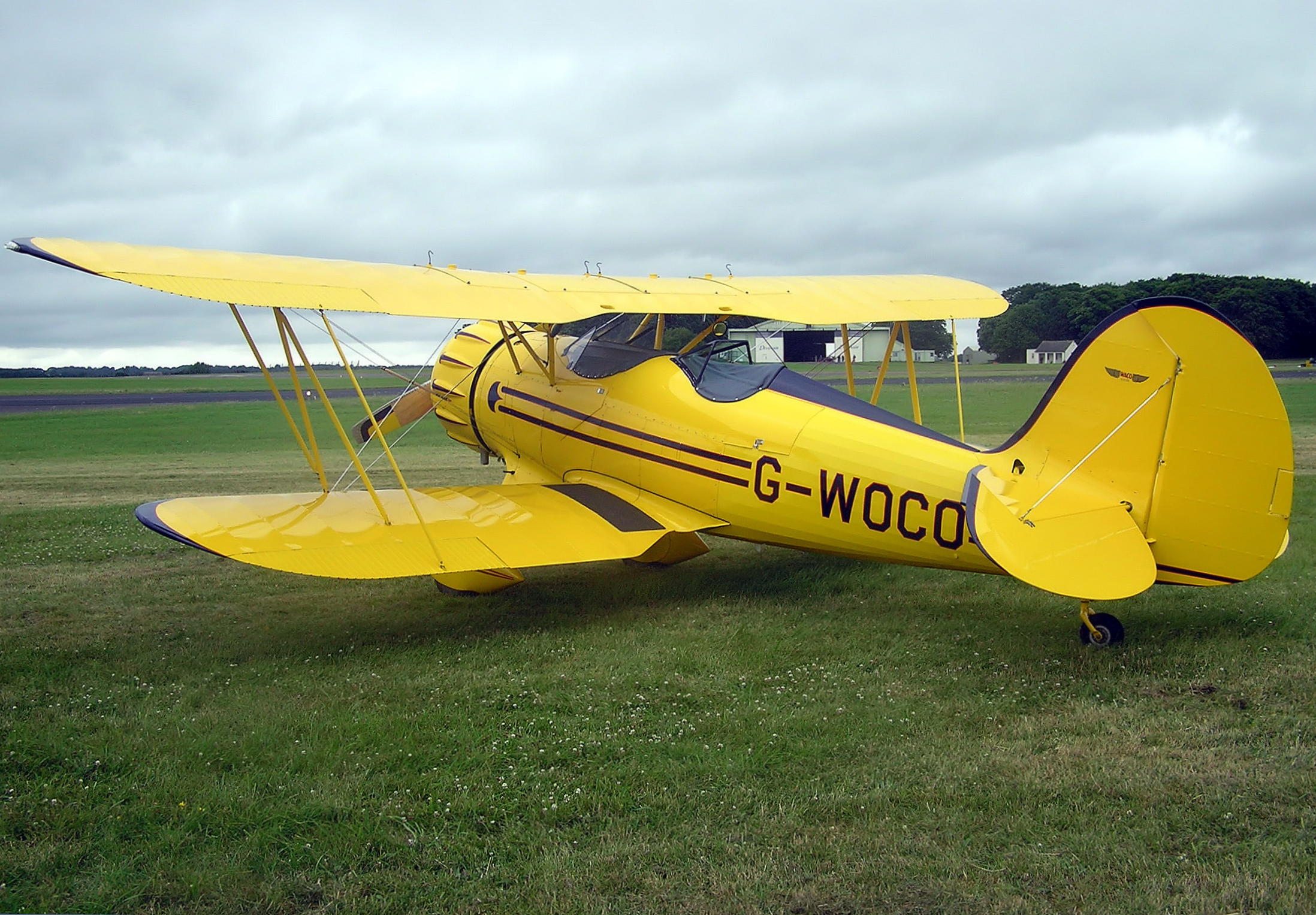
WACO Classic YMF-5C biplane, built in 2000

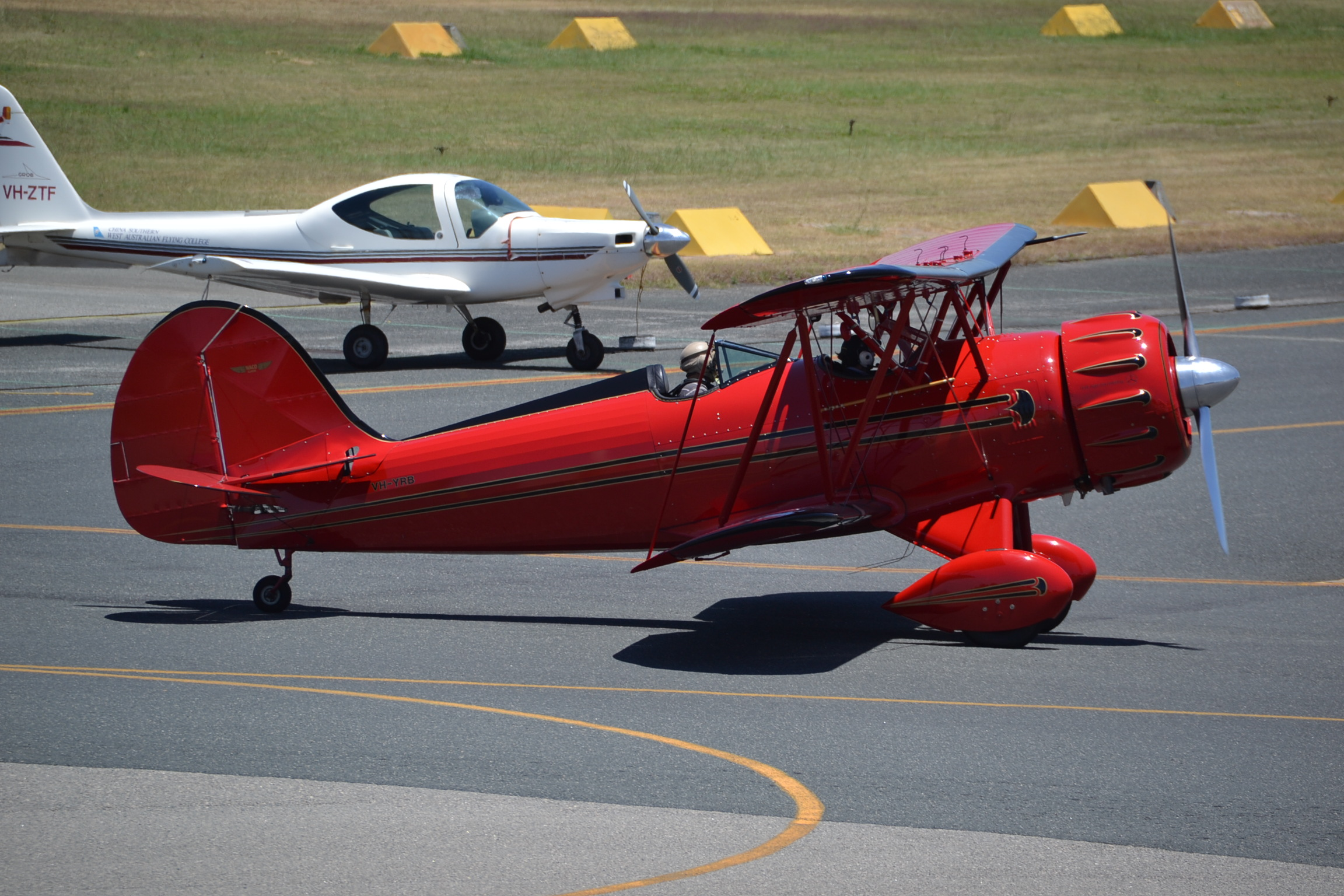
WACO YMF-5C Super at Jandakot, Perth, Australia (2014)

The WACO Classic Aircraft Corporation was an American aircraft manufacturer, located in Battle Creek, Michigan. It was founded in 1983 as the Classic Aircraft Corporation and was later called the WACO Aircraft Corporation.

WACO Classic Aircraft built, in relatively small numbers, a three-seat biplane, the WACO Classic YMF, based upon the original manufacturing plans which were filed by the Waco Aircraft Company with the Library of Congress and thus available. WACO Classic Aircraft also built the WACO Great Lakes Aircraft, an open cockpit aerobatic biplane. The aircraft were constructed at the W. K. Kellogg Airport in Battle Creek, Michigan. The company also repaired original "classic" WACOs and vintage aircraft.

While the aircraft it built was a longstanding design, WACO Classic Aircraft had upgraded many systems, such as the brakes, to newer and safer technology. They were built with much of the original hand construction methods and are sought after as a classical open-cockpit aircraft, but with modern digital electronics. Waco Classic only offered one of several models of original Wacos that were built. Over 100 new YMF-5C aircraft had been completed by 2007.

== History ==
In June 2009, the company announced the improved YMF-5D version, powered by a Jacobs R-755-A2 300 hp (224 kW) engine. The type was to be type certified in October 2009 and features a new MT-Propeller, a deluxe leather interior, new lightweight carbon fiber wheel pants and fairings, an upgraded avionics package and a cup holder.

In January 2011, the company announced that it would put the Great Lakes Model 2T-1A-1/2 biplane back into production. The aircraft had not been available since 1980. The aircraft incorporates several changes including a larger cockpit and advanced avionics. It is equipped with the Lycoming AEIO-360-B1F6 engine. In May 2012, the company announced that the first production Great Lakes was being constructed and it was completed in June 2013.

In March 2017, the company announced it was planning to test amphibious floats on the YMF-5.

In November 2018, the company was acquired by the Florida-based Dimor Group Inc. Dimor announced in February 2025 that it would be spending $12 million to expand the Battle Creek campus to build Junkers A50 airplanes there.

The company abruptly ceased operations in late April 2026.

== Aircraft ==
Model name	First flight	Number built	Type
Great Lakes Sport Trainer		20 (Note: By 2022.)	Single engine open cockpit biplane trainer
WACO Classic YMF	1985		Single engine open cockpit biplane trainer
