= Per Il Volo =

Italian aircraft manufacturer

Coordinates: 45.6662657°N 11.804600°E

- Company type: Private company
- Industry: Aerospace
- Headquarters: Galliera Veneta, Italy
- Products: paramotors and aircraft engines
- Website: www.miniplane.net

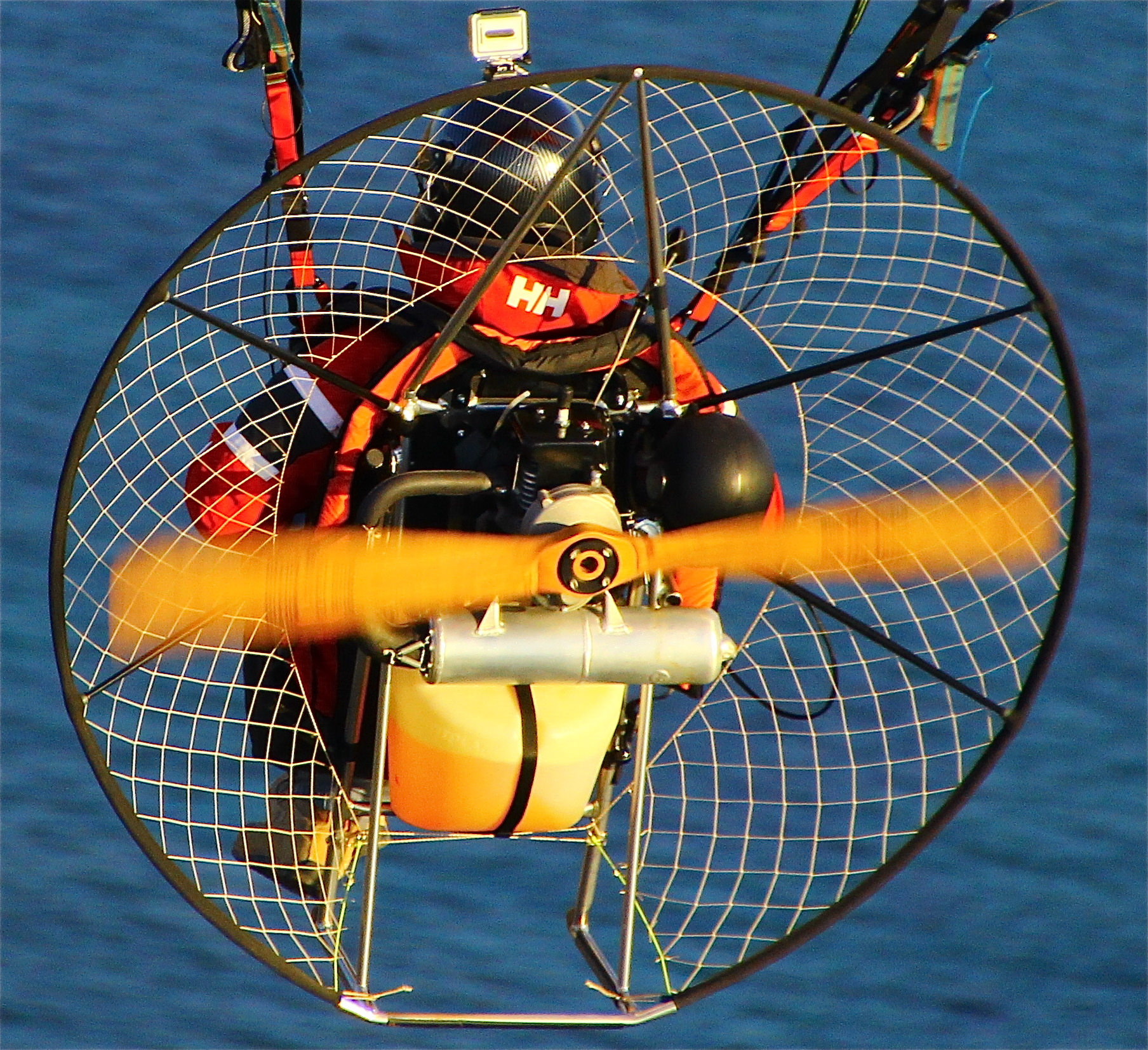
a Per Il Volo Miniplane, powered by the company's own Per Il Volo Top 80 engine

Per Il Volo (English: For The Flight) is an Italian aircraft manufacturer based in Galliera Veneta. The company specializes in the design and manufacture of paramotors and aircraft engines.

The company designed and built the first purpose-designed paramotor engine, the Top 80 and also the aircraft to fit it, the Miniplane, both of which remain in production in the 21st century.

== Aircraft ==
Summary of aircraft built by Per Il Volo
Model name	First flight	Number built	Type
Per Il Volo Miniplane	1989		paramotor

== See also ==
- List of Italian companies
