= Per Il Volo Top 80 =

Italian aircraft engine

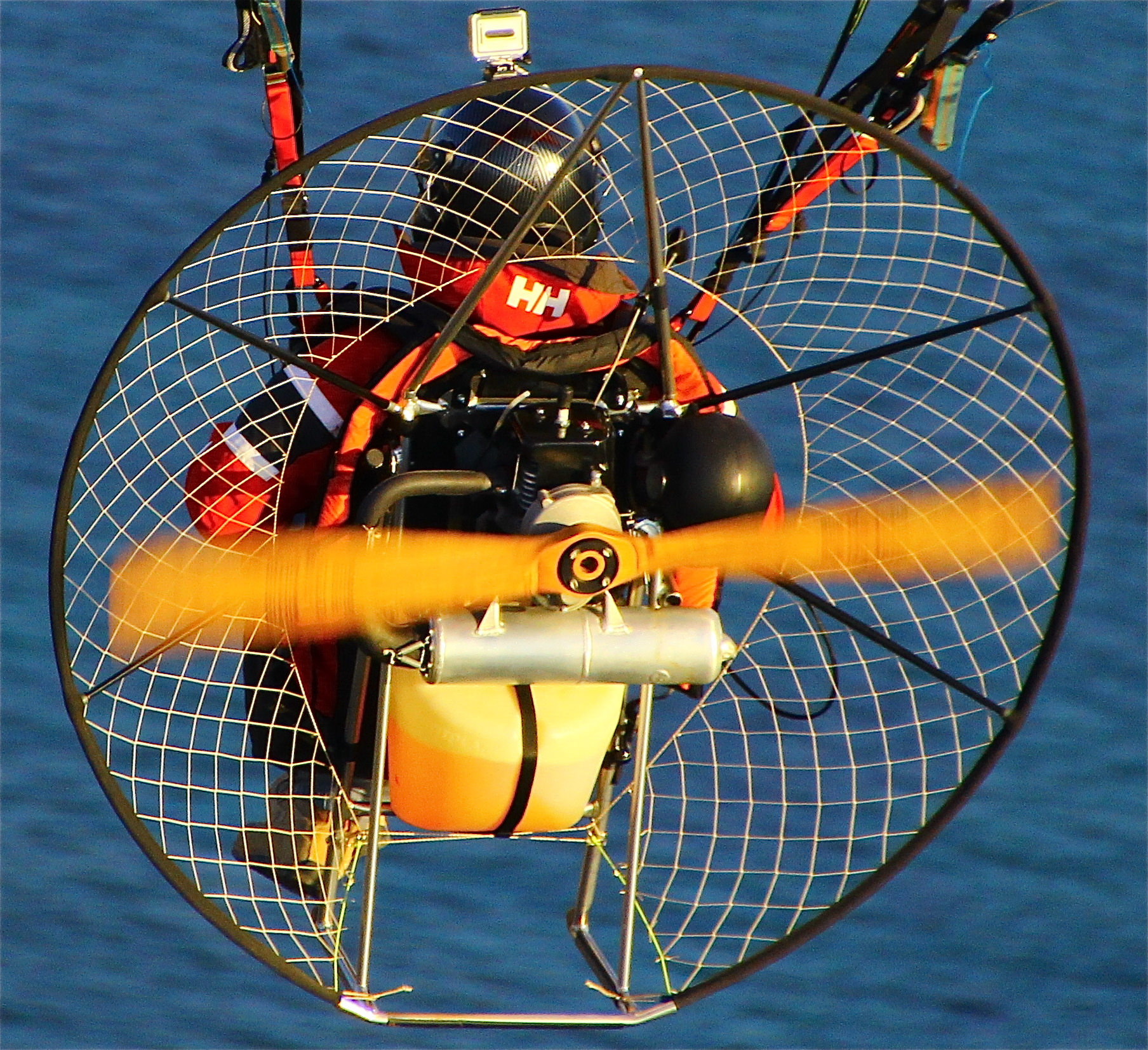
- Top 80 mounted on a Per Il Volo Miniplane
- Type: Single cylinder, two-stroke aircraft engine
- National origin: Italy
- Manufacturer: Per Il Volo
- Major applications: Per Il Volo Miniplane

The Per Il Volo Top 80 is an Italian single cylinder, two-stroke aircraft engine designed and produced by Per Il Volo of Galliera Veneta for powered paragliding. It was the first purpose-designed paramotor engine.

== Design and development ==
The Top 80 was developed specifically for the Per Il Volo Miniplane, which was introduced in 1989.

The engine uses fan-cooling and a Walbro 24 diaphragm or Dell'Orto 17.5 basin-type carburetor. Designed for light weight as the overall consideration, the engine weighs 10 kg (22.0 lb), plus the exhaust system weight of 2.6 kg (5.7 lb). With the Walbro carburetor the Top 80 produces 11 kW (14.8 hp) at 9500 rpm. Power is delivered to the two-bladed wooden propeller though a reverse-turning gear box to reduce output net torque felt by the pilot during acceleration and deceleration. The oil filled gearbox can be fitted with 22/70 gears giving a reduction ratio of 3:182, 21/71 gears giving 3.381, 20/72 gears giving 3.60, 19/73 gears giving 3.842 or 18/74 gears with a ratio of 4.111. The engine also fits a centrifugal clutch that allows idling without turning the propeller, a useful feature in its main application on a paramotor, where it improves ground safety.

== Applications ==
- Airtime Discovery T125
- Fly Castelluccio Flash
- Fly Products Power
- H&E Paramotores Ziklon
- Jet Pocket Top 80
- Marbella Parapente Paramotor PAP
- Paramotor Mosquito
- Per Il Volo Miniplane

== Specifications (Top 80) ==
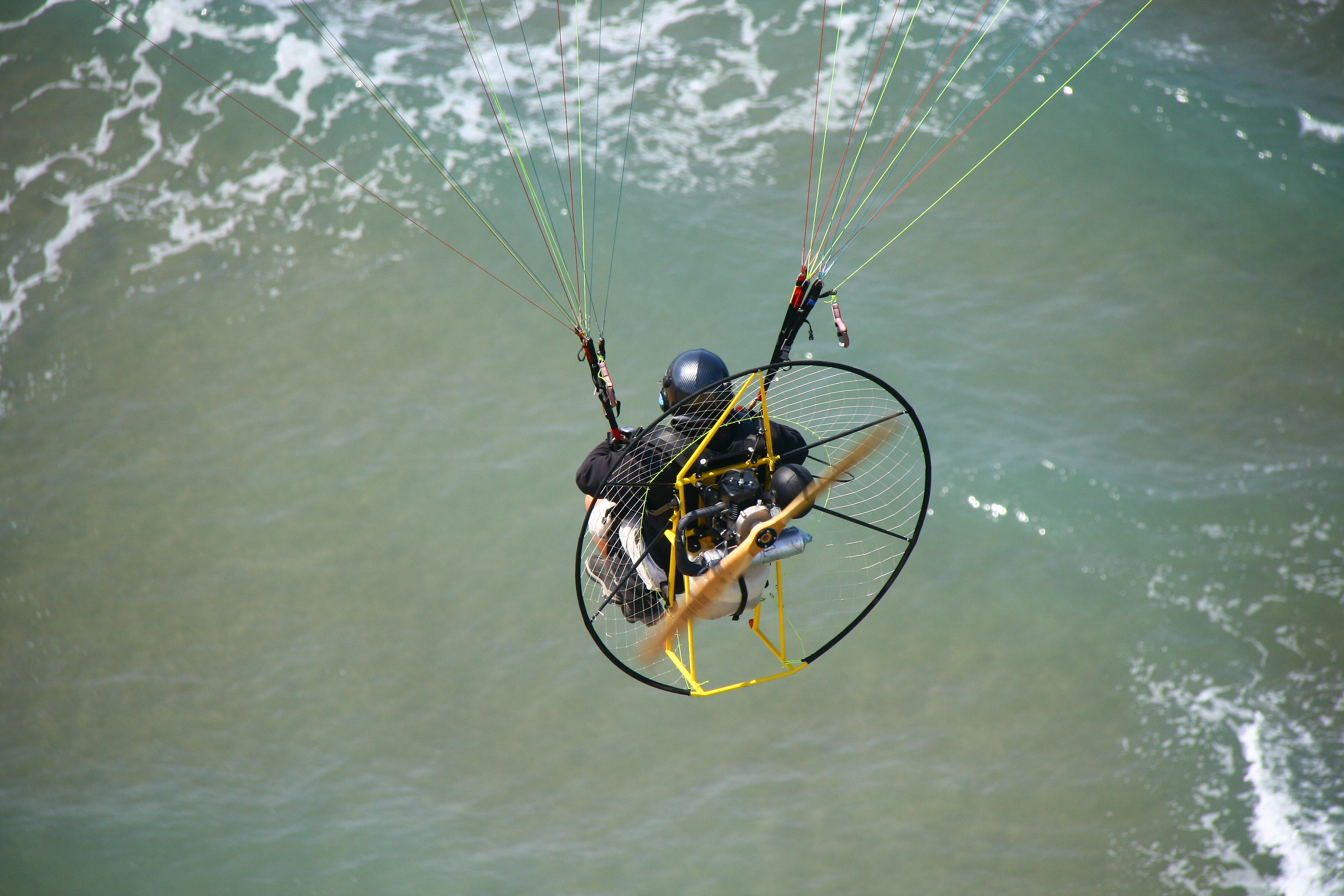
Top 80 mounted on a Per Il Volo Miniplane

Data from Cliche, Bertrand and Per Il Volo

=== General characteristics ===
- Type: single cylinder, two-stroke aircraft engine
- Bore: 47.7 mm (1.878 in)
- Stroke: 44 mm (1.73 in)
- Displacement: 80 cc (4.88 cu in)
- Length: 24 cm (9.45 in)
- Width: 28 cm (11.02 in)
- Height: 29 cm (11.42 in)
- Dry weight: 10 kg (22.0 lb), plus the exhaust system 2.6 kg (5.7 lb)

=== Components ===
- Valvetrain: piston ported
- Fuel system: Walbro 24 diaphragm or Dell'Orto 17.5 basin-type carburetor
- Fuel type: auto fuel
- Oil system: premixed oil and fuel
- Cooling system: fan forced air
- Reduction gear: oil filled gearbox, reduction ratios of 3:182, 3.381, 3.60, 3.842 and 4.111 available

=== Performance ===
- Power output: 11 kW (14.8 hp) at 9500 rpm with Walbro carburettor, 10 kW (13.4 hp) at 9300 rpm with Dell'Orto carburettor
- Power-to-weight ratio: 1:1
