= Green Sky Adventures =

American aircraft manufacturer

Green Sky Adventures, Inc.
- Company type: Privately held company
- Industry: Aerospace
- Founded: 1984
- Headquarters: Hawthorne, Florida, United States
- Products: Kit aircraft
- Website: www.greenskyadventures.com

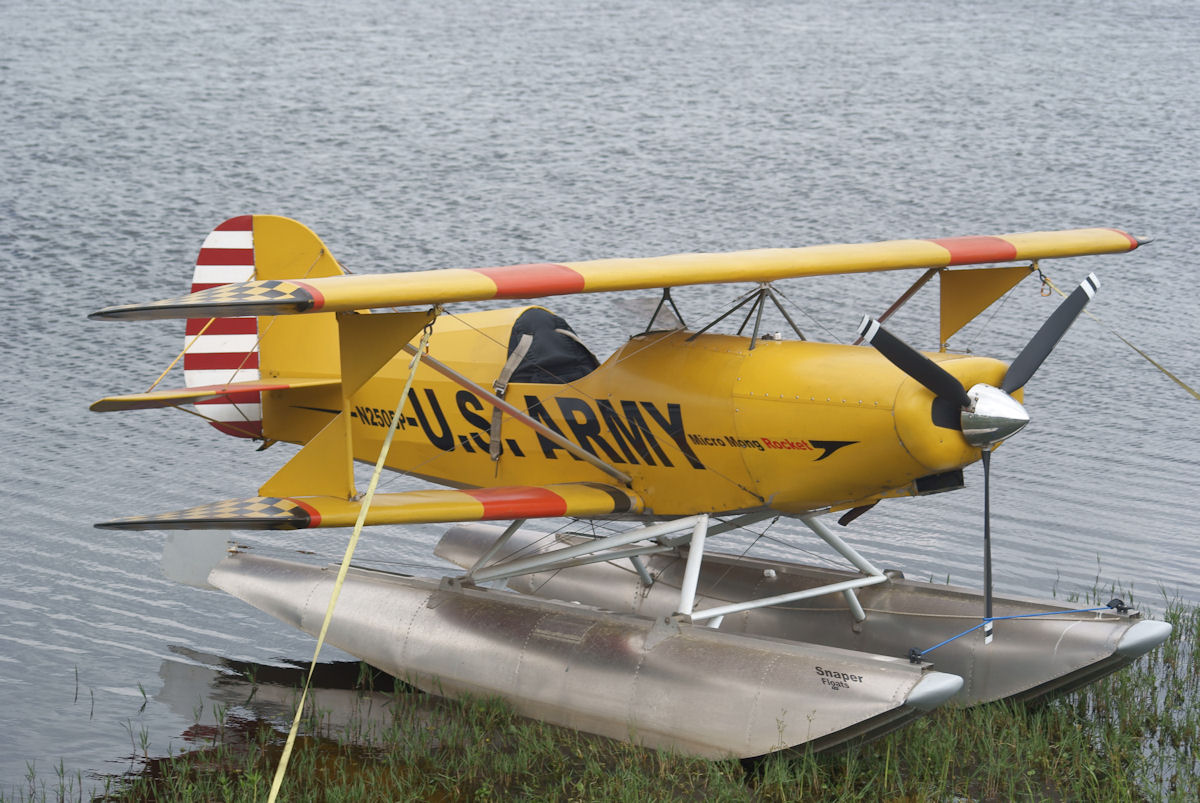
Green Sky Adventures Micro Mong on floats

Green Sky Adventures, Inc. is an American aircraft manufacturer based in Hawthorne, Florida. The company specializes in the design and manufacture of light aircraft in the form of plans and kits for amateur construction. It was established in 1984.

The company provides plans for the Green Sky Zippy Sport, a single seat strut-braced high wing aircraft, and kits for the Green Sky Adventures Micro Mong biplane design. The company also distributes the HKS 700E and the Rotax line of two-stroke and four-stroke aircraft engines, GSC Systems propellers and AeroLux Propellers.

== Aircraft ==
Summary of aircraft built by Green Sky Adventures
Model name	First flight	Number built	Type
Green Sky Zippy Sport	1986		Single seat homebuilt monoplane
Green Sky Adventures Micro Mong	1993	19 (2011)	Single seat homebuilt biplane
