= Smith Miniplane =

American homebuilt biplane

DSA-1 Miniplane
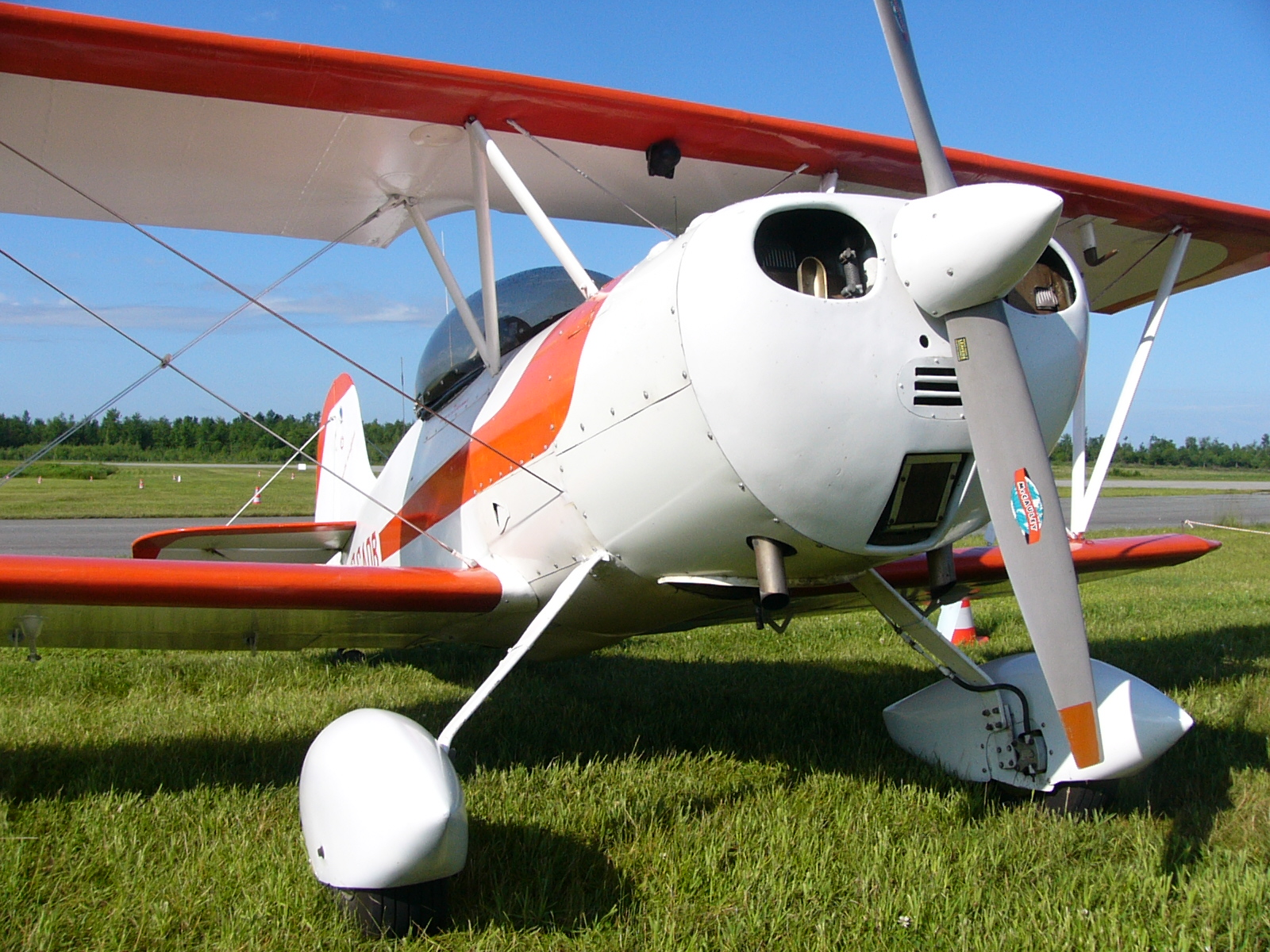

General information
- Type: Homebuilt sport biplane
- National origin: United States
- Manufacturer: Sky Classic Aircraft
- Designer: Frank W. Smith
- Status: Plans available (2011)
- Number built: 350 sets of plans sold by 1977

History
- First flight: October 29, 1956

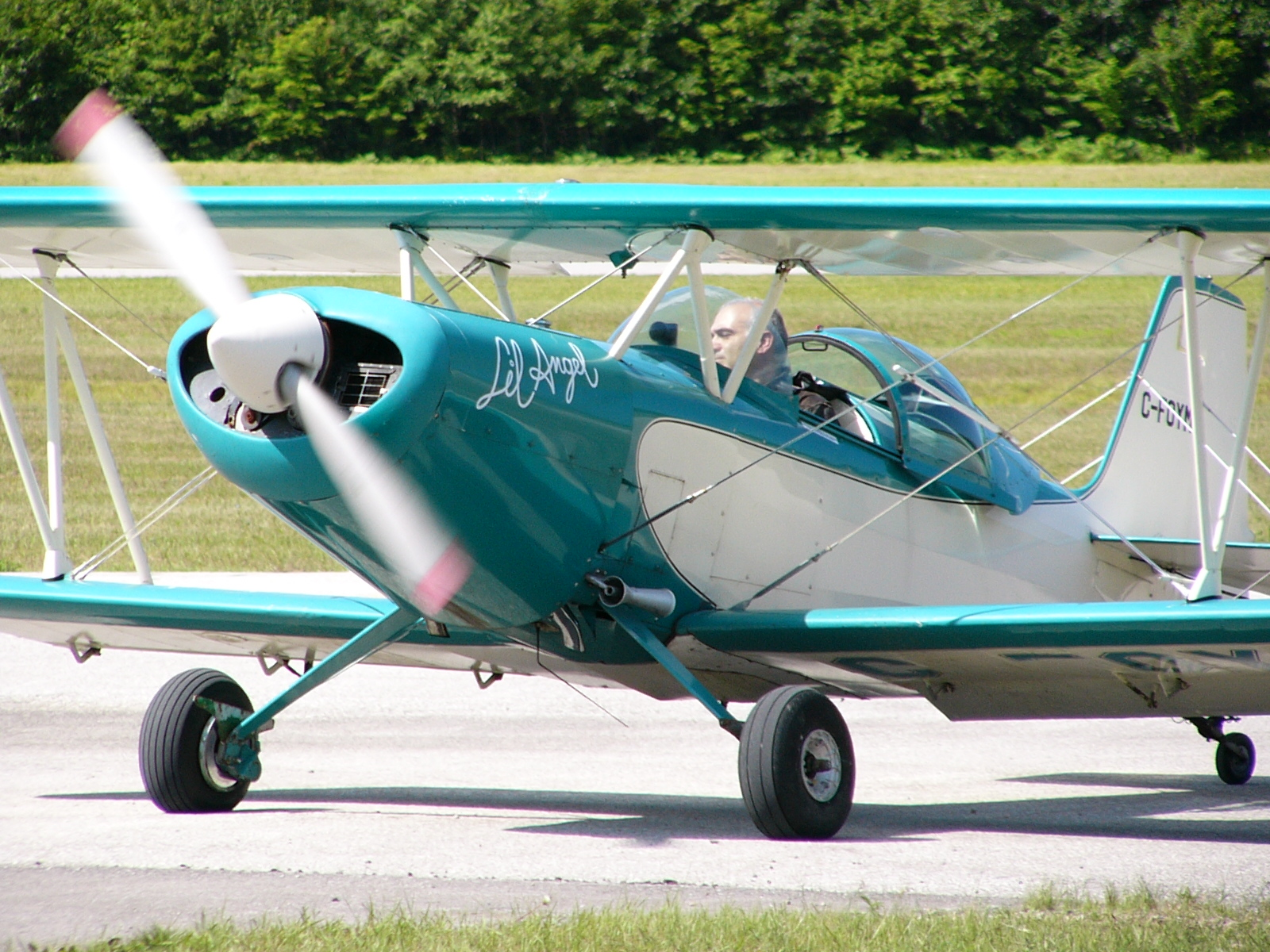
Smith Miniplane

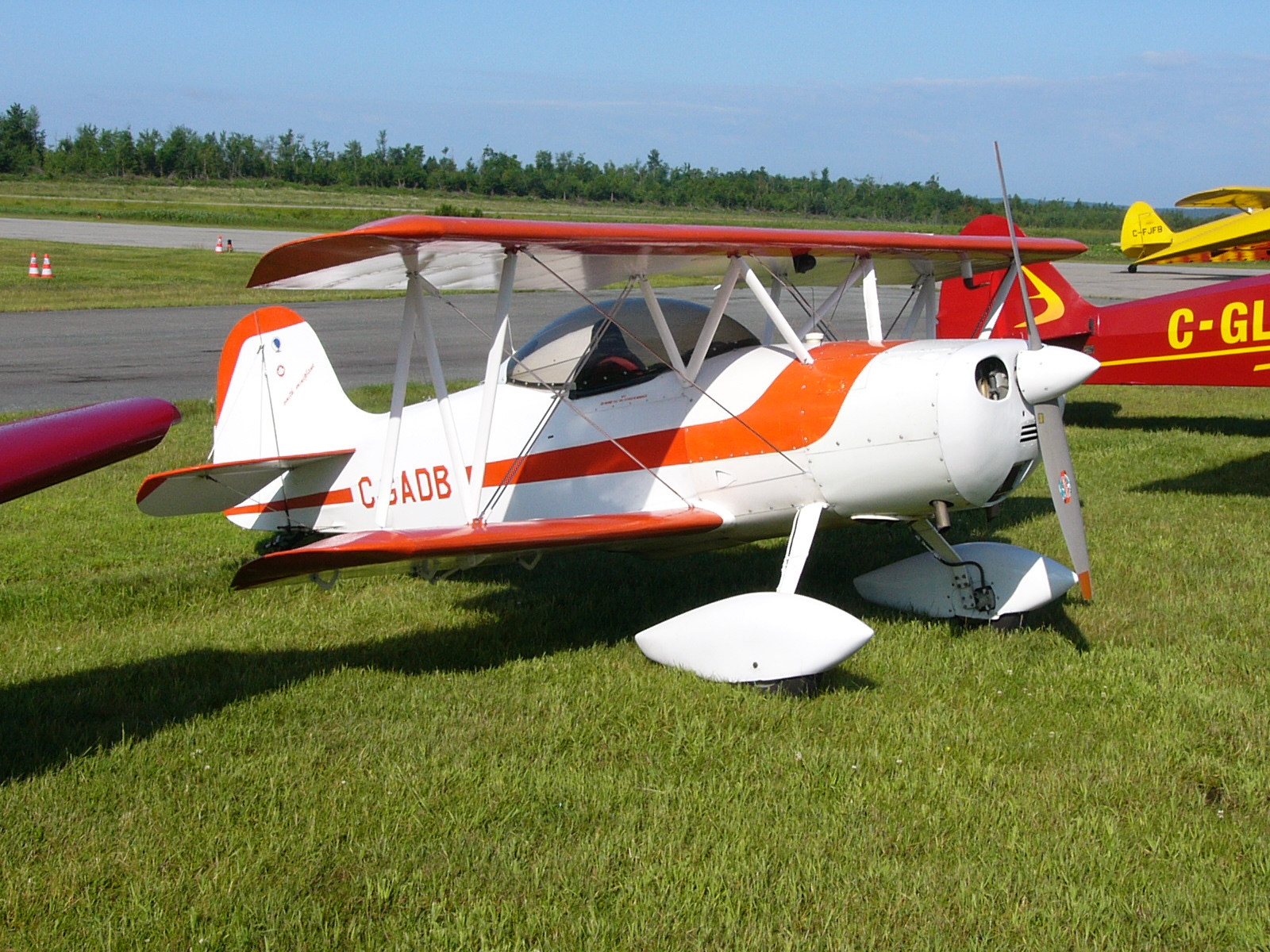
Smith Miniplane

The Smith DSA-1 Miniplane ("Darn Small Aeroplane", "Darned Small Airplane", or "Damn Small Airplane") is a single-seat, single-engine sport aircraft designed in the United States in the 1950s and marketed for home building.

== Design ==
The Miniplane is a conventional single-bay biplane with staggered wings of unequal span braced with N-struts and wires. The Miniplane design has fixed undercarriage with a steerable tailwheel and although designed with an open cockpit, many have been fitted with canopies. The fuselage and the tail fin are of a conventional truss design constructed of welded steel tube and covered in fabric, and the wing spars and ribs are made from spruce and also fabric-covered. A variant has been built with an all-metal wing construction.

Engines used by builders are generally the 65-hp (48-kW) Continental A65, 85-hp (63-kW) Continental C85 or the Lycoming O-235 of 100 hp to 125 hp (75 kW to 93 kW).

== Development ==
Designer Frank Smith died of a heart attack shortly after completing the prototype. His wife, Dorothy, and son, Donald continued to market the plans into the 1970s and Donald worked on a two-seat version, the Miniplane +1.

In the late 1990s Sky Classic Aircraft of Des Moines, Iowa was developing an improved version of the Miniplane designated as the Smith Sport Miniplane. This model featured more cockpit room for larger pilots, a new airfoil and re-drawn plans to aid construction.

In 2010, Sky Classic Aircraft of Des Moines, Iowa marketed plans for another updated version of the Miniplane, the Miniplane 2000. The Miniplane 2000 incorporates several modifications to the original design, including a slightly longer and wider fuselage to accommodate larger pilots, adding bracing struts to reinforce the horizontal stabilizer, and changing the airfoil section and angles of incidence of the wings.

== Operational history ==
In August 1959, Tom Messick flew a Miniplane on a 4,200-mile (6,700-km) round trip to attend the EAA Fly-in at Rockford, Illinois and was awarded a trophy for flying the longest distance to the event.

The prototype DSA-1 is preserved at the EAA AirVenture Museum. Originally lent to the museum by Dorothy and Donald Smith in 1973, Donald donated the aircraft in 1988 in memory of his mother.

== Variants ==
DSA-1 Miniplane
original single-seat version by Frank Smith
Miniplane +1
two-seat version by Donald Smith
Miniplane 2000
updated version by Sky Classic Aircraft
Sport Miniplane
updated version from the late 1990s by Sky Classic Aircraft, with more cockpit room for larger pilots, a new airfoil and re-drawn plans.

== Specifications (DSA-1 prototype) ==
Data from Taylor 1977, p.561, and Plane & Pilot 1978, p.153 except as noted

General characteristics

- Crew: One pilot
- Length: 15 ft 3 in (4.65 m)
- Wingspan: 17 ft 0 in (5.18 m)
- Height: 5 ft 0 in (1.52 m)
- Wing area: 100 sq ft (9.29 m^{2})
- Empty weight: 616 lb (279 kg)
- Gross weight: 1,000 lb (454 kg)
- Powerplant: 1 × Lycoming O-235-C , 108 hp (81 kW)

Performance

- Maximum speed: 135 mph (217 km/h, 117 kn)
- Cruise speed: 122 mph (198 km/h, 106 kn)
- Stall speed: 56 mph (91 km/h, 49 kn)
- Range: 300 mi (480 km, 260 nmi)
- Service ceiling: 13,000 ft (3,960 m)
- Rate of climb: 1,600 ft/min (8.1 m/s)

== See also ==
- Per Il Volo Miniplane - a paramotor the same model name

Aircraft of comparable role, configuration, and era

- Hu-Go Craft
- Meyer Little Toot
- Payne Knight Twister
- Oldfield Baby Great Lakes
