= Per Il Volo Miniplane =

Italian paramotor

Miniplane
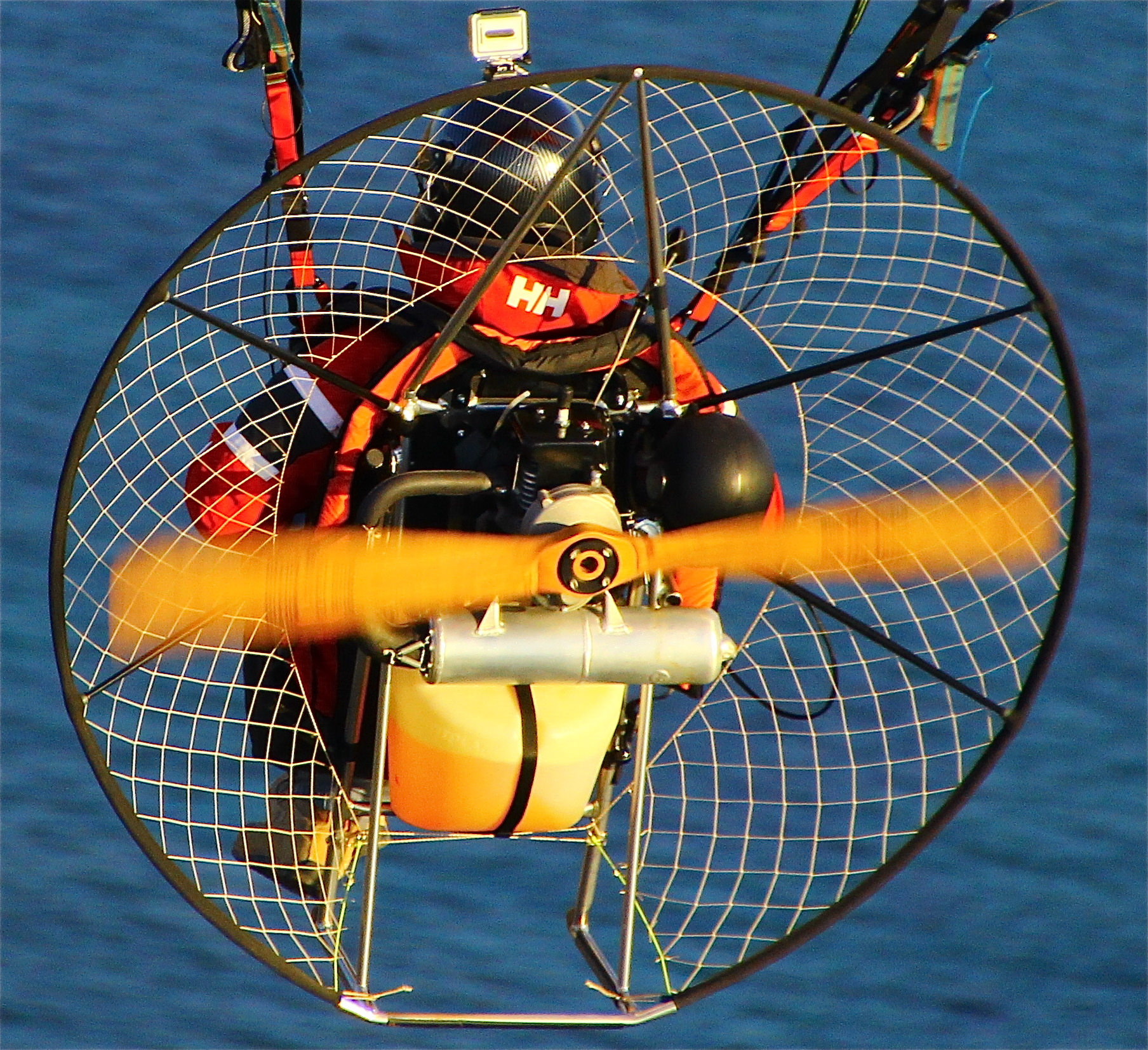

General information
- Type: Paramotor
- National origin: Italy
- Manufacturer: Per Il Volo
- Status: In production

History
- Introduction date: 1989

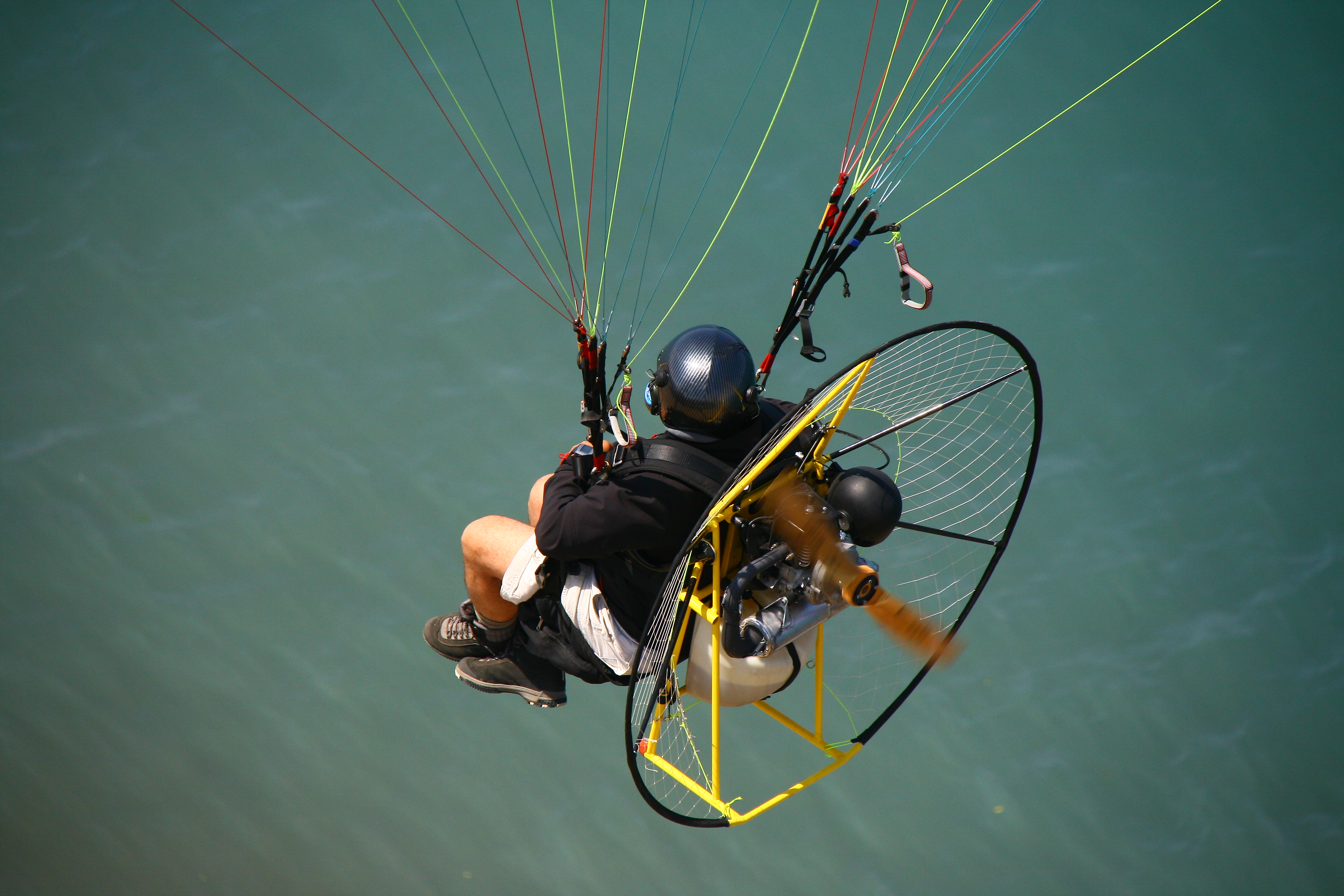
Miniplane showing the Top 80 engine

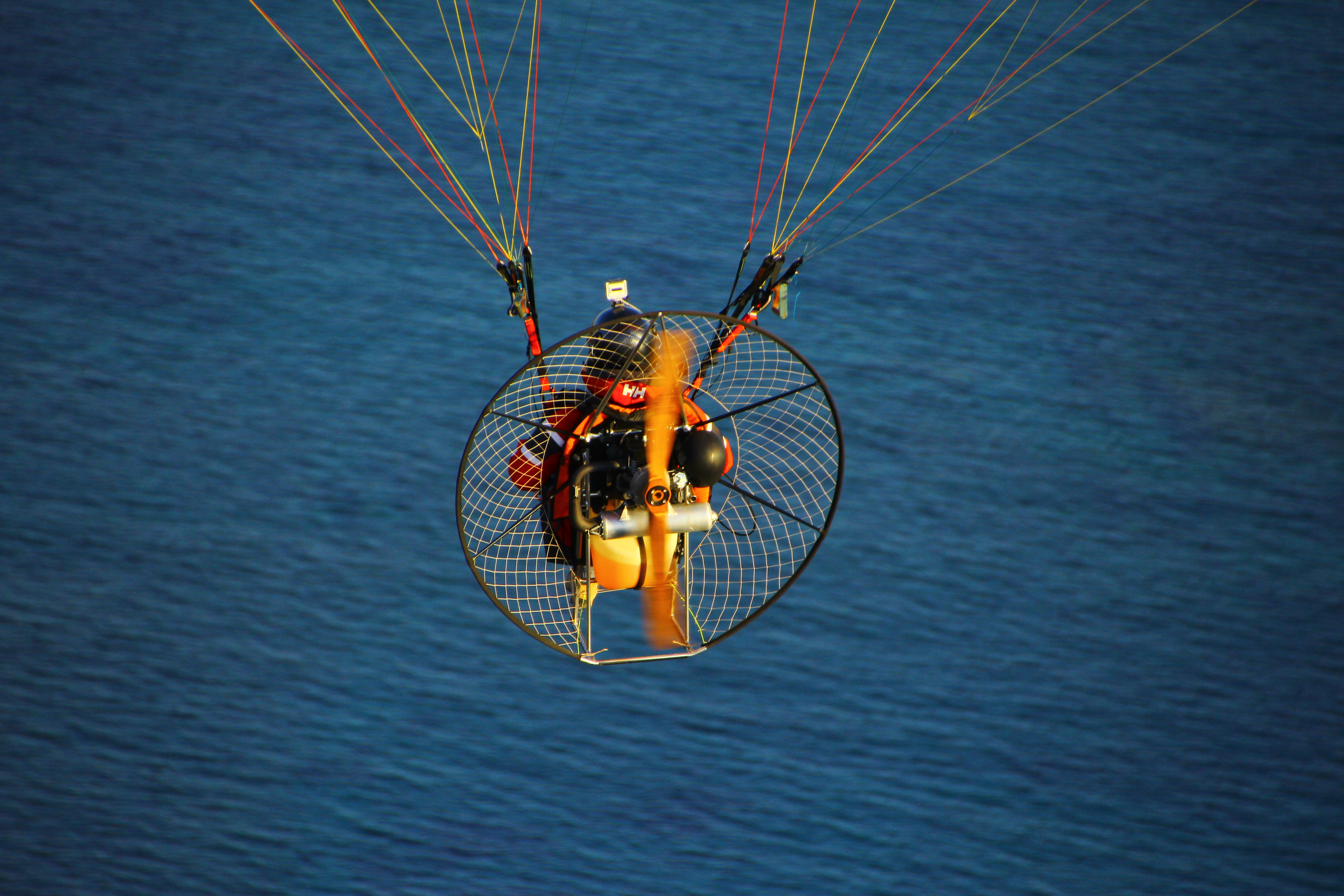
Miniplane

The Per Il Volo Miniplane is an Italian paramotor designed and produced by Per Il Volo of Galliera Veneta for powered paragliding. It was introduced in 1989 and remains in production.

== Design and development ==
The aircraft was designed as a lightweight paramotor, giving due consideration to the fact that the pilot has to wear the engine on his or her back and run with it for take-off. It features a paraglider-style high-wing, single-place accommodation and a single Per Il Volo Top 80 13 hp (10 kW) engine in pusher configuration. As is the case with all paramotors, take-off and landing is accomplished by foot.

To keep the design as light as possible, a simple harness is used. The single-cylinder, two-stroke, fan-cooled aircraft engine incorporates some unique features that make it especially suitable for its role. Its reduction gearbox results in the engine and propeller turning in different directions, thereby reducing the resulting torque absorbed by the pilot. The engine also incorporates a centrifugal clutch that allows the engine to idle without the propeller turning, which improves safety during canopy inflation and launch, as well as landing.

The aircraft can be completely disassembled for ground transportation or storage. The aluminum and fibreglass frame folds and the fuel tank is removable.

== Variants ==
Miniplane 115
Version with smaller propeller with a diameter of 115 cm (3.77 ft).
Miniplane 125
Version with larger propeller with a diameter of 125 cm (4.10 ft).
Miniplane LR 150

== Specifications (Miniplane 125) ==
Data from Cliche and Bertrand

General characteristics

- Crew: one
- Empty weight: 17 kg (37 lb)
- Gross weight: 113 kg (250 lb)
- Fuel capacity: 2 U.S. gallons (7.6 L; 1.7 imp gal)
- Powerplant: 1 × Per Il Volo Top 80 single cylinder, two-stroke, fan-cooled, 80cc aircraft engine with reduction gear box in rations from 3.18 to 4.41:1, 9.7 kW (13 hp)
- Propellers: 2-bladed wooden, 1.25 m (4 ft 1 in) diameter

Performance

- Cruise speed: 32 km/h (20 mph, 17 kn)
- Rate of climb: 2.0 m/s (400 ft/min)

== See also ==
- Smith Miniplane, a biplane with the same model name
