= Great Lakes Sport Trainer =

American biplane trainer and aerobatic aircraft

Sport Trainer
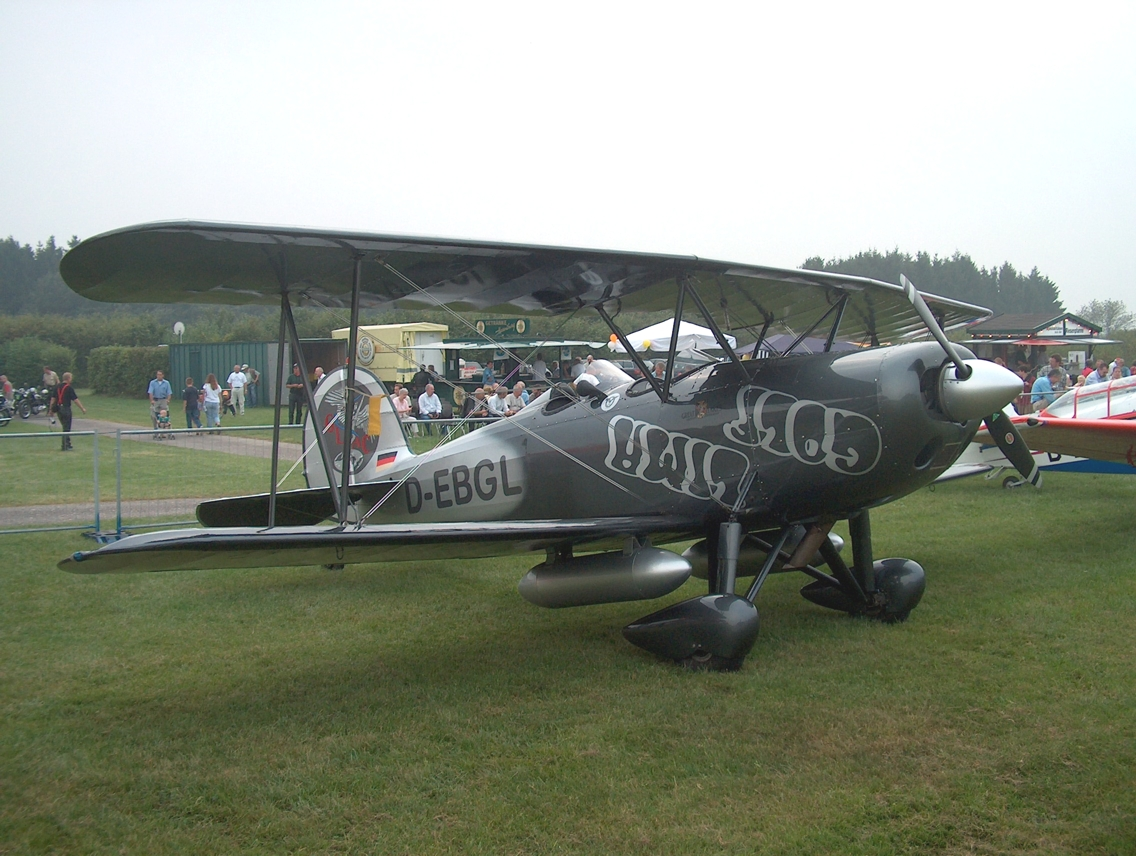
- Great Lakes 2T-1A-1

General information
- Type: Trainer/Tourer
- Manufacturer: Great Lakes Aircraft Company, WACO Classic Aircraft

History
- Manufactured: 1929–1933, 1973–1982, 2011–
- First flight: 1929

The Great Lakes Sport Trainer is an American biplane trainer and aerobatic aircraft. It was originally produced in large numbers before the company building it went bankrupt in the Great Depression in 1933. Owing to its continuing popularity, however, it was eventually placed back into production in the 1970s and again in 2011 by WACO Classic Aircraft.

== Development and design ==
The Great Lakes Aircraft Corporation of Cleveland, Ohio, produced a design for a small two-seat sports/trainer in early 1929, with the first prototype flying in March 1929. The resulting aircraft, designated 2-T-1, was a single bay biplane of mixed, fabric-covered construction and with a tailskid undercarriage. Because Allied Motor Industries, the holding company that owned Great Lakes, also owned the American Cirrus Company, all Sport Trainers were originally sold with Cirrus engines--in the case of the 2-T-1, a single 85 hp (63 kW) Cirrus III inline engine. Initial testing showed that the aircraft was tail heavy, and had trouble recovering from a flat spin; to resolve these issues, after the first four aircraft were built, the upper wing was swept back. The planes were initially marketed at a price of $4,990, but as the Great Depression set in, to keep units moving, the price was lowered to $3,985.

== Operational history ==
The aircraft proved very successful, with 262 built before construction ended as a result of the closure of Great Lakes due to the Great Depression. It was highly maneuverable even on the relatively modest power of a Cirrus engine. A 1929 Great Lakes Model 2T1a held for many years the world record for consecutive outside loops, a total of 131, set by Jim Moss flying the Hunt Special which by the early 1930s had been highly modified and re-powered with a Warner Scarab 165 7 cylinder radial engine.

The Great Lakes continued to be popular well after production ended, and many aircraft adopted more powerful engines, particularly the Jacobs radial engines. Eventually, in the 1960s, the rights for the Sport Trainer were acquired by Harvey Swack, who offered plans of the aircraft for sale to homebuilders. In 1972, Swack sold the rights on to Doug Champlin, who set up a reconstituted Great Lakes Aircraft Company to produce a revised version meeting the current airworthiness requirements, powered by modern Lycoming engines and revised materials of construction (including the use of Douglas fir instead of spruce). The first of the new production aircraft, the Model 2T-1A-1, powered by a 140 hp (100 kW) engine was certified in May 1973, with production starting in October that year. A more powerful version, the 2T-1A-2 followed in July 1974. In 1978, production was divided between Wichita, Kansas, and Enid, Oklahoma, with the intent on relocation to Florida, but production by Great Lakes Aircraft at Wichita and Enid ended that year, with 137 built.

Rights to the Sport Trainer continued to switch hands, resulting in production moving several times. In 1979, rights were acquired by Dean Franklin, who moved production to Eastman, Georgia. Production restarted at Eastman in 1980, but ended in 1982. In 1984 the company was brought out by John LaBelle, and moved to Claremont, New Hampshire, with production restarting that year, but production ended again in 1985.

In January 2011, WACO Classic Aircraft announced that it will put the Great Lakes Model 2T-1A-1/2 model biplane back into production. The aircraft had not been available since 1980. The aircraft will incorporate several changes including metal wing spars. It will be offered in two models, a touring model, with a Lycoming IO-360-B1F6 engine and a higher-performance sport model, with a Lycoming AEIO-360-B1G6 engine. Work on the new production model was completed in June 2013 and the base price announced as US$245,000. Waco had built 20 Sport Trainers by 2022.

== Variants ==
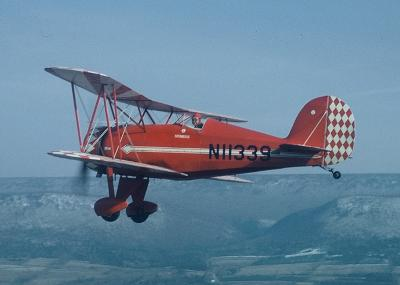
Great Lakes 2T-1A

Model 2T-1
Original production. 85 hp (63 kW) American Cirrus III engine. Small tail. Approximately 40 built.
Model 2T-1A
Revised version with enlarged tail surfaces and 90 hp (67 kW) American Cirrus Ace engine. About 200 built.
Model 2T-1A-1
New production (1973 on) version. Powered by 140 hp (104 kW) Lycoming O-320 engine.
Model 2T-1A-2
More powerful version - powered by 180 hp (134 kW) Lycoming IO-360 engine.
Model 2T-1A-E
Homebuilt Experimental Plans-built
Model 2T-1E
95 hp (71 kW) American Cirrus Ensign engine. About twelve built.
X
A 2T-1E used for aero-engine testing.
Model 2T-1MS
Menasco Pirate powered two-seat version, one example (registration of NC 304Y) airworthy at Old Rhinebeck Aerodrome is fitted with Goodyear "airwheel" low-pressure main gear tires, and was a favorite aircraft of Cole Palen, the museum's founder.
Model 2T-1R
Homebuilt variant with a 200 hp (150 kW) Ranger 6-440-5.
Model 2T-2 Speedster
Racing version of 2T-1-A. Powered by 95 hp (71 kW) Cirrus Hi-Drive and straight top wing. Later rebuilt as Model 2T-1E.

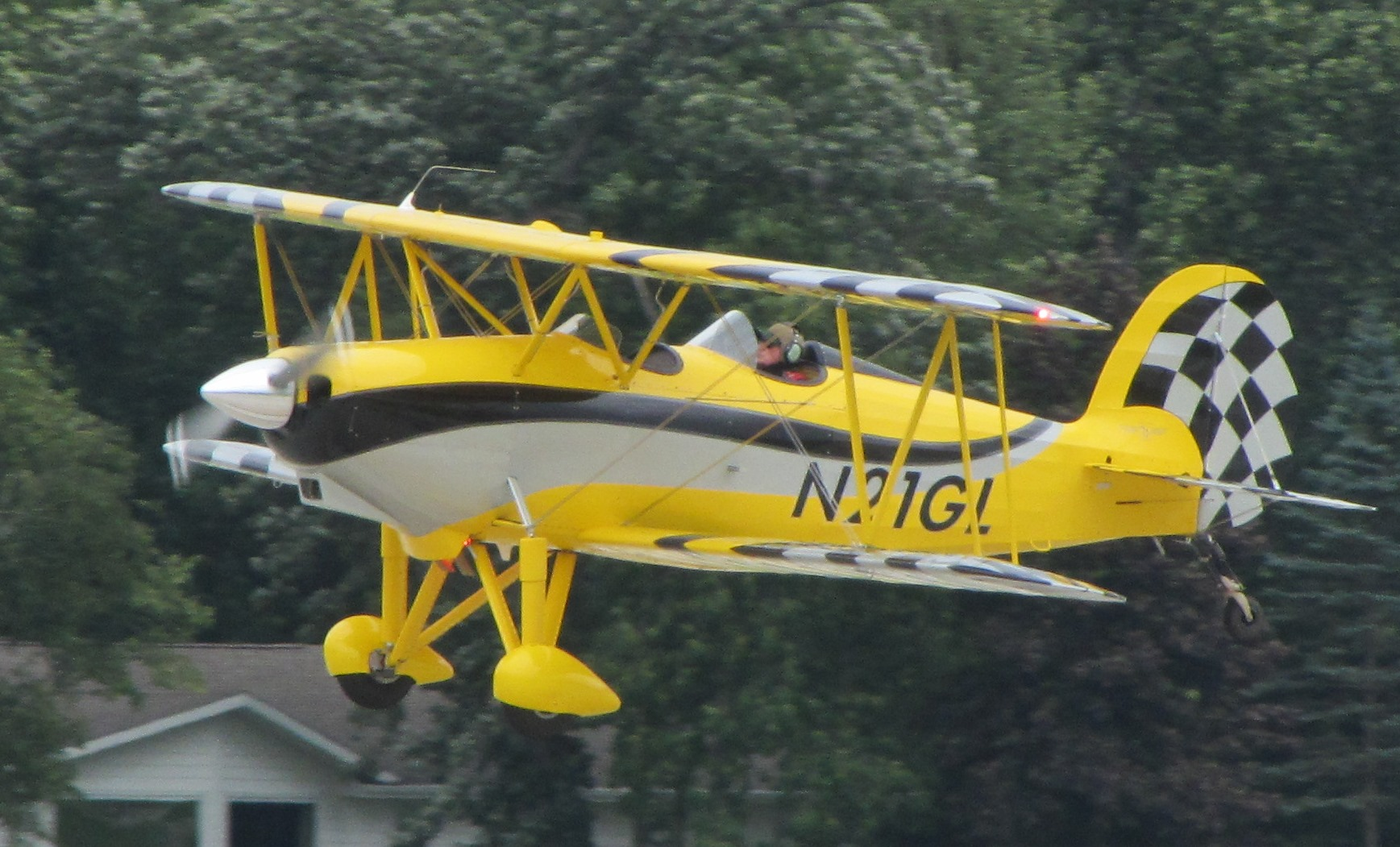
2013 Great Lakes 2T-1A-2

WACO Classic 2T-1A-1/2
New production model starting in 2011. There will be two models, a touring model, with a Lycoming IO-360-B1G6 engine and a higher-performance sport model, with a Lycoming AEIO-360-B1G6 engine

== Specifications (Model 2T-1A-2) ==
Data from Jane's All The World's Aircraft 1976-77

General characteristics

- Crew: 2
- Length: 20 ft 4 in (6.20 m)
- Wingspan: 26 ft 8 in (8.13 m)
- Height: 7 ft 4 in (2.24 m)
- Wing area: 187.6 sq ft (17.43 m^{2})
- Airfoil: M-12
- Empty weight: 1,230 lb (558 kg)
- Max takeoff weight: 1,800 lb (816 kg)
- Fuel capacity: 26 US gal (22 imp gal; 98 L)
- Powerplant: 1 × Lycoming IO-360-B1F6 4-cylinder horizontally opposed air-cooled piston engine, 180 hp (130 kW)
- Propellers: 2-bladed Hartzell HC C2YK-4F/FC7666A constant speed propeller

Performance

- Maximum speed: 115 kn (132 mph, 213 km/h) at sea level
- Cruise speed: 102 kn (117 mph, 189 km/h) (max. cruise)
- Stall speed: 50 kn (58 mph, 93 km/h)
- Range: 260 nmi (300 mi, 480 km)
- Service ceiling: 17,000 ft (5,200 m)
- Rate of climb: 1,400 ft/min (7.1 m/s)
- Take-off run to 50 ft (15 m): 1,100 ft (335 m)
- Landing run from 50 ft (15 m): 1,200 ft (366 m)

== See also ==
Aircraft of comparable role, configuration, and era

- Bücker Bü 133 Jungmeister
- Bucker Jungmann
- Levente II
- Oldfield Baby Great Lakes – a scaled down homebuilt based on the Sport Trainer
- Pitts S-2
