= Oldfield Baby Great Lakes =

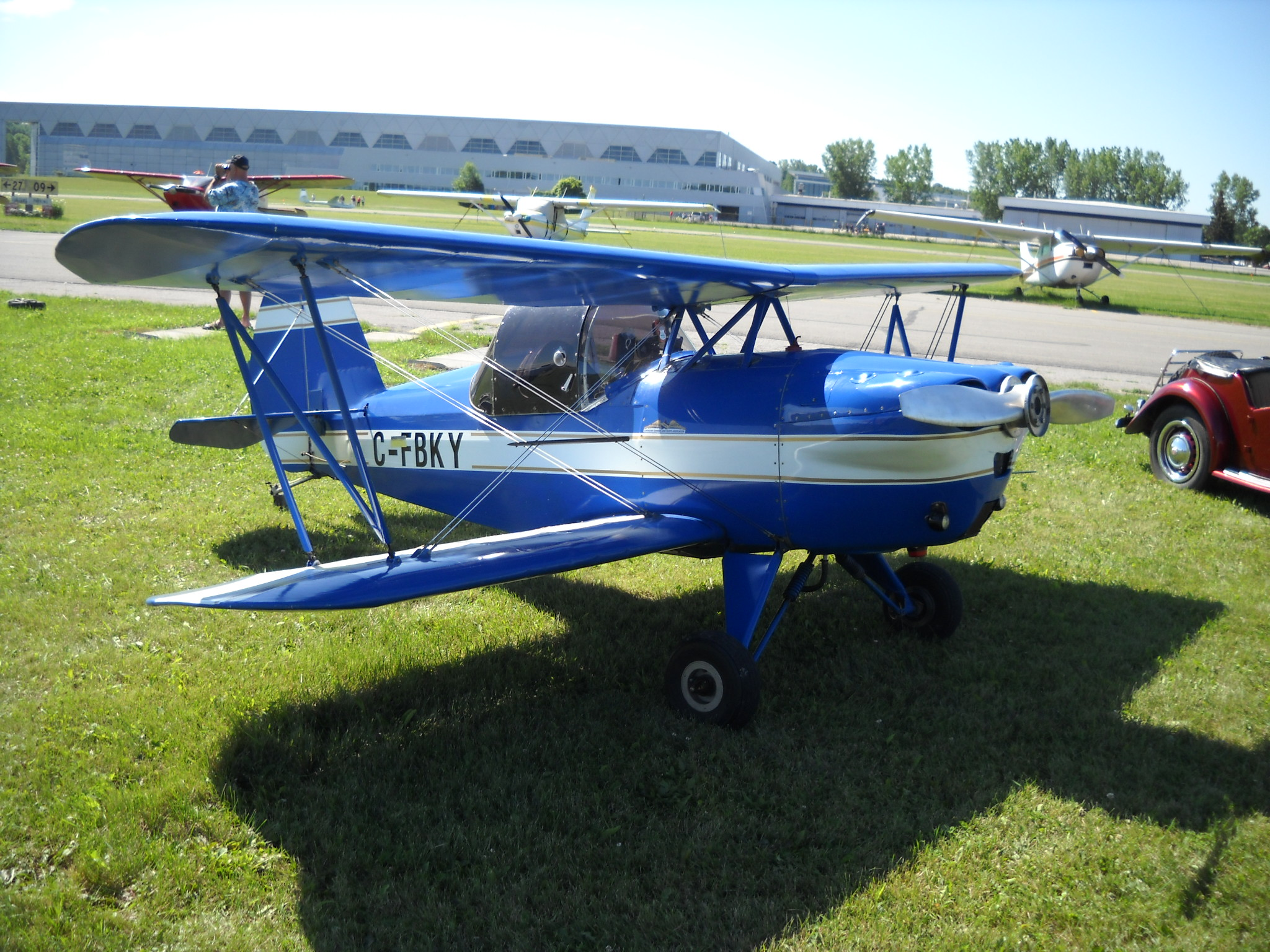

General information
- Type: Sport Aircraft
- National origin: United States of America
- Manufacturer: Barney Oldfield Aircraft Company
- Designer: Andrew Oldfield

The Oldfield Baby Great Lakes is a homebuilt sport biplane. The aircraft has many known names, including the Baby Lakes, Oldfield Baby Lakes, Baby Great Lakes, Super Baby Lakes, Super Baby Great Lakes, and Buddy Baby Lakes

== Design and development ==
The Baby Great Lakes was designed by Barney Oldfield, and originally built by Richard Lane, to be a scaled-down homebuilt derivative of the Great Lakes Sport Trainer.

The Baby Great Lakes is built using 136 ft (41.5 m) of steel tubing for the fuselage with aircraft fabric covering. The wings use spruce spars. The aircraft can accommodate engines ranging from the Continental A-65 to the Volkswagen air-cooled engine.

== Operational history ==
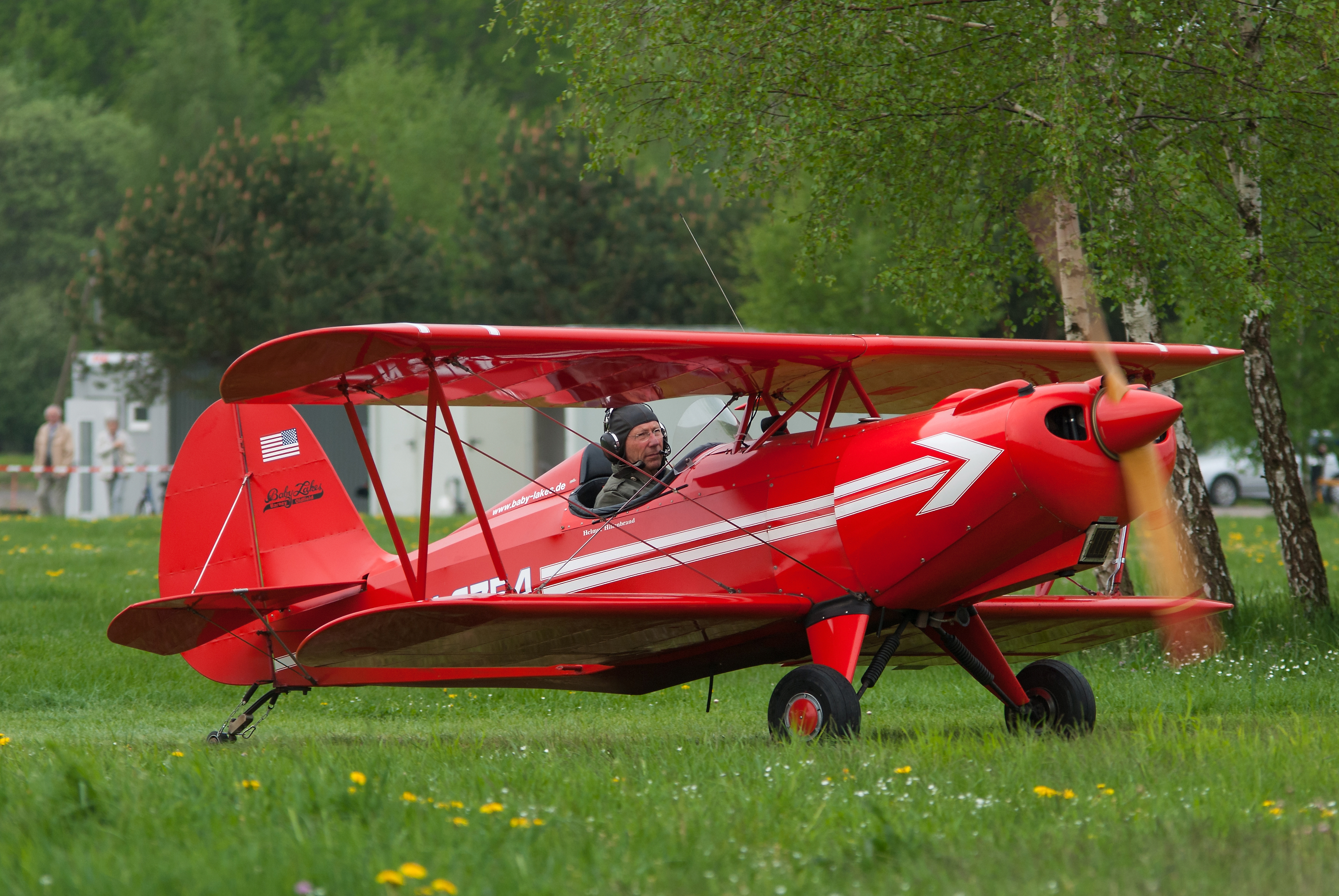
Oldfield Baby Great Lakes

The prototype was not intended to be produced in quantity, but enough plans were requested that the aircraft was marketed as a homebuilt design. The rights to the Baby Great Lakes were acquired by Aircraft Spruce & Specialty Co in May 1996.

== Variants ==
Super Baby Lakes
Accommodates engines over 100 hp (75 kW)
Buddy Baby Lakes
Two-place variant

== Specifications (Oldfield Baby Great Lakes - 80 hp A80 engine) ==
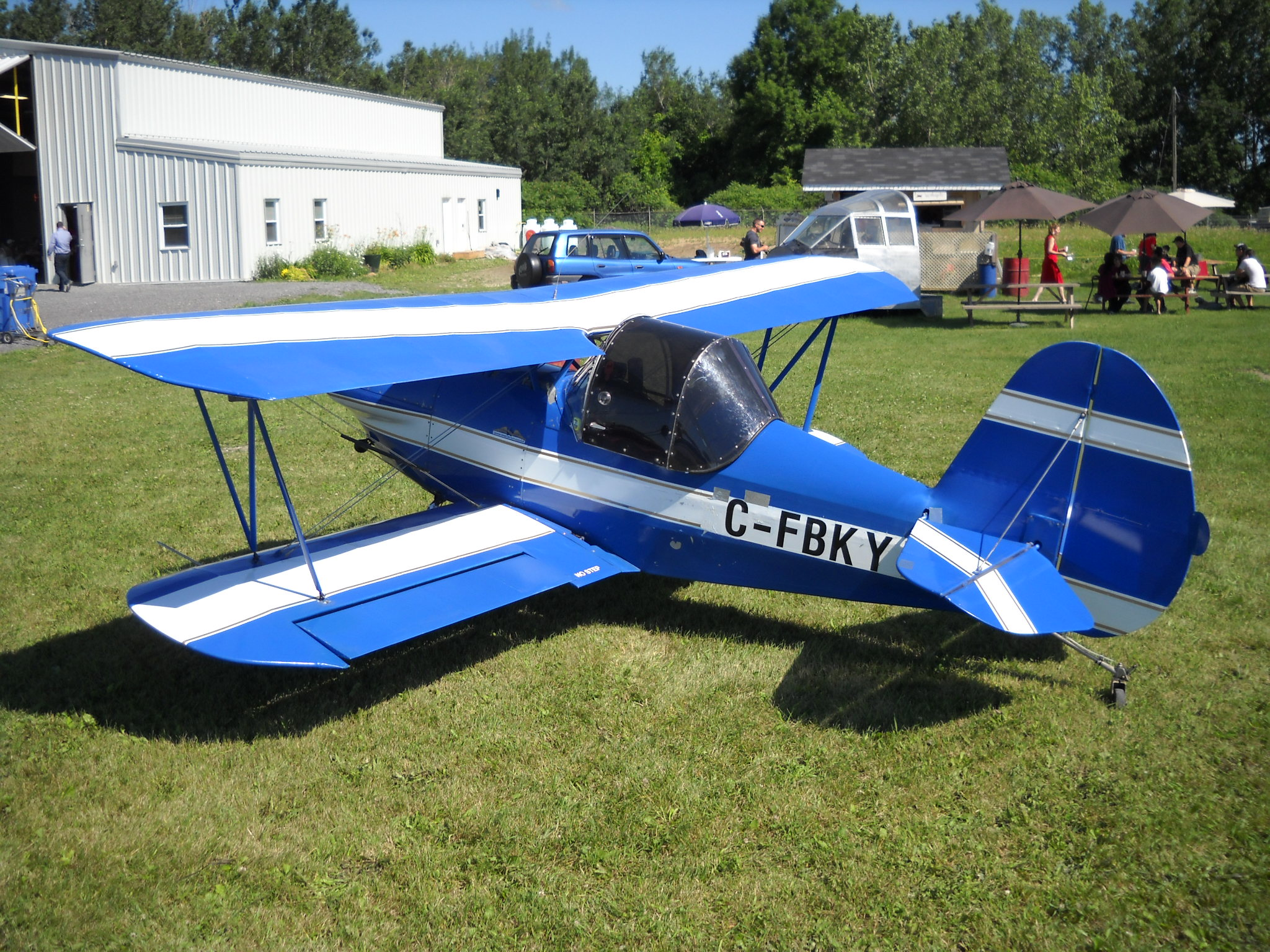
Oldfield Baby Great Lakes with canopy fitted

Data from Jane's All the World's Aircraft 1988–89

General characteristics

- Crew: one
- Length: 13 ft 9 in (4.19 m)
- Wingspan: 16 ft 8 in (5.08 m)
- Height: 4 ft 6 in (1.37 m)
- Wing area: 86.0 sq ft (7.99 m^{2})
- Empty weight: 475 lb (215 kg)
- Gross weight: 850 lb (386 kg)
- Fuel capacity: 12 US gal (10.0 imp gal; 45 L)
- Powerplant: 1 × Continental A-80 Horizontally opposed piston, 80 hp (60 kW)

Performance

- Maximum speed: 117 kn (135 mph, 217 km/h) at sea level
- Cruise speed: 103 kn (118 mph, 190 km/h)
- Stall speed: 43 kn (50 mph, 80 km/h)
- Service ceiling: 17,000 ft (5,200 m)
- g limits: ± 9g
- Rate of climb: 2,000 ft/min (10 m/s)

== See also ==
- Great Lakes Aircraft Company
- Great Lakes Sport Trainer
