= 700s =

700s may refer to:

- The period from 700 to 799, almost synonymous with the 8th century (701–800).
- The period from 700 to 709, known as the 700s decade, almost synonymous with the 71st decade (701-710).
- Gobosh 700S, American light-sport aircraft
