= 800XP =

800XP may refer to:

- Gobosh 800XP, American light-sport aircraft
- Hawker 800XP, American business jet aircraft
