= Aero AT =

Polish aircraft manufacturer

Aero AT Sp.z o.o.
- Company type: Spółka z ograniczoną odpowiedzialnością
- Industry: Aerospace
- Founded: 1994
- Founder: Tomasz Antoniewski
- Headquarters: Warsaw, Poland
- Products: Ultralight aircraft

Aero AT Sp.z o.o. is a Polish light aircraft manufacturer founded by Tomasz Antoniewski in Warsaw in 1994. It is unrelated to the Czech Aero company.

The company is organized as a Spółka z ograniczoną odpowiedzialnością (Sp.z o.o.), a Polish private limited company.

The company was founded to develop and market a two-seat aircraft specifically for the flight training and touring market. The result of this venture was the Aero AT-3, type certified by European Aviation Safety Agency in May 1999 under the EASA CS-VLA rules, only the sixth aircraft type to receive this certification. The first five production aircraft were delivered to customers in 2002. A version for the light-sport aircraft market was accepted by the Federal Aviation Administration and marketed as the Gobosh 700 in the United States.

== Aircraft ==
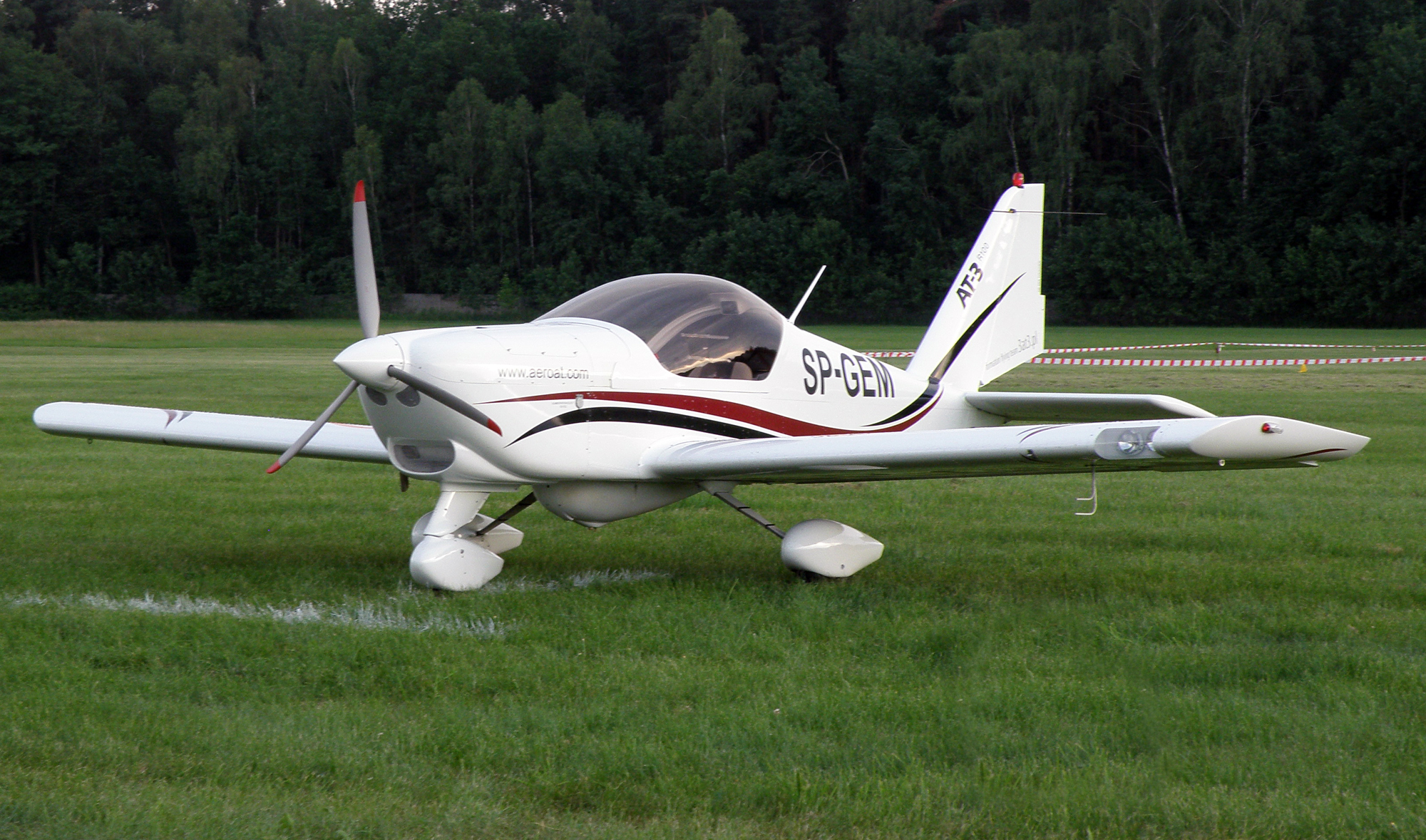
Aero AT-3

- Aero AT-1
- Aero P220S AT-2
- Aero AT-3 (1997) – Single-engine two-seat low-wing Very Light Aircraft (VLA) with fixed tricycle undercarriage. Marketed in Europe in two versions - the SK (Standard Kit) and the R100. The Gobosh 700S is a version marketed in the U.S.
- Aero AT-3S (S for Sport) was launched at the Aero Friedrichshafen 2017. Weighing just 600 kg, it is a refined variant of the AT-4.
- Aero AT-4
