= JMB VL-3 Sprint =

Czech ultralight aircraft

VL-3 Sprint
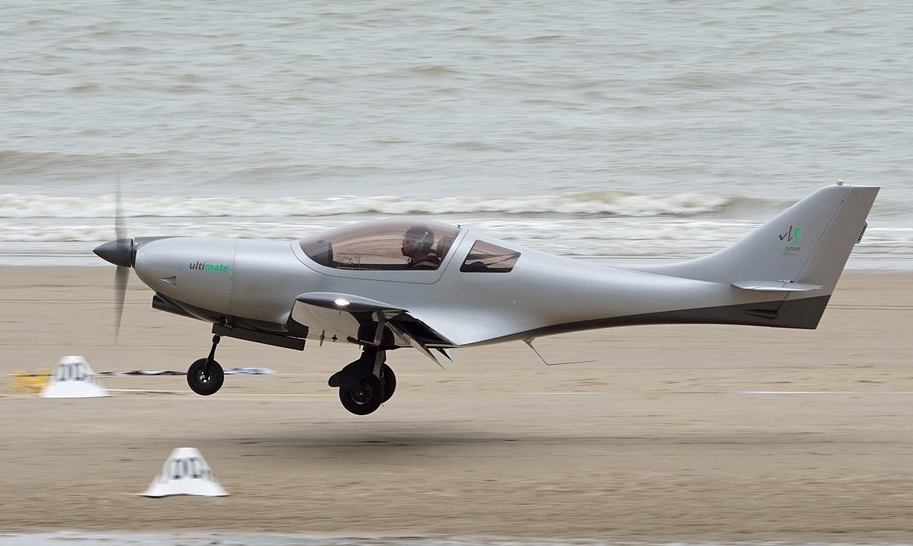
- VL-3 Sprint RG

General information
- Type: Ultralight aircraft
- National origin: Czech Republic
- Manufacturer: Aveko; JMB Aircraft
- Status: In production

History
- First flight: 6 June 2004
- Variant: Gobosh 800XP

The VL-3 Evolution also called the Aveko VL-3 Sprint is a Czech ultralight aircraft, designed and initially produced by Aveko of Brno. The design is now produced by JMB Aircraft of Choceň. The aircraft was originally supplied by Aveko complete ready-to-fly, but is now owner-completed through a factory assistance program.

== Design and development ==
The aircraft was designed to comply with the Fédération Aéronautique Internationale microlight rules. It features a cantilever low-wing a two-seats-in-side-by-side configuration enclosed cockpit, fixed or retractable tricycle landing gear and a single engine in tractor configuration.

The aircraft is made from composites. Its 8.44 m (27.7 ft) span wing has a small wing area of 9.77 m^{2} (105.2 sq ft). The standard engine is the 100 hp (75 kW) Rotax 912ULS four-stroke powerplant.

A fixed gear version with a larger wing span and area as well as a higher gross weight was developed for the US light-sport aircraft category and was marketed from about 2009 to 2016 by Gobosh Aviation as the Gobosh 800XP. By 2016 the Gobosh Aviation company website had been taken down and the company had likely gone out of business.

== Operational history ==
A VL-3 set a world two-seat ultralight class record of 274.78 km/h (170.74 mph) in 2005.

== Variants ==
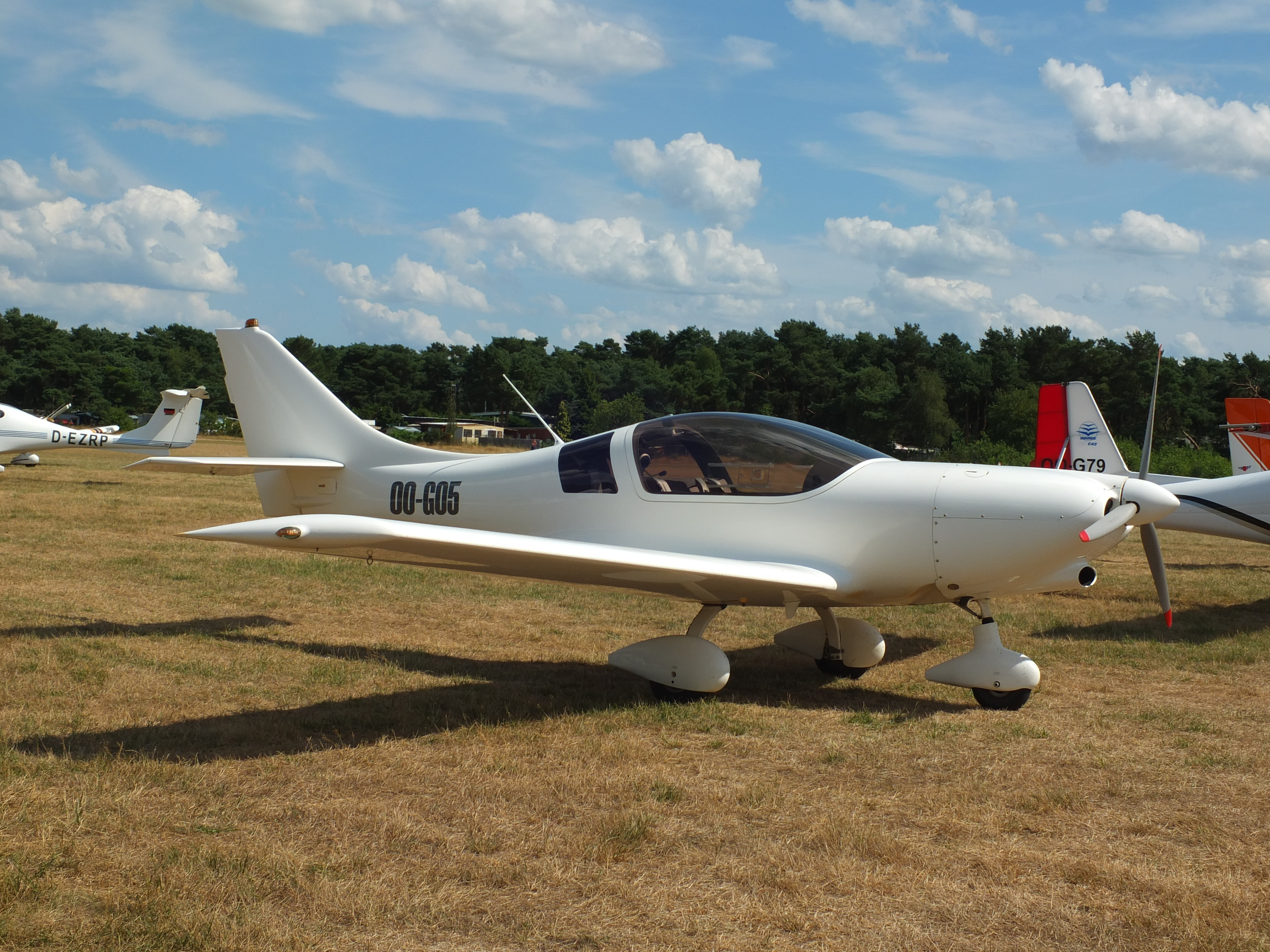
Aveko VL-3 FG Sprint

VL-3 FG
Fixed landing gear model
VL-3 RG
Retractable landing gear model
VL-3C-1
Model with fixed landing gear and a slower wing and 600 kg (1,323 lb) take-off weight for the light-sport aircraft category.

== Specifications (VL-3 Sprint) ==
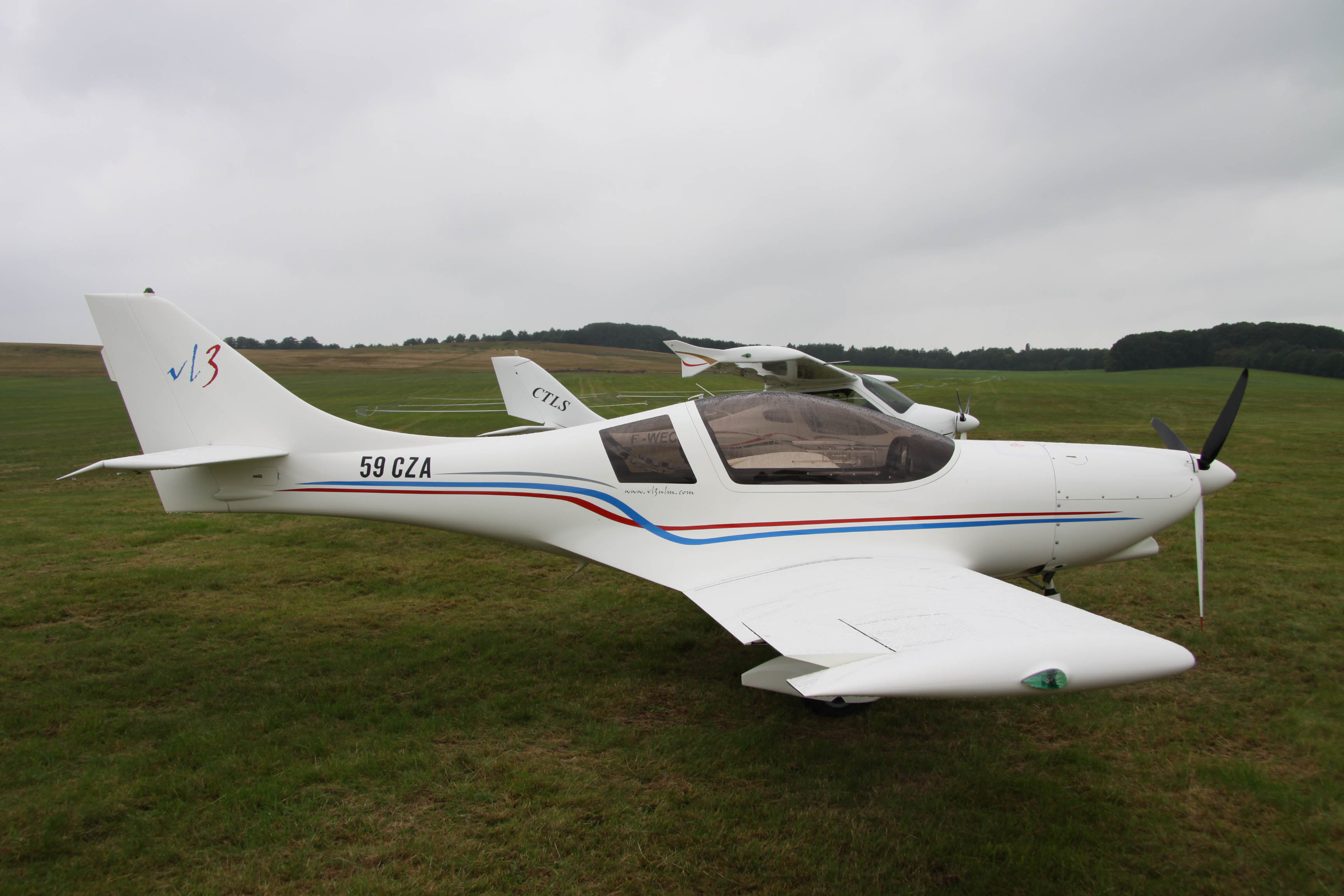
Aveko VL-3 FG Sprint

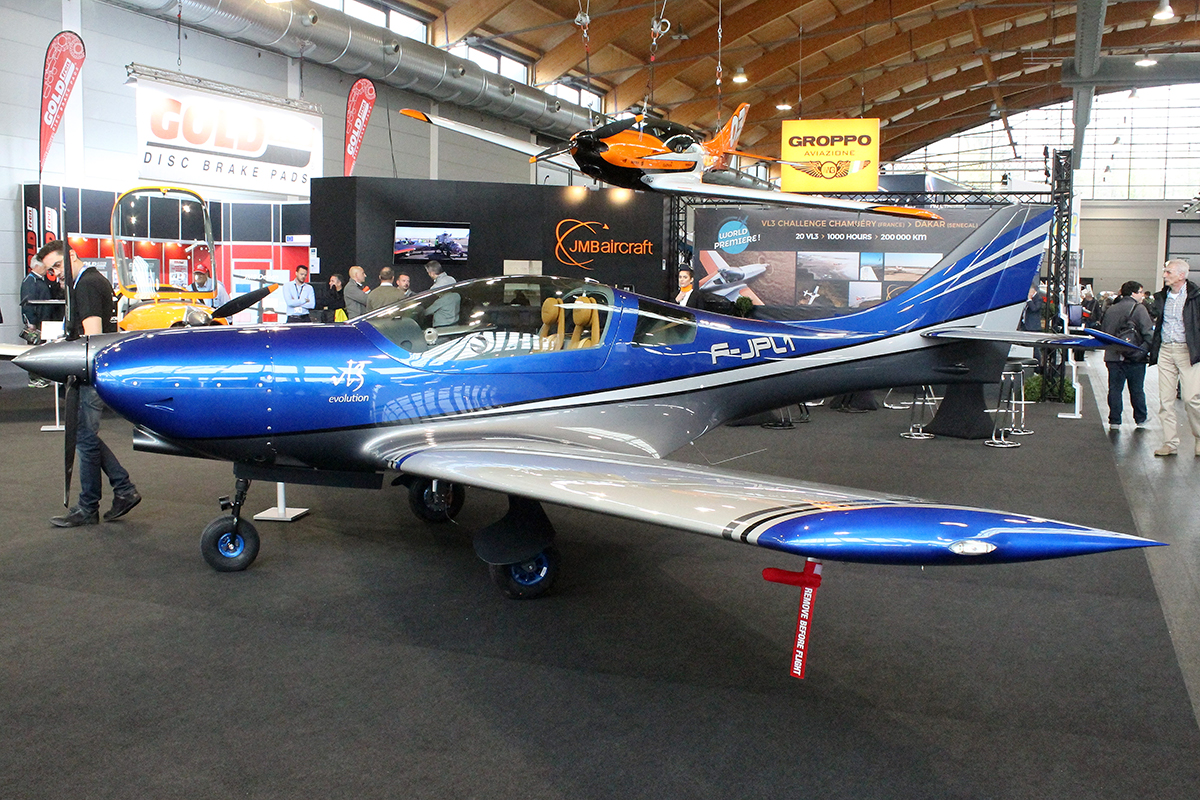
JMB VL-3 Evolution RG at AERO Friedrichshafen 2019

Data from Bayerl and JMB Aircraft

General characteristics

- Crew: one
- Capacity: one passenger
- Length: 6.24 m (20 ft 6 in)
- Wingspan: 8.44 m (27 ft 8 in)
- Height: 2.05 m (6 ft 9 in)
- Wing area: 9.77 m^{2} (105.2 sq ft)
- Empty weight: 290 kg (639 lb)
- Gross weight: 472.514144 kg (1,042 lb)
- Fuel capacity: 90 to 120 litres (20 to 26 imp gal; 24 to 32 US gal)
- Powerplant: 1 × Rotax 912ULS four cylinder, liquid and air-cooled, four stroke aircraft engine, 75 kW (101 hp)

Performance

- Maximum speed: 280 km/h (170 mph, 150 kn)
- Cruise speed: 250 km/h (160 mph, 130 kn)
- Stall speed: 53 km/h (33 mph, 29 kn)
- Never exceed speed: 305 km/h (190 mph, 165 kn)
- Range: 3,333 km (2,071 mi, 1,800 nmi)
- Rate of climb: 6 m/s (1,200 ft/min)
