= Aero AT-3 =

General aviation aircraft by Aero AT

AT-3
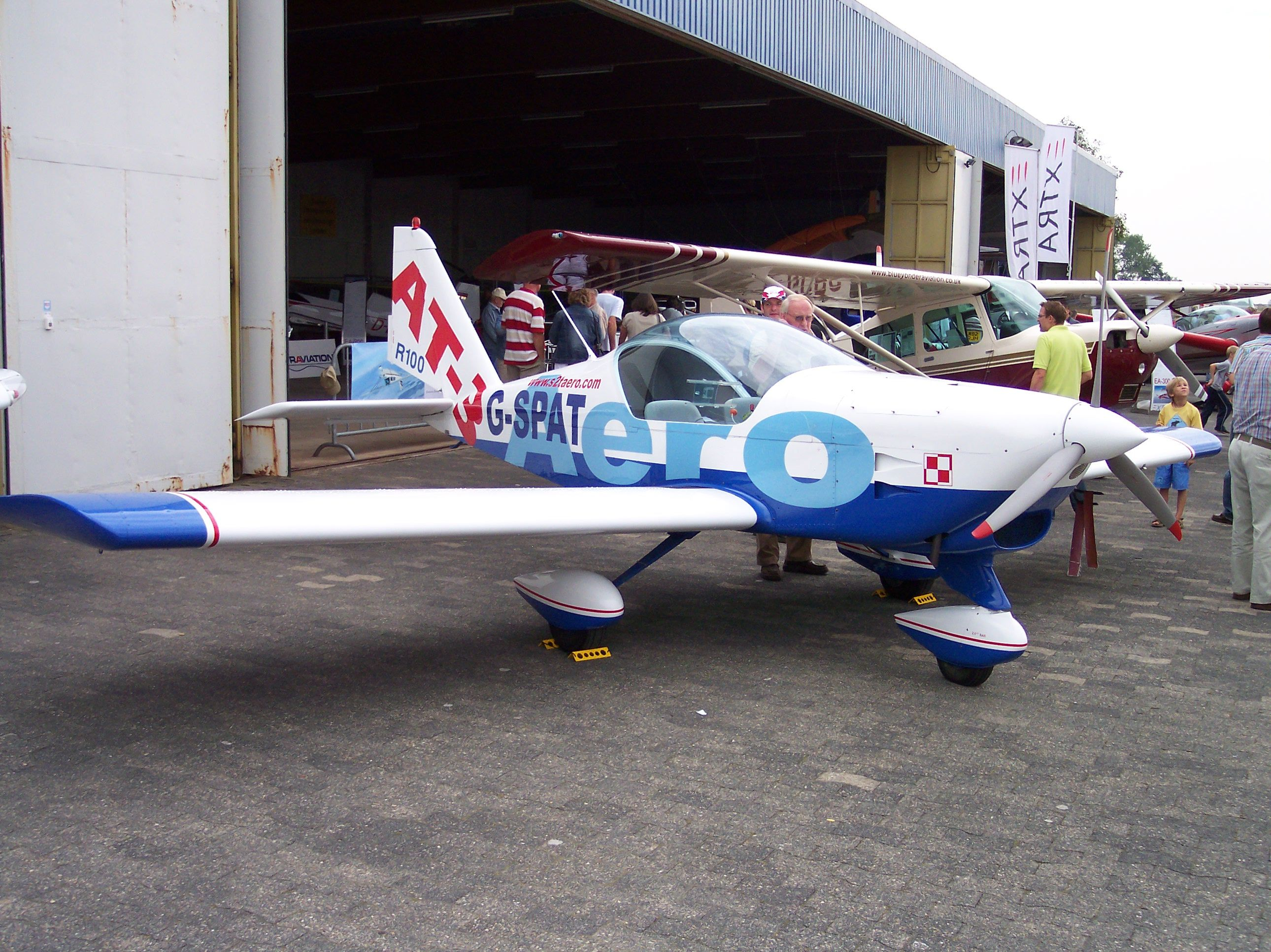

General information
- Type: Utility aircraft
- National origin: Poland
- Manufacturer: Aero AT
- Status: In production

History
- Introduction date: 2002
- First flight: 1997
- Developed from: Pottier P.220S Koala
- Variant: Gobosh 700S

The Aero AT-3 is a two-seat, low wing, utility aircraft manufactured in Poland by Aero AT in ready-to-fly certificated form and as a kitplane. The aircraft is of conventional configuration and features fixed tricycle undercarriage. The structure is largely of all-metal construction. Designed by Tomasz Antoniewski it first flew in 1997 and deliveries to customers commenced in 2002. It is certified under the European Very Light Aircraft regulations. On July 2, 2010 Aero AT-3 was granted an American Federal Aviation Administration type certificate, based on its European VLA certification.

== Design and development ==
The AT-3 R-100 is a single-engined low-wing cantilever monoplane of all-metal construction and a fixed tricycle landing gear. It is powered by a nose-mounted Bombardier-Rotax 912 with either a two-bladed wooden or three-bladed composite propeller.

=== Acquisition by Jiangsu LanTian Aerospace Industrial Park of China ===
In April 2013, the manufacturer of the AT-3 VLA and AT-4 LSA aircraft, Aero AT Sp. z o.o. was acquired by Jiangsu LanTian Aerospace Industrial Park of China. While production for the European and US markets is to remain in Mielec, Poland, a new assembly facility is being developed in China for the local Chinese Market. In early 2014 plans included production of more than 100 aircraft for Chinese customers by the end of 2015.

== Operational history ==
The first Aero AT-3s were supplied to the Aeroclub of Warsaw in Poland in the early 2000s. The first sales outside Poland were to the UK in 2004 (a total of 16 AT-3s have since been sold to the UK). The aircraft has also proved popular in France with a similar number of sales. Further examples operate in the Netherlands, Belgium, Germany, Switzerland, Sweden, Spain and Hungary. As of early 2014, approx 70 Aero AT-3 aircraft have been delivered to customers in Europe, North Africa and Asia. Over 20 LSA variants (AT-4) have been supplied to the North American market. The aircraft are primarily used by flight training organisations with a smaller number of private owners. Variants with glass cockpits and certified for Night VFR have also been delivered in recent years.

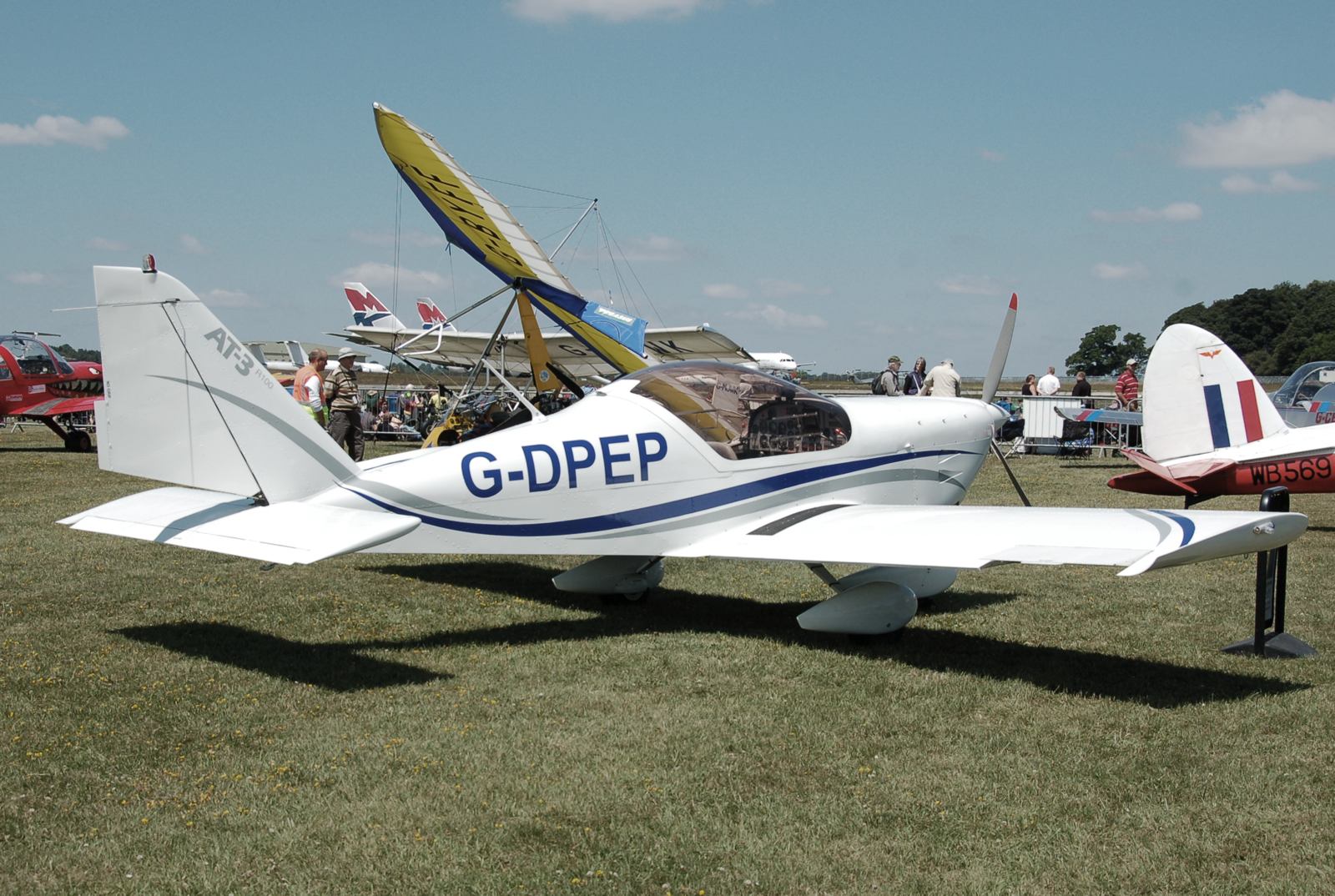
Aero AT-3 R100 at Cotswold Airport, Gloucestershire, England. (2010).

== Variants ==
AT-3 SK
Standard Kit, homebuilt variant.
AT-3 R100
Factory-built variant to EASA-VLA standards.
AT-4
Light-sport aircraft version for the US market, also sold as the Gobosh 700.

== Specifications (AT-3 R100) ==
Data from Jane's all the World's Aircraft 2004-05

General characteristics

- Crew: 1
- Capacity: 1 pax / student + 30 kg (66 lb) baggage rack behind seats
- Length: 5.88 m (19 ft 3 in)
- Wingspan: 7.55 m (24 ft 9 in)
- Height: 2.23 m (7 ft 4 in)
- Wing area: 9.3 m^{2} (100 sq ft)
- Empty weight: 350 kg (772 lb)

372 kg (820 lb) L100

- Max takeoff weight: 582 kg (1,283 lb)
- Fuel capacity: 70 L (18 US gal; 15 imp gal)
- Powerplant: 1 × Rotax 912S 4-cylinder air-cooled horizontally-opposed piston engine, 75 kW (101 hp)

74.6 kW (100.0 hp) Limbach L2400DF L100

- Propellers: 2-bladed MT-Propeller MT-165R-152-2M, 1.65 m (5 ft 5 in) diameter fixed-pitch propeller

MT-Propeller MT-165L-120-2C L100

Performance

- Maximum speed: 215 km/h (134 mph, 116 kn)

205 km/h (127 mph; 111 kn) L100

- Cruise speed: 200 km/h (120 mph, 110 kn)
- Stall speed: 83 km/h (52 mph, 45 kn)
- Never exceed speed: 223 km/h (139 mph, 120 kn)
- Maximum manoeuvring speed (V_{a}): 197 km/h (122 mph; 106 kn)
- Range: 904 km (562 mi, 488 nmi)
- Service ceiling: 3,800 m (12,500 ft)
- g limits: +3.8 -1.5
- Rate of climb: 3.7 m/s (730 ft/min)

3.5 m/s (11 ft/s) L100

- Wing loading: 62.6 kg/m^{2} (12.8 lb/sq ft) at MTOW
- Power/mass: 0.1263 kW/kg (0.0768 hp/lb)

0.128 kW/kg (0.078 hp/lb) L100

- Take-off run: 160 m (525 ft)

170 m (558 ft) L100

- Take-off run to 15 m (49 ft): 440 m (1,444 ft)

465 m (1,526 ft) L100

- Landing run: 150 m (492 ft)

160 m (525 ft) L100

- Landing run from 15 m (49 ft): 445 m (1,460 ft)

Avionics
Bendix/King KY 97A tx/rx

- VFR instruments standard / IFR instruments optional

== See also ==
Aircraft of comparable role, configuration, and era

- AMD Zodiac
