= Aero AT-1 =

1990s Polish civil utility aircraft

AT-1
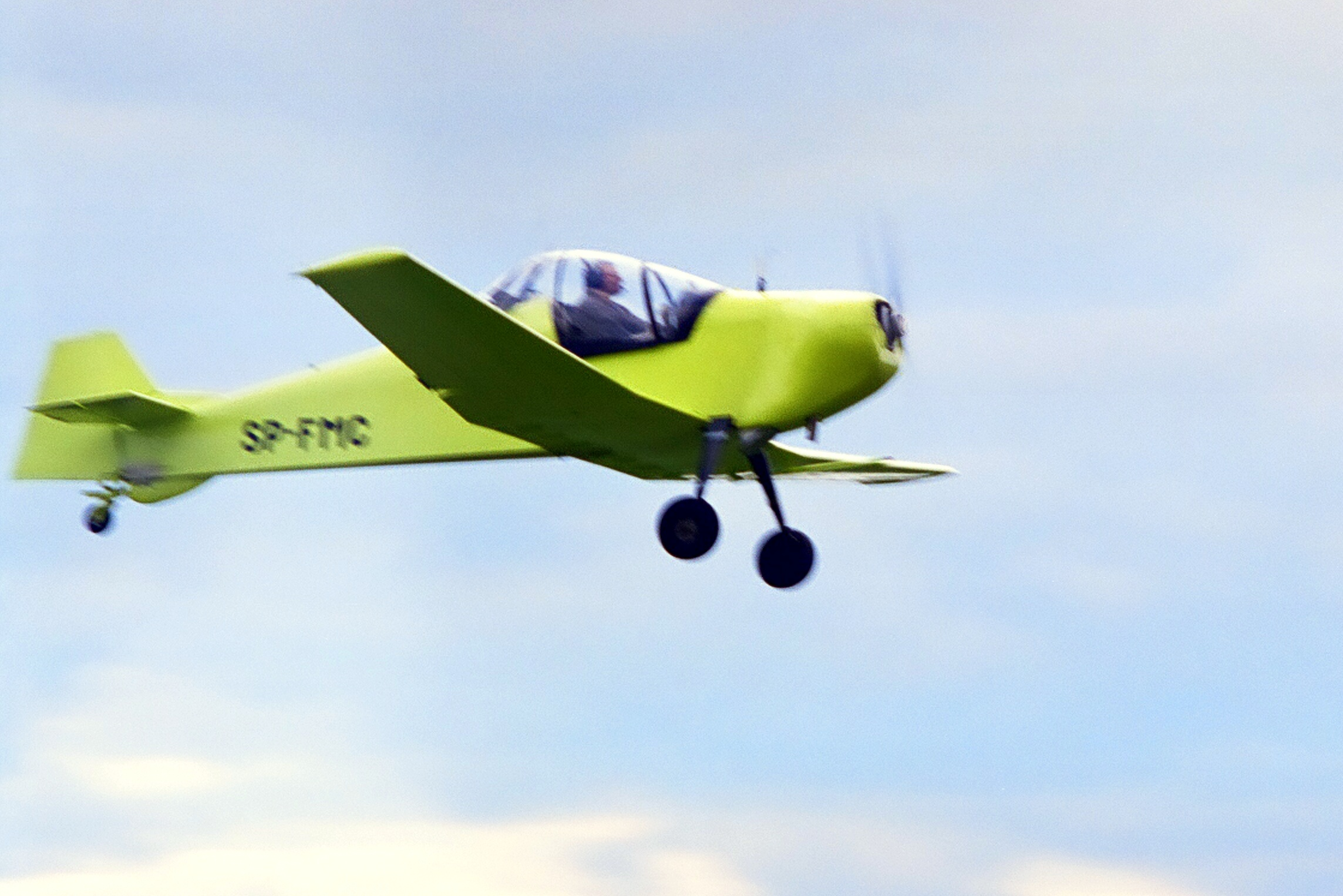

General information
- Type: Utility aircraft
- National origin: Poland
- Manufacturer: Aero AT
- Designer: Tomasz Antoniewski
- Status: In production
- Number built: 1

History
- First flight: 9 December 1990 (official)

The Aero AT-1, a.k.a. Antoniewski AT-1, is a two-seat, low wing, ultra-light sport aircraft, developed by Tomasz Antoniewski, manufactured in Poland by Aero AT in ready-to-fly certificated form and as a kitplane.

== Design and development ==
Antoniewski designed the AT-1, using the Jodel D.9 Bébé as a starting point, for his diploma thesis at the Faculty of Power and Aeronautical Engineering of the Warsaw University of Technology.

Retaining most of the fuselage structure, the wings were replaced with shortened SZD-30 Pirat wings of 10.6 m (35 ft) span. The 50 kg (110 lb) heavier wings required structural modifications to the fuselage and the adoption of undercarriage legs from a PZL-126 Mrówka, main landing gear wheels from the SZD-51 Junior and tail landing gear from the PZL-104 Wilga.

Construction began at Yalo in 1987 and by December 1989 the aircraft was almost ready, with only the engine covers missing, painting and other small parts required. The first short flights over Bemowo airport were carried out then. A proper, but still unofficial, flight was carried out in July 1990, but it was not until 9 December 1990 that the first AT-1 was officially flown by Maciej Aksler.

The AT-1 is a single-seat wooden low wing monoplane, with fabric and plywood skinning. Initially flown with an open cockpit a canopy was later installed. Controls are entirely conventional, including a small fin with large rudderand similar construction to the wings. The tailwheel undercarriage has single leaf main undercarriage legs.

== Operational history ==
Initially used as intended, for recreational flying, the AT-1 was also used for banner-towing and forest fire-patrol from 1993 to 1996. The original AT-1 is currently stationed at the Pilski Aero Club.

== Specifications ==
Data from Aero AT-1 - SAMOLOTY.PL

General characteristics

- Crew: 1
- Length: 5.72 m (18 ft 9 in)
- Wingspan: 10.6 m (34 ft 9 in)
- Height: 1.95 m (6 ft 5 in)
- Airfoil: root:Wortmann FX 61-168; tip: Wortmann FX 60-126
- Empty weight: 315 kg (694 lb)
- Max takeoff weight: 430 kg (948 lb)
- Powerplant: 1 × Limbach SL 1700 EA 4-cylinder air-cooled horizontally-opposed piston engine, 44 kW (59 hp)
- Propellers: 2-bladed fixed-pitch propeller

Performance

- Maximum speed: 198 km/h (123 mph, 107 kn)
- Cruise speed: 160 km/h (99 mph, 86 kn)
- Stall speed: 80 km/h (50 mph, 43 kn)
- Range: 600 km (370 mi, 320 nmi)
- Rate of climb: 2.2 m/s (430 ft/min)
