= Gobosh 800XP =

American light sport aircraft

800XP

General information
- Type: Light-sport aircraft
- National origin: United States
- Manufacturer: Gobosh Aviation
- Status: Production completed

History
- Introduction date: 2008
- Developed from: Aveko VL-3 Sprint

The Gobosh 800XP is an American light-sport aircraft marketed by Gobosh Aviation of Moline, Illinois. The 800XP was introduced in 2008 and is supplied as a complete ready-to-fly-aircraft.

By 2016 the company website had been taken down and the company had likely gone out of business.

== Design and development ==
The 800XP is a development of the Aveko VL-3 Sprint, adapted to comply with the US light-sport aircraft rules, by increasing the wing area and raising the gross weight from 472.5 to 600 kg (1,042 to 1,323 lb). It features a cantilever low-wing, a two-seats-in-side-by-side configuration enclosed open cockpit under a forward-hinged bubble canopy, fixed tricycle landing gear and a single engine in tractor configuration.

The aircraft is made from composites. Its 36.5 ft (11.1 m) span wing has an area of 116 sq ft (10.8 m^{2}) and mounts winglets. The standard engine available is the 100 hp (75 kW) Rotax 912ULS four-stroke powerplant.

== Specifications (800XP) ==
Data from Bayerl

General characteristics

- Crew: one
- Capacity: one passenger
- Length: 20 ft 4 in (6.20 m)
- Wingspan: 36 ft 6 in (11.13 m)
- Height: 6 ft 11 in (2.11 m)
- Empty weight: 760 lb (345 kg)
- Gross weight: 1,320 lb (599 kg)
- Fuel capacity: 29 U.S. gallons (110 L; 24 imp gal)
- Powerplant: 1 × Rotax 912ULS four cylinder, liquid and air-cooled, four stroke aircraft engine, 100 hp (75 kW)
- Propellers: 2-bladed, 5 ft 8 in (1.73 m) diameter

Performance

- Cruise speed: 119 kn (137 mph, 220 km/h)
- Stall speed: 35 kn (40 mph, 65 km/h)
- Never exceed speed: 145 kn (167 mph, 269 km/h)
- Range: 630 nmi (730 mi, 1,170 km)
- Service ceiling: 13,200 ft (4,000 m)
- Rate of climb: 850 ft/min (4.3 m/s)
- Wing loading: 11.4 lb/sq ft (56 kg/m^{2})
