= Gobosh Aviation =

American homebuilt aircraft manufacturer and marketer

- Company type: Private company
- Industry: Aerospace
- Founded: 2007
- Defunct: 2016
- Fate: Out of business
- Headquarters: Moline, Illinois, United States
- Products: Light-sport aircraft

Gobosh Aviation was an American aircraft manufacturer based in Moline, Illinois. The company specialized in light-sport aircraft for the American domestic market. The company's first product was the Gobosh 700S, introduced in 2007. This was joined by the Gobosh 800XP in 2008.

The company name means "Go Big Or Stay Home".

By 2016 the company website had been taken down and the company had likely gone out of business.

== Aircraft ==
Summary of aircraft built by Gobosh Aviation
Model name	First flight	Number built	Type
Gobosh 700S	2007		All-metal, single engined, low-wing light aircraft
Gobosh 800XP	2008		All-composite, single engined, low-wing light aircraft
