= Gobosh 700S =

American homebuilt aircraft

700S

General information
- Type: Light-sport aircraft
- National origin: United States
- Manufacturer: Gobosh Aviation
- Designer: Tomasz Antoniewski
- Status: Production completed

History
- Introduction date: 2007
- Developed from: Aero AT-3

The Gobosh 700S is an American light-sport aircraft that was designed by Polish designer Tomasz Antoniewski as the Aero AT-3 and was marketed by Gobosh Aviation of Moline, Illinois. The 700S was introduced in 2007 and when it was available was supplied as a complete ready-to-fly-aircraft.

By 2016 the company website had been taken down and the company had likely gone out of business.

== Design and development ==
The aircraft was designed to comply with the US light-sport aircraft rules. It features a cantilever low-wing, a two-seats-in-side-by-side configuration enclosed open cockpit under a bubble canopy, fixed tricycle landing gear and a single engine in tractor configuration.

The aircraft is made from aluminum sheet and its 27.3 ft (8.3 m) span wing mounts winglets. The standard engine available is the 100 hp (75 kW) Rotax 912ULS four-stroke powerplant.

== Specifications (700S) ==
Data from Bayerl and Gobosh

General characteristics

- Crew: one
- Capacity: one passenger
- Length: 20 ft 6 in (6.25 m)
- Wingspan: 27 ft 4 in (8.33 m)
- Height: 7 ft 4 in (2.24 m)
- Empty weight: 820 lb (372 kg)
- Gross weight: 1,320 lb (599 kg)
- Fuel capacity: 18.5 U.S. gallons (70 L; 15.4 imp gal)
- Powerplant: 1 × Rotax 912ULS four cylinder, liquid and air-cooled, four stroke aircraft engine, 100 hp (75 kW)
- Propellers: 2-bladed, 5 ft 8 in (1.73 m) diameter

Performance

- Cruise speed: 116 kn (133 mph, 215 km/h)
- Stall speed: 39 kn (45 mph, 72 km/h)
- Never exceed speed: 129 kn (148 mph, 239 km/h)
- Range: 360 nmi (410 mi, 670 km)
- Service ceiling: 13,200 ft (4,000 m)
- Rate of climb: 850 ft/min (4.3 m/s)
