= List of military aircraft of the Soviet Union and the CIS =

This list of the military aircraft of the Soviet Union and the Commonwealth of Independent States (CIS) includes experimental, prototypes, and operational types regardless of era. It also includes both native Soviet designs, Soviet-produced copies of foreign designs, and foreign-produced aircraft that served in the military of the Union of Soviet Socialist Republics (USSR) and its successor states of the CIS. The service time frame begins with the year the aircraft entered military service (not the date of first flight, as reported by some sources). Stated production quantities, which are often very approximate, include all variants of the aircraft type produced for the USSR, unless otherwise noted.

Wikipedia convention is to use the Soviet or Russian names and designations for these aircraft, not the post-World War II NATO reporting names, although these will be used as redirects to guide the reader to the desired article. The reporting names assigned by Western intelligence agencies listed here are provided for ease of reference; they are by no means complete.

== Fighters ==
Type	No. built	Service period	NATO name	Remarks
Alekseyev I-21/211/215	3	–	n/a	
Bell P-39 Airacobra	4,719	1943–1949	n/a	Lend-Lease from the United States
Bell P-63 Kingcobra	2,397	1944–1950	Fred	Lend-Lease from the United States
Curtiss P-40 Tomahawk/Kittyhawk	2,425	1941–1945	n/a	Lend-Lease from the United States
Grigorovich I-1	1	–	n/a	
Grigorovich I-2 & I-2bis	211	1924–?	n/a	
Grigorovich DI-3	1	–	n/a	
Grigorovich I-Z	73	1933–1936	n/a	
Grigorovich IP-1	91 ca.	1936–1940	n/a	
Heinkel I-7	134	1931–?	n/a	
Ilyushin I-21	2	–	n/a	
Kochyerigin DI-6	222	1934–?	n/a	Two seater
Lavochkin-Gorbunov-Goudkov LaGG-1	100~	1940–1945?	n/a	
Lavochkin-Gorbunov-Goudkov LaGG-3	6,528	1940?–1945	n/a	
Lavochkin La-5	9,920	1942–1940s?	n/a	Includes trainers.
Lavochkin La-7	5,753	1944–?	Fin	Includes trainers.
Lavochkin La-9	1,559–1,895	1946–?	Fritz	Includes trainers.
Lavochkin La-11	1,182	1948–?	Fang	
Lavochkin La-15	235	1949–1954	Fantail	
Mikoyan-Gurevich MiG-1	100	1940–?	n/a	
Mikoyan-Gurevich MiG-3	3,120	1941–1945	n/a	Includes propeller-driven MiG-9.
Mikoyan-Gurevich MiG-9 (jet)	550	1946–?	Fargo	Includes trainers.
Mikoyan-Gurevich MiG-13/I-250	10-20	-	n/a	
Mikoyan-Gurevich MiG-15	12,000~	1949–?	Fagot	Includes trainers.
Mikoyan-Gurevich MiG-17	10,000	1952–1970s	Fresco	
Mikoyan-Gurevich MiG-19	8,500~	1955–?	Farmer	First Soviet supersonic fighter. Includes foreign production.
Mikoyan-Gurevich MiG-21	10,000+	1959	Fishbed	Includes foreign production and trainers
Mikoyan-Gurevich MiG-23	5,000~	1970	Flogger	
Mikoyan-Gurevich I-75	1	–	?	Prototype interceptor lost to Su-9.
Mikoyan-Gurevich MiG-25P	1,190	1972-2007	Foxbat	Includes trainers.
Mikoyan MiG-27	1,070	1982	Flogger-D/J	
Mikoyan MiG-29	1,600+	1983	Fulcrum	Includes trainers.
Mikoyan MiG-31	500~	1982	Foxhound	
Mikoyan MiG-33	unknown	–	Fulcrum-E	MiG-29M marketing designation.
Mikoyan MiG-35	6	–	Fulcrum-F	Prototype for export.
Mikoyan LMFS 1.27	–	–	?	Light Multi-function Frontal Aircraft.
Mikoyan-Gurevich Ye-152A	1	1960–1965	Flipper	Final MiG-21 experimental model.
Polikarpov I-1	35	-	n/a	Not used
Polikarpov I-3	389	1929–1935	n/a	
Polikarpov I-5	803	1931–1942	n/a	
Polikarpov I-6	2	-	n/a	Prototype for I-5
Polikarpov I-15 "Chaika"	7,175+	1935–1944	n/a	
Polikarpov I-16 "Ishak"	9,004+	1935–1940s	n/a	Possibly 7364 fighters and 1895 trainers built.
Polikarpov I-17	3	–	n/a	Prototypes only
Sukhoi Su-1/I-330	1	1940	n/a	High-altitude fighter prototype.
Sukhoi Su-1/I-360	1	1941	n/a	Su-1 with revised wing, did not fly.
Sukhoi Su-5/I-107	1	1945	n/a	Mixed-power propeller/motorjet prototype.
Sukhoi Su-7 (1944)	1	1944–1945	n/a	Mixed-power interceptor developed from attack Su-6.
Sukhoi Su-7	200<	1956–?	Fitter-A	Swept-wing 'Fitter' model.
Sukhoi Su-9	1,100<	1959-1970	Fishpot-A/B	
Sukhoi Su-11	108	1964–1983	Fishpot-C	Improved Su-9, some modified from Su-9.
Sukhoi Su-15	1,500<	1967–1992	Flagon	Include trainers. Su-15TM not redesignated Su-21.
Sukhoi Su-27	680~	1984	Flanker	Includes exports and trainers
Sukhoi Su-30	630+	1992	Flanker-C/G/H	Interceptor, was Su-27PU.
Sukhoi Su-33	35~	1994	Flanker-D	Includes trainer; carrier fighter, was Su-27K.
Sukhoi Su-35	151	1997	Flanker-E	Was Su-27M.
Sukhoi Su-37	2	–	Flanker-F	Cancelled Su-35 development.
Sukhoi Su-47	–	–	Firkin	Technology demonstrator
Sukhoi Su-57	35	2020	Felon	25 Su-57 Felon Serial + 10 Prototypes
Tupolev I-4	369	1928–1933	n/a	
Tupolev Tu-28/Tu-128	198	1965–1992	Fiddler-A/B	
Yakovlev Yak-1	8,720~	1940–1945	n/a	Includes trainers.
Yakovlev Yak-3	4,848	1944–1945	n/a	Includes trainers.
Yakovlev Yak-7	6,339	1942–?	Mark	Includes trainers.
Yakovlev Yak-9	16,769	1942–?	Frank	Includes trainers.
Yakovlev Yak-15	280~	1947–?	Feather	
Yakovlev Yak-17	430	1948–?	Feather	Includes trainers.
Yakovlev Yak-23	310	1949–1950s	Flora	Replaced by MiG-15.
Yakovlev Yak-25	480	1955–1967	Flashlight	
Yakovlev Yak-28P	1,700~	1967–1980s	Firebar	
Yakovlev Yak-38	231	1976–1991	Forger	VTOL carrier fighter
Supermarine Spitfire Vb	143	1943	n/a	British War-Aid
Supermarine Spitfire IX	1200	1943-1947	n/a	British War-Aid
Hawker Hurricane IIA	196	1941-?	n/a	British War-Aid
Hawker Hurricane IIB	1606	1941-?	n/a	British War-Aid
Hawker Hurricane IIC	1136	1941-?	n/a	British War-Aid
Hawker Hurricane IID	46	1942-?	n/a	British War-Aid
Hawker Hurricane IV	30	1943-?	n/a	British War-Aid

== Attack ==
Type	No.	Service period	NATO name	Remarks
Ilyushin Il-2 "Sturmovik"	29,937	1941–1950s	Bark	Excludes Il-10.
Ilyushin Il-10	5,026	1944–1956	Beast	Excludes Czech production; includes trainers.
Ilyushin Il-40	2	1953	Brawny	Prototypes only.
Kochyerigin LBSh	2	1939	n/a	Prototypes only. Cancelled in favor of Il-2
Mikoyan-Gurevich MiG-23	5,047	1970–1998	Flogger	Includes 3,630 fighters and trainers, but excludes MiG-27s.
Mikoyan-Gurevich MiG-25BM	~100	1982–?	Foxbat-F	SEAD variant.
Mikoyan MiG-27	925	1975	Flogger-D/J	Excludes Indian production. Ground-attack MiG-23.
Sukhoi Su-2	> 500	1940–1942	n/a	Later used as squadron hacks.
Sukhoi Su-7B	1,700–1,800	1961–1986	Fitter-A	Includes trainers and ~600 exports.
Sukhoi Su-17 "Strizh"	2,867	1971	Fitter	Includes 500+ for export and trainers.
Sukhoi Su-24 "Chemodan"	1,400	1974	Fencer	700+ for the USSR, includes 110+ reconnaissance variants.
Sukhoi Su-25 "Grach"	>580	1981	Frogfoot	Includes trainers; ~80 being upgraded to Su-25SM.
Sukhoi Su-25T/Su-25TM/Su-39	20	1996	Frogfoot	20 Su-25T built; 8 upgraded to Su-39TM.
Sukhoi Su-30M	500+	1990s	Flanker-F (Variant 2)	Multirole Su-27; 4+ built.
Sukhoi Su-34/Su-27IB/Su-32FN	74	2014	Fullback	Deliveries ongoing.
Yakovlev Yak-38	231	1976-1994	Forger	Naval VTOL fighter-bomber.

== Bombers ==
Type	No.	Service period	NATO name	Remarks
Archangelski Ar-2	?	1940–1941	n/a	Refined Tupolev SB
Bolkhovitinov DB-A	14	1935–?		
Douglas A-20 Havoc	2,908	1940s	Box	Lend-lease from the United States.
Ilyushin DB-3	1,528	1936–?	n/a	Excludes Il-4.
Ilyushin Il-4	5,256	1941-1950s	Bob	Includes trainers.
Ilyushin Il-28	2,000+	1950–1980s	Beagle	excludes Chinese Hong H-5 version.
Ilyushin Il-54/Il-149	1	–	Blowlamp	Cancelled.
Myasishchev M-4 "Molot"	–	1955-1960s	Bison	93 all variants, few used; most converted to M-4-2 tankers.
M-50/M-52	2	1957	Bounder	Prototypes only.
North American B-25C/D/S/G/J	866	1941	Bank	Lend-lease from the United States.
Petlyakov Pe-2 "Peschka"	11,427	1941-1950s	Buck	Includes trainers.
Petlyakov Pe-8/TB-7	~96	1941–1950s	n/a	93 or 96 built.
Polikarpov R-1 & R-2	2,800+	1924–1934	n/a	Airco DH.9A copy.
Tupolev DB-1	18	1934–1937	n/a	development of ANT-25
Tupolev SB "Katyusha"	6,656	1936–1944	n/a	Includes trainers.
Tupolev TB-1	212	1929–?	n/a	
Tupolev TB-3	818	1930–1942	n/a	Also mothership for parasite I-16s
Tupolev Tu-2	2,527	1943–1950	Bat	
Tupolev Tu-4	847	1949–1960s	Bull	Boeing B-29 Superfortress copy.
Tupolev Tu-12/Tu-77	4	1947–1950	n/a	No production.
Tupolev Tu-14	~100	1949–?	Bosun	Include reconnaissance and torpedo bomber versions; most to the navy.
Tupolev Tu-16	1,507+	1954–1993	Badger	
Tupolev Tu-22 "Shilo"	~250-300	1962	Blinder	Excludes Tu-22M 'Backfire', Includes trainers.
Tupolev Tu-22M	~500	1972	Backfire	
Tupolev Tu-73	1	1947–1948	n/a	Enlarged Tu-72 naval bomber.
Tupolev Tu-80	1	1949	n/a	Improved Tu-4.
Tupolev Tu-82/Tu-22	1	–	Butcher	
Tupolev Tu-85	2	–	Barge	Final Tu-4 refinement.
Tupolev Tu-91	–	–	Boot	1954 prototype naval bomber
Tupolev Tu-95	300+	1956–1997	Bear	Includes trainers.
Tupolev Tu-95MS	–	1984	Bear-H	Tu-142 airframe.
Tupolev Tu-98	2	–	Backfin	1955 Technology demonstrator.
Tupolev Tu-160	16	1987	Blackjack	
Tu PAK DA	–	?	–	No prototypes
Yakovlev Yak-2	111	1940–?	n/a	
Yakovlev Yak-4	90	1941–1945	n/a	Night bomber later used for reconnaissance.
Yakovlev Yak-26	9	?	Flashlight-B	Version of Yak-25 interceptor.
Yakovlev Yak-28	~700	1960–1994	Brewer	
Yermolayev Yer-2	~320	1941–?	n/a	

== Reconnaissance ==
Type	No.	Service period	NATO name	Remarks
Antonov An-30	–	1974	Clank	Aerial survey; few built.
Ilyushin Il-28R	–	?	Beagle	
Mikoyan-Gurevich MiG-21R	–	1965	Fishbed-H	
Mikoyan-Gurevich MiG-25R	–	1970	Foxbat	1190 built all variants.
Myasishchev M-17/M-55 "Geofizika"	6+	1982	Mystic-A/B	Was ELINT, One used for meteorological research.
Neman R-10	490	1937–1943	n/a	
Polikarpov R-1 & R-2	2,800+	1924–1934	n/a	Airco DH.9A copy. Also light bomber.
Polikarpov R-5	490	1928–1944	n/a	
Polikarpov R-Z	1,031	1935–1941?	n/a	Improved R-5.
Sukhoi Su-17R "Strizh"	–	?	Fitter	Some Su-17M used reconnaissance pods. Su-20R was export only.
Sukhoi Su-24MR	110+	1985	Fencer-E	
Tupolev R-3	103	1926–?	n/a	
Tupolev R-6	7,000+	1929–?	n/a	All variants.
Tupolev R-7	1	?	n/a	1930 prototype
Tupolev Tu-16R	1,507+	?	Badger-E	
Tupolev Tu-22R	127	1962–?	Blinder-C	
Yakovlev Yak-4	90	1941–1945	n/a	Reassigned to reconnaissance.
Yakovlev Yak-25RV	165	1959–1974	Mandrake	Two unmanned variants.
Yakovlev Yak-27R	~160-180	1960–?	Mangrove	
Yakovlev Yak-28R	220+	1960s-1990s	Brewer-D	

== Maritime patrol ==
Type	No.	Service period	NATO name	Remarks
Antonov An-72P	–	1987	Coaler	
Beriev Be-2/KOR-1	–	1938–1942	Mote	Cruiser floatplane
Beriev Be-4/KOR-2	–	1941–?	Mug	Flying boat
Beriev Be-6	–	1949–1960s	Madge	Flying boat
Beriev Be-10	–	1956–?	Mallow	Jet flying boat; few produced.
Beriev Be-12 "Chaika"	–	1961	Mail	Amphibious
Beriev Be-42/Be-44 "Albatros"	–	1989	Mermaid	Amphibious
Consolidated PBY/PBN "Catalina"	–	1939-?	Mop	Amphibious
Ilyushin Il-38	~100	1971	May	Some with the Indian Navy.
Myasishchev 3M/3MD "Molot"	93	1956–1980s	Bison-B/C	Converted to tankers.
Tupolev Tu-16PL/R/RM/SP	1,507+	?–1994	Badger-D/E/F	
Tupolev Tu-95MR	12	1970s	Bear-E	
Tupolev Tu-142/Tu-142M	–	1972	Bear-F	

== Airborne early warning and control ==
Type	No.	Service period	NATO name	Remarks
An-71	3	1985–1991	Madcap	Cancelled
Beriev A-50 "Shmel"	~40	1986	Mainstay	Modified IL-76
Ilyushin Il-18D/V	7+	?	Coot-B	5+ Il-18D and 2 Il-18V built.
Ilyushin Il-18D-36 "Bizon"	20+	1970s–?	Coot-B	
Ilyushin Il-22M-11 "Zebra"	21+	1987	Coot-B	
Ilyushin Il-76VKP/Il-82	2	1990s	–	
Ilyushin Il-86VKP/Il-87 Aimak	4+	1990s	Maxdome	
Tupolev Tu-126	8	1968–1980s	Moss	Modified Tu-114 airliner
Tupolev Tu-142MR	10+	1980	Bear-J	

== Electronic warfare ==
Type	No.	Service period	NATO name	Remarks
Antonov An-12B-PP/BK-IS/-PP/-PPS	150+	1964	Cub-A/B/C/D	EW
Antonov An-26M	–	?	Curl	ELINT;
Antonov An-26RM/RTR/RR	42+	1986	Curl-B	SIGINT/COMINT variants.
Ilyushin Il-20RT	–	1978	Coot-A	ELINT variant.
Mikoyan-Gurevich MiG-25RB	–	?	Foxbat	ELINT variants
Sukhoi Su-24MP	12-24	1980s	Fencer-F	ELINT variant.
Tupolev Tu-16Ye/P/SPS and "Elka"	–	?–1994	Badger-A/H/J/K/L	
Tupolev Tu-22P	47	?	Blinder-E	
Tupolev Tu-22MR	20+	1990s	Backfire	Conversions
Tupolev Tu-95RT	45	1960s	Bear-D	
Yakovlev Yak-28PP	120+	1970-1990s	Brewer-E	Escort jammer

== Transport and liaison ==
Type	No.	Service period	NATO name	Remarks
Antonov An-2 "Annushka"	5000+	1947	Colt	Many other operators, excludes Polish production.
Antonov An-8	151	1956–2004	Camp	
Antonov An-10 "Ukraine"	108	1957–1972	Cat	Passenger version of An-12 cargo.
Antonov An-12	1,253	1959	Cub	
Antonov An-14 "Pchelka"	~300	1958–?	Clod	Most for Aeroflot, some to military.
Antonov An-22 "Antei"	66	1967	Cock	
Antonov An-24	~1,465	1963	Coke	
Antonov An-26	1,398	1969	Curl	
Antonov An-28	191	1969	Cash	Built in Poland.
Antonov An-30	123	1968	Clank	Mapping development of An-24/An-26.
Antonov An-32	357	1977	Cline	Re-engined An-26.
Antonov An-72A "Cheburashka"	–	1987	Coaler-C	180+ An-72 and An-74 built; in production
Antonov An-74 "Cheburashka"	–	1990s	Coaler-B	180+ An-72 and An-74 built; in production
Antonov An-124 "Ruslan"	56	1986	Condor	
Antonov An-225 "Mriya"	1	1989–2022	Cossack	Operated commercially from 2001 to 2022. The An-225 was destroyed in the Battle of Antonov Airport during the 2022 Russian invasion of Ukraine.
Ilyushin Il-12	663	1945–?	Coach	Most for Aeroflot, some to military.
Ilyushin Il-14	1,000+	1953–?	Crate	
Ilyushin Il-18	~25	1965–?	Coot	~25 used as VIP transports.
Ilyushin Il-62M	20+	1974	Classic	
Ilyushin Il-76	900+	1978	Candid	
Ilyushin Il-86	103	1977–1994	Camber	
Ilyushin Il-96PU	2	2003	–	Two used by Russian president
Ilyushin Il-112VT	–	–	–	under development
Kharkiv KhAI-5	60+	1940–?	n/a	converted bomber
Lisunov Li-2	2,000+	–	Cab	License-built Douglas DC-3.
Polikarpov Po-2	~30,000	1929–?	Mule	Utility biplane
Tupolev PS-9	~70	1933–?	n/a	
Tupolev Tu-104	200	1955–?	Camel	
Tupolev Tu-110	3	1957	Cooker	Used as testbeds.
Tupolev Tu-114 "Rossiya"	31	1957–1975	Cleat	
Tupolev Tu-124	165	1960–?	Cookpot	Some used as trainers (Tu-124Sh-1 and Sh-2).
Tupolev Tu-134BSh/UBL	–	?	Crusty	Tu-22M and Tu-160 crew trainer .
Tupolev Tu-154M	–	?–2006	Careless	Some used as VIP transports.
Tupolev Tu-204/214	68	1995	–	Number includes Tupolev Tu-214.
Yakovlev Yak-6	381	1942–1950	Crib	Light bomber and transport.
Yakovlev Yak-10	40(?)	1945–1947	Crow	Was Yak-14.
Yakovlev Yak-12	3,801	1947–?	Creek	Yak-10 development.
Yakovlev Yak-14	413	1948–?	n/a	Glider
Yakovlev Yak-16	–	1948–?	Cork	Some used for training
Yakovlev Yak-40	–	1968	Codling	A few dozen used by military
Yakovlev Yak-42	–	1980	Clobber	Tu-134 replacement

== Tankers ==
Type	No.	Service period	NATO name	Remarks
Ilyushin Il-76MDK	–	–	–	Planned tanker conversion
Ilyushin Il-78/Il-78M	up to 30	1989	Midas	Converted airliner
Myasishchev 3MS-2/3MN-2 "Molot"	–	?–1990s	Bison	Converted bomber
Myasishchev M-4-2 "Molot"	–	?–1994	Bison	Converted bomber
Tupolev Tu-16D/N/Z	–	?–1996	Badger-A	

== Trainers ==
Type	No.	Service period	NATO name	Remarks
Aero L-29 "Delphin"	2,000+	1963	Maya	Czechoslovak jet
Aero L-39 "Albatros"	–	1972	n/a	Czechoslovak jet
Avro 504 (U-1)	700+	1918–?	n/a	
Ilyushin Il-28U	–	?–1980s	Mascot	
Mikoyan-Gurevich MiG-15UTI	–	?–1970s	Midget	
Mikoyan-Gurevich MiG-21U	–	1962	Mongol	
Polikarpov U-2	~30,000	1929–?	Mule	Also used by other operators
North American AT-6	82	?	–	Lend-Lease from the United States
Sukhoi Su-7U	–	?–1980s	Moujik	
Sukhoi Su-9U	~50	1962–1970s	Maiden	
Sukhoi Su-11U	–	?–1983	Maiden	
Yakovlev UT-1	1,241	1936–?	n/a	
Yakovlev UT-2	7,243	1937–1950s	Mink	Main World War II basic trainer.
Yakovlev Yak-7U	6,399	?	Mark	
Yakovlev Yak-11	4,566	1946–1962	Moose	
Yakovlev Yak-17UTI	~430	?	Magnet	
Yakovlev Yak-18	9,000+	1946	Max	
Yakovlev Yak-28U	–	?–1994	Maestro	
Yakovlev Yak-30	4	–	Magnum	lost to L-29 Delfin.
Yakovlev Yak-52	~1,800	1976	n/a	

== Helicopters ==
Type	No.	Service period	NATO name	Remarks
Kamov Ka-15/Ka-18	–	–	Hen	
Kamov Ka-20	–	–	Harp	
Kamov Ka-22 "Vintokryl"	–	–	Hoop	
Kamov Ka-25	140	1960s	Hormone	For the Soviet Navy
Kamov Ka-26	816+	1970	Hoodlum-A	number includes military and civilian examples.
Kamov Ka-226 "Sergei"	~10	–	Hoodlum-C	~10 on order for the Russian Navy.
Kamov Ka-27/Ka-29	267	1982	Helix	All variants, 59 Ka-29 troop transports.
Kamov Ka-31	–	2003?	Helix 'B'	Naval AEW Platform
Kamov Ka-32	170+	2006	Helix 'C'	umber includes military and civilian examples.
Kamov Ka-50 "Chernaya Akula"	8	1995	Hokum-A	Prototypes
Kamov Ka-52	100	2012	Hokum-B	
Mil Mi-1	< 1,800	1951–?	Hare	Production transferred to Poland. Military and civilian use
PZL Mi-2	5,250+	1965	Hoplite	built in Poland for military and civilian use.
Mil Mi-4	< 3,500	1953–?	Hound	Produced for military and civil use and exported.
Mil Mi-6/Mi-22	~860	1960	Hook	Produced for military and civil use and exported.
Mil Mi-8	17,000+	1967	Hip	All variants including Mi-17 (see below) and exports.
Mil Mi-9/Mi-19	–	1977	Hip-G/?	Mi-8/Mi-17 Airborne command post
Mil Mi-10	55+	1963	Harke	In civilian use by NPO-Vzylot
Mil Mi-14	~75-100	1975	Haze	
Mil Mi-17/Mi-8M	?	1977	Hip-H	
Mil Mi-24 "Krokodil"	5,200+	1973	Hind	includes exports, Mi-24V redesignated as Mi-35
Mil Mi-26	~300	1982	Halo	
Mil Mi-28 "'Ночной охотник'"	24	2009	Havoc	more planned
Yakovlev Yak-24	~100	1952–?	Horse	

== Experimental ==
Type	No.	Service period	NATO name	Remarks
Antonov An-74AEW/An-71	1	–	Madcap	Prototype AEW variant.
Beriev A-60	2	–	–	Laser-armed Il-76MD.
Bisnovat 5	2	–	–	Rocket research aircraft.
Mikoyan-Gurevich I-270	2	–	n/a	1945 rocket interceptor, cancelled.
Mikoyan Project 1.44	1	–	Flatpack	Technology demonstrator.
Mil V-12	2	–	Homer	Prototype helicopter.
Myasishchev M-50/M-52	2	–	Bounder	Cancelled intercontinental bomber.
OKB-1 EF 140	1	–	–	Junkers jet bomber development.
Sukhoi Su-47/S-37 "Berkut"	1	–	Firkin	Forward-swept wing demonstrator.
Sukhoi T-4	1	–	–	Reconnaissance/strike/interceptor, cancelled.
Tupolev I-12	1	–	–	1931 fighter armed with recoilless 76 mm cannons.
Yakovlev Yak-36	4	–	Freehand	1960s experimental VTOL aircraft; only 2 flown.
Yakovlev Yak-141	4	–	Freestyle	VTOL fighter; only 2 flown; cancelled.
Sukhoi Su-9 (1946)	2	–	–	Soviet attempt to make an early fighter jet.

== See also ==
- USSR military aircraft designation systems
- List of aircraft
- List of Russian aerospace engineers
- List of currently active Russian military aircraft
