= Polikarpov I-6 =

Soviet Polikarpov biplane fighter

I-6

General information
- Type: Fighter
- National origin: Soviet Union
- Manufacturer: Polikarpov
- Designer: Nikolai Polikarpov
- Status: prototype
- Number built: 2

History
- First flight: 30 March 1930

The Polikarpov I-6 was a Soviet biplane fighter prototype of the late 1920s. It was designed with traditional wooden construction in comparison with the wood and steel tube construction Polikarpov I-5. Its development took longer than planned and the lead designer, Nikolai Polikarpov, was arrested for industrial sabotage, which only further delayed the project. Only two prototypes were built, as the I-5 was selected for production.

== Design and development ==
Development of the I-6 (Istrebitel'—fighter) began in September 1928 with a deadline for delivery for the first prototype of 1 August 1929 after the first prototypes of the Polikarpov I-3 were completed. Although the new fighter shared many of the characteristics of the earlier design, including the staggered sesquiplane, single-bay, layout of the wings, it was a new design which used a nine-cylinder, single-row, air-cooled Bristol Jupiter radial engine rather the water-cooled inline engine of its predecessor. It was designed by the OSS (Russian: Otdel Sookhoputnykh Samolyotov—Landplane Department), later redesignated as OPO-1 (Russian: Opytnyy Otdel—Experimental Department) of Aviatrest ("Aviation Trust") under the supervision of Nikolai Polikarpov, head designer of the department. It was originally intended to be compared to the I-3, but this was changed to an evaluation of construction methods with the wooden construction I-6 compared to the mixed construction Polikarpov I-5. Both aircraft used the Jupiter VI engine for which a license had recently been negotiated.

The I-6 had an oval-section semi-monocoque fuselage covered with 'shpon', molded birch plywood, with a small headrest faired into the fuselage, although the engine was enclosed in a metal cowling that left the cylinder heads exposed for better cooling. The two-spar wings were covered in plywood and fabric and had a Clark Y profile. Internal bracing wires were fitted to reinforce the wings. The control surfaces were framed in duralumin, but covered in fabric. The duralumin N-type struts that separated the wings, and attached the upper wing to the fuselage, had a teardrop profile. They were reinforced with steel bracing wires. The conventional undercarriage was fixed with rubber shock absorbers. The wooden propeller was given a spinner. The lighter weight of the air-cooled Jupiter engine, which required neither a heavy radiator nor coolant, meant that the I-6 had an empty weight only 62% of that of the I-3.

Polikarpov was arrested and imprisoned by the OGPU in September 1929 for the crime of industrial sabotage when neither the I-6 nor the I-5 projects met their stipulated deadlines, and this delayed the first flight of the I-6 until 30 March 1930. The second prototype was completed shortly thereafter and both aircraft appeared in that year's May Day fly-past over Moscow. Both aircraft likely used imported engines before they were replaced by the Soviet-built copy of the Jupiter, the Shvetsov M-22. One I-6 crashed on 13 June 1930 after the test pilot bailed out, without justification, in the opinion of the Soviet aviation historian Vadim B. Shavrov.

The I-5 and the I-6 were virtually identical in performance, although the I-6 took 15 seconds to complete a full circle versus the 9.5 seconds of the I-5. Both aircraft were armed with two 7.62 mm (0.3 in) PV-1 machine guns, but the production model of the I-5 was expected to be armed with four, although this proved to impose too great a penalty to the I-5's performance. The exact reasons for the selection of the I-5 over the I-6, which was debated for a full year, are not known, but likely relate to both of these factors. Polikarpov was not informed of the selection of the I-5 until his release in 1933 after his initial sentence of death had been commuted to ten years of imprisonment in a labor camp.

== Specifications ==
Data from Istoriia konstruktskii samoletov v SSSR do 1938 g.

General characteristics

- Crew: 1
- Length: 6.8 m (22 ft 4 in)
- Wingspan: 10 m (32 ft 10 in)
- Wing area: 20.5 m^{2} (221 sq ft)
- Empty weight: 868 kg (1,914 lb)
- Gross weight: 1,280 kg (2,822 lb)
- Powerplant: 1 × Shvetsov M-22 9-cylinder air-cooled radial piston engine, 313 kW (420 hp)
- Propellers: 2-bladed fixed-pitch propeller

Performance

- Maximum speed: 280 km/h (170 mph, 150 kn)
- Range: 700 km (430 mi, 380 nmi)
- Service ceiling: 7,500 m (24,600 ft)
- Time to altitude: 5,000 m (16,000 ft) in 10 minutes
- Wing loading: 62 kg/m^{2} (13 lb/sq ft)
- Power/mass: 0.245 kW/kg (0.149 hp/lb)
- Horizontal turn time: 15 sec

Armament

- Guns: 2 × 7.62 mm (0.30 in) PV-1 machine guns

== See also ==
Related development

- Polikarpov I-5

Aircraft of comparable role, configuration, and era

- Heinkel HD 37
- Curtiss P-6 Hawk
- Bristol Bulldog

== Bibliography ==
- Gordon, Yefim; Dexter, Keith (2002). Poliarpov's Biplane Fighters. Red Star. Vol. 6. Hinckley, England: Midland Publishing. ISBN 1-85780-141-5.
- Green, William; Gordon Swanborough. The Complete Book of Fighters. Godalming, UK: Salamander Books. p. 415.
- Gunston, Bill (1995). The Osprey Encyclopedia of Russian Aircraft 1875-1995. London: Osprey. ISBN 1-85532-405-9.
