= I6 =

I6 or I-6 may refer to:

- Japanese submarine I-6, an Imperial Japanese Navy submarine launched in 1935 and sunk in 1944
- Polikarpov I-6, a Soviet fighter prototype of the 1930s
- Straight-six engine, six-cylinder internal combustion engine
- Ravenloft (module), or "I6: Ravenloft," a 1983 adventure module for Dungeons & Dragons
- Roewe i6, a Chinese saloon

I 6 is a Swedish regimental designation (6th Infantry Regiment) that has been used by the following units:

- Västgöta Regiment (1816–1927)
- North Scanian Infantry Regiment (1928–1963)

== See also ==
- 6I (disambiguation)
