= Polikarpov DI-1 =

Soviet aircraft

DI-1 (2I-N1)

General information
- Type: Fighter
- National origin: Soviet Union
- Manufacturer: Polikarpov
- Designer: Nikolai Nikolaevich Polikarpov
- Status: Cancelled
- Number built: 1

History
- First flight: 12 January 1926

The Polikarpov DI-1 (DI - Dvukhmesnyy Istrebitel - two-seat fighter), also known as 2I-N1, Russian: Поликарпов ДИ-1 (2И-Н1), was a prototype Soviet two-seat fighter designed during the 1920s. The sole prototype built crashed on its ninth flight, due to manufacturing defects, and the program was cancelled.

== Design and development ==
Nikolai Nikolaevich Polikarpov began design of a two-seat fighter initially designated as the 2I-N1 (two-seat Istrebitel' (fighter) with a single Napier engine) in October 1924 at Zavod (Factory) Nr. 1 at Khodynka Aerodrome, Moscow. It was the first Soviet indigenous two-seat fighter. It was a single-bay biplane with its wings arranged in a sesquiplane configuration. The oval-shaped, semi-monocoque fuselage was made of 'shpon', molded birch plywood. The wings were also covered with 'shpon'. The upper wing had two spars, but the lower wing only had one. Internal bracing wires were not used in the wings as it was built up from plywood ribs with large lightening holes and stringers. V-struts made from Duralumin separated the wings and connected the upper wing to the fuselage. Steel bracing wires were used externally. An airfoil enclosed the axle of the fixed undercarriage and a small ski served as a tailskid. It had an imported 336-kilowatt (451 hp) Napier Lion engine enclosed in a metal cowling. It carried 547 kg (1,206 lb) of fuel and oil. The armament consisted of a single fixed 7.62 mm (0.300 in) synchronized PV-1 machine gun and a 7.62 mm DA machine gun mounted on a ring in the observer's cockpit.

The first flight of the prototype took place on 12 January 1926 and the DI-1, as it was now known, demonstrated excellent performance. Polikarpov himself flew as the observer on the fourth and eighth test flights. However, during the ninth flight on 31 March 1926, the aircraft was making speed runs over the measured kilometer at Khodynka Airfield at a height of 100 metres (328 ft) when the upper surface of the right upper wing ripped off, followed by the lower skin. Both right wings then collapsed and the DI-1 crashed, killing both the pilot, V. N. Filippov, and the observer, V. V. Mikhailov.

Examination of the wreckage revealed that large portions of the wings' skin were badly glued and that a number of rib caps and stringers were not glued at all. Many panel pins were not connected to the structure at all and many of the bradawl holes necessary to equalize pressure between the inside of the wing and the outside were missing entirely. The crash of such an advanced aircraft shocked the entire industry and caused a six-month hiatus in design work. Polikarpov overreacted to its loss and built the structure of a number of his subsequent aircraft stronger, and thus, heavier, than it needed to be. All further work on the project was abandoned following the crash, nominally for lack of a suitable engine.

== Specifications ==
Data from Istoriia konstruktskii samoletov v SSSR do 1938

General characteristics

- Crew: 2
- Length: 9.75 m (32 ft 0 in)
- Wingspan: 12 m (39 ft 4 in)
- Wing area: 27.15 m^{2} (292.2 sq ft)
- Empty weight: 1,153 kg (2,542 lb)
- Gross weight: 1,700 kg (3,748 lb)
- Powerplant: 1 × Napier Lion W-12 water-cooled piston engine, 336 kW (451 hp)
- Propellers: 2-bladed fixed-pitch propeller

Performance

- Maximum speed: 268 km/h (167 mph, 145 kn)
- Range: 800 km (500 mi, 430 nmi)
- Service ceiling: 7,100 m (23,300 ft)
- Time to altitude: 5,000 m (16,000 ft) in 13 minutes
- Wing loading: 63 kg/m^{2} (13 lb/sq ft)
- Power/mass: 0.2 kW/kg (0.12 hp/lb)
- Horizontal turn time: 12 sec

Armament

- Guns: 2 × 7.62 mm (0.30 in) machine guns
