= Heinkel HD 37 =

German biplane fighter aircraft

HD 37, I-7
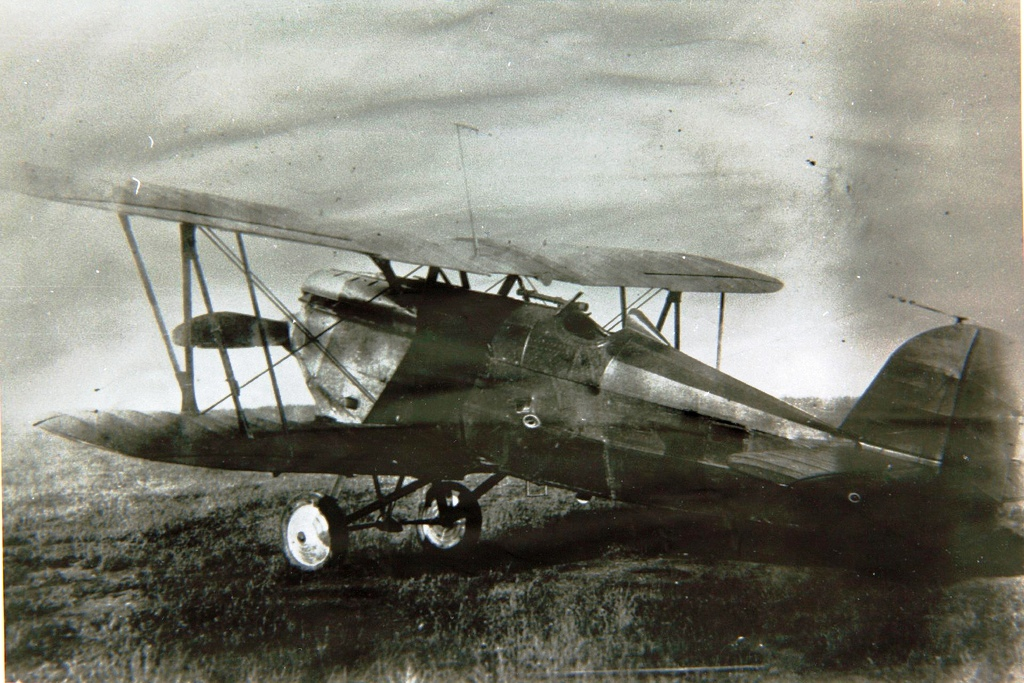
- A VVS Polikarpov I-7

General information
- Type: Fighter
- National origin: Germany
- Manufacturer: Heinkel, TsKB
- Primary user: Soviet Air Force
- Number built: 2x HD37 and 132+ I-7

History
- First flight: 1928

The Heinkel HD 37 was a fighter aircraft, designed in Germany in the late 1920s, but produced in the USSR for Soviet Air Force service. It was a compact, single-bay biplane with staggered wings of unequal span, braced by N-type interplane struts. The pilot sat in an open cockpit, and the main units of the tailskid undercarriage were linked by a cross-axle.

== Design and development ==
It had been designed for the clandestine air force that the Reichswehr was training at Lipetsk, but had been rejected by German officials, who purchased the Fokker D.XIII instead.

The Soviet Air Force was experiencing a crisis with the obsolescence of its main fighter, the Polikarpov I-5, with no replacement apparently forthcoming from domestic manufacturers. When Heinkel was approached to provide an alternative, the firm was able to offer the HD 37, and the two prototypes were flown to Moscow in early 1928. Flight testing produced mixed results. While the basic design was apparently sound, Soviet test pilots reported many deficiencies in handling, and Heinkel was presented with a long list of complex changes to be made. Heinkel responded with the HD 43, and when the same Soviet test pilots found that they liked it even less than the HD 37, attention shifted once again to the previous design by the end of 1929. Early the following year, the Soviet government bought a licence to manufacture the type for the next three years, paying Heinkel 150,000 Marks for it. Manufacturing was carried out by TsKB (Tsentrahl'noye konstrooktorskoye byuro - central construction bureau) and Polikarpov, given the designation I-7.

Many of the improvements that had been adopted in the creation of the HD 43 were eventually implemented in the I-7 as well, along with other modifications, and by the time the first examples flew in summer 1931, flight test results were positive. Despite on-going difficulties in obtaining materials, 131 examples were produced by 1934. Most of these served briefly with units in Belarus, but by the time the last examples were leaving the factory, the type was already obsolete.

== Variants ==
HD 37a
1 built.
HD 37b
1 built.
HD 37c
The third sub-series, produced under licence by Polikarpov after adaptation by TsKB (Tsentrahl'noye konstrooktorskoye byuro - central construction bureau): 132+ built.
Polikarpov I-7
The licence-built HD 37c adapted by TsKB by fitting a Mikulin M-17F engine, PV-1 machine guns and Soviet radio.

== Operators ==
Soviet Union

- Soviet Air Force

== Specifications (I-7) ==
Data from Aircraft of the Soviet Union : the encyclopaedia of Soviet aircraft since 1917

General characteristics

- Crew: 1
- Length: 6.95 m (22 ft 10 in)
- Wingspan: 10.00 m (32 ft 10 in)
- Height: 3.20 m (10 ft 6 in)
- Wing area: 25.9 m^{2} (279 sq ft)
- Empty weight: 1,296 kg (2,857 lb)
- Gross weight: 1,729 kg (3,812 lb)
- Fuel capacity: 200 kg (441 lb) fuel and oil
- Powerplant: 1 × Mikulin M-17F , 540 kW (730 hp)

Performance

- Maximum speed: 290 km/h (180 mph, 160 kn) at sea level
- Landing speed: 96 km/h (60 mph; 52 kn)
- Range: 700 km (430 mi, 380 nmi)
- Service ceiling: 7,200 m (23,600 ft)
- Rate of climb: 9.7 m/s (1,910 ft/min)
- Time to altitude: 1,000 m (3,300 ft) in 2 minutes
- 360° turn: 12 seconds
- Take-off run: 90 m (295 ft) / 7 seconds
- Landing run: 160 m (525 ft) / 13 seconds

Armament

- Guns: 2× fixed, forward-firing 7.62 mm (0.300 in) PV-1 machine guns
