= Polikarpov I-1 =

1923 Soviet monoplane fighter

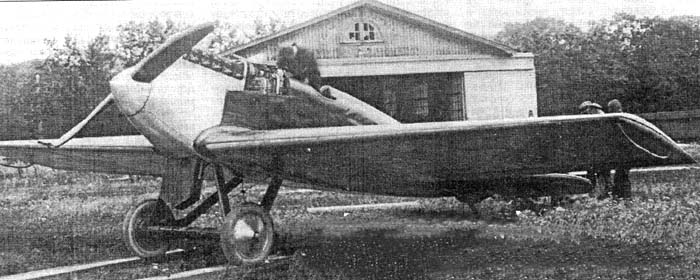
- The IL-400 prototype

General information
- Type: Monoplane fighter
- National origin: USSR
- Manufacturer: Polikarpov
- Designer: Nikolai Nikolaevich Polikarpov
- Number built: 2 prototypes + 33

History
- First flight: 15 August 1923

The Polikarpov I-1 was the first indigenous Soviet monoplane fighter. It had to be redesigned after the crash of the first prototype, and was eventually ordered into production in small numbers, but it was never accepted for service with the Soviet Air Forces.

== Development ==
The I-1 (I = Istrebitel or fighter) was a single-seat, low-wing, wooden aircraft. The first prototype, known as the IL-400, was designed around the 400-horsepower (300 kW) Liberty L-12 piston engine. It used the radiator and propeller of the Airco DH.9A. The fuselage and wings were covered with a mix of plywood and fabric. The landing gear was braced by wires and the wingtips were protected by tubular curved skids. On the IL-400's maiden flight on 15 August 1923, the aircraft stalled and crashed because its center of gravity was too far aft.

A second prototype, designated as the IL-400bis or IL-400B, was built, but it had to be redesigned to cure the center of gravity problem. A new, thinner, aluminum wing was designed and the tailplane and vertical stabilizer were enlarged. The cockpit and engine were moved forward and the radiator was replaced by a Lamblin type. It made its first flight on 18 July 1924 and was cleared for production on 15 October as the I-1.

Thirty-three aircraft were ordered, but the first production aircraft was still a prototype. The aluminum skin was replaced by plywood, the radiator was switched for a honeycomb type, and two synchronised 7.62 mm (0.3 in) PV-1 machine guns were fitted. The production aircraft differed from one another and all were used for testing. This showed that the I-1 did not easily recover from a spin and Mikhail Mikhaylovich Gromov was forced to make the first Soviet parachute jump during one such incident on 23 June 1927. The aircraft never entered operational service.

== Operators ==
Soviet Union

- Soviet Air Force

== Specifications ==
Data from Gunston, The Osprey Encyclopedia of Russian Aircraft 1875-1995

General characteristics

- Crew: 1
- Length: 8.3 m (27 ft 3.75 in)
- Wingspan: 10.80 m (35 ft 5.25 in)
- Wing area: 20 m^{2} (215 sq ft)
- Gross weight: 1,510 kg (3,329 lb)
- Powerplant: 1 × Liberty L-12 piston engine , 298 kW (400 hp)

Performance

- Maximum speed: 264 km/h (164 mph, 143 kn)
- Range: 650 km (404 mi, 351 nmi)
- Service ceiling: 6,750 m (22,150 ft)

Armament

- 2 × synchronised 7.62 mm (0.3 in) PV-1 machine guns.

== See also ==
Related lists

- List of military aircraft of the Soviet Union and the CIS
