= Polikarpov R-Z =

Interwar-era Soviet reconnaissance bomber

R-Z
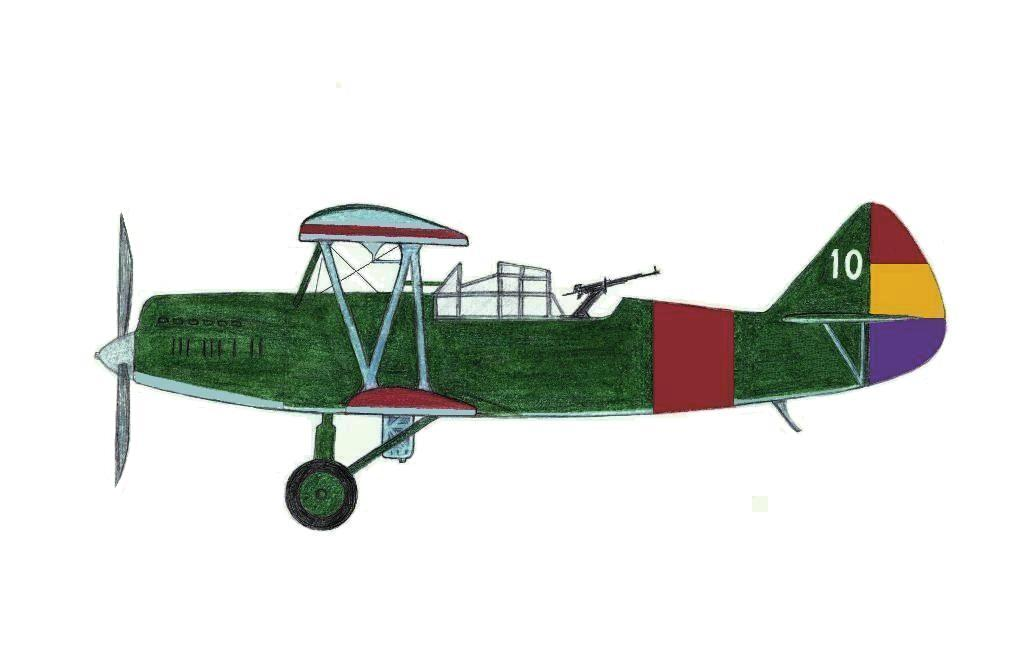
- Polikarpov R-Z "Natacha" of the Spanish Republican Air Force

General information
- Type: Reconnaissance/Light Bomber
- Manufacturer: Polikarpov
- Primary user: Soviet Air Force
- Number built: 1,031

History
- Introduction date: 1935
- First flight: January 1935
- Developed from: Polikarpov R-5

The Polikarpov R-Z was a Soviet reconnaissance bomber aircraft of the 1930s. It was a revised version of the Polikarpov R-5 which was built in large numbers between 1935 and 1937. It was used in combat during the Spanish Civil War as well as the Winter War and Battle of Khalkhin Gol.

== Development and design ==
The R-Z or R-Zet was developed at the aircraft factory GAZ No 1 (State Aircraft Factory No 1) at Moscow as a development of, and a replacement for the Polikarpov R-5, the standard light reconnaissance bomber of the Soviet Air Force. Based on the R-5SSS, the most advanced variant of the R-5, the R-Z had a new, deeper, monocoque fuselage, with a sliding canopy for the pilot and fixed glazed fairing for the observer. The 544 kW (730 hp) M-17F engine (a licensed built copy of the BMW VI) was replaced with the 611 kW (820 hp) M-34 engine. The R-Z first flew in January 1935 and was accepted for the Soviet Air Force in preference to the competing Kochyerigin LR, also an R-5 derivative. By the time production finished in spring 1937, 1,031 R-Zs had been built.

== Operational history ==
Like its predecessor the R-5, the R-Z was used in large numbers by both the Soviet Air Force and Aeroflot.

Its first use in combat was during the Spanish Civil War from 1937. 61 R-Zs were delivered to the Spanish Republican Air Force, where they were nicknamed Natacha. These were heavily used, flying in tight formations and using co-ordinated defensive fire to defend against fighter attack, while returning individually at low levels. Despite these protective measures and the Soviet fighters escort, the R-Zs were easy prey for the FIAT CR.32s, the main fighter of the Nationalists. On 14 July 1937, in the Brunete sector, on the extreme left of the Nationalist Madrid Army Corps, the squadron of Spanish ace Joaquín García Morato intercepted a squadron of R-Zs escorted by a number of Polikarpov I-16s Rata. The Nationalist pilots dived through the fighters escort, and attacked the R-Zs, shooting down five. On 24 December 1938, another group of CR.32s, still led by Morato, while escorting Junkers Ju 52s and Savoia Marchetti SM.79s, spotted a formation of eleven R-Z "Natashas" from the 2ª Escuadrilla, Grupo 30 (which had a total of 60 planes) escorted by Ratas, over Cap de la Serra. The Nationalist pilots dived to attack, and in a few minutes they destroyed nine of the R-Zs.

Although many R-Zs were damaged by ground fire, and the 2ª Escuadrilla, Grupo 30 lost 9 of their 60 aircraft in one day on 24 December 1938, overall losses were relatively low with 36 of the 61 delivered surviving to be captured by the Nationalists at the end of the war in April 1939.

R-Zs were used by the Soviet air force against Japan above Mongolia in the Battle of Khalkhin Gol in 1939, and the Winter War against Finland in the same year. By the time of the German invasion of the Soviet Union in June 1941, the R-Z was in the process of being replaced by the Ilyushin Il-2, although it remained in service with a number of light bomber regiments. The Finns called the aircraft as Hermosaha ("nerve saw") due to the unpleasant sound of its engine.

== Variants ==
R-Z
Main production reconnaissance bomber. Powered by M-34N engine.
R-ZSh
Shturmovik. Single ground attack prototype armed with four ShKAS machine guns in lower wing.
P-Z
Commercial variant with limited changes used for carrying mail and/or two passengers. Produced in considerable numbers. Powered by M-34NB engine.
PT
Attempt at improved civil version with streamlined containers for cargo above lower wing. Unsuccessful, only one built.
R-ZR
Single seat conversion for record breaking purposes. One built. Flown to 11,100 m (36,417 ft) on 8 May 1937

== Operators ==
Spanish Republic

- Spanish Republican Air Force

Spanish State

- Spanish Nationalist Air Force

Soviet Union

- Aeroflot
- Soviet Air Force

(Mongolia) Mongolian People's Republic

- Mongolian People's Army Air Force

== Specifications (R-Z) ==
Data from The Osprey Encyclopedia of Russian Aircraft from 1875 - 1995

General characteristics

- Crew: 2
- Length: 9.72 m (31 ft 11 in)
- Wingspan: 15.45 m (50 ft 8 in)
- Height: 3.6 m (11 ft 10 in)
- Wing area: 42.5 m^{2} (457 sq ft)
- Airfoil: Clark Y (10%)
- Empty weight: 2,007 kg (4,425 lb)
- Gross weight: 3,150 kg (6,945 lb)
- Powerplant: 1 × Mikulin AM-34 V-12 liquid-cooled piston engine, 611 kW (819 hp)
- Propellers: 2-bladed fixed-pitch propeller

Performance

- Maximum speed: 316 km/h (196 mph, 171 kn) at 3,500 m (11,500 ft)
- Range: 1,000 km (620 mi, 540 nmi)
- Service ceiling: 8,700 m (28,500 ft)
- Time to altitude: 3,000 m (9,800 ft) in 6 minutes 36 seconds
- Wing loading: 74.1 kg/m^{2} (15.2 lb/sq ft)
- Power/mass: 0.19 kW/kg (0.12 hp/lb)

Armament

- Guns: 1 × fixed forward firing PV-1 machine gun and 1 or 2 × ShKAS machine guns in rear cockpit
- Bombs: Up to 400 kg (882 lb) bombs

== See also ==
Related development

- Polikarpov R-5

Aircraft of comparable role, configuration, and era

- Hawker Hind
- Fokker C.X

Related lists

- List of Interwar military aircraft
- List of aircraft of the Spanish Republican Air Force

== Bibliography ==
- Donald, David, ed. (1997). The Encyclopedia of World Aircraft. Aerospace Publishing. ISBN 1-85605-375-X.
- Gunston, Bill (1995). The Osprey Encyclopedia of Russian Aircraft from 1875 - 1995. London: Osprey Aerospace. ISBN 1-85532-405-9.
- Jackson, Robert. Fighter! The Story of Air Combat 1936-1945. London, Artur Barker Limited. 1979. ISBN 0-213-16717-4.
