= Polikarpov P-2 =

General information
- Type: Training biplane
- National origin: Soviet Union
- Manufacturer: Polikarpov
- Number built: 55+

History
- First flight: 1927

The Polikarpov P-2 was a 1920s Soviet two-seat intermediate training biplane. It was a single-bay biplane powered by a 300 hp (224 kW) M-6 water-cooled V-8 engine (Hispano-Suiza 8Fb) with a retractable radiator. The prototype first flew in 1927 and entered production with an order for 55 for use as an intermediate trainer. Problems with the original strut-based wing bracing resulted in many aircraft being modified to use bracing wires. It was one of the first aircraft types to be used to train navigators and machine gunners but the type was not very stable and had problems with flying qualities causing the type to be little used.

== Specifications ==
Data from The Illustrated Encyclopedia of Aircraft

General characteristics

- Crew: 2
- Wingspan: 10.40 m (34 ft 1.5 in)
- Powerplant: 1 × M-6 water-cooled V-8 piston engine , 224 kW (300 hp)

Performance

- Maximum speed: 206 km/h (128 mph, 111 kn)

Armament

- ring-mounting on rear-cockpit for a DA machine-gun

Related lists

- List of Interwar military aircraft
