= Polikarpov PM-1 =

1920s Soviet aircraft

General information
- Type: Airliner
- National origin: Soviet Union
- Manufacturer: Polikarpov
- Designer: Aleksander Aleksandrovich Syemyenov
- Number built: 1

History
- First flight: 10 June 1925

The Polikarpov PM-1 was a passenger aircraft created by Polikarpov in the 1920s.

== Design and development ==
The PM-1 (PM - Passazhirskii Maybach – passenger transport Maybach engine) was a wooden biplane with a monocoque fuselage built up from glued ply veneer sheets (known as Sphon), including the integral tail-fin. The two-spar wings were skinned in plywood forward of the main spars and covered in fabric aft of the main-spars. All control surfaces were built in a similar fashion with ply-skinned structural members and built-up wooden structure covered in fabric. Large I-type inter-plane struts, canted at about 30°, and steel cables braced the wings, which were attached to the fuselage at the top and bottom of the main fuselage frames. The undercarriage consisted of 2 main-wheels on a live axle supported by V-stuts with bungee springing. The Maybach Mb.IVa engine was mounted conventionally in the nose and had a retractable radiator forward of the undercarriage.

== Operational history ==
First flown on 10 June 1925 the PM-1 flew a public demonstration flight on 26 July 1925 and started a scheduled Moscow to Berlin service in August 1925. On one of the early flights the aircraft crashed due to engine failure, or engine bearer failure, and was not repaired as the Maybach engine was considered obsolete and the new Kalinin monoplanes promised better performance.

== Specifications ==
Data from Aircraft of the Soviet Union : the encyclopaedia of Soviet aircraft since 1917

General characteristics

- Crew: 1
- Capacity: 5 pax
- Length: 11 m (36 ft 1 in)
- Wingspan: 15.5 m (50 ft 10 in)
- Wing area: 38.5 m^{2} (414 sq ft)
- Empty weight: 1,380 kg (3,042 lb)
- Gross weight: 2,360 kg (5,203 lb)
- Fuel capacity: 440 kg (970 lb) fuel and oil
- Powerplant: 1 × Maybach Mb.IVa 6-cylinder water-cooled in-line piston engine, 190 kW (260 hp)
- Propellers: 2-bladed wooden fixed-pitch propeller

Performance

- Maximum speed: 180 km/h (110 mph, 97 kn)
- Range: 1,200 km (750 mi, 650 nmi)
- Service ceiling: 4,100 m (13,500 ft)
- Time to altitude: 1,000 m (3,300 ft) 8 minutes
- Take-off time: 22 seconds
- Landing time: 15 seconds at 90 km/h (56 mph; 49 kn)
