= 6I =

6I or 6-I can refer to:

- IATA code for Aerosynchro Aviation
- Sixth & I Historic Synagogue
- AH-6I, a variant of the Boeing AH-6
- Pronea 6i, an APS film camera made by Nikon

== See also ==
- I6 (disambiguation)
