= Polikarpov I-3 =

Soviet Polikarpov biplane fighter

I-3/DI-2
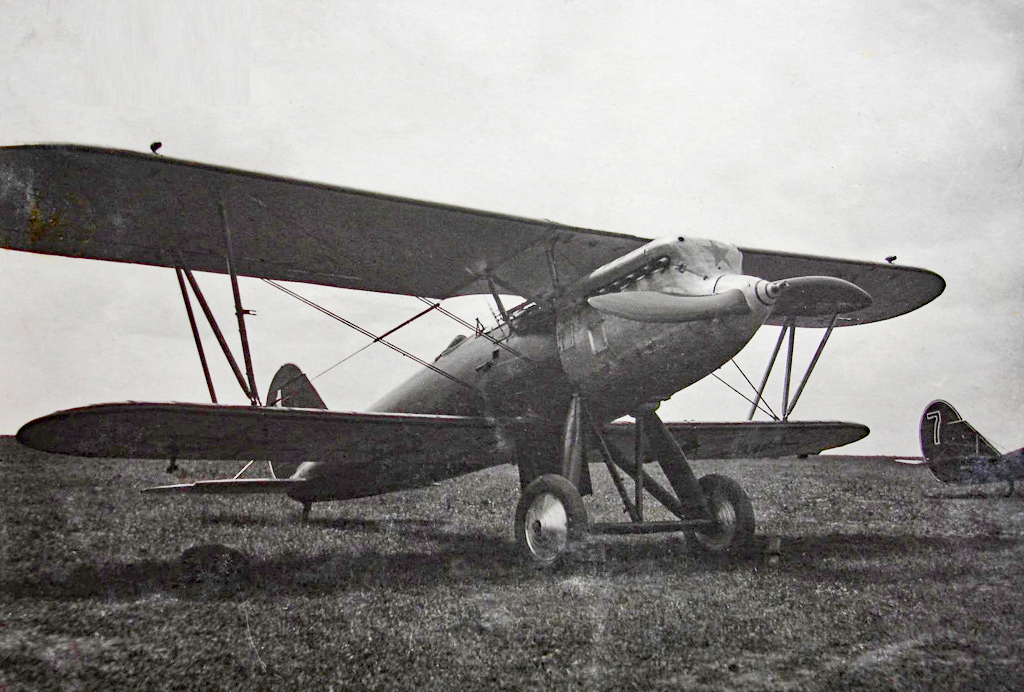
- Polikarpov I-3

General information
- Type: Biplane fighter
- National origin: Soviet Union
- Manufacturer: Polikarpov
- Primary user: VVS
- Number built: 389 or 399

History
- Manufactured: 1928–1931
- Introduction date: 1929
- First flight: 21 February 1928
- Retired: 1935

The Polikarpov I-3 (Russian: Поликарпов И-3) was a Soviet fighter designed during the late 1920s. It entered service in 1929, but was retired in 1935 with the advent of fighters with higher performance.

== Design and development ==
Development of the I-3 began in mid-1926 after investigations into the loss of the Polikarpov DI-1 were completed. Although the new biplane shared many of the characteristics of the earlier design, including the staggered sesquiplane layout of the wings, it was a new design. It was designed by the OSS (Russian: Otdel Sookhoputnykh Samolyotov — Landplane Department) of Aviatrest (Aviation Trust) under the supervision of Nikolai Nikolaevich Polikarpov, head designer of the department. There was much debate within the OSS about the proper powerplant for the new fighter, but Polikarpov rejected the Wright Whirlwind radial engine and decided in favor of the BMW VI liquid-cooled V12 engine. A wooden mock-up was completed in April 1927, but formal approval of the design did not come until 3 June 1927. Static tests of a full-sized model began in October at the same time as negotiations for a license for the BMW engine were finished.

The I-3 had an oval-section semi-monocoque fuselage covered with 'shpon', molded birch plywood, with a small headrest faired into the fuselage, although the engine was enclosed in a metal cowling. The two-spar wings were covered in plywood and fabric and had a Clark Y profile. Internal bracing wires were fitted to reinforce the wings. The control surfaces were framed in duralumin, but covered in fabric. It was provided with differential Frise-type ailerons. The duralumin N-type struts that separated the wings, and attached the upper wing to the fuselage, had a teardrop profile. They were reinforced with steel bracing wires. The conventional undercarriage was fixed with rubber shock absorbers and the tailskid was made from duralumin. The main gear could be replaced by skis like those fitted to the Polikarpov R-1. The engine's semi-retractable radiator extended below the fuselage behind the rear main gear struts. Two fuel tanks were fitted, the main one in the fuselage, but a small 2.5-litre (0.55 imp gal; 0.66 US gal) tank, mainly used to start the engine, was in the center section of the upper wing, along with the engine coolant tank. A total of 210 kg (460 lb) of fuel was carried. Initially the I-3 was fitted with two fixed 7.62 mm (0.300 in) synchronized Vickers machine guns, but these were later replaced by PV-1 machine guns. A central OP-1 optical gunsight was provided with a KP-5 ring sight offset to starboard. Some aircraft had bomb racks to carry two 11.5 kg (25 lb) bombs.

The first prototype was completed in early 1928 and made its first flight on 21 February. Its manufacturer's trials were finished by 10 March and the state acceptance trials by 14 April. The pilots of the NII VVS (Russian: Naoochno-Issledovatel'skiy Institoot Voyenno-Vozdooshnykh Seel – Air Force Scientific Test Institute) criticized the lack of directional stability at high speeds and a slight problem in control response between maneuvers. The area of the vertical tail was increased and the elevators were given horn balances to alleviate the first problem while split ailerons addressed the second problem. Since production had begun before the aircraft was actually approved for service use, the first forty aircraft were completed with the smaller tailplane. A second prototype was completed in August 1928 and tested a different propeller optimized for high speed which increased the top speed to 283 km/h (176 mph), although it lengthened the take-off run. The first 39 aircraft completed, plus the two prototypes, used imported engines, but the remainder used the license-built Mikulin M-17.

Approximately 400 were built, with Gordon and Dexter citing sources that state 389 or 399. They also provide a yearly production table that lists 35 built in 1928, 47 in 1929, 250 in 1930 and 55 in 1931, which add up to 389 when the two prototypes are included.

=== DI-2 ===
The DI-2 (Russian: ДИ-2 Dvukhmesnyy Istrebitel - two-seat fighter) was an enlarged two-seat variant. It had an extra frame added to the fuselage, an extended wingspan and an enlarged rudder. Two 7.62 mm DA machine guns were mounted on a Scarff ring in the observer's cockpit. A prototype was completed in early 1929 and made its first flight in May of that year. However the prototype crashed due to stabilizer failure in a dive later in 1929, killing the pilot.

== Operational use ==
Initial deliveries in 1929 were to units in the Belorussian Military District where they replaced the Grigorovich I-2. They equipped the 4th and 7th Squadrons (Russian: Aviaeskadril'ya–Air Squadron), later the 106th and 107th Fighter Squadrons (Russian: Istrebitel'naya aviaeskadril'ya—Fighter Air Squadrons) at Smolensk; the 13th and 5th Squadrons, later the 108th and 7th Fighter Squadrons, at Bryansk, the 9th Squadron, and the 17th and 19th Squadrons, which later became the 116th and 117th Fighter Squadrons. Units based in Ukraine began to receive theirs the following year. They equipped the 3rd Squadron, later the 109th Fighter Squadron, and the 73rd Air Detachment (Aviaotryad) at Kiev and the 91st Squadron, later the 33rd Fighter Squadron, at Bobruisk. Others were delivered to the 1st, 2nd and 3rd Schools of Military Pilots.

By 1 October 1930 252 I-3s were in service and 282 a year later. 297 were on hand on 1 January 1932, although it fell to 249 a year later and 239 towards the end of 1933. It was relegated to secondary roles in 1935 as newer and more powerful Polikarpov fighters entered service, notably the I-5, I-15, and the I-16.

== Operators ==
Soviet Union

- Soviet Air Force

== Specifications (I-3) ==
Data from Istoriia konstruktskii samoletov v SSSR do 1938 g.

General characteristics

- Crew: 2
- Length: 8.08 m (26 ft 6 in)
- Wingspan: 11 m (36 ft 1 in)
- Wing area: 27.85 m^{2} (299.8 sq ft)
- Airfoil: Clark Y
- Empty weight: 1,400 kg (3,086 lb)
- Gross weight: 1,846 kg (4,070 lb)
- Powerplant: 1 × BMW VI V-12 liquid-cooled piston engine, 545 kW (730 hp)
- Propellers: 2-bladed fixed-pitch propeller

Performance

- Maximum speed: 278 km/h (173 mph, 150 kn)
- Range: 585 km (364 mi, 316 nmi)
- Service ceiling: 7,200 m (23,600 ft)
- Time to altitude: 5,000 m (16,000 ft) 12 minutes 36 seconds
- Wing loading: 66 kg/m^{2} (14 lb/sq ft)
- Power/mass: 0.3 kW/kg (0.18 hp/lb)
- Horizontal turn time: 14 sec

Armament

- Guns: 2 × 7.62 mm (0.3 in) PV-1 machine guns

== See also ==
Related lists

- List of Interwar military aircraft

== Bibliography ==
- Gunston, Bill (1995). The Osprey Encyclopedia of Russian Aircraft 1875-1995. London: Osprey. ISBN 1-85532-405-9.
- Gordon, Yefim; Dexter, Keith (2002). Polikarpov's Biplane Fighters. Hinckley, England: Midland Publishing. ISBN 1-85780-141-5.
