= Polikarpov Ivanov =

Ivanov

General information
- Type: Ground attack monoplane
- National origin: Soviet Union
- Manufacturer: Polikarpov
- Number built: 1

History
- First flight: February 1938

The Polikarpov Ivanov was a 1930s prototype Soviet ground attack monoplane designed by Polikarpov for a soviet government procurement competition codenamed Ivanov.

== Design ==
The Ivanov was an all-metal low-wing monoplane with a retractable conventional landing gear and powered by a 830 hp (619 kW) Shevtsov M-62 radial engine. It was fitted with four wing-mounted ShKAS machine guns with a moveable turret-mounted Berezin UBT fitted at the rear of the cockpit area.

== Development ==
Two prototypes were under construction in 1938 and the first was tested from February to August 1938. The Ivanov was found to need better flying qualities and with the competing Kharkov R-10 already in production the second prototype was not completed and the programme was abandoned.

== Specifications ==
Data from The Osprey Encyclopedia of Russian Aircraft 1875–1995

General characteristics

- Length: 9.4 m (30 ft 10 in)
- Wingspan: 14.0 m (45 ft 11 in)
- Wing area: 28.07 m^{2} (302.1 sq ft)
- Empty weight: 2,662 kg (5,869 lb)
- Max takeoff weight: 3,930 kg (8,664 lb)
- Powerplant: 1 × Shevtsov M-62 radial piston engine, 630 kW (840 hp)
- Propellers: 2-bladed

Performance

- Maximum speed: 425 km/h (264 mph, 229 kn) at 3000 m (9,840 ft)

Armament

- Guns: *4 × fixed synchronised ShKAS machine guns
- 1 × ShKaS and 2 × BK machine guns in wings
- 1 x turret-mounted Berezin UBT machine gun.
- Bombs: 400 kg (880 lb) bombs in bomb bay and 500 kg (1,100 lb) bombs under wings

== See also ==
- Kharkov KhAI-5 winner of the Ivanov competition
- Tupolev ANT-51 a competitor in the Ivanvov competition
