= Polikarpov R-5 =

Soviet recon bomber aircraft (1930–1944)

R-5
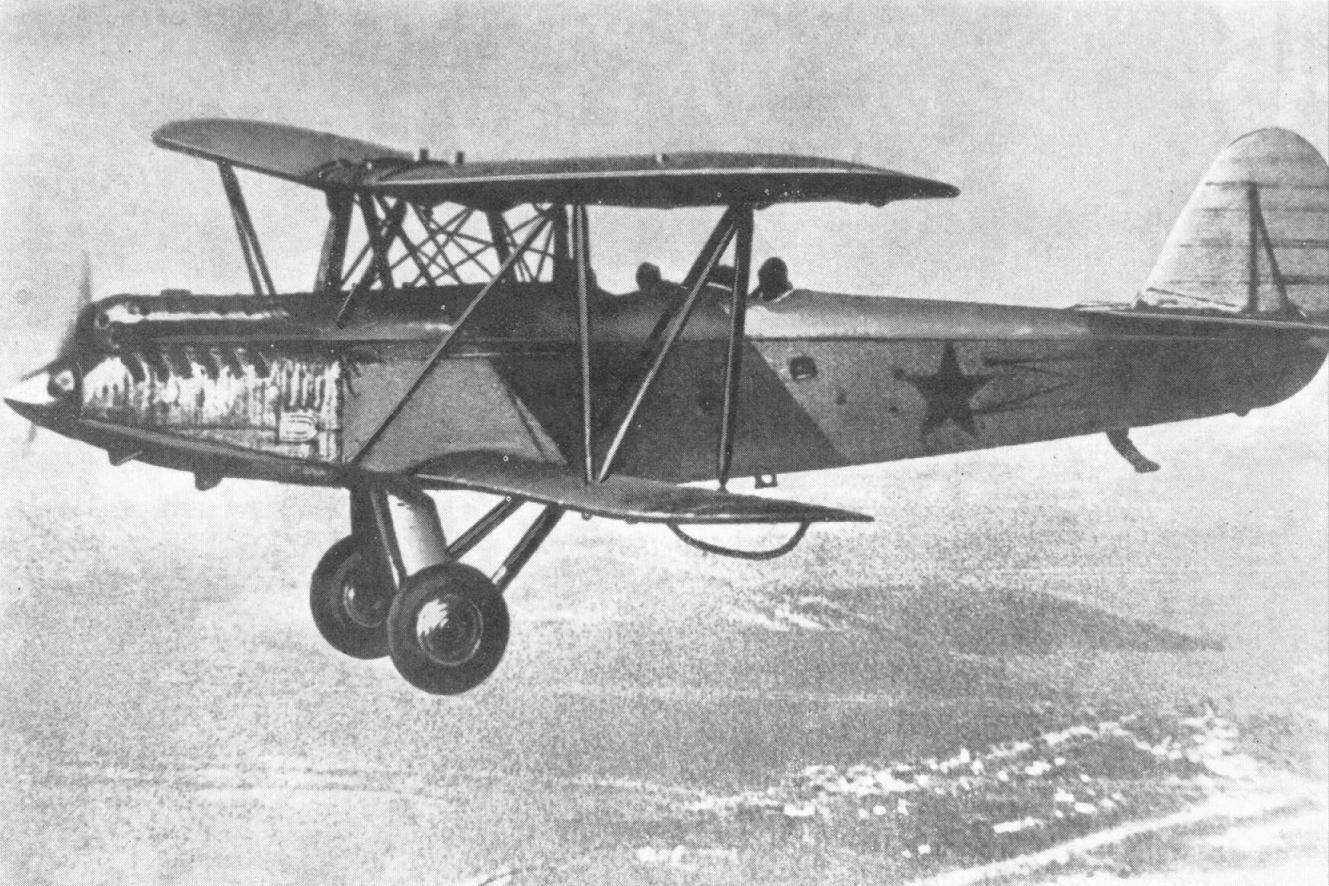

General information
- Type: Reconnaissance/light bomber
- Manufacturer: Polikarpov
- Primary user: Soviet Air Force
- Number built: ~7000

History
- Introduction date: 1930
- First flight: Autumn 1928
- Retired: 1944
- Variant: Polikarpov R-Z

The Polikarpov R-5 (Russian: Р-5) was a Soviet reconnaissance bomber aircraft of the 1930s. It was the standard light bomber and reconnaissance aircraft of the Soviet Air Force for much of the 1930s, while also being used heavily as a civilian light transport, some 7,000 being built in total.

== Development and design ==
The R-5 was developed by the design bureau led by Nikolai Nikolaevich Polikarpov as a replacement for the R-1 (an unlicensed version of the DH.9A built in Russia) which served as the standard reconnaissance and light bomber aircraft with the Soviet Air Force.

The prototype first flew in autumn 1928, powered by an imported German BMW VI V-12 engine. It was an unequal-span single-bay biplane of mainly wooden construction.

After extensive evaluation, the R-5 entered production in 1930, powered by the Mikulin M-17, a licence-built copy of the BMW-VI, as a reconnaissance bomber. Further modified versions were produced to serve as floatplanes, ground-attack aircraft and civil transports.

The R-5SSS, an improved reconnaissance bomber with improved streamlining, served as the basis for the Polikarpov R-Z, which succeeded the R-5 in production.

== Operational history ==
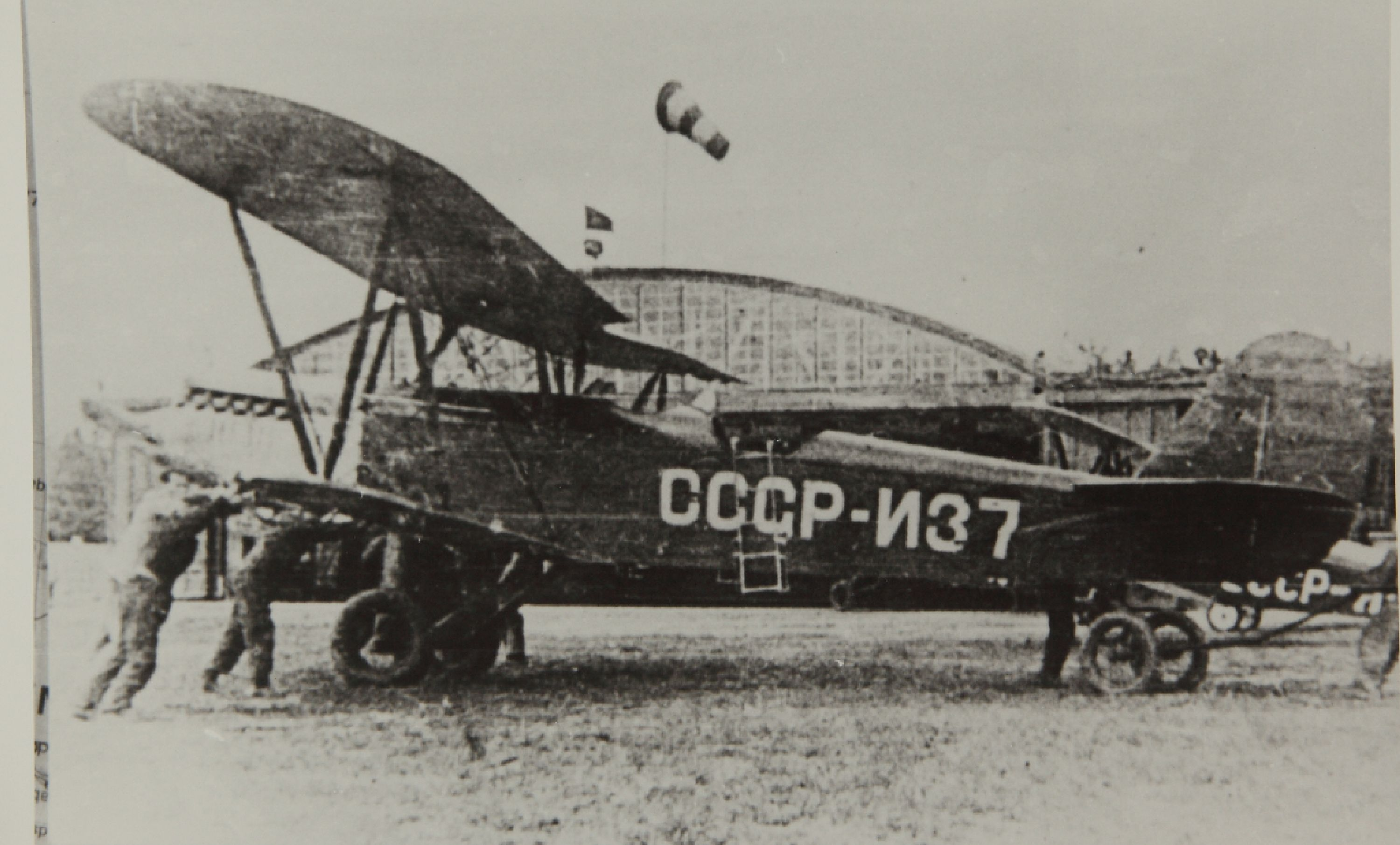
Polikarpov, R-5

The aircraft R-5 was designed by Nikolai Polikarpov in 1928. The aircraft was taken into the Soviet Air Force's use in 1931. They operated 5,000 aircraft R-5. Over 1,000 aircraft simplified for civilian needs were manufactured for Aeroflot under the designation P-5 (Russian: П-5).

The R-5 became the standard reconnaissance and attack aircraft with the Soviet Air Force, being used in large numbers, with over 100 regiments equipped with the R-5. R-5s served with the Soviet Air Force and Mongolian People's Air Force during the 1939 Battle of Khalkhin Gol against the Japanese They took active part in the Soviet invasion of Poland (1939), and in the 1939-40 Winter War against Finland, where they were known as the hermosaha ("nerve saw"). The Finns downed and captured several R-5s, but none were taken into operational service. They remained in service during the war against Germany in 1941-45, where they were mainly used as night bombers and liaison aircraft, serving until 1944.

The Chinese province of Xinjiang received a number of R-5s in 1933, and when a rebellion threatened to overthrow the pro-Moscow governor of Xinjiang, Sheng Shicai, the Soviet Union intervened, with Soviet-flown R-5s bombing rebels near Ürümqi. R-5s remained in use for training purposes in Xinjiang in 1938.

R-5s were also used by the Spanish Republican Air Force in the Spanish Civil War, 31 being sold to Spain. These arrived in November 1936, and were quickly deployed on combat operations. But they were found to be slow and were relegated to night bombing. Seven R-5s remained in good condition in March 1939. The aircraft was known as the "Rasante" (roughly translated as "Low flying") in the Spanish Republican Air Force.

Civil versions of the R-5 were used in large numbers, mainly by Aeroflot. They carried up to 400 kg (882 lb) of freight. Many were fitted with an enlarged rear cockpit to carry two passengers. Other aircraft were fitted with enclosed cabins for passengers. P-5s could also carry underwing containers (or Kasseta) for freight or passengers. One P-5 could carrying 16 adults, including seven in each Kasseta. Ski-equipped P-5s with Kassetas played a key role in the rescue of the crew of the icebound Soviet steamship Chelyuskin in 1934. Civil R-5s remained in service until after the end of the World War II.

== Variants ==
R-5
Main production reconnaissance bomber. Initial production powered by M-17B engine, M-17F from 1933. 4,914 produced.
R-5Sh
Shturmovik ("ground-attack"). Ground attack variant. Additional gun armament consisting of four wing-mounted PV-1 machine guns. These were used in the Battles of Khalkhin Gol.
R-5a
Twin-float, reconnaissance seaplane. Also known as MR-5, MR-5bis or Samolet 10. 111 built 1934-35.
R-5D
Long-range version. One built.
R-5 Jumo
Experimental engine testbed, fitted with an enlarged rear cockpit to accommodate two observers. Also known as the ED-1.
R-5M-34
This experimental version was fitted with a M-34 engine.
R-5T
Single-seat torpedo bomber with divided undercarriage to allow a torpedo or 250-500 kg bomb to be carried under fuselage. Flown in 1934, a series of 50 built by 1935. Two-men crew for reconnaissance tasks.
R5-SSS
Improved version with reduced drag and increased gun armament. Also known simply as SSS. Increased performance. Over 100 built 1935-36.
P-5
Light transport version for Aeroflot.M-17B engine. Approximately 1000 produced by 1940.
P-5a
Twin-float version of P-5 - built in small numbers.
R-5L
Limuzin ("limousine"). Passenger version with cabin for two passengers. Built in small numbers in 1931.
P-5L
Revised passenger transport. Several built in 1933.
Rafaelyants PR-5
Final modernised transport version. New semi-monocoque fuselage with enclosed cabin for four passengers. 210 converted for use by Aeroflot.
Rafaelyants PR-12
Passenger monoplane based on PR-5. One built in 1938.
ARK-5
Arctic exploration version with enclosed, heated cockpit and streamlined containers for payload faired into lower wing and sides of fuselage. Two built.
LSh
Legkii Shturmovik ("light ground attack"). Light armoured attack aircraft - Modified design by Grigorovich. One built 1930.
TSh-1
Tyazheli Shturmovik ("heavy ground attack"). Heavily armoured ground attack aircraft (6 mm armour) based on R-5, again by Grigorovich. Three prototypes.
TSh-2
Refined derivative of Tsh-1 with new lower wings. Ten aircraft built.
ShON
Light attack version with folding wings built for counter insurgency operations against Basmachi rebels in Central Asia. 30 ordered.

== Operators ==
Iran

- Imperial Iranian Air Force

(Spain) Spanish Republic

- Spanish Republican Air Force

Spain

- Spanish Air Force - Post civil war.

Mongolia

- Mongolian People's Army Aviation

Turkey

- Turkish Air Force

Soviet Union

- Aeroflot
- Soviet Air Force

== Specifications (1930 production) ==
Data from The Osprey Encyclopedia of Russian Aircraft from 1875 - 1995

General characteristics

- Crew: 2
- Length: 10.56 m (34 ft 8 in)
- Wingspan: 15.5 m (50 ft 10 in)
- Height: 3.25 m (10 ft 8 in)
- Wing area: 50.2 m^{2} (540 sq ft)
- Airfoil: Clark Y (10%)
- Empty weight: 1,969 kg (4,341 lb)
- Gross weight: 3,247 kg (7,158 lb)
- Powerplant: 1 × Mikulin M-17B V-12 liquid-cooled piston engine, 507 kW (680 hp)
- Propellers: 2-bladed fixed-pitch propeller

Performance

- Maximum speed: 228 km/h (142 mph, 123 kn)
- Range: 800 km (500 mi, 430 nmi)
- Service ceiling: 6,400 m (21,000 ft)
- Time to altitude: 1,000 m (3,300 ft) in 2 minutes 6 seconds
- Wing loading: 64.7 kg/m^{2} (13.3 lb/sq ft)
- Power/mass: 0.16 kW/kg (0.097 hp/lb)

Armament

- Guns: 1 fixed forward firing PV-1 machine gun and 1 DA machine gun in rear cockpit
- Bombs: 250 kg (550 lb) bombs on bomb racks

== See also ==
Related development

- Polikarpov R-Z

Aircraft of comparable role, configuration, and era

- Hawker Hart
- Curtiss Falcon

Related lists

- List of Interwar military aircraft
- List of aircraft of World War II
- List of military aircraft of the Soviet Union
- List of aircraft of the Spanish Republican Air Force

== Bibliography ==
- Andersson, Lennart (2008). A History of Chinese Aviation: Encyclopedia of Aircraft and Aviation in China to 1949. Taipei, Republic of China: AHS of ROC. ISBN 978-957-28533-3-7.
- Andersson, Lennart (July 1998). "Histoire de l'aéronautique persane, 1921–1941: La première aviation du Chah d'Iran" [History of the Persian Air Force, 1921–1941: The First Aircraft of the Shah of Iran]. Avions: Toute l'aéronautique et son histoire (in French) (76): 2–12. ISSN 1243-8650.
- Lawrence, Joseph (1945). The Observer's Book Of Airplanes. London and New York: Frederick Warne & Co.
