= Laville PS-89 =

ZIG-1, PS-89
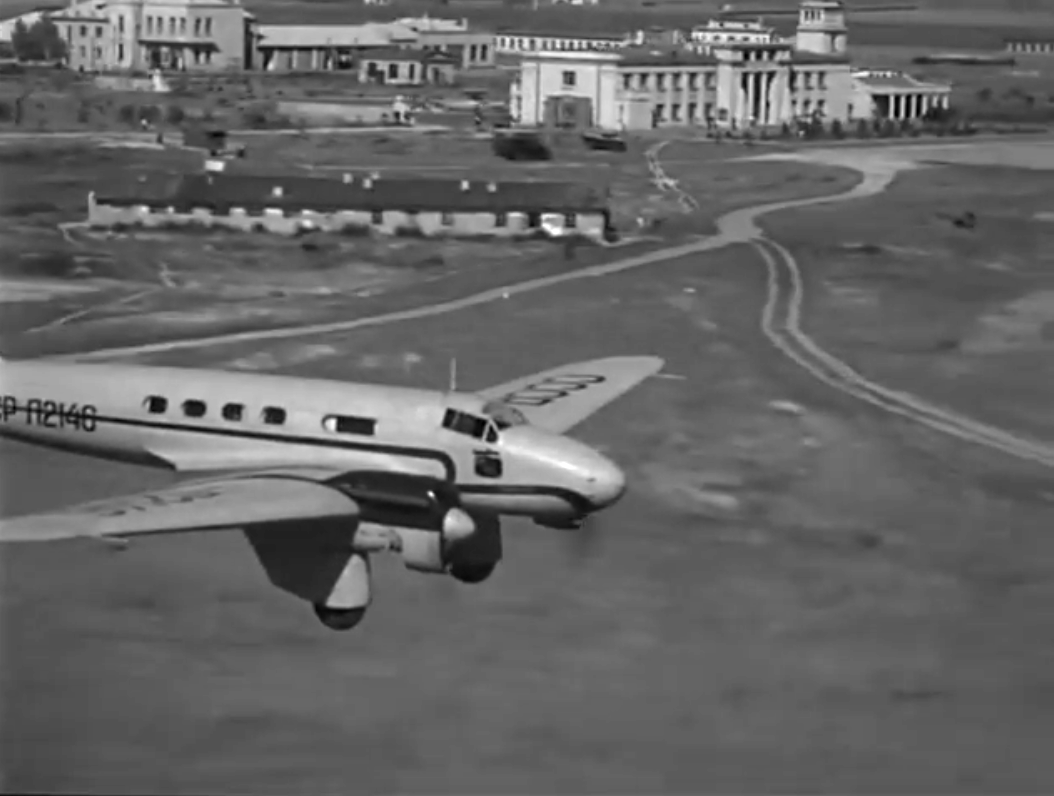

General information
- Type: Airliner
- National origin: Soviet Union
- Manufacturer: Zavod Imeni Goltsmana
- Designer: André Laville
- Number built: 7

History
- First flight: 1935

The Laville PS-89, also known as the ZIG-1, was an airliner produced in small numbers in the Soviet Union in the 1930s. Design work commenced in 1933 to provide Aeroflot with an airliner of contemporary design, to replace the obsolete Tupolev ANT-9s and Kalinin K-5s then in service. Designed by French engineer André Laville, it was a low-wing cantilever monoplane of conventional design, with twin engines in wing-mounted nacelles, and retractable tailwheel undercarriage. Construction was of metal throughout, except for the fabric skinning of the control surfaces. Laville left the project before the prototype was built, and A.V. Kulev replaced him to lead the project.

The prototype first flew in Spring 1935, but on 27 November, it crashed when the horizontal stabilizer failed during a landing approach. Kulev and five others were killed. The crash was attributed to a flaw in the workmanship, not in the design, and work continued on the project under the leadership of P.I. Eberzin.

A second prototype flew in spring 1937, and a small series of six machines followed from 1937 to 1938. All seven were soon put to use on the Moscow–Simferopol route, where they served until the outbreak of the German-Soviet War. Between 29 September and 11 October 1938 S. Fokanov and S. Andreev flew a PS-89 over the capital cities of all eleven republics of the Soviet Union, covering 10,750 km (6,680 mi) in 44 hours and 40 minutes.

== Operators ==
Soviet Union

- Aeroflot

== Specifications (variant) ==
Data from "PS-89, ZIG-1 by A.Laville and A.V.Kulev"

General characteristics

- Crew: 2
- Capacity: 14 passengers
- Length: 16.25 m (53 ft 4 in)
- Wingspan: 25.11 m (92 ft 3 in)
- Wing area: 72.0 m^{2} (775 sq ft)
- Empty weight: 4,980 kg (10,960 lb)
- Gross weight: 7,200 kg (15,840 lb)
- Powerplant: 2 × Mikulin M-17F , 540 kW (730 hp) each

Performance

- Maximum speed: 284 km/h (178 mph, 155 kn)
- Range: 1,300 km (810 mi, 700 nmi)
- Service ceiling: 4,400 m (14,400 ft)
- Rate of climb: 2.9 m/s (580 ft/min)

== See also ==
Related lists

- List of aircraft of World War II
