= Polikarpov I-5 =

Soviet Polikarpov biplane fighter

I-5
- An I-5 in flight

General information
- Type: Fighter
- National origin: Soviet Union
- Manufacturer: Polikarpov
- Designer: N. N. Polikarpov
- Primary user: VVS; Naval Aviation
- Number built: 803

History
- Manufactured: 1931–34
- Introduction date: 1931
- First flight: 29 April 1930
- Retired: 1942
- Developed into: Polikarpov I-15

The Polikarpov I-5 was a single-seat biplane which became the primary Soviet fighter between its introduction in 1931 through 1936, after which it became the standard advanced trainer. Following Operation Barbarossa, which destroyed much of the Soviet Air Forces (VVS), surviving I-5s were equipped with four machine guns and bomb racks and pressed into service as light ground-attack aircraft and night bombers in 1941. They were retired in early 1942 as Soviet aircraft production began to recover and modern ground-attack aircraft like the Ilyushin Il-2 became available. A total of 803 were built (including 3 prototypes).

== Development ==
The 1928 Five-Year Plan ordered the Tupolev design bureau to develop a mixed-construction (metal and wood/fabric) biplane fighter powered by a Bristol Jupiter VII engine with the first prototype completed by 1 September 1929. The new fighter was designated I-5 (Istrebitel'—Fighter), but had the internal Tupolev designation of ANT-12. Concurrently, Nikolai Nikolaevich Polikarpov's group was tasked with creating a wood-construction aircraft designated as the Polikarpov I-6 to the same specification. The I-5 design, begun by Pavel Sukhoi, under the supervision of Andrei Tupolev, lagged because the Tupolev bureau was preoccupied with large bombers. As the result the I-5 and I-6 projects were unified in 1929 under Polikarpov's leadership, although neither project met its specified completion date.

Nikolai Polikarpov was arrested by the OGPU in September 1929 for the crime of industrial sabotage for these failures and sentenced to death, although this was commuted to ten years imprisonment in a labor camp. In December 1929 the OGPU gathered a number of aircraft engineers together at Butyrka prison, including Polikarpov, and formed the Internal Prison Design Bureau (Konstruktorskoye Byuro Vnutrenniya Tyurma—KB VT) under the leadership of Dmitry Pavlovich Grigorovich. The KB VT was transferred to quarters on the grounds of Factory (Zavod) Nr. 30 in Moscow-Khodinka in early 1930. Shortly afterwards Polikarpov replaced Grigorovich as the head designer when his concept for the I-5 was approved by the OGPU. The full-scale mock-up was approved on 28 March 1930 and the first prototype, designated VT-11 (Vnutrenniya Tyurma—Internal Prison), was completed a month later.

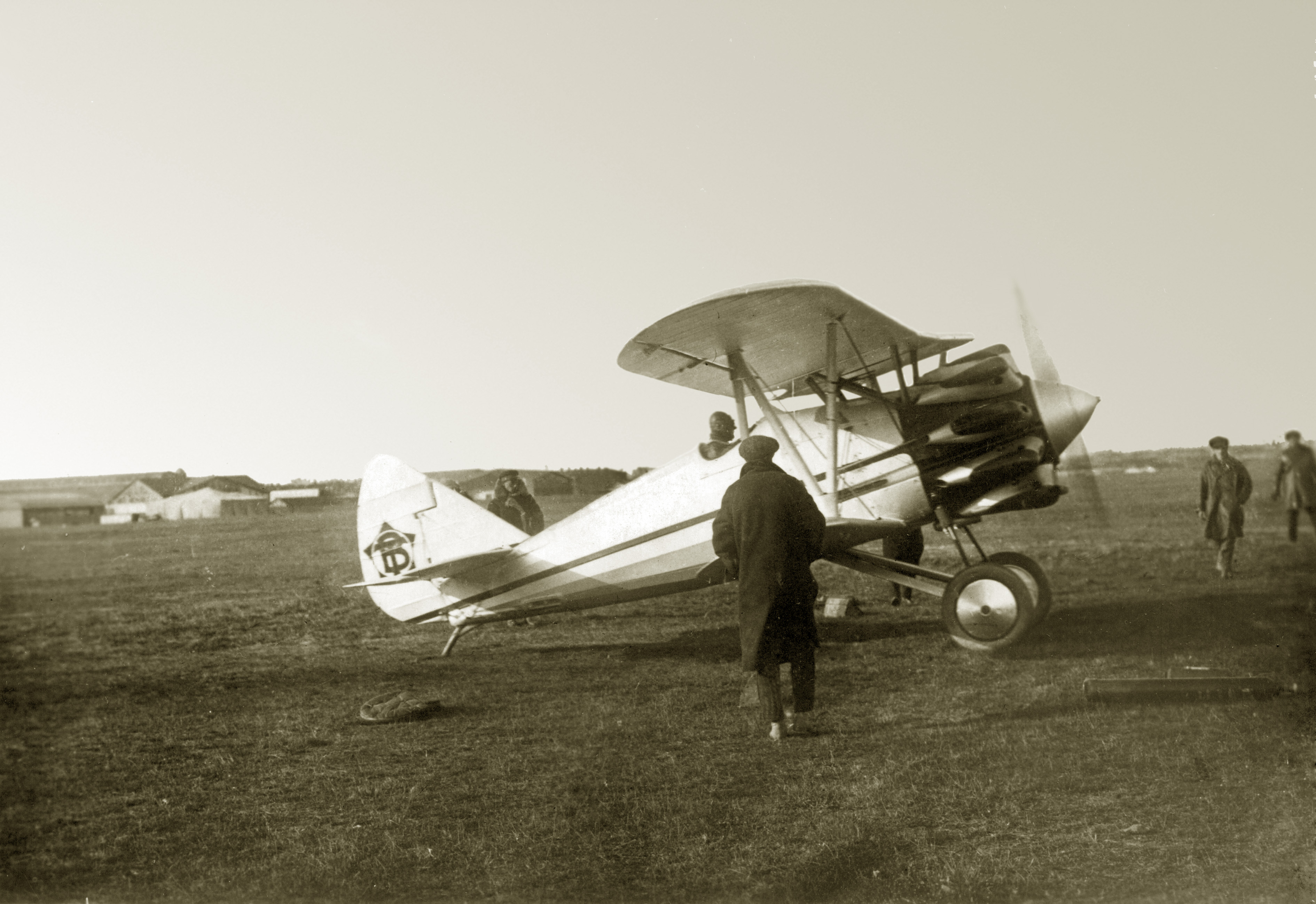
The first prototype - VT-11

It made its first flight on 30 April 1930 and was fitted with an imported supercharged 450-horsepower (340 kW) Jupiter VII. It was painted in silver with a red cheatline; a red "VT" was superimposed on the red star on the rudder. The second prototype, known as the VT-12, had a Jupiter VI engine, and took to the air on 22 May, bearing the name "Klim Voroshilov." The two prototypes also differed in minor details regarding the shape of the tail and the construction of the landing gear. All this meant a slight difference in weight and performance between the two prototypes was present, with the second being slightly heavier and faster, while the first had a slight range advantage and a higher service ceiling. The third prototype, designated as the VT-13 and inscribed with "A Gift for the XVIth Congress of the Party", was powered by a 600-horsepower (450 kW) Soviet-built M-15 engine with a NACA cowling, but this proved to be unreliable and was not put into production.

The second prototype passed its State acceptance trials on 13 August 1931 and was ordered into production a month later on 13 September. One problem noted during the trials was a tendency to make an uncontrolled 180° turn (ground looping) when landing in light winds. Shortening the landing gear by 15 cm (5.9 in) and moving them 12 cm (4.7 in) cured the problem. The engineer who suggest the change was awarded the Order of the Red Star for his ingenuity. Ten pre-production aircraft had already been ordered and they were assembled between August and October. They all had imported engines fitted, but trialled various small improvements for the production aircraft that included cooling vents for the crankcase, introduction of a pitot tube and static vent in the starboard upper wing, a faired headrest for the pilot, and a metal propeller whose pitch could be adjusted on the ground.

== Design ==
The I-5 was a single-seat biplane with the upper wing slightly larger than the lower, and a fixed landing gear with a tailskid. The aircraft was of mixed construction, with the fuselage being made of a framework of welded steel tubes covered by a fabric skin over the rear fuselage, with the front fuselage section being covered by detachable duralumin panels as far back as the rear of the cockpit. There were also detachable panels allowing easy access to the tailskid shock absorber. The fabric skin was laced for tightness and the seams were covered with calico. A fireproof bulkhead separated the 165 litres (36 imp gal; 44 US gal) fuel tank from the engine and a fire extinguisher was fitted with outlets to the fuel pump, inlet pipe and carburetor. The conventional landing gear was connected by a one-piece axle and some aircraft were fitted with teardrop-shaped spats covering the wheels. Initially the tailskid was fixed, but later aircraft had smaller skids that moved in concert with the rudder. Rubber rings were used as shock absorbers on the landing gear.

The wings were built with two spars. The upper wing was made in three parts, with the middle section being of duralumin and the outer ones being made of wood. The wooden lower wings were built in single sections, using a Göttingen-436 profile. The duralumin N-type struts that separated the wings, and attached the upper wing to the fuselage, had a teardrop profile and were reinforced with steel bracing wires. Laced lacquered fabric covered the empennage and wings, except for the roots of the lower wings which were covered in plywood and the leading edges of the wings were skinned in duralumin for the first 150 cm (59 in). Ailerons were fitted only to the upper wing. All movable control surfaces and the tail section were built with doped fabric over metal framing. Bracing wires above and below the tail were fitted on the prototypes, but production aircraft replaced the lower wires with a strut on each side. The horizontal tail was offset 3.5 mm (0.14 in) to port to compensate for the engine's torque, but it could be adjusted on the ground.

Some early production aircraft had imported Bristol Jupiter VI engines with a metal cowling, but the bulk of the production aircraft used the M-22 license-built copy, both of 480 horsepower (358 kW), with a Townend ring. Early aircraft usually had a fixed-pitch wooden propeller with a diameter of 2.9 meters (9 ft 6 in), but these were replaced by a 2.7 meters (8 ft 10 in) duralumin propeller without a spinner that could have its pitch adjusted on the ground.

Two synchronized 7.62-millimeter (0.300 in) PV-1 machine guns were fitted in the fuselage with 600 rounds apiece with an OP-1 telescopic sight. It was hoped to fit another pair, but the extra weight adversely affected the aircraft's performance during tests. Two small Der-5 underwing bomb racks were fitted that could carry one 10-kilogram (22 lb) bomb apiece. Beam-type bomb racks were evaluated on the I-5 that could carry a pair of 250-kilogram (551 lb) bombs, but these had such adverse effects on its performance that they were rejected for service use. One of the tests with these racks had the aircraft diving down upon the target; the first example of dive bombing in the Soviet Union. The I-5 was also used to evaluate the accuracy of the RS-82 rocket, although they are not known to have been used by the aircraft in service.

I-5s called up during the emergency in 1941 were converted for use as fighter-bombers by adding two more machine guns, and some aircraft were fitted with the heavy bombs that had been rejected earlier. The ground-attack version is sometimes referred to as the I-5LSh.

Test pilot Mark Gallai described the flying qualities of the I-5 thus: "After flying it I was convinced that the I-5 is quite a handful, a capricious aircraft. However, if you are careful with the controls and do not offend the machine with rough actions, it will not depart controlled flight."

== Operational history ==
Fifty-four I-5s were delivered to the VVS by 1 October 1931, and 66 by the end of the year. These were all aircraft from Zavod Nr. 1 at Khodinka, but Zavod Nr. 21 in Gorkii began deliveries the following year. It delivered ten in 1932, 321 in 1933 and 330 in 1934. Zavod Nr. 1 delivered 76 in 1932 before beginning production of the Heinkel HD 37 as the I-7. The I-5 was first delivered to units in the Leningrad, Ukraine and Transbaikal Military Districts and comprised 20% of the VVS's fighter force by the end of 1932. During 1933 deliveries began to units in the Far Eastern, Belorussian and Moscow Military Districts and they comprised 40% of the fighter strength by the end of the year. By the end of 1934 most of the Polikarpov I-3s and Tupolev I-4s had been replaced and deliveries had begun to Naval Aviation. The I-5 began to be replaced by the Polikarpov I-15 in 1936, and was completely phased out from front-line use by the end of 1937, but continued to be employed as an advanced trainer.

Following the German Invasion of the Soviet Union in June 1941, the heavy losses of front-line aircraft endured by the VVS together with the disruption of aircraft production resulted in I-5s being removed from training units and returned to combat service as ground-attack aircraft or night bombers until early 1942. Some I-5s were used by the 605th and 606th Fighter Regiments (Istrebitel'nyye Aviatsionnyye Polki (IAP)) during the defence of Moscow as night bombers until re-equipping in February 1942. The 2nd Ground Attack Regiment (Shturmovoy Aviatsionnyi Polk (ShAP)) was raised in September 1941 in the Crimea from reservists and the Kachin Flying School. By 10 October thirty-two I-5s were on hand, although attrition had reduced them to sixteen serviceable. They were down to a total of a dozen aircraft by 18 October. They served until 1 February 1942 when the regiment was withdrawn for conversion to Ilyushin Il-2s and redesignated as the 766th ShAP. The 11th ShAP was raised by the Air Force of the Black Sea Fleet on 22 September 1941. On 18 October it mustered eighteen serviceable and fifteen unserviceable I-5s, although this was reduced to eleven serviceable and eight unserviceable aircraft by 7 November. It kept the I-5s in service until 1 February 1942 when the regiment was reorganized.

== Variants ==
The I-5 was involved in tests of the Zveno project where a Tupolev TB-3 heavy bomber carried three I-5s as parasite fighters. All aircraft were piloted and all had their engines running in the hope that performance would be improved despite the added weight, and in fact performance of the TB-3 was minimally impacted by the addition of the parasite fighters. One I-5 was carried was on each wing and a third over the fuselage. Ramps were used to get the wing-mounted aircraft to their places, but the fuselage-mounted aircraft had to be lifted by hand. Mounting the I-5 in the center was so cumbersome that in at least one case it had its wings and control surfaces removed and was used solely as an extra powerplant for the TB-3 later in the program, leaving only the wing-mounted I-5s free to detach. The aircraft used in these trials used the longer landing gear with smaller tires originally used in the prototypes.

A two-seat conversion trainer, designated the I-5UTI (Uchebno-Trenirovochnyy Istrebitel'—Fighter Trainer), was built by one of the factories. Only about twenty are believed to have been built. The cockpit was moved back and a second one inserted in front of it.

== Operators ==
Soviet Union

- VVS
- Naval Aviation

== Specifications ==
3-view drawing of Polikarpov I-5

Data from Gordon and Dexter, Polikarpov's Biplane Fighters, p. 22

General characteristics

- Crew: 1
- Length: 6.78 m (22 ft 3 in)
- Upper wingspan: 10.24 m (33 ft 7 in)
- Lower wingspan: 7.4 m (24 ft 3 in)
- Wing area: 21.3 m^{2} (229 sq ft)
- Airfoil: Göttingen-436
- Empty weight: 934 kg (2,059 lb)
- Gross weight: 1,355 kg (2,987 lb)
- Fuel capacity: 165
- Powerplant: 1 × Shvetsov M-22 9-cylinder, single-row radial engine, 358 kW (480 hp)
- Propellers: 2-bladed duralumin, 2.7 m (8 ft 10 in) diameter

Performance

- Maximum speed: 278 km/h (173 mph, 150 kn) at sea level
- Range: 660 km (410 mi, 360 nmi)
- Service ceiling: 7,500 m (24,600 ft)
- Time to altitude: 1.6 minutes to 1,000 metres (3,300 ft)
- Wing loading: 63.3 kg/m^{2} (13.0 lb/sq ft)
- Horizontal turn time: 10 sec

Armament

- Guns: 2 × 7.62-mm PV-1 machine guns
- Bombs: 2 × 22 lb (10 kg)

== See also ==
Related development

- Polikarpov I-6
- Polikarpov I-15

Aircraft of comparable role, configuration, and era

- Bristol Bulldog
- Fairey Flycatcher
- Gloster Gamecock
- Boeing F3B
- Curtiss Falcon

Related lists

- List of interwar military aircraft
