= Polikarpov =

Soviet aircraft design bureau

Polikarpov Design Bureau
- Industry: Aerospace
- Founded: Moscow, Russia
- Defunct: 30 July 1944
- Fate: Absorbed into Lavochkin
- Successor: Lavochkin; Mikoyan-Gurevich; Sukhoi
- Key people: Nikolai Nikolaevich Polikarpov
- Products: Aircraft

Polikarpov Design Bureau was a Soviet OKB (design bureau) for aircraft, led from 1922 by Nikolai Nikolaevich Polikarpov. It was based at the GAZ No. 1 aircraft production plant (previously the Dux Aircraft Factory) in Moscow, which was acquired by the USSR in 1920, and where its purpose-built building still stands. During the 1920s and 1930s Polikarpov OKB headquarters designed and built a wide range of military aircraft.

Polikarpov I-5

After the death of Polikarpov on 30 July 1944 at the age of 52, his OKB was absorbed into Lavochkin, but with some of its engineers going to Mikoyan-Gurevich and its production facilities going to Sukhoi.

== Designs ==
Polikarpov designs:

=== Bombers ===
- TB-2 twin-engined biplane bomber prototype, 1930
- SPB (D) twin-engined dive bomber developed from the VIT-2, 1940
- NB (T) medium bomber prototype, 1944

=== Fighters ===
- I-1 (IL-400) monoplane fighter prototype, 1923
- DI-1 (2I-N1) twin-seat biplane fighter prototype, 1926
- I-3 biplane fighter, 1928
- DI-2 two-seat biplane fighter developed from the I-3, 1929
- I-6 biplane fighter prototype, 1930
- I-5 biplane fighter, 1930
- I-13/ANT-32 fighter project, 1931
- I-15 Chaika biplane fighter, 1933
- I-16 fighter, 1933
- I-15-2/I-152 (I-15bis) prototype modernized version of I-15, 1938
- I-15-3/I-153 Chaika biplane fighter
- I-17 fighter prototype, 1934
- I-180 prototype fighter developed from the I-16, 1938
- I-185 prototype fighter developed from the I-180, 1941
- I-190 biplane fighter prototype developed from I-153, 1939
- I-200 (MiG-1) fighter
- TIS (MA) twin-engined heavy fighter prototype, 1941
- ITP (M) fighter prototype, 1942
- Malyutka rocket-powered fighter, abandoned incomplete upon Polikarpov's death

=== Ground attack ===
- VIT-1 twin-engined attack aircraft prototype, 1937
- VIT-2 development of VIT-1, 1938
- Ivanov ground attack aircraft prototype, 1938

=== Reconnaissance ===
- R-1 unlicensed copy of the British Airco DH.9A bomber.
- MR-1 floatplane version of R-1 with wooden floats. 124 built.
- MR-2 (PM-2) floatplane version of R-1 with Munzel metal floats. 1 built.
- R-2 biplane reconnaissance aircraft based on R-1.
- R-4 biplane reconnaissance aircraft (R-1 development, not produced).
- R-5 biplane reconnaissance aircraft, 1928.
- SSS light bomber development of R-5.
- R-Z reconnaissance/light bomber, developed from the R-5, 1935.

=== Airliners/transport ===
- PM-1 (P-2) biplane airliner
- P-5 light transport version of R-5
- PR-5 airliner developed from R-5
- PR-12 monoplane airliner development based on the PR-5, 1938
- P-Z commercial variant of R-Z
- BDP (S) transport glider
- MP powered version of the BDP
- Limozin (D) light transport aircraft, abandoned incomplete upon Polikarpov's death

=== Trainers ===
- Po-2/U-2 "Mule" general purpose biplane, 1928
- P-2 biplane trainer, 1927
