= Nikolai Polikarpov =

Russian and Soviet aerospace engineer (1892–1944)

- Николай Поликарпов
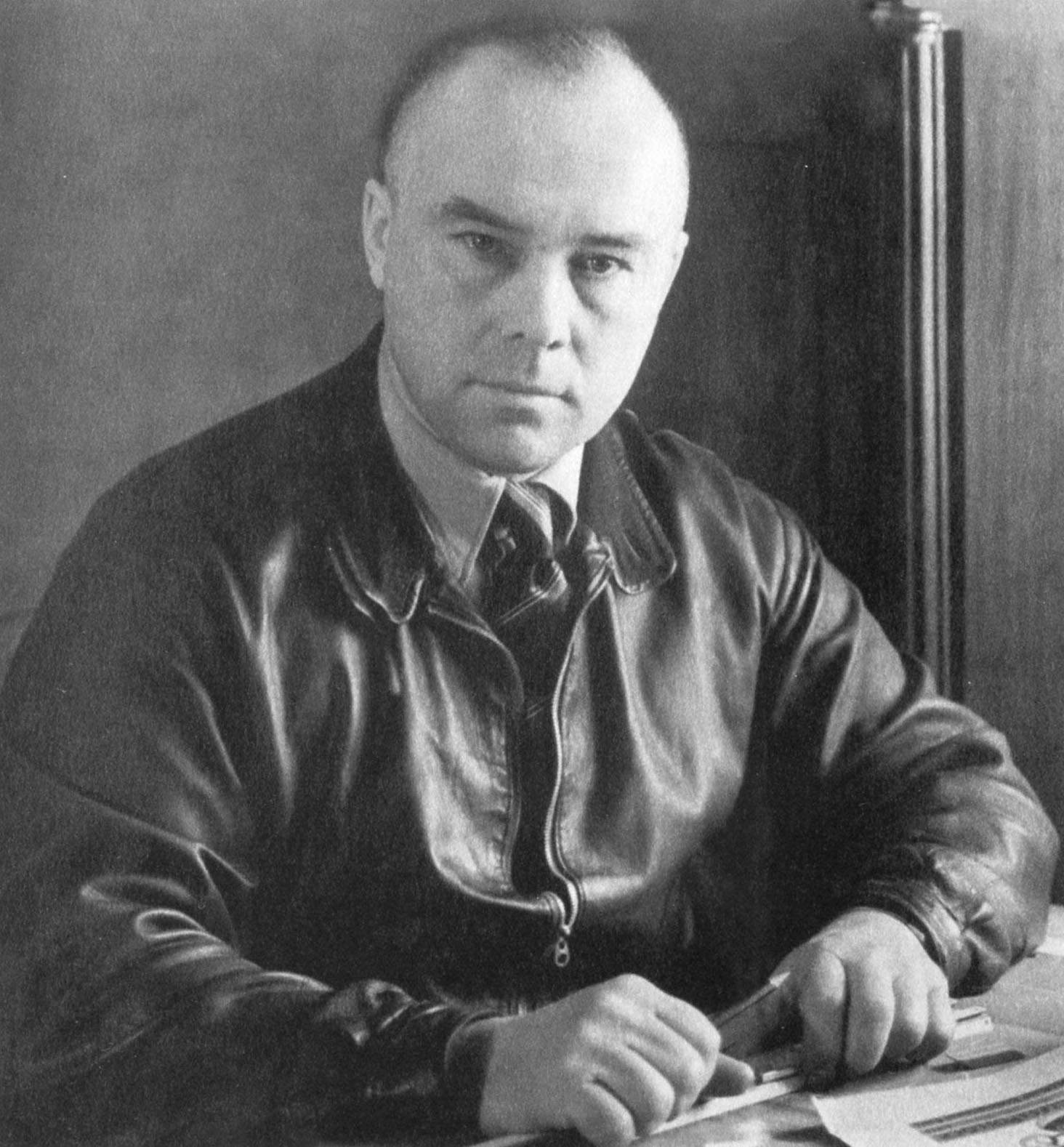
- Polikarpov in 1941
- Born: 9 June [O.S. 28 May] 1892; Livensky District, Oryol Oblast, Russian Empire
- Died: 30 July 1944 (aged 52); Moscow, USSR
- Engineering career
- Discipline: Aeronautical engineering
- Employer: Polikarpov Design Bureau
- Significant design: Po-2, I-15, I-16

Nikolai Nikolaevich Polikarpov (Russian: Никола́й Никола́евич Полика́рпов; 9 June [O.S. 28 May] 1892 – 30 July 1944) was a Soviet aeronautical engineer and aircraft designer, known as the "King of Fighters". He designed the I-15 series of fighters, and the revolutionary I-16 monoplane fighter. In 1939 he lost his design bureau to Mikoyan and Gurevich; in 1943 he was appointed professor at the Moscow Aviation Institute, but he died only a year later in July 1944.

== Biography ==
Polikarpov was born in the village of Georgievskoye near Livny in Oryol Governorate. He was the son of a village priest in the Russian Orthodox Church. He initially also trained for the priesthood and studied at the Oryol Seminary before moving to Saint Petersburg Polytechnical University in 1911, where he became fascinated with the fledgling aviation work being carried out under the shipbuilding department. Polikarpov graduated in 1916 and went to work for Igor Sikorski, the head of production at the Russian Baltic Carriage Factory. While working for Sikorski, Polikarpov helped design the massive Ilya Muromets four-engine bomber for the Imperial Russian Air Force.

== Soviet career ==
Polikarpov stayed in Russia after the Russian Revolution and rose to become head of the technical department Dux Aircraft factory in 1923. Polikarpov was responsible for some of the first indigenous aircraft designs in the Soviet Union during the 1920s, including the I-1 fighter (1923), R-1 reconnaissance plane (1927), U-2 utility biplane (1927–1928), I-3 fighter (1928), R-5 reconnaissance bomber (1928). Notably, the U-2, Russian nickname Kukuruznik (loosely translated: "crop-duster"; post-1944 designation Po-2), remained in mainstream production until 1952 and over 30,000 examples were produced.

In 1928 under provisions of the five-year plan for experimental aircraft design, Polikarpov was assigned to develop the primarily wooden I-6 fighter for delivery by mid-1930. The plan was unrealistic and failed. As such, in October 1929, Polikarpov and around other 450 aircraft designers and engineers were arrested on fabricated charges of sabotage and counter-revolutionary activities, after which he was sentenced to death. In December, after two months of waiting for execution, he was transferred to a Special Design Bureau of OGPU set at Butyrka prison and had the sentence changed to 10 years of forced labor. Polikarpov and the others were moved to Central Design Bureau 39 (TsKB-39) to complete the I-5 project. After a successful demonstration of the new design, the sentence was changed to a conditional one, and in July 1931 he was granted amnesty together with a group of other convicts. It was not until de-Stalinization in 1956 that the criminal charges were officially dropped posthumously.

After the release he initially worked with Pavel Sukhoi since 1931, developing the I-16 in 1933 and I-15 in 1934. Then he worked under Ilyushin in 1937. In 1938 he established an independent design bureau. Polikarpov had plane drawings on the Polikarpov I-180 and made the decision to get the plane built. But the plane was faced with many problems so the I-180 was only made in small quantities and was eventually stopped in production 1940. In 1939 he completed work on the I-153. In 1939 he was ordered to make a trip to Nazi Germany. In his absence, his plant director and chief engineer, along with design engineer Mikhail Gurevich put forth a proposal for a new fighter, the I-200, and received approval to create a new Design Bureau under the leadership of Artem Mikoyan, whose brother Anastas Mikoyan was a senior politician under Joseph Stalin. On his return, Polikarpov found that his Bureau no longer existed, with his engineers at the new MiG bureau. Nine years after his death, in 1953 his plant was given over to the Sukhoi bureau.

Polikarpov was subsequently appointed professor at the Moscow Aviation Institute in 1943. He died on 30 July 1944 from stomach cancer. He is buried in Novodevichy Cemetery in Moscow.

Polikarpov was a recipient of numerous awards, including the Stalin Prize (1941, 1943) and Hero of Socialist Labor (1940). Polikarpov Peak in the Pamir Mountains was named after him.

== See also ==
- Polikarpov design bureau
