= TsKB =

The TsKB (Central Design Bureau) was a Soviet aircraft design bureau established in the early 1930s. It was headed by aircraft designer Sergei Ilyushin.
