= Mikulin M-17 =

V12 piston aircraft engine

M-17
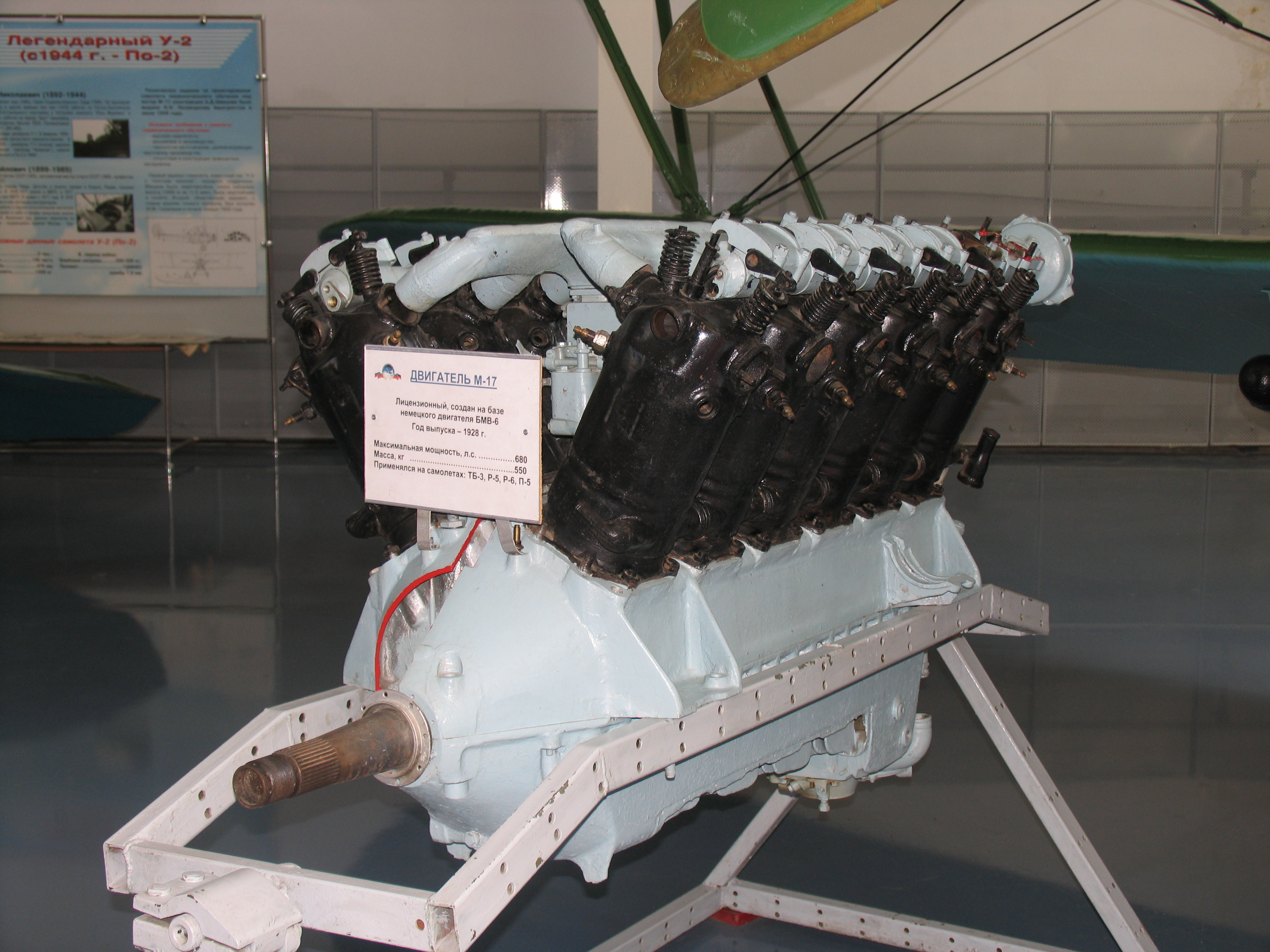
- Type: Liquid-cooled V12 engine
- National origin: Germany
- Manufacturer: Factory No. 26
- First run: 1930
- Major applications: Tupolev TB-3, Polikarpov R-5, Beriev MBR-2
- Manufactured: 1930–41
- Number built: 27,534
- Developed from: BMW VI
- Developed into: Mikulin AM-34

The Mikulin M-17 was a Soviet-licensed copy of the German BMW VI V12 liquid-cooled aircraft piston engine, further developed by Alexander Mikulin and used by Soviet aircraft and tanks during World War II. Production began in 1930 and continued until 1942. More than 27,000 were produced, of which 19,000 were aircraft engines while the rest were used in Soviet tanks of the period.

== Acquisition and production ==
The Soviets had bought examples of BMW's III and IV engines earlier in the 1920s and bought two examples of the VI engine in 1926 for evaluation. Following successful bench trials of the engine the Soviets decided to purchase a license for it. A deal was concluded in October 1927 after prolonged negotiations. The Soviets paid $50,000 and were to pay 7.5% of the price of each engine produced after the first fifty. In exchange, the German company was to inform the Soviets of all changes to the engine for a period of five years. Soviet engineers and technicians were to be trained in Germany and German technicians were to assist setting up production in the vacant factory at Rybinsk. The Soviets also hired a number of German skilled workers to work at Factory No. 26 in Rybinsk, mostly those with communist sympathies.

The need to refurbish the factory greatly delayed Soviet production, even though the more complex components, including all electrical equipment, were initially imported from Germany. Soviet changes to the design and production quality issues meant that the Soviet-built engines were some 31 kg (68 lb) heavier and produced less power than the original engine. The first M-17s, as the engines were designated by the Soviets, were not produced until spring of 1930, but were not accepted for service until an engine passed its service tests on 15 August 1930. The M-17 was the most powerful engine available to the Soviet aircraft industry and it was in high demand, so much that Factory No. 24 in Moscow also began to build the M-17. 165 engines were produced in 1930 at Rybinsk and Factory No. 24 had managed to build its first three engines by June 1930.

Unfortunately, the engines built by the Moscow factory were of very poor quality because the management there had made unauthorized changes to simplify production. These had a compression ratio of only 6.15:1 rather than the specified 6.3:1 and they could produce only 615–630 hp (459–470 kW) instead of the 680 hp (510 kW) of the Rybinsk engines. The Moscow engines, of which only thirty were made, were reclassified as training engines and bought for a reduced price. In the meantime production of the M-17 in Moscow had been cancelled in favor of the M-15. Production of engines at Rybinsk had been steadily increasing, 679 being built in 1931 and 5662 in 1934.

Around 1935, development of a version suitable for tanks was begun. This was called the M-17T and 7951 were built from 1936 to 1939. The advent of the Mikulin AM-34, which was intended as a replacement for the M-17, reduced the need for aircraft models and the Rybinsk factory was producing three tank engines for every aircraft engine by 1936, although production of the aircraft variants continued until the end of 1939 to replace worn-out engines on older aircraft. The M-17L was a version of the M-17T used to power the T-35 heavy tank and was the last model placed into production, 530 being built from 1940 to 1941. A number of engines of various models were assembled from spare parts during World War II, but no records are available as to numbers and types.

== Development and variants ==
=== M-17 ===
The M-17 had an imported ignition system and one Zenith 60DCJ or DCL carburetor. It was built in two versions with different compression ratios. The M-17E6.0 or M-17-6.0, as it was sometimes called, had a compression ratio of 6.0:1, flat-head pistons and a maximum output of 680 hp (510 kW). The other version, sometimes called the M-17E7.3 or M-17-7.3, had a compression ratio of 7.3:1, dished piston heads and a rating of 730 hp (540 kW).

=== M-17B ===
Similar to the improved BMW VIb, a version with a strengthened crankshaft nose, a modified crankshaft end, new valve seats, and smaller exhaust valves was developed. This was designated as the M-17B and it entered production in June 1931. It also was built in two versions with different compression ratios. It could be converted to M-17F standards by exchanging some parts.

=== M-17F ===
The M-17F was entirely a Soviet design, German development of the BMW VI having ceased some time previously, with articulated connecting rods with a stroke of 199 mm (7.8 in), sliding bearings under the pins of the connecting rods, valves copied from those of the M-5, a copy of the American Liberty engine, a K-17a carburettor, Soviet electrical equipment and, from 1935, a generator. This model was optimized for low-altitude operations and was built only in one version with 715 hp (533 kW) that weighed 550 kg (1,210 lb).

=== Experimental aircraft variants ===
A boosted version was developed during 1933–34 with a maximum power rating of 800 hp (600 kW). Three prototypes were built and test-flown in a Polikarpov R-5, but it was not placed into production. One coupled design was tested in 1934 with two M-17s nose to nose, driving a common angle gear, but nothing further is known.

=== M-17T ===
This version was adapted for use in Soviet tanks. It was derated in rpm, used a K-17a carburetor, and an oil coil. Its cooling system was improved and the pneumatic starter was replaced by an electric starter. It had a power of 500 hp (370 kW) and a compression ratio of 6.0:1.

=== M-17L ===
This version of the M-17T was modified for use in the T-35 heavy tank. The front part of the crankcase was reinforced, the lower cover of the crankcase was removed and it reverted to a pneumatic starter. It had a power of 650 hp (480 kW).

== Applications ==
=== Aircraft ===
- Beriev MBR-2
- Laville PS-89
- Polikarpov I-3
- Polikarpov I-7
- Polikarpov R-5
- Tupolev ANT-9
- Tupolev ANT-7
- Tupolev R-6
- Tupolev KR-6
- Tupolev MR-6
- Tupolev P-6
- Tupolev PS-7
- Tupolev TB-1
- Tupolev TB-3

=== Tanks ===
- BT-7
- T-28
- T-35
- KV-1

== Specifications ==
Data from

=== General characteristics ===
- Type: 12-cylinder 60° Vee aircraft piston engine
- Bore: 160mm (6.30 in)
- Stroke: 190/199 mm (7.48/7.83 in) different between right and left cylinder bank due to articulated connecting rods.
- Displacement: 46.9 L (2,864 cuin)
- Length: 1,810mm (71.26 in)
- Width: 859mm (33.82 in)
- Height: 1,103mm (43.43 in)
- Dry weight: 540-553 kg (1,190-1,219lb)

=== Components ===
- Fuel system: K-17 Carburetor
- Cooling system: Liquid-cooled

=== Performance ===
- Power output: 680–730 hp (510–540 kW)
- Compression ratio: 6.0:1 or 7.3:1

== See also ==
Related development

- BMW VI
- Mikulin AM-34

Related lists

- List of aircraft engines
