= Polikarpov I-15 =

Soviet fighter aircraft

I-15 and I-15bis
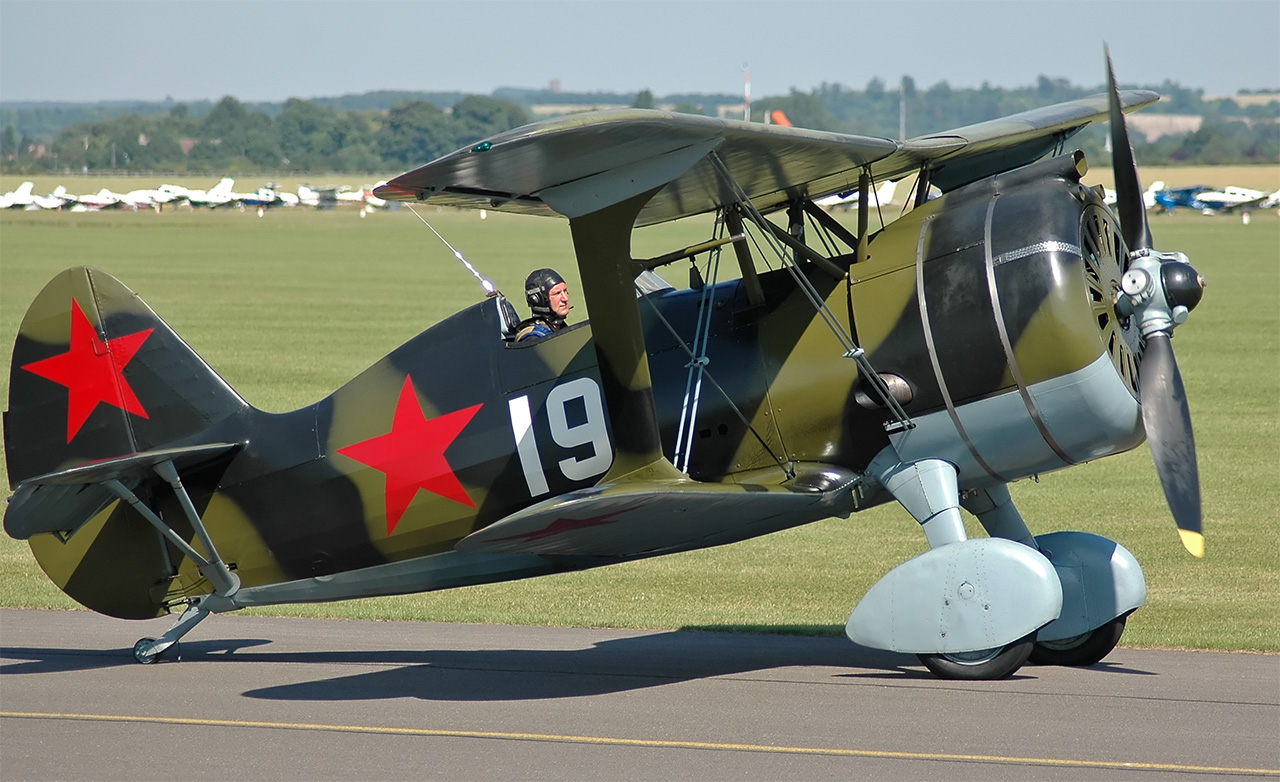
- I-15bis

General information
- Type: Fighter
- Manufacturer: Polikarpov
- Designer: Nikolai Nikolaevich Polikarpov
- Status: Retired
- Primary users: Soviet Air Force Spanish Republican Air Force; Chinese Nationalist Air Force; Mongolian People's Army Air Force
- Number built: 3,313 (plus 3,437 I-153)

History
- Manufactured: 1934–1937
- Introduction date: 1934
- First flight: October 1933
- Developed from: Polikarpov I-5
- Variant: Polikarpov I-153

The Polikarpov I-15 (Russian: И-15) is a Soviet biplane fighter aircraft of the 1930s. Nicknamed Chaika (Russian: Чайка, "gull") because of its gulled upper wings, it was operated in large numbers by the Soviet Air Force, and together with the Polikarpov I-16 monoplane, was one of the standard fighters of the Spanish Republicans during the Spanish Civil War, where it was called Chato (snub-nose).

== Design and development ==
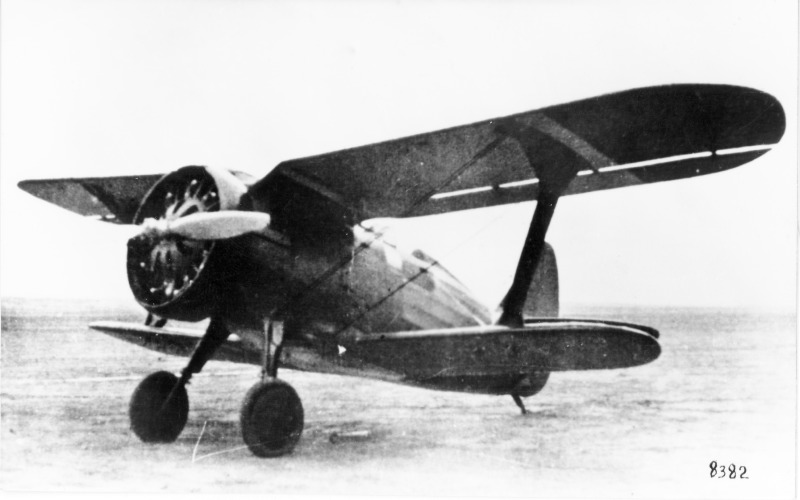
Polikarpov I-15 showing gulled top wing

The design for the 14th fighter for the VVS, the I-14, started as an advanced (for the era) monoplane under the direction of Andrei Tupolev. He grew concerned that the design would not mature, and ordered two backup biplane designs as the I-14A and B just to be safe. Polikarpov had just been released from prison in August 1932, and was handed the I-14A project. When both the I-14 and I-14A were ordered into production, Polikarpov's design, a development of the I-5 fighter became the famous I-15.

The first flight was made in October 1933 with V.P. Chkalov at the controls, powered by an imported Wright R-1820 Cyclone engine. The I-15, also known by its development name TsKB-3, was a small biplane fighter with a gulled upper wing. The single bay wings were of wooden construction, while the fuselage was of mixed steel and duralumin construction, with a fabric covered rear fuselage.

Production started in 1934, initially being powered by the Shvetsov M-22, a licence-built version of the Bristol Jupiter radial engine. While less powerful than the Cyclone, the M-22 powered aircraft were still superior to the I-5 which it replaced, demonstrating excellent manoeuvrability. Production switched to the 515 kW (691 hp) Shvetsov M-25 engine (a license-built, metricified Cyclone) in late 1936. A total of 671 I-15s were built, 284 in the Soviet Union and a further 287 under license by CASA in Spain.

The gulled upper wing of the I-15 was unpopular with some pilots, as it was felt to restrict visibility, so Polikarpov's design bureau produced a revised version, again powered by the M-25, with a longer span un-gulled upper wing. This version, the I-15bis, commenced production in 1937, a total of 2,408 I-15bis' being delivered by the time production finished in 1940.

== Operational history ==
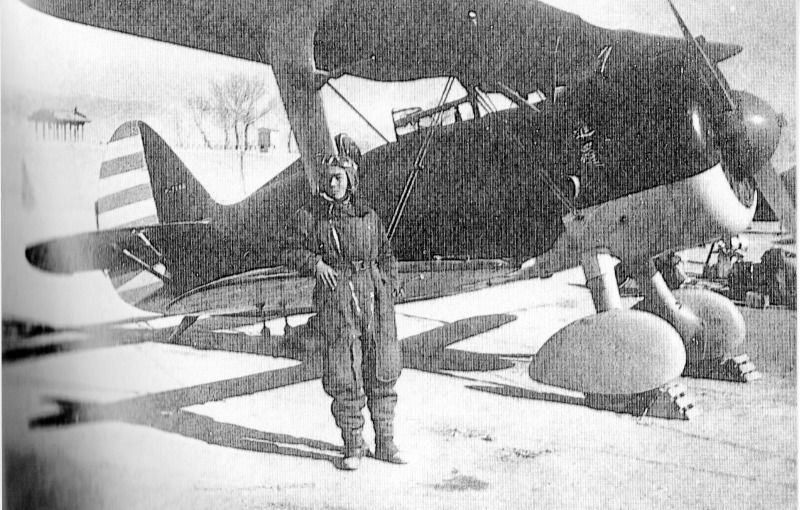
Chinese Polikarpov I-15bis with pilot Xu Jixiang of the 17th PS, 5th PG who fought the new IJNAF A6M Zero-sen air-superiority fighter on 13 September 1940 in the I-15bis during the Battle of Chongqing

=== China ===
In August 1937, the Chinese Kuomintang Government signed a non-aggression pact with the USSR, and in autumn of the same year, the Soviet Union commenced to ship I-15s as a part of a programme of military aid to the Chinese Air Force (CAF) in its defensive war against Japan. More than 250 Soviet pilots volunteered to fly the 255 I-15s supplied to China in autumn 1937. By 1939, the total number of Polikarpov biplanes delivered to CAF reached 347 I-15/I-15bis. The I-15bis also saw a great amount of action in the Soviet–Japanese border conflicts along the China–Mongolia border. From 1938 to 1941, I-15s in the Nationalist Air Force of China, fought many major battles, and skirmishes against invading and occupying Japanese forces, including the Battle of Taierzhuang, the Battle of Wuhan, the Battle of South Guangxi, the Battle of Chongqing-Chengdu, etc. The tough biplane was quite clearly outmatched during the debut dogfight against the new Mitsubishi A6M Zero fighter over Chongqing on 13 September 1940, although I-15bis pilots Maj. Zheng Shaoyu, Lt. Gao Youxin, and Lt. Xu Jixiang were able to target and damage some of the Zeroes, with Lt. Gao believing he had shot one down (all Zeroes returned to base in Wuhan, with four Zeroes suffering some damage); all three of those pilots survived the battle.

Pilot Captain Shen Tse-Liu is credited with 4 victories in his I-15bis, the most with the aircraft in the war.

=== Mongolia ===
In 1939 Polikarpov fighters were extensively used during the Battles of Khalkhin Gol fought around the Khalkha River in Dornod Province. The battles were fought during 11 May–16 September 1939, and involved more than 600 planes. When hostilities commenced, the only I-15bis in the area were 14 aircraft of 70th IAP. Their number increased in the following weeks: on 23 May, 35 I-15bis from 22nd IAP arrived from the Trans-Baikal region. However the Mongolian Polikarpov pilots had been hastily trained and they suffered heavy losses against the more experienced Japanese pilots. During this conflict, the Soviet Union, Mongolia and Japan lost more than 200 aircraft each. 10 aircraft were delivered to the Mongolian People's Army Air Force in mid-July 1939 and flight personnel were trained for rear air defence. Afterwards, they received more than 30 aircraft in March 1942.

=== Spain ===
The I-15 was used extensively in combat by the Republicans in the Spanish Civil War and proved to be one of the best fighter biplanes of its time. The Nationalists called the fighter "Curtiss", apparently believing it to be the Curtiss F9C Sparrowhawk. The first batch of 25 Polikarpovs arrived in Cartagena, Spain, on 28 October 1936, with 15 pilots, led by future ace Pavel Rychagov. A few days later a further group of 10 pilots and 15 aircraft arrived in Bilbao.

The Soviet pilots first went into action 4 November, when I-15s shot down two Junkers Ju 52/3ms and two CR.32s over Madrid, and forced a third Ju 52 and a Heinkel two-seater to crash-land. No losses were reported among the Soviet pilots. During the next two days, Chato pilots claimed 12 more victories, at the cost of two I-15s lost.

On 16 November, while dogfighting with Fiat CR.32s over Madrid, future ace Rychagov was shot down and four days later the number of combat-ready Polikarpov in the central area had fallen to 15 aircraft: seven had been lost in combat, two had force-landed and one was undergoing repair.

In December 1936 and January 1937, two more shipments of 30 aircraft arrived in Spain, making it possible to form four full-strength I-15 squadrons. Until the spring of 1937, central Spain was the main war theatre for I-15s. And in May 1937, another batch of 31 Polikarpov landed in Spain, taking the total number of I-15s delivered to 116.

Chato losses in the Spanish Civil War were comparable to those of its principal rival, the Fiat CR.32. By 1 January 1939, 197 Polikarpovs had been lost: 88 shot down by enemy aircraft and nine by anti-aircraft artillery, 27 destroyed on the ground and 67 written off in accidents.

=== World War II ===
More than 1,000 I-15bis fighters were still in Soviet use during the German invasion when the biplane was employed in the ground attack role. Many were destroyed in the opening hours of the invasion sitting in neat rows on their runways. By November 1943, all examples still in service had been relegated to second line duties.

== Variants ==
Polikarpov I-15bis in flight

TsKB-3bis
Prototype.
TsKB-3ter
Prototype fitted with the more powerful M-25V radial piston engine.
I-15
First production series.
I-15bis
Single-seat fighter biplane, armed with four 7.62 mm (0.30 in) PV-1 or ShKAS machine guns, plus up to 150 kg (330 lb) of bombs. The I-15bis was powered by the more powerful 570 kW (760 hp; 770 PS) Shvetsov M-25V radial piston engine. It had a straight upper wing. A total of 2,408 machines were built.
I-152
Modernised version of I-15bis. One built in 1938. Series production was not undertaken, since it was decided to build I-153 instead.
I-152GK
(Germetichyeskoi Kabine – hermetic (pressure) cabin) – One aircraft fitted with a pressure cabin.
I-152TK
(Turbo Kompressor – turbo-charged) – One aircraft fitted with two turbochargers.
I-15ter (I-153)
Development of the I-15 with retractable landing gear.
UTI-1
(Oochebno Trenirovochnyy Istrebitel' – fighter trainer) – Factory-built two-seat trainer version, front cockpit moved forwards, dual controls fitted, 20 built in 1934 but not used by VVS
Chung 28B
Chinese modified version of I-15bis, powered by 745 hp (556 kW) Wright SR-1820-F53 Cylone. Production of 100 aircraft at Kunming planned, with only 30 completed 1941–43.
A.4
Spanish Air Force designation for the I-15.

== Operators ==
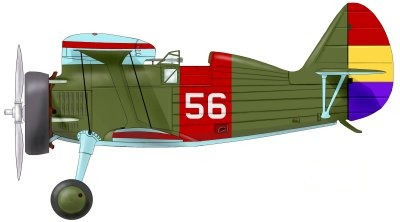
Spanish Republican Air Force "Chato"

China

- Chinese Nationalist Air Force

Finland

- Finnish Air Force (captured)

Nazi Germany

- Luftwaffe (captured)

Mongolia

- Mongolian People's Army Air Force- received more than 40 aircraft in July 1939 – 1942

Soviet Union

- Soviet Air Force
- Soviet Naval Aviation

(Spain) Spanish Republic

- Spanish Republican Air Force

Spain

- Spanish Air Force – Post civil war.

== Specifications (I-15 M-25) ==
Polikarpov I-15 drawing

Data from Of Chaika and Chato…

General characteristics

- Crew: One
- Length: 6.10 m (20 ft 0 in) (tail up)
- Upper wingspan: 9.75 m (32 ft 0 in)
- Lower wingspan: 7.50 m (24 ft 7 in)
- Height: 2.20 m (7 ft 3 in) (tail down)
- Wing area: 21.90 m^{2} (235.7 sq ft)
- Airfoil: Gottingen 436
- Empty weight: 1,012 kg (2,231 lb)
- Gross weight: 1,385 kg (3,053 lb)
- Max takeoff weight: 1,689 kg (3,724 lb)
- Fuel capacity: 260 L (57 imp gal; 69 US gal)
- Powerplant: 1 × Shvetsov M-25 9-cylinder air-cooled radial piston engine, 520 kW (700 hp) at 2,300 m (7,500 ft)
- Propellers: 2-bladed variable-pitch propeller

Performance

- Maximum speed: 367 km/h (228 mph, 198 kn) at 3,000 m (9,800 ft)
- Cruise speed: 285 km/h (177 mph, 154 kn) at 2,000 m (6,600 ft) (max. continuous cruise)
- Range: 510 km (320 mi, 280 nmi)
- Service ceiling: 9,800 m (32,200 ft)
- Time to altitude:
  - 1.1 min to 1,000 m (3,300 ft)
  - 6.1 min to 5,000 m (16,400 ft)

Armament

- 4 × 7.62×54mmR PV-1 machine guns
- Up to 100 kg (220 lb) of bombs

== See also ==
Related development

- Polikarpov I-5
- Polikarpov I-153

Aircraft of comparable role, configuration, and era

- Avia B-534
- Blériot-SPAD S.91/5
- Curtiss F11C Goshawk
- Fiat CR.32
- Fokker D.XVI
- Gloster Gauntlet
- Grumman F2F
- Heinkel He 51
- Nakajima A4N

Related lists

- List of interwar military aircraft
- List of aircraft of the Spanish Republican Air Force
- List of aircraft of World War II
