= Tupolev I-4 =

Soviet sesquiplane fighter aircraft

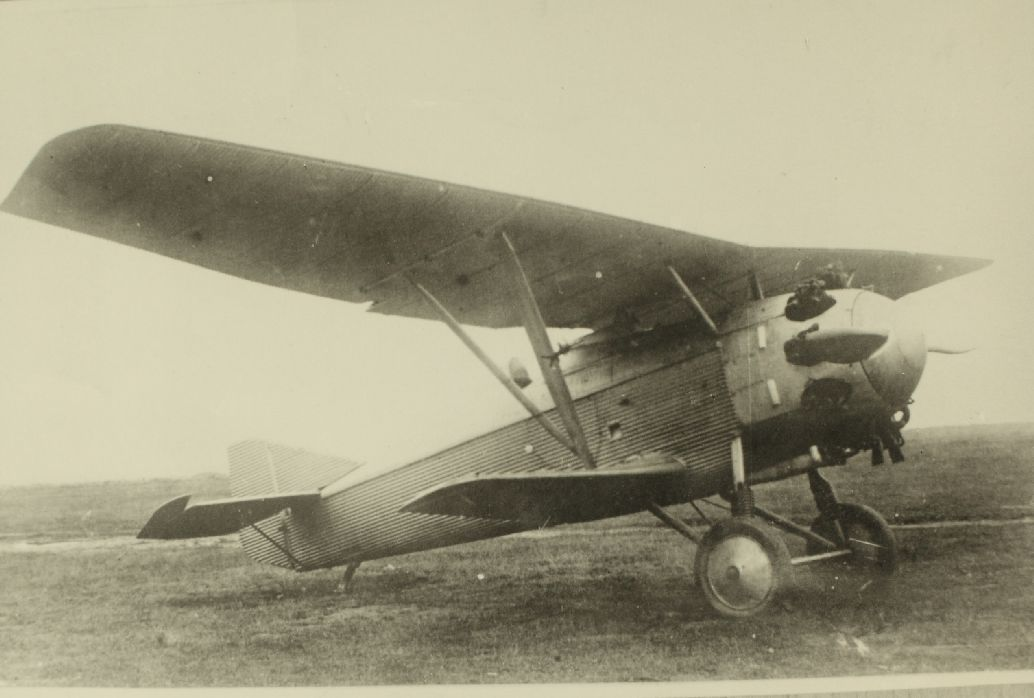

General information
- Type: Fighter
- National origin: Soviet Union
- Manufacturer: Tupolev
- Designer: Pavel Sukhoi
- Primary user: Soviet Air Force
- Number built: 369

History
- First flight: 1927
- Retired: 1933

The Tupolev I-4 was a Soviet sesquiplane single-seat fighter. It was conceived in 1927 by Pavel Sukhoi as his first aircraft design for the Tupolev design bureau, and was the first Soviet all-metal fighter.

== Design and development ==
After the first prototype (under the development name Andrei Nikolayevich Tupolev fighter 5 | ANT-5), the I-4 was redesigned with a new engine cowling to decrease drag, with added rocket launchers on the upper wing and a larger tailfin. The lower wing was predominantly an attachment for the wing struts; it was almost removed in the second series, the I-4Z (where the lower wings were greatly shortened), and totally removed from the I-4bis, thus transforming the aircraft from a sesquiplane into a parasol-wing monoplane.

== Operational history ==
The I-4 was used as a parasite fighter in experiments with the Tupolev TB-1 bomber. The aircraft was in Soviet service from 1928–1933. A total of 369 were built.

== Variants ==
- ANT-5 : Prototype.
- I-4 : Single-seat fighter aircraft.
- I-4Z : Single-seat fighter with span of lower wings greatly reduced.
- I-4bis : Monoplane version (lower wings totally removed).
- I-4P : Floatplane version.

== Operators ==
Soviet Union

- Soviet Air Force

== Specifications (I-4) ==
Data from

General characteristics

- Crew: 1
- Length: 7.27 m (23 ft 10 in)
- Wingspan: 11.42 m (37 ft 6 in)
- Height: 2.82 m (9 ft 3 in)
- Wing area: 23.8 m^{2} (256 sq ft)
- Empty weight: 978 kg (2,156 lb)
- Gross weight: 1,430 kg (3,153 lb)
- Powerplant: 1 × Shvetsov M-22 9-cylinder air-cooled radial piston engine, 343 kW (460 hp) (Bristol Jupiter)
- Propellers: 2-bladed fixed-pitch propeller

Performance

- Maximum speed: 257 km/h (160 mph, 139 kn)
- Range: 524 km (326 mi, 283 nmi)
- Service ceiling: 7,655 m (25,115 ft)
- Wing loading: 60 kg/m^{2} (12 lb/sq ft)
- Power/mass: 0.25 kW/kg (0.15 hp/lb)

Armament

- Guns: 2 × 7.62 mm machine guns

== See also ==
Related lists

- List of interwar military aircraft

== Bibliography ==
- Lesnitchenko, Vladimir (November–December 1999). "Combat Composites: Soviet Use of 'Mother-ships' to Carry Fighters, 1939–1941". Air Enthusiast (84): 4–21. ISSN 0143-5450.
