= PV-1 machine gun =

PV-1
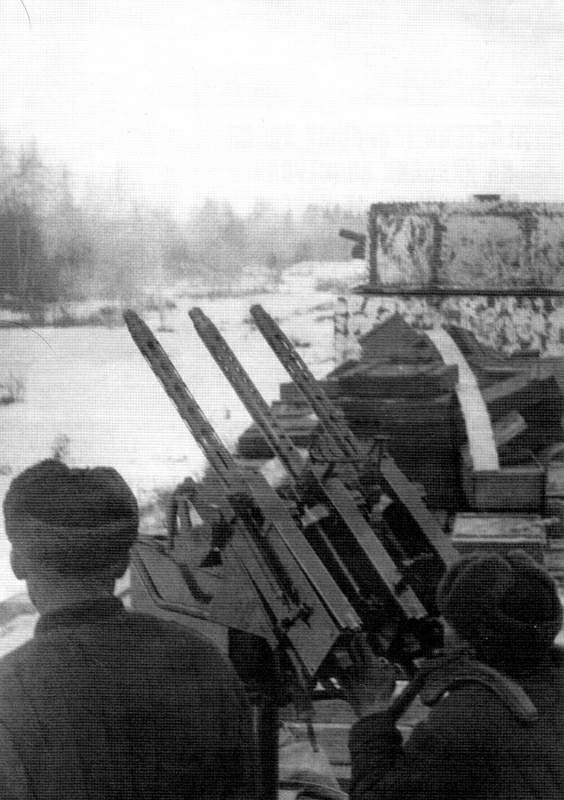
- three PV-1 on an anti-aircraft mount in 1941
- Type: Machine gun
- Place of origin: Soviet Union

Service history
- In service: 1928–1945
- Used by: Soviet Union
- Wars: Spanish Civil War; World War II

Production history
- Designed: 1926–1927
- Produced: 1927–1940
- No. built: ~18,000

Specifications
- Mass: 14.5 kg (32 lb)
- Length: 1,067 mm (42.0 in)
- Barrel length: 721 mm (28.4 in)
- Cartridge: 7.62×54mmR
- Caliber: 7.62 mm
- Action: Recoil
- Rate of fire: 750 Rounds/min
- Muzzle velocity: Model 1908 bullet: 865 m/s (2,840 ft/s); Model 1930 bullet: 800 m/s (2,600 ft/s)
- Feed system: Belt

PV-1 (Pulemet Vozdushny, airborne machine gun, Russian: ПВ-1) is a Soviet air-cooled version of the Russian M1910 Maxim for mounting on aircraft. It was designed between 1926 and 1927. The first prototypes were produced and accepted into service in 1928.

== History ==
The gun was created at the initiative of the Soviet military pilot Alexander Vasilevich Nadashkevich (Александр Васильевич Надашкевич) after he was appointed to the Scientific and Technical Committee of the Soviet Air Force in 1923. His main objective was to obtain a gun with increased rate of fire and reduced weight relative to the M1910. In this endeavor, Nadashkevich collaborated with several engineers from the Tula Arms Factory, including Tretyakov and Pastuhov, who were the spiritual fathers of the M1910 gun, and also with Yartsev and Vladimirov, who later became notable designers of aircraft guns themselves.

The rate of fire was increased from the 600 rpm of the M1910 to 750 rpm by adding a spring that returned the breechblock faster and also by decreasing the diameter (and thus mass) of the recoiling sleeve that housed the receiver-end of the barrel. The latter measure also contributed to a decrease of the gun's weight. The barrel itself was air cooled by a perforated sleeve.

A prototype passed field tests on 19 May 1926. By 1 October 1929, the Soviet Airforce had received 2,480 PV-1 machine guns. Subsequent known production figures were:

- 1932 — 3,019
- 1933 — 1,284
- 1934 — 3,645
- 1935 — 1,915
- 1937 — 1,603
- 1938 — 3,867

Mirrored receivers that were fed from left to right (necessary for wing mounts) were designed in 1929 and entered service in December of that year.

Between 1925 and 1927 Nadashkevich also worked on producing an even lighter variant A-2 by introducing some duralumin parts. This gun was however considered unsatisfactory because its parts wore out too quickly, so it was not adopted for service.

== Mountings ==
=== Aircraft ===
The PV-1 armed the Polikarpov I-3 and Tupolev I-4 fighters and the Tupolev TB-1 bomber. The Polikarpov I-5 fighter was first armed with a pair of PV-1 machine guns with 1,200 rounds total. Subsequent modifications increased the armament to four PV-1 guns with 4,000 rounds total. The Polikarpov I-15 was armed with four PV-1 guns with 3,000 rounds total. The reconnaissance Polikarpov R-5 was armed with one propeller-synchronized PV-1 and one in a rear turret mount. The ground attack R-5Sh variant was armed with four PV-1 guns in the wings, in addition to the propeller-synchronized one.

=== Other types ===
Although the gun was considered obsolete and was gradually being phased out of service, the German invasion of Soviet Union prompted a penury of automatic weapons, so the PV-1s were converted for various other purposes. In August 1941 the gun was adapted to be mounted on a "ZPU" anti-aircraft machine gun base created by Fedor Tokarev. These conversions were made at a factory in Tambov. In 1942, some 3,009 PV-1 guns were converted to infantry weapons by mounting them on the Sokolov M1910 wheeled carriage (the one used in the PM M1910) at a factory in Zlatoust.

== See also ==
- Maxim–Tokarev
- Kulspruta m/42
- List of Russian weaponry
