= List of aircraft (Tu) =

This is a list of aircraft in alphabetical order beginning with 'Tu'.

== Tu ==
=== TU-Braunschweig, Institut für Luftfahrtmeßtechnik und Flugmeteorologie ===
see: Braunschweig

=== Tuareg ===
(Tuareg Aerobatics)

- Tuareg CEA309 Mehari

=== Tucker ===
(Tucker Aviation Co, Detroit, MI)

- Tucker P-57

=== Tucker ===
(Tucker Aviation Co, Detroit, MI)

- Tucker XP-57

=== Tucker ===
(L G Tucker, Pittsburgh, PA, c.1980: Greeneville, TN)

- Tucker Le Petit Cygne
- Tucker Pamela

=== Tumonecotrans ===
(Tumonecotrans / Alexander Filimonov)

- Tumonecotrans BARS
- Tumonecotrans Bella 1

=== Tunison ===
((M C) Tunison Aircraft, Santa Ana, CA)

- Tunison Scout Junior

=== Tupolev ===
- ANT-1 experimental aircraft
- ANT-2 experimental aircraft
- ANT-3 reconnaissance biplane
- ANT-4 twin-engine heavy bomber
- ANT-5 sesquiplane fighter
- ANT-6 four-engine heavy bomber developed from the TB-1
- ANT-7 experimental aircraft
- ANT-8 maritime patrol flying boat
- ANT-9 three (later two) engine airliner
- ANT-10 prototype reconnaissance/light bomber developed from the R-3; lost to the Polikarpov R-5
- ANT-11 twin-hulled flying boat project
- ANT-12 prototype biplane fighter
- ANT-13 prototype fighter/interceptor developed from the I-5
- ANT-14 five-engine airliner/propaganda aircraft
- ANT-15 two-seat fighter project; became the Grigorovich DI-3
- ANT-16 six-engine version of TB-3 and forerunner to the ANT-20
- ANT-17 prototype ground attack aircraft
- ANT-18 ground-attack version of ANT-7
- ANT-19 projected airliner derivative of the TB-1
- ANT-20 eight-engine huge airliner/propaganda aircraft
  - ANT-20bis, six-engine replacement for ANT-20
- ANT-21 four-seat fighter developed from the ANT-7; cancelled in favor of the ANT-29
- ANT-22 armored six-engine reconnaissance flying boat project developed from the ANT-11
- ANT-23 experimental twin-engine fighter
- ANT-24 enlarged version of ANT-16 with M-44 engines, precursor of ANT-26
- ANT-25 single-engine, long-range monoplane bomber
- ANT-26 projected twelve-engine super-heavy bomber
- ANT-27 patrol flying boat
  - ANT-27bis, version with M-34N engines
- ANT-28 freighter/airliner version of ANT-26
- ANT-29 twin-engine fighter developed from the ANT-21
- ANT-29 passenger version of the ANT-27
- ANT-30 twin-engine escort fighter/high-speed bomber developed from the ANT-7 and ANT-21
- ANT-31 single-engine fighter
  - ANT-31bis improved version with a Wright Cyclone engine, uncorrigated wing and new landing gear; lost to the Polikarpov I-16
- ANT-32 projected single-seat fighter
- ANT-33 high-wing airliner project
- ANT-34 multi-seat fighter project
- ANT-35 twin-engine, high-speed airliner developed from the ANT-40; cancelled in favor of license-built DC-3s
  - ANT-35bis version with Shvetsov M-62 engines
- ANT-36 long-range bomber developed from the ANT-25
- ANT-37 long-range bomber based on the ANT-36; cancelled in favor of the Ilyushin DB-3
  - ANT-37bis version for record breaking and research
- ANT-38 high-altitude, high-speed bomber project
- ANT-39 twin-engine, high-speed bomber based on the ANT-29
- ANT-40 medium bomber
- ANT-41 twin-engine, high-speed multirole aircraft
- ANT-42 four-engine heavy bomber prototype; became the Petlyakov Pe-8
- ANT-43 prototype army liaison/airliner based on the ANT-31
- ANT-44 heavy bomber flying boat
- ANT-45 two-seat cannon fighter project
- ANT-46 three-seat fighter prototype developed from the ANT-40
- ANT-47 fighter project
- ANT-48 high-speed sport aircraft project, developed from the ANT-40
- ANT-49 reconnaissance aircraft project, developed from the ANT-40
- ANT-50 twin-engine, high-speed airliner developed from the ANT-43
- ANT-51 short-range bomber prototype; became the Sukhoi Su-2
- ANT-52
- ANT-53 four-engine airliner based on the ANT-42
- ANT-54 high-speed reconnaissance/bomber project
- ANT-55
- ANT-56 high-speed reconnaissance/bomber project; also known as 'SRB'
- ANT-57 high-altitude four-engine heavy dive bomber project; also known as 'PB'; led to the '58'
- '58' first Tu-2 prototype; also known as 'FB' and '103'
- '59' second Tu-2 prototype; also known as '103U'
- '60' third Tu-2 prototype; also known as '103V'
- '61' Tu-2M-82FN; final pre-production prototype of Tu-2
- '62' Tu-2D, long-range version of Tu-2
- '62T' prototype torpedo bomber
- '63' Tu-2SDB, prototype high-speed day bomber version of Tu-2
- '64' long-range, four-engine heavy bomber project developed from the Tu-2; prototype of Tu-4
- '65' Tu-2DB, high-altitude reconnaissance-bomber version of Tu-2
- '66' 52-seat airliner version of '64'
- '67' Tu-2ACh-39VF, version of Tu-2 with Charomskiy ACh-39 diesel engines; cancelled due to the Tu-4
- '71' short-range bomber prototype developed from the Tu-2
- '72' proposed high-altitude medium bomber developed from the Tu-8
- '72' tactical bomber project
- '73' (I) three-engine jet bomber; lost to the Ilyushin Il-28
- '73' (II) short-range jet bomber project
- '74' (I) high-altitude reconnaissance aircraft based on the Tu-2; also known as Tu-22
- '74' (II) mixed-power (two ASh-84 and 1 RD-45) version of '73' (I)
- '75' close-support dive bomber project
- '76' (I) military transport version of the Tu-4; also known as Tu-4D
- '76' (II) version of '74' with ASh-73TK engines
- '77' (I) twin-engine tactical jet bomber based on the Tu-2
- '77' (II) four-engine medium bomber project; also known as Tu-30
- '78' (I) photo reconnaissance version of the Tu-8
- '78' (II) experimental photo reconnaissance version of '73'
- '79' (I) long-range version of Tu-4 with M-49TK engines
- '79' (II) projected photo reconnaissance version of '78', first with imported engines and then Soviet engines
- '81' twin-engine version of '73'; became the Tu-14
- '83' projected bomber developed from the Tu-82
- '84' prototype photo reconnaissance aircraft, initially based on the three-engine '73', then a new twin-engine design
- '86' long-range jet bomber designs
- '87' version of '86' with TR-3 engines
- '88' initial prototype of the Tu-16; also known as Aircraft 'N'
- '89' experimental reconnaissance variant of the Tu-14
- '90' (I) version of Tu-16 with two AL-7 engines and later four AL-5 engines
- '90' (II) prototype turboprop version of Tu-16 with two TV-12 engines
- '92' initial prototype of the Tu-16R
- '93' proposed version of Tu-14T with VK-5 or VK-7 engines
- '94' long-range version of Tu-4 with TV-2 engines
- '96' prototype high-altitude version of the Tu-95
- '97' projected long-range transonic bomber developed from the Tu-16
- '98' prototype swept-wing jet bomber; also known as Tu-24
- '99' projected version of the Tu-95 with VD-7 or AL-7 engines
- '103' projected transonic bomber developed from '97'
- '105' initial prototype of the Tu-22; also known as Aircraft 'Yu'
- '109' Tu-108 with Kuznetsov P-4 engines
- '124' low-altitude bomber project; not to be confused with the Tu-124 airliner
- '127' proposed supersonic bomber/missile strike aircraft
- '145' initial designation for the Tu-22M
- '342' in-house designation for the Tu-95MS
- Tupolev DB-2 ANT-37
- Tupolev DI-8 ANT-46
- Tupolev DIP ANT-29
- Tupolev DPB ANT-37bis
- Tupolev G-1 ANT-4
- Tupolev G-2 ANT-6
- Tupolev I-4 ANT-5
- Tupolev I-8 ANT-13
- Tupolev I-12 ANT-23
- Tupolev I-14 ANT-31
- Tupolev MTB-2
- Tupolev MDR-2
- Tupolev MDR-4
- Tupolev MG
- Tupolev MN projected executive aircraft
- Tupolev MI-3
- Tupolev MK-1
- Tupolev MTB-1
- Tupolev MP-6
- Tupolev PS-3
- Tupolev PS-7
- Tupolev PS-9
- Tupolev PS-35
- Tupolev PS-40
- Tupolev PS-41
- Tupolev PS-124
- Tupolev R-3
- Tupolev R-6 ANT-7
- Tupolev R-7
- Tupolev RD
- Tupolev RDD
- Tupolev RShR
- Tupolev 28-80
- Tupolev SB ANT-40
- Tupolev T-1
- Tupolev TB-1 ANT-4
- Tupolev TB-3 ANT-6
- Tupolev TB-4
- Tupolev TB-6
- Tupolev TShB ANT-17
- Tupolev USB
- Tupolev UTB
- Tupolev Tu-1 prototype three-seat night-fighter version of the Tu-2
- Tupolev Tu-2 twin-engine medium high-speed daylight/frontline bomber; initially known as Aircraft "103"
- Tupolev Tu-4 four-engine heavy bomber, copy of the Boeing B-29; also known as B-4 and Aircraft 'R'
- Tupolev Tu-6 prototype reconnaissance variant of the Tu-2
- Tupolev Tu-8 prototype long-range version of the Tu-2
- Tupolev Tu-10 high-altitude version of the Tu-2; initially known as Tu-4
- Tupolev Tu-12 medium jet bomber prototype developed from the Tu-2; also known as Tu-77
- Tupolev Tu-14 twin-engine light bomber/torpedo bomber developed from the '73'
- Tupolev Tu-16 twin-engine strategic heavy bomber
- Tupolev Tu-20 twin turboprop business aircraft; initially known as Tu-2000
- Tupolev Tu-22 supersonic medium bomber
  - Tupolev Tu-22M strategic/maritime strike bomber; also known as Tu-26
- Tupolev Tu-24 (I) projected high-altitude bomber derived from the Tu-2
- Tupolev Tu-24 (II) utility/agricultural aircraft project
- Tupolev Tu-34 light multipurpose twin-engine VTOL aircraft project
- Tupolev Tu-41 light multipurpose aircraft project; also known as Tu-NN
- Tupolev Tu-44 (I) light aircraft project
- Tupolev Tu-44 (II) light utility aircraft project
- Tupolev Tu-54 prototype agricultural/utility aircraft project; also known as VSKhS and 'Romashka'
- Tupolev Tu-70 prototype airliner derivative of Tu-4; initially known as Tu-12
- Tupolev Tu-75 prototype military transport derivative of the Tu-4; also known as Tu-16 4ASh-73TKFN and Tu-20
- Tupolev Tu-80 long-range bomber derivative of the Tu-4, precursor of the Tu-85
- Tupolev Tu-82 experimental swept-wing jet bomber
- Tupolev Tu-85 long-range heavy bomber derivative of the Tu-4
- Tupolev Tu-91 prototype naval attack aircraft
- Tupolev Tu-95 long-range strategic bomber; also known as Aircraft 'V' or Tu-20
  - Tupolev Tu-95LAL nuclear-powered bomber developed from the Tu-95M
- Tupolev Tu-100 parasite fighter proposal; to be carried by the Tu-108
- Tu-101 assault transport project; lost to the Antonov An-8
- Tu-102 projected 40-seat turboprop airliner based on the Tu-101
- Tupolev Tu-104 twin-engine, medium-range narrow-body jet airliner developed from the Tu-16
- Tupolev Tu-106 supersonic long-range bomber/ASM carrier project; faster version of '105'
- Tupolev Tu-107 experimental military transport version of the Tu-104
- Tupolev Tu-108 projected intercontinental supersonic strategic strike system, in four and six engine versions
- Tupolev Tu-110 prototype four-engine version of the Tu-104 for export
- Tupolev Tu-111 short-haul turboprop airliner project; cancelled as Aeroflot had no need for it
- Tupolev Tu-112 supersonic tactical bomber project
- Tupolev Tu-113 supersonic ASM missile project
- Tupolev Tu-114 large long-range turboprop airliner
- Tupolev Tu-115 military transport version of the Tu-114; also known as Tu-114VTA
- Tupolev Tu-116 VIP transport based on the Tu-95
- Tupolev Tu-117 proposed military transport version of the Tu-110
- Tupolev Tu-118 proposed turboprop version of the Tu-104
- Tupolev Tu-119 version of Tu-95LAL powered by both nuclear energy and kerosene
- Tupolev Tu-120 nuclear-powered long-range supersonic bomber project
- Tupolev Tu-121 experimental strategic cruise missile; also known as Aircraft 'S'
- Tupolev Tu-122 supersonic tactical bomber, further development of '98'; cancelled in favor of the Yak-28
- Tupolev Tu-123 Yastreb long-range reconnaissance drone based on the Tu-121; also known as Aircraft 'D'
- Tupolev Tu-124 short-range twin-engine jet airliner
- Tupolev Tu-125 proposed supersonic long-range bomber
- Tupolev Tu-126 AWACS aircraft developed from the Tu-114
- Tupolev Tu-127 proposed military transport version of the Tu-124
- Tupolev Tu-128 long-range interceptor, also known as Aircraft 'I'; initially known as Tu-28
- Tupolev Tu-129 Tu-127 development
- Tupolev Tu-130 "DP" boost-glider concept; cancelled in favor of the Tu-123
- Tupolev Tu-130 short-range twin turboprop airliner project
- Tupolev Tu-131 unmanned SAM missile, also known as Aircraft 'Z'
- Tupolev Tu-132 (I) proposed low-altitude transonic bomber
- Tupolev Tu-132 (II) nuclear-powered low-lever bomber project
- Tupolev Tu-133 intercontinental supersonic cruise missile based on the Tu-121; also known as Aircraft 'ZD'
- Tupolev Tu-134 SST based on the Tu-106A
- Tupolev Tu-134 twin-engine, narrow-body jet airliner
- Tupolev Tu-135 projected intercontinental strategic ASM missile
- Tupolev Tu-135 supersonic interdiction bomber
- Tupolev Tu-136 multirole VTOL tactical fighter project
- Tupolev Tu-136 Zvezda, proposed spaceplane
- Tupolev Tu-136 projected airliner based on the Tu-134 and Tu-154
- Tupolev Tu-136 LNG development of the Tu-130
- Tupolev Tu-137 strategic missile strike aircraft project; enlarged and revised Tu-135
- Tupolev Tu-137 Sputnik, unmanned version of Tu-136 Zvezda
- Tupolev Tu-138 proposed long-range supersonic interceptor version of the Tu-128
- Tupolev Tu-139 Yastreb 2, proposed reusable version of Tu-123
- Tupolev Tu-139 experimental rocket-powered hypersonic aircraft; similar to the X-15
- Tupolev Tu-140 ASM missile project
- Tupolev Tu-141 Yastreb-P, proposed manned version of Tu-123
- Tupolev Tu-141 Strizh, theater-tactical reconnaissance drone
- Tupolev Tu-142 ASW aircraft developed from the Tu-95; also known as Aircraft 'VP'
- Tupolev Tu-143 Reys, tactical reconnaissance drone
- Tupolev Tu-144 SST
- Tupolev Tu-146 projected long-range ASW/patrol aircraft
- Tupolev Tu-148 proposed long-range patrol interceptor version of the Tu-128
- Tupolev Tu-154 three-engine, medium-range narrow-body jet airliner
- Tupolev Tu-155 version of Tu-155 with liquid hydrogen (later LNG) fuel
- Tupolev Tu-156 turbojet version of Tu-126
- Tupolev Tu-156 (I) AWACS aircraft project
- Tupolev Tu-156 (II) re-engined Tu-155 with NK-89 engines
- Tupolev Tu-158 long-range interceptor project, improved Tu-128
- Tupolev Tu-160 supersonic, variable-wing heavy strategic bomber; also known as Aircraft 'K'
- Tupolev Tu-161 very long-range escort fighter/interceptor version of the Tu-160
- Tupolev Tu-164 projected short-haul airliner ('small airbus') based on the Tu-134
- Tupolev Tu-174 medium-haul airliner project; also known as Tu-154M
- Tupolev Tu-184 twin-engine short-haul airliner ('small airbus') concept; cancelled in favor of the Tu-134D
- Tupolev Tu-184 three-engine medium-haul airliner concept based on the Tu-154
- Tupolev Tu-194 (I) short-haul airbus project
- Tupolev Tu-194 (II) lengthened version of Tu-184
- Tupolev Tu-202 long-range ASW aircraft project
- Tupolev Tu-204 twin-engine, medium-range, narrow-body jet airliner
- Tupolev Tu-206 Tu-204 converted into a testbed for alternative fuels; also known as Tu-204K
- Tupolev Tu-214 (I) long-haul, high-capacity airliner project; spin-off of Tu-184
- Tupolev Tu-214 (II) Tu-204-200s built at Kazan
- Tupolev Tu-216 Tu-204 converted into a testbed for cryogenic fuel
- Tupolev Tu-224 Tu-204 powered by Rolls-Royce RB211 engines
- Tupolev Tu-234 internal designation for the Tu-204-300
- Tupolev Tu-243 Reys-D, tactical reconnaissance drone; improved Tu-143
- Tupolev Tu-244 second-generation SST concept developed from the Tu-144
- Tupolev Tu-300 Korshun, UCAV; modernized version of Tu-243
- Tupolev Tu-304 Tu-204 derivative with a T-tail and two fuselage-mounted turbofans or propfans
- Tupolev Tu-304 (I) wide-body airliner project
- Tupolev Tu-306 widebody, medium-haul jetliner; cryogenic-fueled version of Tu-304
- Tupolev Tu-324 proposed regional jetliner; cancelled in favor of restarting Il-114 production
- Tupolev Tu-330 medium cargo freighter based on the Tu-204/Tu-214;also known as Tu-204-330
- Tupolev Tu-334 short-haul jet airliner concept
- Tupolev Tu-336 cryogenic-fueled variant of the Tu-334
- Tupolev Tu-338 cryogenic-fueled variant of the Tu-330; also known as Tu-330K
- Tupolev Tu-344 supersonic VIP transport based on the Tu-22M3
- Tupolev Tu-354 proposed stretched version of the Tu-334; also known as Tu-334-200
- Tupolev Tu-360 proposed hypersonic strategic bomber
- Tupolev Tu-400 proposed regional airliner/business jet
- Tupolev Tu-404 widebody superjumbo blended-wing jetliner concept
- Tupolev Tu-414 proposed stretched version of the Tu-324
- Tupolev Tu-424 airliner version of the Tu-414
- Tupolev Tu-444 supersonic business jet project
- Tupolev Tu-4X4 regional airliner/business jet project
- Tupolev Tu-504 planned strategic heavy bomber flying boat
- Tupolev Tu-2000 planned hypersonic experimental aircraft
- Tupolev Voron supersonic parasite reconnaissance drone project

=== Turbay ===
(Sfreddo & Paolini S.A., Turbay S.A. / Alfredo Turbay)

- Turbay T-1 Tucán
- Turbay T-2
- Turbay T-3

=== Turkish Air Force ===
(TuAF 2nd Air Maintenance Centre Türk Hava Kuvvetleri)

- TuAF AK-1 Fethi

=== Turner ===
(Bill Turner)

- Turner Gee Bee Model Z Super Sportster

=== Turner ===
(Chris Turner)

- Turner Two Seat Wot

=== Turner ===
((Lawrence) Brown Aircraft Co, Montebello, CA)

- Turner Special a.k.a. Pesco Special

=== Turner ===
( M L Turner, Oklahoma City, OK, 1961: (Eugene L) Turner Aircraft, Fort Worth, TX)

- Turner 40A
- Turner T-40
- Turner Super T-40A
- Turner T-40B
- Turner T-40C
- Turner T-77 Ophelia Bumps
- Turner T-80 Texas Tern

=== Tuscar ===
(Management & Research Inc, New York, NY)

- Tuscar H-70
- Tuscar H-71

=== Tuxhorn ===
( Blaine M) Tuxhorn Flying School, Mid-Continent Air Transport (origin of Ozark Airlines), Kansas City, KS)

- Tuxhorn Air Liner
- Tuxhorn Lark
