= List of Tupolev aircraft =

This is a list of aircraft produced by Tupolev, a (former Soviet) / Russian aircraft manufacturer.

== Tupolev aircraft ==
=== Early aircraft ===
- ANT-1: The first aircraft by A.N.T. and the first Soviet-built aircraft. Mixed materials design. The work started in 1921. Assembly began in 1922. First flight took place in 1923. The tests were cancelled due to engine malfunction.
- ANT-2: Two passenger aircraft. The first Soviet all-metal aircraft, 1924.
- ANT-3/R-3/PS-3: All-metal two-seats recce biplane, 1925. About 100 were built.
- ANT-4/TB-1: All-metal twin-engined (M-17B) monoplane heavy bomber, 1925. There were 212 aircraft built. There was a G-1 cargo version.
- ANT-5/I-4: Prototype of I-4 fighter. The first aircraft designed by Pavel Sukhoi, 1927. 369 were built. I-4 was in service in 1928–1933.
- ANT-6/TB-3: Four-engine development of TB-1, 1930. There was a G-2 cargo version.
- ANT-7/R-6/KR-6/MR-6: Development of TB-1 as reconnaissance (R-6), "cruiser" (escort fighter, KR-6), and maritime patrol/torpedo bomber (MR-6), 1931.
- ANT-8/MDR-2: Maritime long-range recce flying boat, 1931.
- ANT-9/PS-9: Three-engine passenger airliner, 1929.
- ANT-10/R-7: Reconnaissance/light bomber aircraft prototype, 1930.
- ANT-11/MTBT: Twin-hulled flying boat project, 1929.
- ANT-12/I-5: Biplane fighter prototype, 1930. Entered production as the Polikarpov I-5.
- ANT-13/I-8: Fighter/interceptor prototype developed from the ANT-12, 1930.
- ANT-14 Pravda: Large five-engine propaganda monoplane developed from the ANT-9, 1931.
- ANT-15/DI-3: Two-seat fighter project, 1930.
- ANT-16/TB-4: Six-engine version of TB-3, predecessor of ANT-20, 1933.
- ANT-17/TShB/TSh-1: Prototype ground attack aircraft, 1930.
- ANT-18/TShB/TSh-1: Twin-engine biplane ground attack aircraft based on the ANT-7, 1930.
- ANT-19: Projected twin-engine airliner based on the TB-1, 1929.
- ANT-20 Maxim Gorky: Eight-engine huge cargo/propaganda aircraft, 1934.
- ANT-21/MI-3: Multiseat fighter. Development of R-6, 1933.
- ANT-22/MK-1: Armoured six-engine recce flying boat prototype, development of ANT-11, 1934.
- ANT-23/I-12: Experimental twin-engine fighter equipped with two recoilless 75mm cannons, 1931.
- ANT-24/TB-4: Projected enlarged version of ANT-16 powered by four M-44 engines, precursor of ANT-26, 1931.
- ANT-25/RD: Single-engine monoplane long-range bomber. Designed by Pavel Sukhoi. ANT-25RD (RD for "Rekord Dalnosty", i.e. "Range Record") was used in a record flight from Moscow to San Jacinto, California, USA over the North Pole—10,148 km, 1933 (one was built in 1989).
- ANT-26/TB-6: 12-engined heavy-bomber aircraft project, 1932.
- ANT-27/MDR-4/MTB-1: Patrol flying-boat for the Soviet Navy, 1934.
- ANT-28: Cargo version of TB-6.
- ANT-29/DIP-1: Twin-engine fighter. Development of ANT-21, 1935.
- ANT-29 (II): Passenger version of MTB-1.
- ANT-30/SK-1: Twin-engine escort fighter/high-speed bomber aircraft, developed from the R-6 and MI-3, 1933.
- ANT-31/I-14: All metal monoplane fighter, 1933.
- ANT-32/I-13: Single-seat fighter project, 1934. Design revised by Polikarpov, becoming the I-15.
- ANT-33: High-wing airliner project, 1932.
- ANT-34/MI-4: Multi-seat fighter project, early 1930s.
- ANT-35/PS-35: Twin-engine airliner developed from the SB, 1936.
- ANT-36/DB-1: Long-range bomber developed from the ANT-25, 1936.
- ANT-37/DB-2: Long-range bomber based on the DB-1, 1935.
- ANT-38/VSB-1: High-altitude high-speed bomber project, 1934.
- ANT-39:
- ANT-40/SB/PS-40/PS-41: Medium bomber, also erroneously known as SB-2, 1934.
- ANT-41/T-1/LK-1: Twin-engine high speed multirole aircraft, 1934.
- ANT-42/TB-7: Four-engine heavy bomber prototype, 1936. Entered production as the Petlyakov Pe-8.
- ANT-43: Seven-seat army liaison aircraft/airliner project based on the ANT-31, 1936.
- ANT-44/MTB-2 Chaika: Heavy-bomber flying-boat, 1937.
- ANT-45/DIP: Two-seat cannon armed fighter project, 1936.
- ANT-46/DI-8: Prototype three-seat fighter version of the SB, 1935.
- ANT-47/I-20: Fighter project.
- ANT-48/SS: Projected high speed sport aircraft, 1935.
- ANT-49: Projected reconnaissance aircraft based on the SB.
- ANT-50: Projected twin-engine high-speed airliner developed from the ANT-43, 1937.
- ANT-51/SZ: Short-range bomber prototype, 1937. Entered production as the Sukhoi Su-2.
- ANT-52:
- ANT-53: Proposed four-engine airliner based on the TB-7, 1936. The design was similar to the Boeing 307.
- ANT-54:
- ANT-55:
- ANT-56/SRB: High-speed reconnaissance/bomber project, 1940.
- '57'/PB: High-altitude heavy dive bomber project, 1939.
- '58'/FB/'103': First prototype of the Tu-2, 1940.
- '59'/'103U': Second prototype of the Tu-2, 1941.
- '60'/'103V'/Tu-2: Third prototype of the Tu-2.
- '64': Long-range four-engine bomber project, prototype of Tu-4, 1943. Also known as Tu-10.
- '66': 52-seat airliner variant of ANT-64, 1944.

=== Experimental aircraft ===
- Tu-1 (ANT-63): prototype night-fighter variant of the Tu-2, 1946
- Tu-6: prototype reconnaissance variant of the Tu-2, 1946
- Tu-8 (ANT-69): prototype long-range bomber variant of the Tu-2, 1947
- Tu-10 "Frosty" (ANT-68): prototype high-speed bomber, developed from the Tu-2, 1943
- Tu-12 (also known as Tu-77): medium jet bomber prototype, developed from the Tu-2, 1947
- Tu-18 (also known as Tu-72): jet-powered version of the Tu-8, 1947
- Tu-20 (also known as Tu-73): jet-powered short-range bomber project, 1947
- Tu-20 (II) twin-engine turboprop business aircraft; initially known as Tu-2000
- Tu-22: high-altitude reconnaissance aircraft developed from the Tu-2, 1947
- Tu-24: high-altitude bomber project developed from the Tu-2, 1946
- Tu-26: original designation of Tu-22M
- Tu-28 (also known as Tu-76): bomber project, 1947
- Tu-30: four-engine bomber project, 1947
- Tu-54: prototype agricultural aircraft, 1992
- Tu-64: light multipurpose aircraft project
- Tu-70 "Cart": prototype airliner variant of the Tu-4, 1946
- Tu-71: prototype short-range bomber developed from the Tu-2, 1946
- Tu-72: medium bomber project, 1940s
- Tu-73: three-engined development of the Tu-18, 1947
- Tu-74 (also known as Tu-73R): proposed high-altitude reconnaissance aircraft developed from the Tu-73
- Tu-75: prototype cargo/transport variant of the Tu-4, 1950
- Tu-76 (I): radial/jet engined torpedo bomber project developed from the Tu-74, 1946
- Tu-76 (II): twin-engined medium bomber project, 1947
- Tu-76 (III) (also known as Tu-4D): military transport variant of the Tu-4
- Tu-78: reconnaissance version of Tu-73, 1948
- Tu-79 (I): as Tu-4 but powered by M-49TK engines
- Tu-79 (II): as Tu-78 but powered by Soviet engines, 1949; previously known as Tu-73R
- Tu-80: prototype long-range bomber variant of the Tu-4, predecessor of Tu-85, 1949
- Tu-81 (I): twin-engined medium bomber project developed from the Tu-73, 1949
- Tu-81 (II): initial prototype of the Tu-14
- Tu-82 "Butcher" (also known as Tu-22): experimental swept-wing jet bomber, 1949
- Tu-83: bomber project developed from the Tu-82, 1949
- Tu-84: prototype reconnaissance aircraft, 1948
- Tu-85 "Barge": prototype long-range heavy bomber variant of the Tu-4, 1951
- Tu-86: long-range jet bomber project, 1949
- Tu-87: version of Tu-86 with TR-3 engines
- Tu-88: initial prototype of the Tu-16, 1952
- Tu-89 (also known as Tu-14R): prototype reconnaissance variant of the Tu-14, 1951
- Tu-90: prototype turboprop-powered variant of the Tu-16, 1954
- Tu-91 "Boot": prototype naval attack aircraft, 1954
- Tu-92: initial prototype of the Tu-16R, 1955
- Tu-93: proposed version of Tu-14T powered by VK-5 or VK-7 engines, 1952
- Tu-94: prototype turboprop-powered variant of the Tu-4, 1950
- Tu-95LAL: prototype nuclear-powered aircraft based on the Tu-95M, 1961
- Tu-96: prototype long-range intercontinental high-altitude strategic bomber variant of the Tu-95, 1956
- Tu-97: long-range transonic bomber project developed from the Tu-16
- Tu-98 "Backfin" (also known as Tu-24): prototype swept-wing jet bomber, 1956
- Tu-99: prototype turbojet version of the Tu-96
- Tu-100: proposed parasite bomber, 1953
- Tu-101: assault transport project, 1952
- Tu-102: 40-seat turboprop airliner project based on the Tu-101, 1952
- Tu-103: transonic bomber developed from the Tu-97
- Tu-105: initial prototype of the Tu-22, 1954
- Tu-106: Tu-22 with NK-6 engines, 1954
- Tu-107: prototype military transport variant of the Tu-104, 1958
- Tu-108: intercontinental supersonic strategic strike system, 1952
- Tu-109: version of Tu-108 with four P-4 non-afterburning turbofan engines.
- Tu-110 "Cooker": prototype long-range airliner developed from the Tu-104, 1957
- Tu-111: twin-engine, 24-seat turboprop airliner project, 1954
- Tu-112: proposed supersonic tactical bomber, 1955
- Tu-115 (also known as Tu-114VTA): proposed military transport variant of the Tu-114; cancelled in favor of the Antonov An-22
- Tu-117: proposed military transport version of the Tu-110
- Tu-118: medium-haul turboprop airliner based on the Tu-104
- Tu-119: prototype nuclear and kerosene powered version of the Tu-95LAL
- Tu-120: proposed nuclear-powered supersonic bomber
- Tu-122: supersonic bomber project based on Tu-98, 1957
- Tu-124: low-altitude bomber project, 1957
- Tu-125: proposed medium-range supersonic bomber, 1958
- Tu-127 (I): proposed supersonic tactical bomber developed from the Tu-98, 1958
- Tu-127 (II): proposed military cargo version of Tu-124
- Tu-129: supersonic bomber project developed from the Tu-127, 1959
- Tu-130: short-range twin turboprop airliner, 1990s
- Tu-130 (II): twin-boom cryogenic aircraft project
- Tu-132: proposed low-altitude transonic bomber, 1958
- Tu-134 (1960): SST project developed from the Tu-106, 1960
- Tu-135 (I): supersonic strategic bomber project derived from the Tu-95, 1958
- Tu-135 (II): supersonic interdiction bomber, 1960
- Tu-136 (I): VTOL fighter project, 1963
- Tu-136 Zvezda: proposed spaceplane
- Tu-136 (III): LNG development of Tu-130, 1990s
- Tu-136 (IV): cryogenic LNG-powered feederliner project, 1998
- Tu-137: supersonic strategic bomber project, revised Tu-135
- Tu-138: proposed long-range supersonic interceptor of the Tu-28
- Tu-139: hypersonic aircraft project (similar to the X-15)
- Tu-145: prototype for Tu-22M
- Tu-146: long-range ASW/patrol aircraft project, late 1980s
- Tu-148: proposed long-range patrol interceptor version of the Tu-28
- Tu-155: a Tu-154 converted into a testbed for alternative fuels, 1988
- Tu-156 (I): turbojet-powered version of Tu-126, 1970
- Tu-156 (II): a re-engined Tu-155, late 1980s; never built
- Tu-161: strategic bomber project developed from the Tu-160
- Tu-164 (I): short-haul airliner based on the Tu-134, 1968
- Tu-170: conventional version of Tu-160
- Tu-174: proposed lengthened variant of the Tu-154; also known as Tu-154M
- Tu-184 (I): twin-engine short-haul airliner concept, early 1970s
- Tu-184 (II): three-engine medium-haul airliner project based on the Tu-154, late 1970s
- Tu-194 (I): proposed short-haul variant of the Tu-184, 1973
- Tu-194 (II): stretched version of Tu-184
- Tu-202: ASW aircraft project, early 1970s
- Tu-204 (I): twin-engine short-haul airliner project
- Tu-204 (II): medium-haul airliner project; precursor of the current Tu-204
- Tu-206: a Tu-204 converted into a testbed for alternative fuels; later renamed Tu-204K
- Tu-214: four-engine long-haul airliner project based on the Tu-184
- Tu-216: a Tu-204 converted into a testbed for cryogenic fuel
- Tu-230 (also known as Tu-260): hypersonic attack aircraft project, 1983
- Tu-230 (II): twin-engine military cargo transport; cancelled in favor of Ilyushin Il-214
- Tu-244: second-generation SST concept developed from the Tu-144, 1979
- Tu-245: projected development of the Tu-22M3
- Tu-304: medium-haul propfan airliner project based on the Tu-204, mid-1980s
- Tu-330: cargo freighter project based on the Tu-204/Tu-214
- Tu-334: short haul jet airliner concept, 1999
- Tu-344: supersonic business jet concept based on the Tu-22M3
- Tu-360: hypersonic strategic bomber project, 1980s
- Tu-400: regional airliner/business jet project
- Tu-404: long-range extra large flying-wing airliner concept, 1991
- Tu-444: supersonic business jet concept, 2003
- Tu-4X4: regional airliner/business jet project
- Tu-504: projected strategic heavy bomber flying boat based on the Tu-85, 1950
- Tu-534: proposed airliner based on the Tu-204, 2007
- Tu-2000: proposed spaceplane

=== Bombers and other military types ===
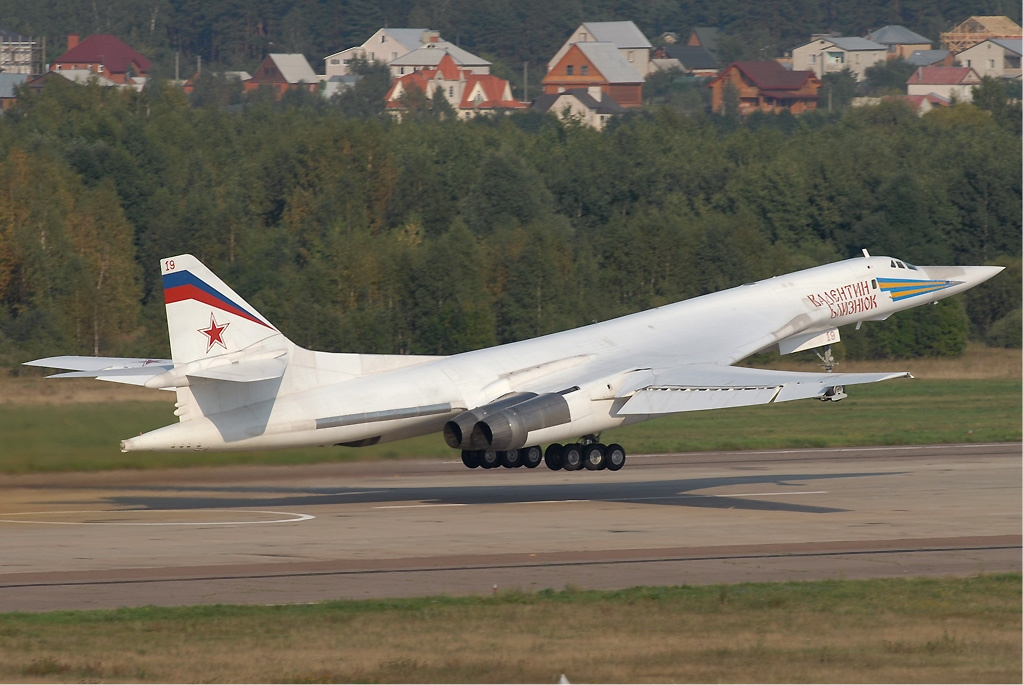
Tu-160, the last of the Soviet bombers

- Tu-2 "Bat": 3-seat medium bomber, 1941
- Tu-4 "Bull": copied from several seized Boeing B-29 Superfortress. Initial name is B-4 (A.N.T. did not want to give his name to an aircraft designed outside his bureau), 1947
- Tu-14 "Bosun" (also known as the Tu-81) torpedo bomber, 1949
- Tu-16 "Badger" strategic bomber, 1952
- Tu-20/Tu-95 "Bear" long-range strategic bomber and modifications, 1952
  - Tu-142 "Bear F/Bear J", anti-submarine/reconnaissance
- Tu-22 "Blinder" supersonic medium bomber, 1959
- Tu-22M/Tu-26 "Backfire" supersonic swing-wing long-range/maritime strike bomber, 1969
- Tu-126 "Moss" airborne early warning (AEW) and control aircraft variant of the Tu-114
- Tu-160 "Blackjack" supersonic swing-wing strategic bomber

=== Interceptors ===
- Tu-28/Tu-128 "Fiddler"

=== Airliners/transport ===
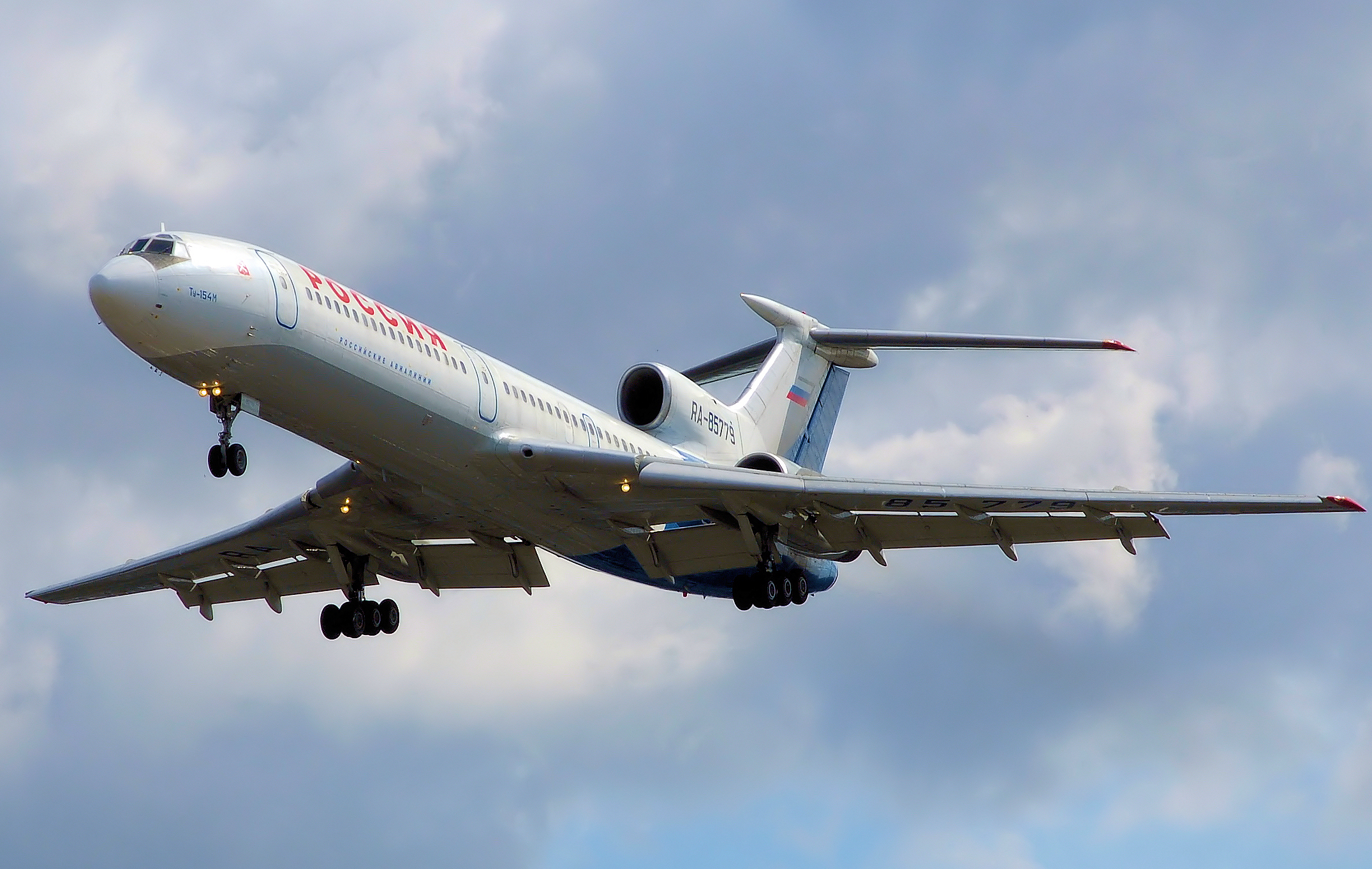
Tupolev Tu-154M.

- Tu-104 "Camel" medium-range airliner developed from the Tu-16
- Tu-114 Rossiya "Cleat" long-range airliner developed from the Tu-95
- Tu-116 two Tu-95 bombers fitted with passenger cabins
- Tu-124 "Cookpot" a short-haul jet airliner developed from the Tu-104
- Tu-134 "Crusty" a rear-engine evolution of the Tu-124
- Tu-144 "Charger" the world's first supersonic airliner; the second one is the more successful Concorde
- Tu-154 "Careless" a medium-range narrow-body jet airliner
- Tu-204 a medium-range narrow-body jet airliner
- Tu-214 Tu-204-200's built in Kazan by KAPO
- Tu-224 Tu-214 powered by two Rolls-Royce RB211 engines; initially known as Tu-214A
- Tu-234 shortened, longer range version of the Tu-204

=== Unmanned aircraft ===
- Tu-113: proposed unmanned flying bomb, 1955
- Tu-121 "S": unmanned drone prototype, 1959
- Tu-123 Yastreb-1/DBR-1: long-range reconnaissance drone developed from the Tu-121, 1961
- Tu-130 "KR": projected unmanned three-stage intercontinental boost-glide missile, 1957
- Tu-131: unmanned surface-to-air missile interceptor prototype, 1959
- Tu-133: intercontinental cruise missile based on the Tu-121, 1957
- Tu-137 Sputnik: unmanned spaceplane project developed from the Tu-136 Zvezda
- Tu-139 Yastreb-2/DBR-2: prototype reusable version of the Tu-123, 1968
- Tu-140 ASM missile project
- Tu-141 Yastreb-P: prototype manned version of the Tu-123
- Tu-141 Strizh: medium-range reconnaissance drone developed from the Tu-123
- Tu-143 Reis: short-range reconnaissance drone, 1976
- Tu-243 Reis-D: stretched and improved version of the Tu-143, late 1990s
- Tu-300 Korshun: modernized version of the Tu-143, 1995
- Voron, supersonic reconnaissance drone prototype

=== Planned aircraft ===
- Frigate Ecojet: wide body civil airliner project; initially known as Tu-304
- PAK DA: next generation strategic bomber
- Tu-324: a regional airliner concept
- Tu-414: a stretched Tu-324
- Tu-454: a long-haul passenger aircraft
- Tu-184: a concept for a short- to medium-haul passenger aircraft carrying around 140–220 passengers. It featured wide-body designs and multiple engine configurations based on D-30 engines. The project never moved beyond the design stage and was eventually cancelled.

=== Boats ===
- ANT-1, speedboat, 1922.
- ANT-2, the first all-metal boat, 1923.
- GANT-3 Pervenets, torpedo boat, 1928.
- ANT-4/Sh-4 Tupolev, 1927.
- ANT-5/G-5, 1933.

=== Aerosledge ===
- A-3 Aerosledge
