= Soviet Union military aircraft designation systems =

Pre-revolutionary Imperial Russia (before 1917) did not have a single national unified system but instead relied on those provided by the manufacturers of the aircraft, like Sikorsky Ilya Muromets or Anatra Anasal.

== Pre-war Soviet system ==
The Soviet system used from shortly after the revolution in 1923 and until gradually superseded after 1940, was divided by function, with numbers assigned in order by the government. Duplicate designations were common, as were multiple meanings for individual letters. Designers and manufacturers also had their own internal designations which could be confused for the official government designations. For instance, Tupolev's designs used the designator ANT, for A.N.Tupolev and Yakovlev's designs used AIR, for A.I.Rykov, the communist leader he reported to. Not all designations were taken up, some numbers were assigned to projects that were subsequently cancelled, often at a very early stage of development.

=== Type prefixes ===
(Cyrillic characters in parentheses)

- A (А) - Avtozhir (autogiro)
  - A-4 - TsAGI
  - A-7 - Kamov
- ARK (AРК) - ARKtichyeskii (arctic = arctic exploration aircraft)
  - ARK-3 - Chyetverikov
  - ARK-4 - Chyetverikov
  - ARK-5 - Polikarpov R-5
- B (Б) - Bombardirovshchik (bomber) (Generic designation - not used for specific types)
- BI (БИ) - Blitzniy Istrebitel (short/close-range fighter)
  - BI-1 - Bereznyak-Isayev
- BB (ББ) - Blizhniy Bombardirovshchik (short-range bomber)
  - BB-1 - Sukhoi Su-2
  - BB-2 - Grushin
  - BB-22 - Yakovlev Yak-2
  - BB-22bis - Yakovlev Yak-4
- BSh (БШ) - Bronirovannyi Shturmovik (Armored Ground Attack aircraft)
  - BSh-1 - Vultee V-11
  - BSh-2 - Ilyushin Il-2
- DI (ДИ) - Dvukhmestnyi Istrebitel (two-seat fighter)
  - DI-1: Polikarpov
  - DI-2: Polikarpov
  - DI-3: Grigorovich
  - DI-4: Laville
  - DI-5: Kochyerigin/TsKB-2 (project)
  - DI-6: Kochyerigin/TsKB-11
  - DI-7: Polikarpov/TsKB-14 (project)
  - DI-8: Tupolev ANT-46/Tupolev SB
- DIP (ДИП) - Dvukhmotorny Istrebitel Pushechny (twin engine cannon fighter)
  - DIP: Tupolev ANT-29
- DB (ДБ) - Dalniy Bombardirovshchik (long-range bomber)
  - DB-1: Tupolev ANT-36
  - DB-2: Tupolev ANT-37
  - DB-3: Ilyushin TsKB-30, precursor of Il-4
  - DB-4: Ilyushin TsKB-56 (prototype only)
  - DB-240: Yermolayev, redesignated Yer-2
  - DB-A - Bolkhovitinov
  - DB-LK - Belyayev
- FB (ФБ) - Frontovoy Bombardirovshchik (front-line bomber)
  - FB: Tupolev Tu-2
- G (Г) - Gruzovoi (cargo, usually converted heavy bomber)
  - G-1: Tupolev TB-1 as transport
  - G-2: Tupolev TB-3 as transport
- GST (ГСТ) - Gydro Samolyot Transportnyj (cargo hydroplane)
  - GST - Consolidated PBY Catalina
- I (И) - Istrebitel (destroyer = fighter)
  - I-Z - Grigorovich
  - I-1 - Polikarpov
  - I-1 - Grigorovich (duplicated designation)
  - I-2 - Grigorovich
  - I-3 - Polikarpov
  - I-4 - Tupolev ANT-5
  - I-5 - Polikarpov. Initially Tupolev I-5/ANT-12, later Polikarpov I-6 redesignated I-5.
  - I-6 - Polikarpov. Renamed to I-5 after winning competition with Tupolev I-5.
  - I-7 - Heinkel HD-37 (licensed-built German aircraft)
  - I-8 - Tupolev ANT-13
  - I-9 - Grigorovich
  - I-10 - Grigorovich
  - I-11 - Polikarpov
  - I-12 - Tupolev ANT-23
  - I-13 - Polikarpov
  - I-14 - Tupolev ANT-31
  - I-15/I-15bis/I-153 - Polikarpov TsKB-3
  - I-16 - Polikarpov TsKB-12/18/29
  - I-17 - Polikarpov TsKB-15/19/33
  - I-18 - Polikarpov TsKB-43 (unbuilt)
  - I-19 - Polikarpov TsKB-25 (unbuilt)
  - I-20 - Tupolev ANT-47 (unbuilt)
  - I-21 - Ilyushin
  - I-21 - Pashinin
  - I-22 - Lavochkin-Gorbunov-Gudkov LaGG-1
  - I-26 - Yakovlev Yak-1. '26' is from Yakovlev AIR series designations.
  - I-27 - Yakovlev Yak-7
  - I-28 - Yatsenko
  - I-29 - Yakovlev Yak-2
  - I-30 - Yakovlev Yak-1
  - I-31 - Yakovlev, dive-bomber based on the BB-22
  - I-33 - Yakovlev Yak-3
- IP (ИП) - Istrebitel Pushetchnii (cannon fighter)
  - IP-1 - Grigorovich
  - IP-2 - Grigorovich
  - IP-3 - Zaslawsky & Bas-Dubov (project)
  - IP-4 - Grigorovich
  - IP-21 - Pashinin
- IS (ИС) - Istrebitel Skladnoi (folding fighter)
  - IS-1 & IS-2 - Nikitin
- K (K) - Korablennyi (shipborne) (Generic designation - not used for specific types)
- KR (KР) - Korabelnii Razvedchik (shipboard reconnaissance)
  - KR-1 - Heinkel HD 55
  - KR-2 - Beriev Be-2/KOR-1
- KR (KР) - KReiser (cruiser = heavy long-range fighter)
  - KR-6 - Tupolev ANT-7/R-6 on floats
- KOR (KOР) - Korabelnii O Razvedchik – (shipboard catapult reconnaissance)
  - KOR-1 - Beriev Be-2
  - KOR-2 - Beriev Be-4
  - KOR-3 - Beriev Be-5, not built
- LBSh (ЛБШ) - Lyogki Bronirovannyi Shturmovik (light armoured-attack)
  - LBSh - Kochyerigin
- LK (ЛК) - Lyogki Kreiser (light cruiser)
  - LK-1 - Grigorovich
  - LK-2 - Grokhovsky
  - LK-3 - Grigorovich
- M (М) - Morskoi (marine = seaplane) (Generic designation - not used for specific types)
- MBR (МБР) - Morskoi Blizhnii Razvedchik (short-range reconnaissance seaplane)
  - MBR-1 - Bartini project
  - MBR-2 - Beriev MP-1
  - MBR-3 - Samsonov
  - MBR-4 - Savoia-Marchetti SM.62bis
  - MBR-5 - Samsonov
  - MBR-7 - Beriev MS-8
- MDR (МДР) - Morskoi Dalnii Razvedchik (long-range reconnaissance seaplane)
  - MDR-1 - Grigorovich ROM-2
  - MDR-2 - Tupolev ANT-8
  - MDR-3 - Chyetverikov TsKB-11
  - MDR-4 - Tupolev ANT-27, later MTB-1
  - MDR-5 - Beriev MS-5
  - MDR-6 - Chyetverikov Che-2
  - MDR-7 - Shavrov
  - MDR-8 - Shavrov
  - MDR-10 - Beriev
- MDRT (МДРТ) - Morskoi Dalnii Razvedchik Torpedonosets (long-range reconnaissance seaplane torpedo bomber)
  - MDRT - Beriev
- MI (МИ) - Mnogomestnii Istrebitel (multi-seat fighter)
  - MI-3 - Tupolev ANT-21
  - MI-4 - Tupolev ANT-34
- MP (МП) - Morskoi Passazhirskiy (passenger seaplane)
  - MP-1 - Beriev MBR-2
  - MP-2 - Chyetverikov ARK-3
  - MP-6 - Tupolev ANT-7
- MR (МР) - Morskoi Razvedchik (reconnaissance seaplane)
  - MR-1 - Polikarpov R-1 on floats
  - MR-2 - Grigorovich
  - MR-3 - OMOS
  - MR-3 - Grigorovich
  - MR-5 - Grigorovich
  - MR-5 - Polikarpov R-5 on floats
  - MR-6 - Tupolev ANT-7
- MTB (МТБ) - Morskoi Torpedonosyets Bombardirovshchik (naval torpedo bomber)
  - MTB-1 - Tupolev ANT-27
  - MTB-2 - Tupolev ANT-44
- MU (МУ) - Morskoi Uchebny (seaplane trainer)
  - MU-1 - Avro 504
  - MU-2 - Polikarpov U-2M
  - MU-3 - Moskaleyev
  - MU-4 - Nikitin
  - MU-5 - Mikhelson (project)
- P (П) - Perekhodny (transitional trainer)
  - P-2 - Polikarpov
  - P-3 - Bedunkovich
- PS (ПС) - Passazhirskii Samolyot (passenger aircraft or airliner)
  - PS-3 - Tupolev R-3
  - PS-3 - Junkers W 33
  - PS-4 - Junkers W 33
  - PS-5 - Nyeman/Kharkov R-10
  - PS-7 - Tupolev ANT-7
  - PS-9 - Tupolev ANT-9
  - PS-30 - Martin 156
  - PS-35 - Tupolev ANT-35
  - PS-40 - Tupolev SB
  - PS-41 - Tupolev SB
  - PS-42 - Petlyakov Pe-8
  - PS-43 - Vultee V-11
  - PS-84 - Lisunov Li-2/Douglas DC-3
  - PS-89 - Laville ZIG-1
  - PS-124 - Tupolev ANT-20bis
- R (Р) - Razvedchik (Reconnaissance)
  - R-Z - Polikarpov
  - R-1 - Polikarpov
  - R-2 - Polikarpov
  - R-3 - Tupolev ANT-3
  - R-4 - Tupolev (prototype only)
  - R-5 - Polikarpov
  - R-6 - Tupolev ANT-7
  - R-7 - Tupolev ANT-10 (prototype only)
  - R-9 - Kochyerigin R-9/SR-9
  - R-10 - Neman/KhAI
  - R-12 - Yakovlev (prototype only)
- RD (РД) - Rekord Dalnost – (long range record aircraft)
  - RD - Tupolev ANT-25
- ROM (РOМ) - Razvedchik Otkrytogo Morya (reconnaissance open sea)
  - ROM-1 - Grigorovich
  - ROM-2 - Grigorovich
- SB (СБ) - Skorostnoi Bombardirovshchik (high-speed bomber)
  - SB: Tupolev ANT-40
- ShB (ШБ) - Shturmovoi Bombardirovshchik (attack bomber)
  - ShB: Sukhoi Su-2
- SPB (СПБ) - Skorostnoi Pikiruyuschii Bombardirovshchik (high-speed dive bomber)
  - SPB - Polikarpov I-16 variant used with Zveno project
- SPL (СПЛ) - Samolyet dlya Podvodnikh Lodok (aeroplane for submarines)
  - SPL - Chyetverikov
- SS (СС) - Stratosfernii Samolyot (stratospheric aircraft)
  - SS - Chizhevski BOK-1
- T (Т) - Torpedonosets (Torpedo bomber)
  - T-1 - Tupolev ANT-41
- TB (ТБ) - Tiazholyi Bombardirovshchik (heavy bomber)
  - TB-1 - Tupolev ANT-4
  - TB-2 - Polikarpov (prototype only)
  - TB-3 - Tupolev ANT-6
  - TB-4 - Tupolev ANT-16
  - TB-5 - Grigorovich
  - TB-6 - Tupolev ANT-26
  - TB-7 - Tupolev ANT-42 (redesignated Pe-8)
- TSh (ТШ) - Tiazholyi Shturmovik (heavy ground attack aircraft)
  - TSh-1 - Grigorovich (modified Polikarpov R-5)
  - TSh-2 - Grigorovich (modified Polikarpov R-5)
  - TSh-3 - Kocherigin TsKB-4
- U (У) - Uchebny (trainer)
  - U-1 - Avro 504
  - U-2 - Polikarpov U-2/Po-2
  - U-3 - Polikarpov Po-2
  - U-3 - Mikhelson (duplicated designation)
  - U-4 - Polikarpov
  - U-5 - Nikitin NV-5
- UPB (УПБ) - Uchyebno Perekhodnoi Bombardirovshchik (training transitional bomber)
  - UPB - Kazan KAI-3
- UT (УТ) - Uchebno-Trenirivochnyi (advanced trainer)
  - UT-1 - Yakovlev UT-1
  - UT-2 - Yakovlev UT-2
  - UT-3 - Yakovlev UT-3
- UTI (УТИ) - Uchebno-Trenirivochnyi Istrebitel (advanced fighter trainer)
  - UTI-1 - Polikarpov I-15 as fighter trainer
  - UTI-2 - Polikarpov I-16 as fighter trainer
  - UTI-3 - Polikarpov I-16 as fighter trainer
  - UTI-4 - Polikarpov I-16UTI fighter trainer
  - UTI-5 - Nikitin NV-2
  - UTI-6 - Nikitin NV-4
  - UTI-26 - Yakovlev Yak-7
- VIT (ВИТ) - Vozdushnyi Istrebitel Tankov (air tank destroyer)
  - VIT-1 - Polikarpov
  - VIT-2 - Polikarpov

== Soviet system after December 9, 1940 ==
The system after December 9, 1940 (in accordance with order No 704) used letter abbreviations for the design office, then sequential numbers, sometimes with odd numbers for fighters (e.g. Yak-3, MiG-15, Su-27...) and even numbers for other types (e.g. Il-2, Tu-16, Su-34, Tu-154...). However, this latter rule was not always applied, especially for helicopters.

Contrary to western sources, official Soviet designations did not include constructors' names (e.g. Yakovlev Yak-1), only abbreviations (i.e. Yak-1) however initially full names like Yakovlev-1 were occasionally used. Numerical designations were assigned individually for each developer to aircraft when they entered service. Aircraft also frequently had development designations used within design bureaus, like aircraft 105, or ANT-105 that led to the Tu-22, or T-6 for Su-24, and an industry production name assigned to the facility where production was undertaken.

The NATO Air Standardization Coordinating Committee reporting name system (used because designations of new types were often unknown to NATO) was based on an initial letter indicating type of aircraft (B = bomber, C = cargo, F = fighter, H = helicopter, M = miscellaneous or missile,) and 1 syllable if propeller-driven or 2 if jet- or rocket-powered.

== Design office prefixes ==
An (Ан): Antonov
Ar (Ар): Archangelski
BI (БИ): Berezniak-Isaev
Be (Бе): Beriev
Che (Че): Chetverikov
Gu (Гу): Gudkov
Il (Ил): Ilyushin
K (К): Kalinin
Ka (Ка): Kamov
KhAI (ХАИ): Kharkov Aviation Institute
La (Ла): Lavochkin
LaG (ЛаГ): Lavochkin-Gorbunov
LaGG (ЛаГГ): Lavochkin-Gorbunov-Gudkov
Li (Ли): Lisunov
M (М): Myasishchev
Mi (Ми): Mil
MiG (МиГ): Mikoyan-Gurevich, until the death of Artem Mikoyan in 1970, then just Mikoyan
Pe (Пе): Petlyakov
Po (По): Polikarpov
Su (Су): Sukhoi
Sh (Ш): Shavrov, Sheremetev
Shche (Ще): Shcherbakov
Ta (Та): Tairov
Ts (Ц): Tsybin
Tu (Ту): Tupolev (bureau designation was ANT)
Yak (Як): Yakovlev (bureau designation was AIR)
Yer (Ер): Yermolayev

== See also ==
- List of military aircraft of the Soviet Union and the CIS
