= Tupolev ANT-17 =

Type of aircraft

The Tupolev ANT-17 (aka TSh-B, TSh-1) was a late 1920s design by the Tupolev Design Bureau for a ground-attack aircraft.

== Design and development ==
In the late 1920s, armies underwent a worldwide trend towards mechanization in the form of tanks and light armored vehicles. This development demanded a new type of combat aircraft able to take on armored vehicles utilized by ground forces.

In 1929, the Tupolev OKB undertook design of an unconventional aircraft with maximum offensive armament and armor protection. The ANT-17 was a four-seat biplane armed with a recoilless gun designed by Leonid Kurchevskiy, 8 machine guns, and over 3,000 pounds (1,400 kg) of bombs. The ANT-17 would have featured over 2,000 pounds (910 kg) of armor. Unfortunately, the weight of the armor meant that Tupolev doubted the ability of the ANT-17 to deliver the required performance, so the ANT-17 project was cancelled.
