= Tupolev ANT-22 =

ANT-22 (MK-1)
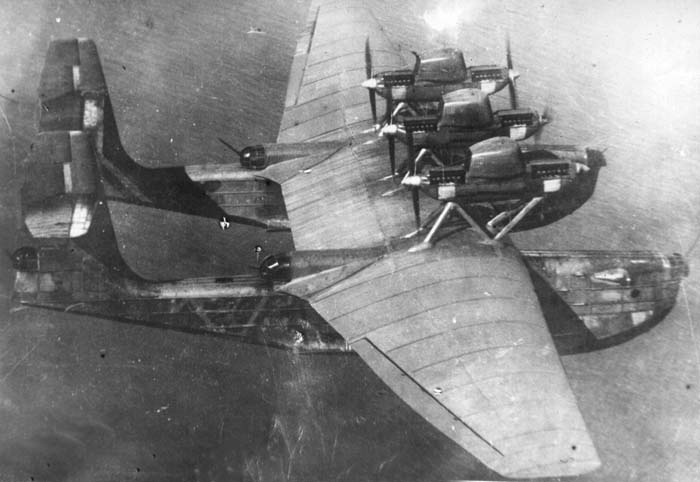

General information
- Type: Reconnaissance flying boat
- Manufacturer: Tupolev
- Number built: 1

History
- First flight: 8 August 1934

The Tupolev ANT-22 (also known as the MK-1) was a large flying boat built in the Soviet Union in 1934. A huge aircraft consisting of two hulls and powered by six engines in three nacelles in a push-pull configuration, it was based on the ANT-11, which was never built. Its enormous weight severely crippled its performance, and it never proceeded beyond the experimental stage.

== Operators ==
Soviet Union

- Soviet Naval Aviation

== Specifications (ANT-22) ==
Data from The Osprey Encyclopedia of Russian Aircraft 1875–1995

General characteristics

- Crew: eight
- Length: 24.1 m (79 ft 0.75 in)
- Wingspan: 51.0 m (167 ft 3.88 in)
- Height: 8.96 m (29 ft 4.67 in)
- Wing area: 304.5 m^{2} (3,278 sq ft)
- Empty weight: 21,663 kg (47,758 lb)
- Gross weight: 33,560 kg (73,986 lb)
- Powerplant: 6 × Mikulin M-34R , 612 kW (820 hp) each

Performance

- Maximum speed: 233 km/h (145 mph, 126 kn)
- Cruise speed: 180 km/h (112 mph, 97 kn)
- Range: 1,350 km (840 mi, 730 nmi)
- Endurance: 7 hours
- Service ceiling: 3,500 m (11,500 ft)
- Rate of climb: 1.6 m/s (318 ft/min)

Armament

- 2 × 20 mm Oerlikon cannon (one in left dorsal turret and one in right nose turret)
- 2 × 7.62×54mmR ShKAS machine gun (one in right dorsal turret and one in left nose turret)
- 2 × 7.62×54mmR DA machine guns (one in each tail turret)
- 6,000 kg (13,200 lb) bombs under wing centre section
