= Tupolev Tu-130 =

Concept of a nuclear missile

Tu-130 (Russian: Ту-130) was a concept for a boost-glider launched by an intercontinental three-stage missile by Soviet designer Tupolev.

== Development history ==
From 1957, work began on the creation of a drone unmanned aircraft "DP" (дальний планирующий, Dal'niy planiruyushchiy - long-range glider) in the Tupolev Design Bureau. It was the last stage of a strategic rocket. It was supposed to use medium-range ballistic missiles (R-5, R-12) as carriers. In addition, the option of using a proprietary booster was considered.

The launch vehicle would raise the DP to an altitude of 80–100 km, after which it would be separated from the carrier and transferred to the flight planner. Then the trajectory was corrected. The target could be at a distance of 4,000 km, and the speed of the DP reached Mach 10. The trajectory was corrected by aerodynamic control surfaces. The power plant on board was missing. Chemical power sources and compressed air cylinders were used to power on-board equipment . For cooling equipment and thermonuclear charge was used onboard cooling system. The airframe design did not provide for a cooling system, so all the stresses that should have arisen during the flight should have been taken into account in the design. At the final stage of the flight, the device was put into a dive towards the target and, upon a signal from the altimeter, the warhead was detonated.

The advantage of this design to the first generation of strategic missiles was higher accuracy with a simpler targeting system and the provision of a complex flight path to the target, which made it difficult for the anti-missile and anti-aircraft defense systems to operate.

For the implementation of the project, two years of intensive work were carried out, new materials and technologies were developed, the problems of aerodynamics were investigated, and field models were created and studied. Several experimental aircraft were built to test the main ideas. The project work program was named Tu-130.

Various aerodynamic schemes were investigated: symmetric, asymmetrical, tailless, canard and others. A series of models were built that were tested in the Central Aerohydrodynamic Institute wind tunnels, including at supersonic speeds. At the Gromov Flight Research Institute, tests were carried out on which models of DP with solid fuel-boosters were dropped from the Tupolev Tu-16 LL. Models were also fired by artillery guns and gas-dynamic guns. During the tests, speeds of up to 6 M were achieved.

In 1959, the design of the DP began. The aerodynamic configuration of a tailless aircraft was chosen. The wedge-shaped fuselage had a semi-elliptical cross-section with a blunt nose. The low-mounted delta wing was small in area with a sweepback of 75° along the leading edge and elevons along the entire span. The vertical tail consisted of upper and lower vertical stabilizers in the rear part of the fuselage. Brake flaps were installed on both halves of the vertical stabilizer. The wing and controls had a wedge-shaped profile. Due to aerodynamic heating, the nose of the aircraft and the leading edges of the lifting and control surfaces were made of graphite. The airframe was made of stainless steel.

A series of five experimental aircraft was planned. In 1960, the first aircraft was manufactured. However, despite the successes of the design bureau, the work was terminated by a Resolution of the Council of Ministers of the Soviet Union. The already-built aircraft were either recycled, or transferred to the Vladimir Chelomey design bureau. The research and design materials developed during the work were used in the next work of the Tupolev design bureau - the Zvezda manned rocket plane.

Work on the project continued only about a year before it was abandoned in favor of the more conventional Tu-123 supersonic cruise missile.
