= Tupolev ANT-41 =

Prototype Soviet torpedo-bomber

ANT-41

General information
- Type: Torpedo-bomber
- National origin: Soviet Union
- Manufacturer: Tupolev
- Designer: Vladimir Myasishchev
- Number built: 1

History
- First flight: 2 June 1936

The Tupolev ANT-41 was a prototype Soviet twin-engined torpedo-bomber of the 1930s. A single prototype was built, which was destroyed in a crash. No production followed, with the Ilyushin DB-3 serving as a torpedo bomber instead.

== Design and development ==
In March 1934, the Tupolev design bureau (OKB) began work on a multi-role aircraft for Soviet Naval Aviation, intended to serve as a high-speed, long-range torpedo bomber, reconnaissance aircraft and "cruiser" (i.e. long-range heavy fighter), and available in both landplane and floatplane versions. (Note: The Tupolev ANT-7 served in similar roles, but by 1934 was becoming obsolete.) The task of designing the new aircraft, given the OKB designation ANT-41 and the Navy designation T-1 (Torpedonosets – i.e. torpedo carrier) was assigned to the team led by Vladimir Myasishchev.

The ANT-41 was of similar layout to the contemporary SB bomber, which had been designed by another team (led by Alexander Arkhangelsky) at the Tupolev OKB, but was larger and more powerful. Like the SB, it was a mid-winged cantilever monoplane of all-metal stressed skin construction. It was powered by two Mikulin AM-34 liquid-cooled V12 engines in close-fitting cowlings driving 3-bladed propellers and cooled by radiators mounted inside the wings inboard of the engines, which were fed by narrow ducts on the leading edge of the wing. A long (6.5 m (21 ft 4 in)) weapons bay under the fuselage could hold two 880 kilograms (1,940 lb) torpedoes, or a single 1,700 kilograms (3,700 lb) torpedo or an equivalent weight in bombs. The undercarriage of the landplane version was a retractable tailwheel undercarriage, based on that of the SB but strengthened to deal with the ANT-41's greater weight.

== History ==
The first prototype ANT-41, a landplane, made its maiden flight from Khodynka Aerodrome, Moscow on 2 June 1936, with severe tail flutter encountered. (Note: Similar tail flutter had been encountered during prototype testing of the SB, and had caused the prototype Tupolev DB-2 long-range bomber to crash the previous year.) It was destroyed in a crash during the 14th test flight on 3 July 1936, with the test crew escaping by parachute. The accident was caused by flutter causing wing failure, which was traced to inadequate aileron design. Later that year, the Ilyushin DB-3 was chosen to meet Soviet Naval Aviation's requirements for a torpedo bomber, and the ANT-41 was cancelled, with the second prototype unbuilt.

== Specifications ==
Data from Tupolev: The Man and His Aircraft

General characteristics

- Crew: 4
- Length: 15.54 m (51 ft 0 in)
- Wingspan: 25.73 m (84 ft 5 in)
- Height: 3.86 m (12 ft 8 in)
- Wing area: 88.94 m^{2} (957.3 sq ft)
- Empty weight: 5,846 kg (12,888 lb)
- Gross weight: 8,925 kg (19,676 lb)
- Powerplant: 2 × Mikulin AM-34 FRNV liquid-cooled V-12 engines, 951 kW (1,275 hp) each

Performance

- Maximum speed: 435 km/h (270 mph, 235 kn)
- Range: 4,200 km (2,600 mi, 2,300 nmi)
- Service ceiling: 9,500 m (31,200 ft)

Armament

- Guns: 2 × 12.7 mm ShVAK machine guns and 1 × 20 mm ShVAK cannon
- Bombs: 2× torpedoes or 2,000 kg (4,400 lb) of bombs
