= Tupolev MTB-2 =

Soviet flying boat

MTB-2 (ANT-44)

General information
- Type: Flying boat/Amphibian
- National origin: Soviet Union
- Manufacturer: Tupolev
- Status: Cancelled
- Primary user: Soviet Union
- Number built: 2

History
- First flight: 19 April 1937

The Tupolev MTB-2 (Морской Тяжелый Бомбардировщик — Heavy Naval Bomber), also known as the ANT-44, was a Soviet four-engine flying boat built in the late 1930s. Two prototypes were built; performance was satisfactory, but the design was overtaken by the fielding of long-range, land-based bombers by Soviet Naval Aviation and cancelled in 1940.

The first prototype crashed during flight testing and the second aircraft set a series of world records by a flying boat later that year. After the Axis invasion of the Soviet Union in June 1941, it flew bombing missions against targets in Romania and then along the Black Sea littoral as Axis troops advanced deeper into the Soviet Union. In 1942 the aircraft began evacuating wounded troops and also resumed its previous role of strategic bombing Romanian targets until its loss later that year.

== Design and development ==
By the early 1930s Soviet Naval Aviation was aware that their existing long-range seaplanes were obsolescent. Unsure if Soviet designers could design and build modern aircraft in a timely manner, they considered ordering such aircraft from abroad. The British seaplane specialists, Short Brothers, offered a four-engined variant of their S.23 flying boat to be built in the Soviet Union in late 1934. It would have a top speed of 300–320 km/h (190–200 mph) and a range of 1,200–1,300 km (750–810 mi). The Central Aerohydrodynamic Institute evaluated the submission and concluded that the Tupolev Design Bureau could do better.

The requirements for the ANT-44 (factory designation) or MTB-2 flying boat were issued in March 1935 for an aircraft able to attack land and naval targets that could also transport 35–40 people and cargo. The aircraft had to be capable of 300 km/h at an altitude of 1,000 m (3,300 ft) and a range of 1,000 km (620 mi) with a 2,000 kg (4,400 lb) bomb load. Tupolev designed an all-metal aircraft that used a shoulder-mounted gull wing. It had a two-step planing hull divided into seven watertight compartments for its crew of seven or eight men. The aircraft was armed with 7.62 mm (0.30 in) ShKAS machine guns in nose and tail turrets; the third weapon was positioned in the upper dorsal compartment with a sliding hatch. It could carry up to 2,500 kg (5,500 lb) of bombs or naval mines in external racks beneath the wing center section. Its fuel was carried in metal tanks on each side of the forward wing spar. The ANT-44 was fitted with four 604 kW (810 hp) Gnome-Rhône Mistral Major 14Kdrs M-85 radial engines. On each side of each engine, the leading edge of the wing could folded down to be used as a work platform. The tailplane was braced by wires on top and bottom.

The aircraft made its first flight on 19 April 1937 from dry land using a temporary fixed undercarriage; its first water-borne flight was not until 1 November after its underwing stabilizing floats had been installed. State trials began that month, but were interrupted the following month to exchange the Mistral Major engines for the more powerful Tumansky M-87 627 kW (840 hp) engines. The armament was also upgraded to 20 mm (0.79 in) ShVAK cannon in the nose and tail turrets, the dorsal position was replaced by a turret with a ShKAS and another ShKAS was added in the hull. After the trials resumed in July 1938, the prototype was further modified with retractable conventional landing gear and improved 709 kW (950 hp) M-87A engines. The ANT-44 began the second stage of its state trials in late September, but sank after a heavy landing that ruptured its hull on the night of 27/28 February 1939.

The second prototype, designated ANT-44bis or ANT-44D, began construction in July 1937 and incorporated most of the changes requested when the mockup was inspected in March as were those made to the first aircraft, including the M-87A engines, the addition of landing gear and the modified armament. The wing was slightly enlarged, the empennage size and shape was revised, as was the bracing for the tailplane. It made its first flight on 26 June 1938 and the builder's trials continued until 27 March 1939. State trials were conducted on 1–16 May and ended with a positive recommendation.

Construction was scheduled to begin at Factory No. 30 at Moscow-Khodynka. The production aircraft was intended to use 820 kW (1,100 hp) Tumansky M-88 radials, have a top speed of 400 km/h (250 mph) and a range of 2,000 km (1,200 mi) with a 2,800 kg (6,200 lb) bomb load. Production was cancelled in January 1940 as the Navy was beginning to receive Ilyushin DB-3 long-range bombers that could fulfill the MTB-2's role more cheaply.

With the landing gear removed, Tupolev used the ANT-44bis to set several world records for aircraft of its type and size:

- 17 June 1940: altitude of 7,595 m (24,918 ft) without payload
- 17 June 1940: altitude of 7,134 m (23,406 ft) with a 1,000 kg (2,205 lb) payload
- 19 June 1940: altitude of 6,284 m (20,617 ft) with a 2,000 kg (4,409 lb) payload
- 19 June 1940: altitude of 5,219 m (17,123 ft) with a 5,000 kg (11,023 lb) payload
- 28 September 1940: maximum speed of 277.4 km/h (150 kn, 172 mph) over 1,000 km (540 nmi, 621 mi) with a 1,000 kg (2,205 lb) payload
- 7 October 1940: maximum speed of 241.9 km/h (131 kn, 150 mph) over 1,000 km (540 nmi, 621 mi) with a 2,000 kg (4,409 lb) payload

== Operational history ==
After the Axis invasion of the Soviet Union on 22 June 1941, the ANT-44bis had its landing gear removed to increase its bombload (it could carry up to 7,000 kg (15,000 lb) during short-range missions) and was initially used to attack the Romanian cities of Bucharest, Constanța and Ploiești at night. As Axis troops advanced along the Black Sea coast, the aircraft began bombing troop positions at night around Odessa, Kherson and Nikolaev. The encirclement of Sevastopol in late 1941 forced the ANT-44bis to rebase at Gelendzhik in the North Caucasus region and it began to evacuate wounded from the city while also resuming its strategic bombing of Romanian targets. For these latter missions, the flying boat was usually escorted by fighters, but one day in mid-1942 there was a failure of coordination and the fighters were not present when the ANT-44bis began taking off. The overloaded aircraft was discovered by marauding German fighters and was easily shot down with the loss of all its crew except for the pilot who was ejected from the flying boat as it exploded. Unwilling to admit that a mistake had been made, the Soviet leadership claimed that a wing touching the water caused a crash due to pilot error and transferred the inconvenient witnesses to the Northern Fleet in the Arctic.

== Specifications (ANT-44D) ==
Data from Tupolev Aircraft since 1922; ANT-44, la mouette de Tupolev

General characteristics

- Crew: 7–8
- Length: 22.42 m (73 ft 7 in)
- Wingspan: 36.45 m (119 ft 7 in)
- Wing area: 146.7 m^{2} (1,579 sq ft)
- Empty weight: 13,000 kg (28,660 lb)
- Gross weight: 19,000 kg (41,888 lb)
- Max takeoff weight: 22,000 kg (48,502 lb)
- Powerplant: 4 × Tumansky M-87A 9-cylinder air-cooled radial engines, 710 kW (950 hp) each
- Propellers: 3-bladed variable-pitch propellers, 3.5 m (11 ft 6 in) diameter

Performance

- Maximum speed: 355 km/h (221 mph, 192 kn)
- Cruise speed: 240–250 km/h (150–160 mph, 130–130 kn)
- Endurance: 14 hours
- Service ceiling: 7,100 m (23,300 ft)
- Time to altitude: 3 minutes to 1,000 m (3,300 ft)
  18 minutes to 5,000 m (16,000 ft)

Armament

- Guns: 2 × 20 mm ShVAK autocannon, 2 × 7.62 mm ShKAS machine guns
- Bombs: 2000 kg

== See also ==
Related development

- Tupolev MTB-1

Aircraft of comparable role, configuration, and era

- Blohm und Voss BV 222
- Boeing 314
- Kawanishi H8K
- Martin PBM Mariner
- Short Sunderland
