= Turbay =

Turbay is a surname. Notable people with the surname include:

- Claudia Turbay Quintero (born 1952), Colombian journalist and diplomat
- Diana Turbay (1950–1991), Colombian journalist
- Gabriel Turbay (1901–1947), Colombian diplomat and politician
- Julio César Turbay Ayala (1916–2005), former president of Colombia
- Julio César Turbay Quintero (born 1949), Colombian politician
- Miguel Uribe Turbay (1986–2025), Colombian politician
- Nydia Quintero Turbay (1932–2025), former First Lady of Colombia
- Paola Turbay (born 1970), Colombian-American actress
