= Tupolev Tu-324 =

Proposed airliner by Tupolev

Tupolev Tu-324 / Tu-414
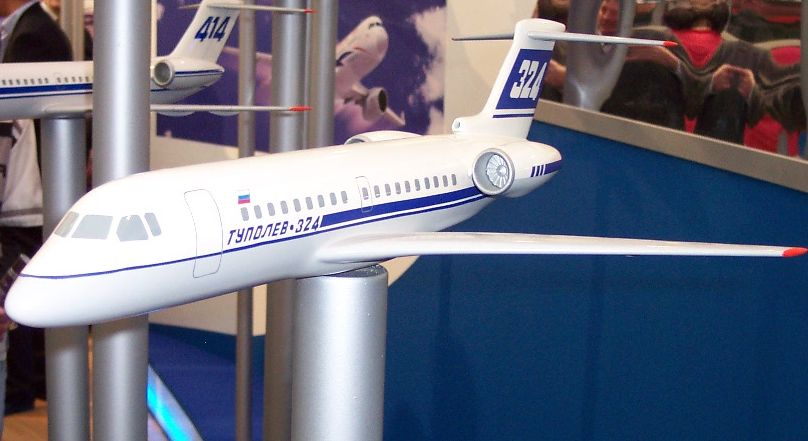
- Tu-324 model

General information
- Type: Jet airliner
- Manufacturer: Tupolev
- Status: In development, may be cancelled due to lack of funds.
- Primary users: None None
- Number built: 0

History
- Developed from: Tupolev Tu-134

The Tupolev Tu-324 is a 30–50 seat regional jet passenger airliner. The jet will be twin-powered by Ivchenko-Progress AI-22 or Rolls-Royce BR710 turbofan engines. The plane will be available as a corporate plane for eight–ten executives. The range for the three aircraft variants will be 2,500 km, 5,000 km and 7,000 km. The cargo version can carry 3,000 kg of cargo and a range of 5,900 km is expected. The Tu-324 is designed to replace aging Yakovlev Yak-40, Tupolev Tu-134, and Antonov An-24 and An-26s on Russian regional routes.

== Production ==
The executive version would be equipped with a satellite phone, FAX, and a PC outlet. The Tupolev Tu-324 would be able to operate from gravel and dirt airfields, providing safety and comfort of the passengers. The Tupolev Tu-324 would be produced at the S.P.Gorbunov Aircraft Production Association in Kazan, Russia. Estimated price is between $19–23 Million USD.

As of 2015, despite politicians of the Tatarstan region fighting for the project, little progress was made as United Aircraft Corporation focused on fostering the Sukhoi Superjet, Antonov An-148 and Irkut MC-21 programs. In 2016, manufacturing of the TU-324 was proposed among similar projects, but United Aircraft Corporation decided to restart production of the Ilyushin Il-114 instead.

== Variants ==
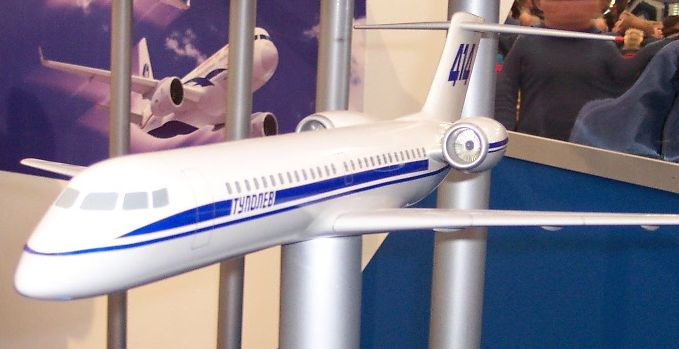
Tu-414 model

Tu-324
Tu-414

== Specifications (proposed) ==
Data from

General characteristics

- Crew: 2
- Capacity: 30–50 passengers
- Length: 26.2 m (85 ft 11 in)
- Wingspan: 23.7 m (77 ft 9 in)
- Height: 7.3 m (23 ft 11 in)
- Gross weight: 24,630 kg (54,300 lb)
- Powerplant: 2 × Ivchenko-Progress AI-22 or Rolls-Royce BR710 or Soyuz R126M-300 turbofan engines

Performance

- Cruise speed: 800 km/h (500 mph, 430 kn)
- Range: 4,500 km (2,800 mi, 2,400 nmi)

== See also ==
- Yak-40
- Tupolev Tu-134
