= Tupolev I-8 =

I-8 (ANT-13)

General information
- Type: Fighter
- National origin: Soviet Union
- Manufacturer: Tupolev
- Status: Retired
- Number built: 1

History
- First flight: 1930

The Tupolev I-8 (also known as the ANT-13) was an experimental interceptor built in the Soviet Union in the early 1930s.

== Design and development ==
The I-8 was the first Soviet aircraft to exceed 300 km/h (190 mph; 160 kn) in level flight. The aircraft was an exercise in developing the Polikarpov I-5 design by a group of engineers led by V. M. Rodionov, each of whom volunteered 70 hours of personal time to the project.

The I-8 first flew on 28 October 1930 with M. M. Gromov at the controls. Despite promising performance, the aircraft did not advance beyond prototype phase because there were no plans to acquire the Curtiss V-1570 engine, and no domestic equivalent was available.

== Specifications (I-8) ==
Data from Istoriia konstruktskii samoletov v SSSR do 1938 g. (3 izd.), The Osprey Encyclopedia of Russian Aircraft 1975–1995, The Complete Book of Fighters

General characteristics

- Crew: 1
- Length: 6.7 m (22 ft 0 in)
- Wingspan: 9.03 m (29 ft 8 in)
- Wing area: 20.3 m^{2} (219 sq ft)
- Empty weight: 960 kg (2,116 lb)
- Gross weight: 1,424 kg (3,139 lb)
- Powerplant: 1 × Curtiss V-1570 Conqueror V-12 liquid-cooled piston engine, 466 kW (625 hp)
- Propellers: 2-bladed fixed-pitch propeller

Performance

- Maximum speed: 303 km/h (188 mph, 164 kn) at sea level

313 km/h (194 mph; 169 kn) at 3,600 m (11,800 ft)

- Landing speed: 118 km/h (73 mph; 64 kn)
- Range: 440 km (270 mi, 240 nmi)
- Endurance: 1 hour 48 minutes
- Service ceiling: 8,500 m (27,900 ft)
- Time to altitude: 1,000 m (3,300 ft) in 1 minute

5,000 m (16,000 ft) in 6 minutes 42 seconds

- Wing loading: 71 kg/m^{2} (15 lb/sq ft)
- Power/mass: 0.327 kW/kg (0.199 hp/lb)

Armament

- Guns: 2 × 7.62 mm (0.3 in) PV-1 machine guns
