= Tupolev ANT-35 =

1936 Soviet airliner

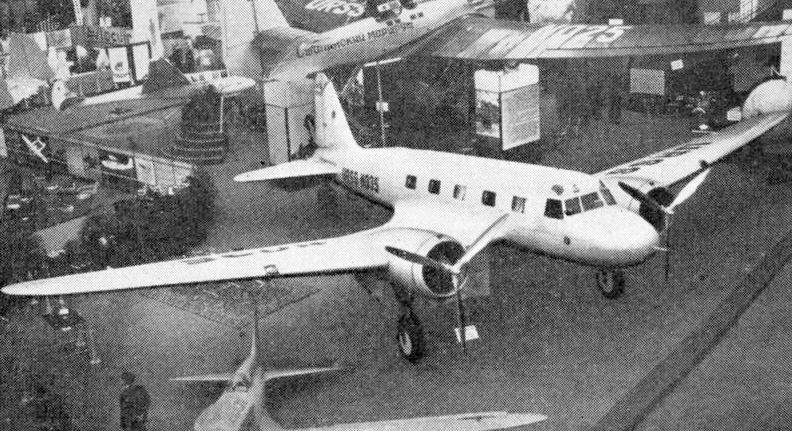

General information
- Type: Airliner
- National origin: Soviet Union
- Manufacturer: Tupolev
- Primary user: Aeroflot
- Number built: 11

History
- First flight: 1936
- Developed from: Tupolev SB

The Tupolev ANT-35 was a 1930s Soviet twin-engined light transport monoplane that entered service with Aeroflot in 1937 as the Tupolev PS-35.

== Development ==
In 1935, Andrei Tupolev ordered a design team led by Alexander Arkhangelsky to start work on a high-speed passenger aircraft based on the ANT-40 (later known as the SB) bomber which had first flown in October 1934. The new transport, the ANT-35, had a new fuselage but the aircraft's wings, tail and undercarriage were closely based on those of the ANT-40. It was a twin-engined all-metal low-wing monoplane with conventional landing gear with retractable mainwheels. The aircraft had a crew of two pilots, who sat in an enclosed flight deck, while the cabin had seats for 10 passengers. The first prototype, powered by two 600 kW (800 hp) Gnome-Rhone 14K radial engines, made its maiden flight on 20 August 1936. Initial testing was successful, and in November that year it was exhibited at that year's Paris Air Show.

The ANT-35's cabin, with a headroom of only 1.68 m (5 ft 6 in), and further constricted by having the wing spars pass through it, was very cramped, and the second prototype, designated the ANT-35bis, had the fuselage height increased by 0.15 m (5.9 in), greatly improving space for the passengers, while two 750 kW (1,000 hp) Wright Cyclone G2 engines were fitted. The ANT-35bis was completed in June 1937, and the type was put into production at Factory No 22 in Moscow, with production aircraft powered by Cyclones or the Soviet licence-built derivative, the Shvetsov M-62IR, with deliveries starting in 1938. By 1939, Soviet factories had begun license-building the Douglas DC-3 airliner, which used the same engines but could carry twice the passengers over a greater range and production of the ANT-35bis was stopped in 1939, with only nine aircraft (plus the two prototypes), completed.

== Operational history ==
The first prototype entered service with Aeroflot in July 1937, serving on the Moscow–Stockholm route and was joined by the second prototype as soon as it finished testing, with other international routes including services between Moscow and Prague. The final seven PS-35s joined the Ukrainian department of Aeroflot in 1939, operating flights from Kyiv to Moscow and Odesa.

Several PS-35s were destroyed by German bombers shortly after Germany invaded the Soviet Union on 22 June 1941, with the remaining aircraft joining the Kyiv Special Aviation Group, where they were employed to transport ammunition and medical supplies and for agent dropping behind the front lines. At least one PS-35 remained in use until 1944.

== Variants ==
ANT-35
Prototype with two 597 kW (800 hp) Gnome-Rhone 14K radial engines (later replaced with M-85s)
ANT-35bis
Production variant with two 746 kW (1,000 hp) Shvetsov M-62IR engines, one prototype and nine production aircraft.

== Operators ==
Soviet Union

- Aeroflot

== Specifications (ANT-35bis) ==

Data from Tupolev: The Man and His Aircraft

General characteristics

- Crew: Two
- Capacity: Ten (passengers)
- Length: 15.4 m (50 ft 6 in)
- Wingspan: 20.8 m (68 ft 3 in)
- Height: 5.66 m (18 ft 7 in)
- Wing area: 57.8 m^{2} (622 sq ft)
- Empty weight: 5,010 kg (11,045 lb)
- Max takeoff weight: 7,000 kg (15,432 lb)
- Powerplant: 2 × Shvetsov M-62IR , 750 kW (1,000 hp) each (take-off power)

Performance

- Cruise speed: 372 km/h (231 mph, 201 kn)
- Range: 1,200 km (750 mi, 650 nmi)
- Service ceiling: 7,200 m (23,600 ft)
- Time to altitude: 13 min to 5,000 m (16,000 ft)

== See also ==
Aircraft of comparable role, configuration, and era

- Boeing 247
- Douglas DC-2

Related lists

- List of aircraft of World War II
