= Tupolev TB-6 =

Soviet proposed bomber

TB-6/ANT-26/ANT-28
- Desktop model of Tupolev ANT-28

General information
- Type: Bomber
- National origin: Soviet Union
- Manufacturer: Tupolev
- Designer: Andrei Tupolev, Vladimir Petlyakov
- Primary user: Red Air Force (intended)
- Number built: 0

History
- Developed from: ANT-16

The Tupolev TB-6 (internal designation ANT-26; Russian: Туполев ТБ-6/АНТ-26) was a proposal by the Tupolev Design Bureau in the 1930s for a super-heavy bomber. Had it been built, it would have been the biggest-ever Soviet bomber and the largest aircraft by wingspan of its time, nine feet short of the 320 foot span of the Hughes H-4 Hercules, although the Scaled Composites Stratolaunch is now the biggest plane by wingspan.

== Development ==
While undertaking development of the Tupolev ANT-16 and ANT-20/PS-124, Tupolev began work in 1931 on an even larger bomber aircraft, powered by 12 engines and with a takeoff weight of 70,000 kg (150,000 lb). The resulting ANT-26 design was to have 12 Mikulin M-34FRN engines, eight on the leading edge of the wing and four in two tandem pairs above the wings. The tail empennage would have had three vertical stabilizers on the tailplane, the center vertical stabilizer taller than the others. An alternative TB-6 design featured a bomber aircraft with six Mikulin M-44 engines and a single rudder.

Given the sheer size of the TB-6, Tupolev decided to build a sub-scale aircraft to test the flight behavior of the TB-6. The subscale model flew in 1935, piloted by B.N. Koodrin. However, by the mid-1930s the trend in military aviation shifted towards smaller and faster aircraft and the TB-6 was cancelled, by which time the airframe was 75 percent complete and the entire aircraft 16 percent complete.

=== ANT-28 ===
In parallel with design of the ANT-26, the Tupolev Design bureau envisaged a vastly scaled-up ANT-20 with the same dimensions as the ANT-26 under the internal designation ANT-28 It was intended as an airliner and cargo plane with a maximum payload of 15,000 kg and a range of 1,500 km, and the arrangement of the engines was the same as for the TB-6. Like the TB-6, the ANT-28 never progressed past the drawing board.

== Specifications (TB-6 estimated) ==
Data from Istoriia konstruktskii samoletov v SSSR do 1938, The Osprey Encyclopaedia of Russian Aircraft 1875–1995.

General characteristics

- Crew: 17
- Length: 39 m (127 ft 11 in)
- Wingspan: 95 m (311 ft 8 in)
- Height: 10 m (32 ft 10 in)
- Wing area: 800 m^{2} (8,600 sq ft)
- Airfoil: modified TsAGI 6
- Empty weight: 50,000 kg (110,231 lb)
- Gross weight: 70,000 kg (154,324 lb)
- Max takeoff weight: 76,000 kg (167,551 lb)
- Powerplant: 12 × Mikulin AM-34FRN V-12 liquid-cooled piston engines (10 x tractor, 2 x pusher), 890 kW (1,200 hp) each

Performance

- Maximum speed: 300 km/h (190 mph, 160 kn)
- Range: 1,000 km (620 mi, 540 nmi) with 20,000 kg (44,000 lb) bomb load
  2,500 km (1,300 nmi; 1,600 mi) with 4,000 kg (8,800 lb) bomb load
- Power/mass: 0.115 kW/kg (0.07 hp/lb)

Armament

- Guns:
  - 1 x 37 mm (1.457 in) NS-37 cannon
  - 4 x 20 mm (0.787 in) ShVAK cannon
  - 1 x 7.62 mm (0.300 in) DA machine gun
  - 4 x 2 7.62 mm (0.300 in) ShKAS machine guns
- Bombs: 15,000 kg (33,000 lb) normal load, 24,600 kg (54,200 lb) max
