= Tupolev TB-1 =

Soviet bomber aircraft

TB-1 (ANT-4)
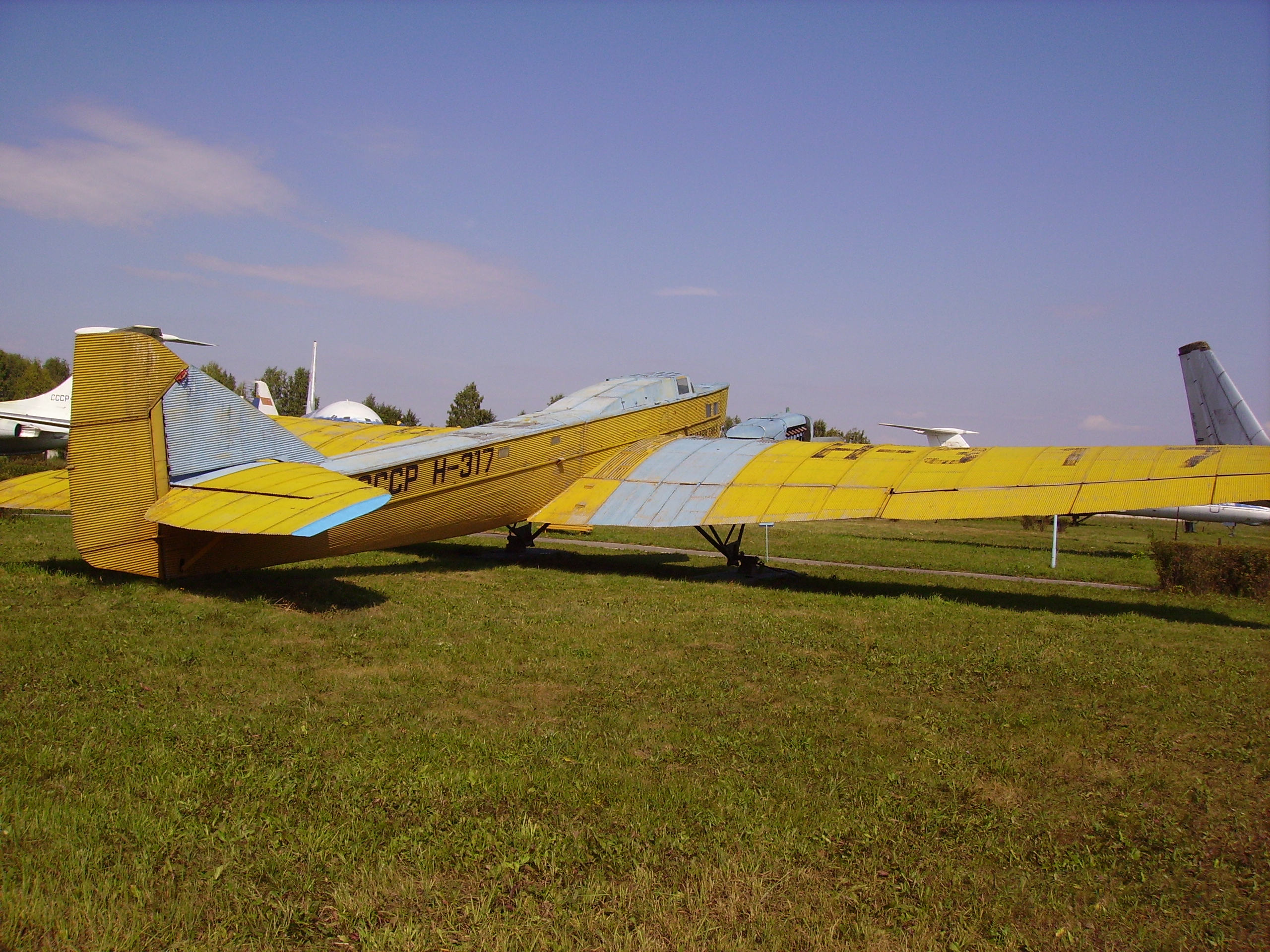
- ANT-4 at the Ulyanovsk Aircraft Museum

General information
- Type: Heavy bomber
- National origin: Soviet Union
- Manufacturer: Tupolev
- Primary users: Soviet Air Forces Aeroflot
- Number built: 218

History
- Manufactured: 1929–1932
- Introduction date: 1929
- First flight: 26 November 1925
- Retired: 1948
- Developed into: Tupolev ANT-7; Tupolev TB-3

The Tupolev TB-1 (Note: 'TB' is an abbreviation of Тяжёлый бомбардировщик (Tyazholy Bombardirovschik), Russian "heavy bomber") (development name ANT-4) was a Soviet bomber aircraft, an angular monoplane that served as the backbone of the Soviet bomber force for many years, and was the first large all-metal aircraft built in the Soviet Union.

== Design and development ==
In 1924, the Soviet Air Force instructed TsAGI, (Центра́льный аэрогидродинами́ческий институ́т (ЦАГИ) – Tsentralniy Aerogidrodinamicheskiy Institut or Central Aerohydrodynamic Institute) to design a heavy-bomber. TsAGI gave the task to the division led by Andrei Tupolev. Tupolev's team designed a twin-engined all-metal monoplane with a corrugated Duralumin skin — based on Tupolev's earlier work utilizing the all-metal aircraft design techniques first pioneered by Hugo Junkers in 1918 — powered by two Napier Lion engines, and named the ANT-4.

The first prototype was built during 1925 on the second floor of Tupolev's factory in Moscow, it being necessary to knock down a wall to allow the aircraft to be taken out of the building in pieces. After reassembly at Moscow's Khodynka Aerodrome, it was flown on 26 November 1925.

Testing was successful, and it was decided to put the ANT-4 into production as the TB-1. Production was delayed, however, by shortages of aluminium, and by the need to find a replacement for the expensive imported Lion engines, the BMW VI (and later the Soviet licence-built version, the Mikulin M-17). Production eventually started at the ex-Junkers factory at Fili, Moscow in 1929, 216 following the two prototypes, production continuing until 1932. It was produced in both wheel- and float-gear variants (a total of 66 ANT-4 seaplanes built).

== Operational history ==
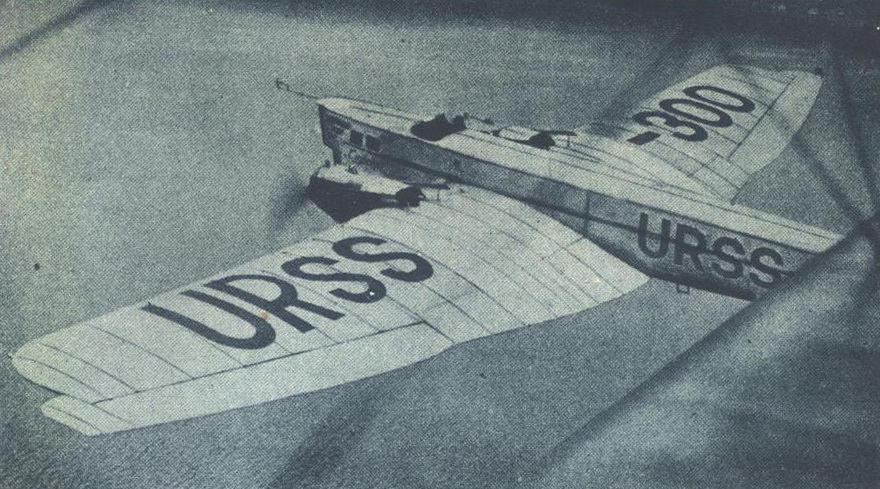
Strana Sovyetov during the flight from Moscow to New York, 1929

The first production aircraft was completed as an unarmed civil aircraft, named Strana Sovyetov (Land of the Soviets) for a propaganda flight from Moscow to New York, taking an eastward course via Siberia, reaching its destination on 3 November 1929, flying 21,242 km (13,194 mi) in 137 flying hours. The TB-1 became the Soviet Air Forces' first standard heavy bomber, also being fitted with floats for use as a torpedo bomber (TB-1P), and for aerial survey operations.

It was also widely used for experimental purposes, being the first mothership used in the Zveno project carrying two Tupolev I-4 fighters over the aircraft's wings as parasite aircraft.

The TB-1 was replaced as a heavy bomber by the similar, but much larger, four-engined Tupolev TB-3, with many aircraft being converted to civil freighters (designated G-1) for use by Aeroflot and Aviaarktika, Aeroflot's polar division. One Avia Arktika ANT-4, flown by Anatoly Liapidevsky, played a key role in the rescue of the crew of the steamship Chelyuskin, which sank on 12 February 1934 after being trapped in ice near the Bering Strait. Liapidevsky was awarded the title of Hero of the Soviet Union. G-1s continued in use with Avia Arktika until 1948.

== Variants ==
- TB-1 : Twin-engined heavy bomber aircraft. Also known as the ANT-4.
- ANT-4bis : Third prototype.
- TB-1P : Twin-float torpedo-bomber seaplane.
- G-1 : Twin-engined transport aircraft.
- ANT-19 : Proposed passenger aircraft. Not built.

== Surviving aircraft ==
One ANT-4, an ex-Aviaarktika Tupolev G-1, survives, being preserved at the Ulyanovsk Aircraft Museum.

== Operators ==
Soviet Union

- Aeroflot
- Soviet Air Force
- Soviet Naval Aviation

== Specifications (TB-1) ==

Data from The Osprey Encyclopedia of Russian Aircraft 1875–1995

General characteristics

- Crew: 6
- Length: 18 m (59 ft 1 in)
- Wingspan: 28.7 m (94 ft 2 in)
- Height: 5.1 m (16 ft 9 in)
- Wing area: 120 m^{2} (1,300 sq ft)
- Airfoil: Tupolev A0 (20%)
- Empty weight: 4,520 kg (9,965 lb)
- Gross weight: 6,810 kg (15,013 lb)
- Powerplant: 2 × Mikulin M-17 V-12 water-cooled piston engine, 510 kW (680 hp) each
- Propellers: 2-bladed fixed-pitch propellers

Performance

- Maximum speed: 178 km/h (111 mph, 96 kn)
- Cruise speed: 156 km/h (97 mph, 84 kn)
- Range: 1,000 km (620 mi, 540 nmi)
- Service ceiling: 4,830 m (15,850 ft)
- Rate of climb: 3.03 m/s (596 ft/min)
- Wing loading: 56.8 kg/m^{2} (11.6 lb/sq ft)
- Power/mass: 0.15 kW/kg (0.091 hp/lb)

Armament

- Guns: 6 × DA machine guns
- Bombs: 1,000 kg (2,205 lb)

== See also ==
Related development

- Tupolev TB-3
- Tupolev R-6

Related lists

- List of interwar military aircraft
