= Tupolev ANT-8 =

ANT-8
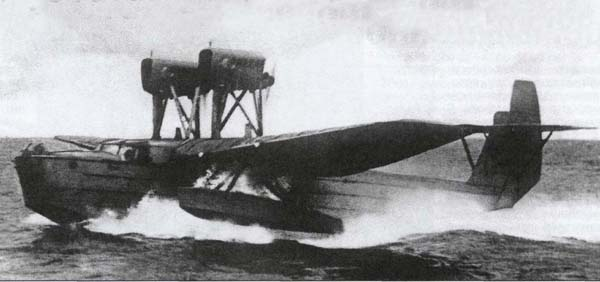

General information
- Type: Maritime patrol aircraft
- Manufacturer: Tupolev
- Status: Retired
- Primary user: Tupolev Factory
- Number built: 1

History
- First flight: 30 January 1931

The ANT-8 was an experimental flying boat designed by Tupolev. It was designated the "MDR-2" (MDR meaning Morskoi Dalnii Razvedchik, or Naval Long-Range Reconnaissance) by the military.

== Design and development ==
Tupolev and the TsAGI were asked to build the ANT-8 in 1925, but other projects were deemed more important. Thus, little was completed on the ANT-8. Finally, in 1930, with Ivan Pogosski leading, actual work was started on the aircraft. Its first flight was on January 30, 1931, piloted by S. Riballschuk. Shortly after the ANT-8 flew for the first time, the ANT-14 lifted off the ground.

=== Construction ===
The ANT-8 was chosen to be made entirely from metal, with a Duralumin hull and similar wings to the Tupolev R-6. The fuselage received much attention from the designers and it was decided to have the floats included in the load-bearing structure. Power came from two pusher BMW VI engines mounted over the wings. The aircraft was fitted with an enclosed cockpit for the two pilots, while turrets were mounted in the bow and aft of the wing, each mounting two DA-2 machine guns. Up to 500 kg (1,102 lb) of bombs could be carried under the wing roots.

Although the aircraft demonstrated excellent seaworthiness, and Tupolev learned much about flying boat hulls from it, continuation of the ANT-8 project was deemed unnecessary by the Soviet Navy, as it was believed that it was obsolete and would soon be superseded by the Chetverikov MDR-3. Only one was built, although its hull was modified several times.

== Operators ==
Soviet Union

- Tupolev factory.

== Specifications (MDR-2) ==
Data from The Osprey Encyclopedia of Russian Aircraft 1875–1995

General characteristics

- Crew: 4-5
- Length: 17.03 m (55 ft 10 in)
- Wingspan: 23.7 m (77 ft 9 in)
- Height: 5.67 m (18 ft 7 in)
- Wing area: 84 m^{2} (900 sq ft)
- Airfoil: root:Tupolev A0 (20%); tip: Tupolev A0 (14%)
- Empty weight: 4,560 kg (10,053 lb)
- Gross weight: 6,920 kg (15,256 lb)
- Max takeoff weight: 8,160 kg (17,990 lb)
- Powerplant: 2 × BMW VI V-12 water-cooled piston engines, 507 kW (680 hp) each
- Propellers: 2-bladed fixed-pitch propellers

Performance

- Maximum speed: 203 km/h (126 mph, 110 kn)
- Cruise speed: 166 km/h (103 mph, 90 kn)
- Range: 1,062 km (660 mi, 573 nmi)
- Endurance: 5 hours
- Service ceiling: 3,350 m (11,000 ft)
- Time to altitude: 1,000 m (3,300 ft) in 7 minutes
- Power/mass: 0.066 kW/kg (0.040 hp/lb)

Armament

- Guns: 4 × DA-2 machine guns in nose and dorsal turrets
- Bombs: Up to 500 kg (1,102 lb) bombs

== Bibliography ==
- Duffy, Paul and Andrei Kandalov. (1996) Tupolev, The Man and His Aircraft. Warrendale, PA: Society of Automotive Engineers.
- Gunston, Bill. The Osprey Encyclopedia of Russian Aircraft 1975–1995. London: Osprey, 1995. ISBN 1-85532-405-9.
