= Tupolev I-12 =

Soviet prototype aircraft

I-12 (ANT-23)

General information
- Type: Fighter
- National origin: Soviet Union
- Manufacturer: Tupolev
- Designer: Viktor Chernyshov
- Status: Retired
- Number built: One

History
- First flight: 1931

The Tupolev I-12 (also known as the ANT-23) was a prototype Soviet fighter aircraft that never reached production. The I-12 was of unconventional design with twin booms made of water pipes containing recoilless rifles and two engines in a push-pull configuration. The aircraft first flew in 1931 but did not enter production due to disappointing performance and operational difficulties such as the inability for the pilot to escape the aircraft without hitting the propeller arc behind him. The second prototype from Tupolev (designated ANT-23bis) was never completed.

== Specifications ==
Data from Shavrov 1985

General characteristics

- Crew: 1
- Length: 9.5 m (31 ft 2 in)
- Wingspan: 15.6 m (51 ft 2 in)
- Wing area: 30 m^{2} (320 sq ft)
- Airfoil: TsAGI 18%
- Gross weight: 2,400 kg (5,291 lb)
- Powerplant: 2 × Gnome-Rhône 9Ak 9-cylinder air-cooled radial piston engine, 392 kW (526 hp) each
- Propellers: 2-bladed fixed-pitch tractor and pusher propellers

Performance

- Maximum speed: 300 km/h (190 mph, 160 kn)
- Wing loading: 80 kg/m^{2} (16 lb/sq ft)
- Power/mass: 0.326 kW/kg (0.198 hp/lb)

Armament

- Guns: 2 × 76.2 mm (3 in) APK-4 recoilless rifles
