= Tupolev MTB-1 =

MDR-4 and MTB-1
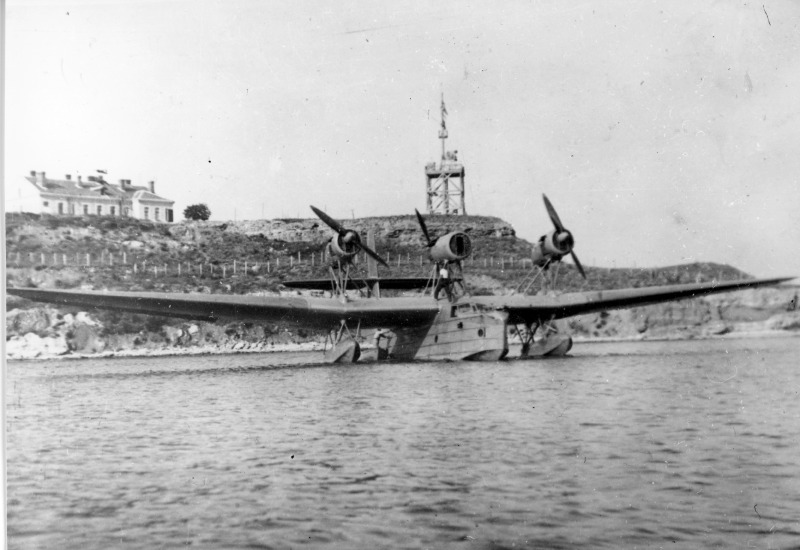

General information
- Type: Patrol flying boat
- Manufacturer: Tupolev
- Number built: 15

History
- First flight: 1934
- Retired: 1942

The Tupolev MTB-1 (known originally as the MDR-4 and internally to Tupolev as the ANT-27) was a patrol flying boat built in the Soviet Union in the mid-1930s. It was a refined version of the unsuccessful Chyetverikov MDR-3. The revised design retained the MDR-3's hull, but added a newly designed, full-cantilever wing, a new tail, and a new engine installation featuring two tractor and one pusher unit. Trials began in March 1934 but the prototype was destroyed during one takeoff.

A second prototype was constructed the following year, and redesignated MTB-1 to reflect a new torpedo-carrying role. Despite its poor performance in trials, the aircraft was urgently needed to fill a niche in the Soviet Navy, and it was accepted for production before flight testing was complete. Despite some early structural failures, 15 of these machines were eventually produced and saw service in the Navy for several years, remaining in service until 1942.

== Operators ==
Soviet Union

- Soviet Naval Aviation

== Specifications (MTB-1) ==
Data from The Osprey Encyclopaedia of Russian Aircraft 1875–1995

General characteristics

- Crew: c. eight
- Length: 21.9 m (71 ft 10 in)
- Wingspan: 39.4 m (129 ft 3 in)
- Wing area: 16.49 m^{2} (177.5 sq ft)
- Empty weight: 10,521 kg (23,195 lb)
- Gross weight: 16,250 kg (35,825 lb)
- Fuel capacity: 3,746 kg (8,259 lb) fuel + 370 kg (820 lb) oil
- Powerplant: 3 × Mikulin M-34 V-12 liquid-cooled piston engines, 600 kW (800 hp) each

Performance

- Maximum speed: 225 km/h (140 mph, 121 kn) at sea level 200 km/h (120 mph; 110 kn) at 3,000 m (9,800 ft)
- Range: 2,000 km (1,200 mi, 1,100 nmi)
- Endurance: 11 hours
- Service ceiling: 4,470 m (14,670 ft)
- Rate of climb: 3.1 m/s (610 ft/min)
- Time to altitude: 1,000 m (3,300 ft) 5.4 minutes

Armament

- Guns:
  - 1x 20 mm (0.787 in) Oerlikon cannon in a Tur-9 dorsal turret
  - 4x 7.62 mm (0.300 in) ShKAS machine-guns in twin mountings nose and tail
- Bombs: 500 kg (1,100 lb)

== Bibliography ==
- Gordon, Yefim & Rigamant, Vladimir (2005). OKB Tupolev: A History of the Design Bureau and its Aircraft. Hinckley, England: Midland Publishing. ISBN 1-85780-214-4.
- Gunston, Bill (1995a). The Osprey Encyclopedia of Russian Aircraft 1875–1995. London: Osprey. ISBN 1-85532-405-9.
- Gunston, Bill (1995b). Tupolev Aircraft since 1922. Annapolis, Maryland: Naval Institute Press. ISBN 1-55750-882-8.
