= Tupolev ANT-7 =

Russian military aircraft

R-6
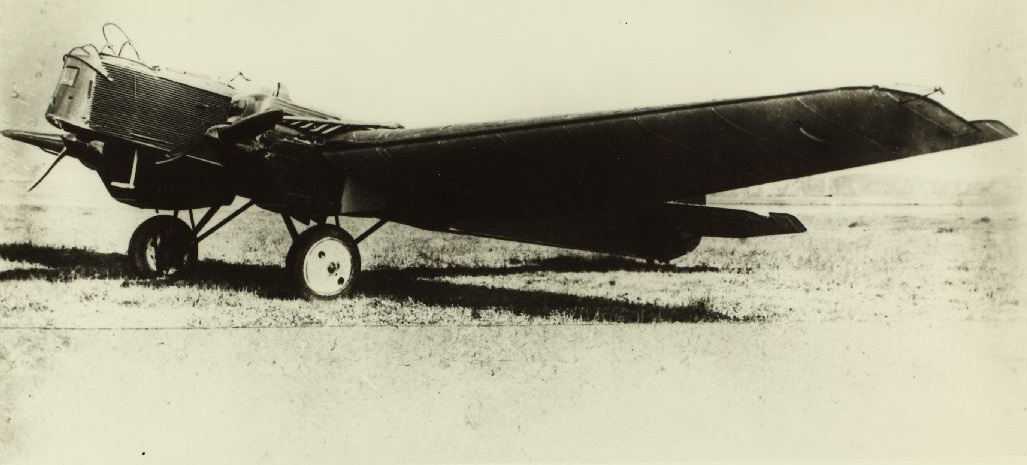

General information
- Type: Experimental aircraft
- Manufacturer: Tupolev
- Designer: TsAGI
- Status: Retired
- Primary users: VVS Aeroflot; Avia Arktika
- Number built: 411

History
- Manufactured: 1931–1934
- Introduction date: 1930s
- First flight: 20 October 1929
- Retired: 1941
- Developed from: Tupolev TB-1
- Developed into: Tupolev ANT-21

The Tupolev ANT-7, known by the VVS as the Tupolev R-6 ( R – razvedchik – reconnaissance), was a reconnaissance aircraft and escort fighter of the Soviet Union. The R-6 traces its roots back to early 1928 when the Soviet Air Force needed a long-range multirole aircraft. The requirements were that it could be used for long-range transport, defensive patrolling, reconnaissance, light bombing and torpedo attack.

== Design and development ==
Under Ivan Pogosski and guided by Andrei Tupolev, TsAGI developed the ANT-7 from the Tupolev TB-1 by scaling it down by about one third. Power for the ANT-7 was intended to be provided by two 388 kW (520 hp) – 455 kW (610 hp) Hispano Suiza engines or 313 kW (420 hp) Bristol Jupiter engines, but the prototype was powered by two 373 kW (500 hp) – 529 kW (709 hp) BMW VI engines.

The first flight of the ANT-7 took place on 11 September 1929, piloted by Mikhail Gromov. Flight tests started in March 1930 after TsAGi decided to postpone them until after the winter. That summer, the NII-VVS (Nauchno-Issledovatel'skiy Institut Voyenno-Vozdooshnykh Seel – air force scientific test institute) conducted state tests which revealed tailplane buffeting, which was alleviated by fitting enlarged elevators. The next flight encountered radiator damage and an engine failure, but in spite of this, the ANT-7 passed the state acceptance tests.

== Operational history ==
Production aircraft were designated R-6 by the Soviet Air Force. The first production aircraft was rolled off the GAZ-22, (GAZ – Gosudarstvenny Aviatsionnyy Zavod – state aviation plant/factory), assembly line in November 1931, a year after production started. Another 410 aircraft were made during the following three years: 385 at GAZ-22 in Moscow (one of these was the R-6 Limuzin), five at GAZ-31 in Taganrog (floatplanes designated KR-6P), and 20 more at GAZ-12 in Komsomolsk-on-Amur.

The standard aircraft crew consisted of the pilot, gunner and observer and the aircraft was able to carry 113.4 kg (250 lb) of bombs to a distance of up to 965.6 km (600 mi). Some were built with floats as the MP-6, (also known as KR-6P), for maritime patrol duties. Another variant was the KR-6 (KR – Kreiser Razveyedchik – cruiser reconnaissance), which had two PV-2 machine guns and a second gunner, that was later relegated to training duties.

By 1935, the R-6 was becoming obsolete, and several were transferred to Aeroflot and Avia Arktika, which used them to carry passengers and cargo in Siberia before the Great Patriotic War, designated PS-7-2M17 (the "2M17" showed that the aircraft were powered by two Mikulin M-17s), or as MP-6-2M17 if floats were attached.

== Variants ==
ANT-7
The OKB designation of the project and prototype, powered by two 544.4 kW (730 hp) BMW VI V-12 engines.
R-6
(R – Razvyedchik – reconnaissance) reconnaissance version, powered by two 544.4 kW (730 hp) Mikulin M-17F V-12 engines. first flight 1929, trials 1930.
KR-6
(KR – Kreiser Razvyedchik – cruiser reconnaissance) escort fighter version 1934, powered by two 507.1 kW (680 hp) Mikulin M-17 V-12 engines, fitted with two PV-2 machine guns and a second gunner.
KR-6P
Alternative designation of the MR-6 floatplane version.
MP-6 2M-17
(Morskoj Paassazhirskii – seaplane passenger transport) Civil floatplane version, powered by two 507.1 kW (680 hp) Mikulin M-17 V-12 engines..
PS-7 2M-17
(Paassazhirskii – passenger transport) Civil transport version PS-7 2M-17, cargo and passenger transport, first versions open cockpit, one version enclosed.
MR-6
(Morskoj razvyedchik – maritime reconnaissance) R-6, torpedo bomber version, 1932.
P-6
(Paassazhirskii – passenger transport) Civil cargo and passenger transport version.
R-6 Limuzin
Nine-seat civil transport version with a closed cockpit and a seven-seat cabin with glass windows and a luggage compartment. Powered by two 544.4 kW (730 hp) BMW VI V-12 engines. First flown in July 1933, the sole R-6L crashed on 5 September 1933 as a result of a maintenance error.
ANT-18
Ground attack version with two Mikulin M-34 engines, armor protection, and two dorsally-mounted machine guns.

== Operators ==
Military operators
Soviet Union

- Soviet Air Force
- Soviet Naval Aviation

Civil operators
Soviet Union

- Aeroflot
- Avia Arktika

== Specifications (R-6) ==
Data from The Osprey Encyclopedia of Russian Aircraft 1875 – 1995

General characteristics

- Crew: four
- Length: 15.06 m (49 ft 5 in)
- Wingspan: 23.2 m (76 ft 1 in)
- Wing area: 80 m^{2} (860 sq ft)
- Empty weight: 3,856 kg (8,501 lb)
- Gross weight: 6,472 kg (14,268 lb)
- Powerplant: 2 × Mikulin M-17F V-12 water-cooled piston engines, 540 kW (720 hp) each

Performance

- Maximum speed: 230 km/h (140 mph, 120 kn) at sea level 216 km/h (134 mph) at 3,000 m (9,843 ft)
- Range: 800 km (500 mi, 430 nmi)
- Service ceiling: 5,620 m (18,440 ft)
- Rate of climb: 2.7 m/s (530 ft/min)
- Wing loading: 81 kg/m^{2} (17 lb/sq ft)
- Power/mass: 0.170 kW/kg (0.10 hp/lb)
- Take-off distance: – 160 m (525 ft) / 11 seconds
- Landing distance: – 250 m (820 ft) at 110 km/h (68 mph)

Armament

- 5 × 7.62 mm (0.3 in) DA-2 machine guns

== See also ==
Related development

- Tupolev TB-1
- Tupolev ANT-8
- Tupolev ANT-9

Related lists

- List of interwar military aircraft
- List of military aircraft of the Soviet Union and the CIS

== Bibliography ==
- Duffy, Paul & Kandalov, Andrei. (1996) Tupolev, The Man and His Aircraft. Warrendale, Pennsylvania: Society of Automotive Engineers. ISBN 1-56091-899-3
- Gordon, Yefim & Rigamant, Vladimir (2005). OKB Tupolev: A History of the Design Bureau and its Aircraft. Hinckley, England: Midland Publishing. ISBN 1-85780-214-4.
- Gunston, Bill (1995a). The Osprey Encyclopedia of Russian Aircraft 1875–1995. London: Osprey. ISBN 1-85532-405-9.
- Gunston, Bill (1995b). Tupolev Aircraft since 1922. Annapolis, Maryland: Naval Institute Press. ISBN 1-55750-882-8.
- Kulikov, V. & Kotel'nikov, V. (January 2001). "Les Tupolev ANT-7 et dérivés: des avions victimes du "mal de mer"" [The Tupolev ANT-7 and its Derivatives: The Aircraft Victims of "Seasickness"]. Avions: Toute l'Aéronautique et son histoire (in French) (94): 48–54. ISSN 1243-8650.
- Kulikov, V. & Kotel'nikov, V. (February 2001). "Un B.C.R. à la soviétique: le Tupolev R-6/KR-6 et ses dérivés" [A Soviet B.C.R.: The Tupolev R-6/KR-6 and its Derivatives]. Avions: Toute l'Aéronautique et son histoire (in French) (95): 35–40. ISSN 1243-8650.
- Kulikov, V. & Kotel'nikov, V. (January 2001). "Les Tupolev R-6 et leurs dérivés durant la Seconde Guerre Mondiale" [The Tupolev R-6 and Their Derivatives During the Second World War]. Avions: Toute l'Aéronautique et son histoire (in French) (94): 48–55. ISSN 1243-8650.
