= Tupolev =

Russian aerospace and defense company

UAC Tupolev

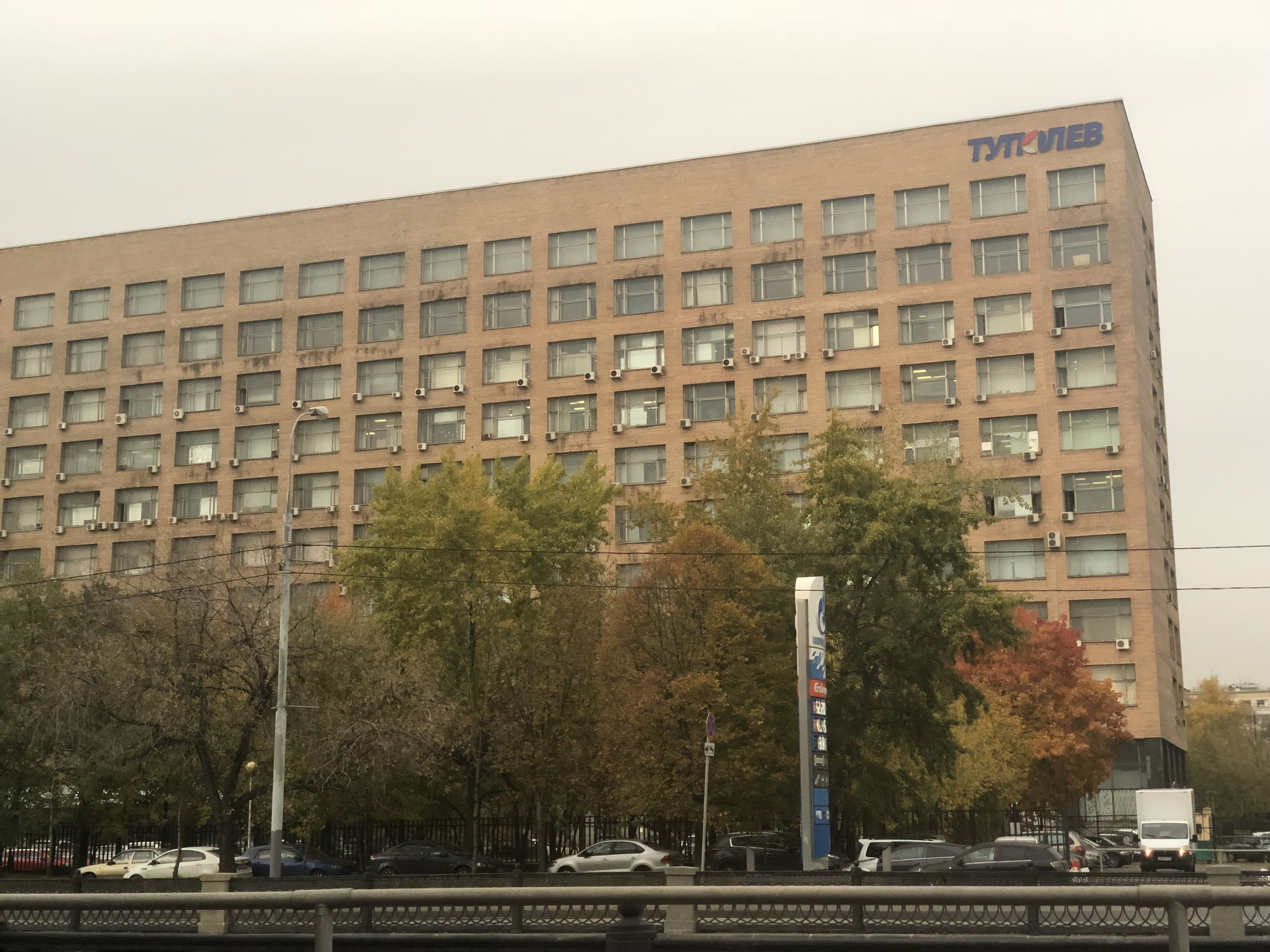
- Tupolev Headquarters at the shore of the Yauza river in Moscow
- Native name: Russian: «ОАК Туполев» Конструкторское бюро
- Company type: Division
- Industry: Aerospace manufacturer; Defense
- Founded: 22 October 1922; 103 years ago
- Founder: Andrei Tupolev
- Fate: merged into United Aircraft Corporation
- Headquarters: Academician Tupolev Embankment 17, Basmanny District, Central Administrative Okrug, Moscow, Russia
- Key people: Ronis Sharipov, director general
- Products: Commercial airliners; Military aircraft
- Revenue: $437 million (2017)
- Operating income: $37.4 million (2017)
- Net income: −$1.78 million (2017)
- Total assets: $3.01 billion (2017)
- Total equity: $1.36 billion (2017)
- Number of employees: 3524 (2011)
- Parent: United Aircraft Corporation
- Website: tupolev.ru/en/

Tupolev (Russian: Туполев, IPA: [ˈtupəlʲɪf]), officially United Aircraft Company Tupolev - Public Joint Stock Company, is a Russian aerospace and defense company headquartered in Basmanny District, Moscow.

UAC Tupolev is successor to the Soviet Tupolev Design Bureau (OKB-156, design office prefix Tu) founded in 1922 by aerospace pioneer and engineer Andrei Tupolev, who led the company for 50 years until his death in 1972. Tupolev designed over 100 models of civilian and military aircraft and produced more than 18,000 aircraft for Russia, the Soviet Union and the Eastern Bloc since its founding, and celebrated its 100th anniversary on 22 October 2022. Tupolev is involved in numerous aerospace and defense sectors including development, manufacturing, and overhaul for both civil and military aerospace products such as aircraft and weapons systems, and also missile and naval aviation technologies.

In 2006, Tupolev became a division of the United Aircraft Corporation in a merger with Mikoyan, Ilyushin, Irkut, Sukhoi, and Yakovlev by decree of the Russian president Vladimir Putin.

== History ==
=== In the USSR ===
Tupolev OKB was founded by Andrei Tupolev in 1922. Its facilities are tailored for aeronautics research and aircraft design only, manufacturing is handled by other firms. It researched all-metal airplanes during the 1920s, based directly on the pioneering work already done by Hugo Junkers during World War I.

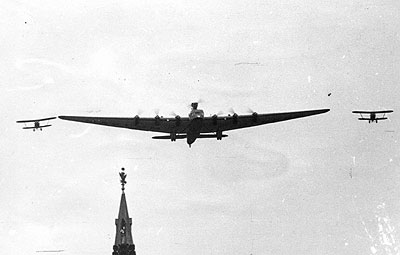
Tupolev ANT-20 Maxim Gorky, the largest airplane of the 1930s, was used for Stalinist propaganda.

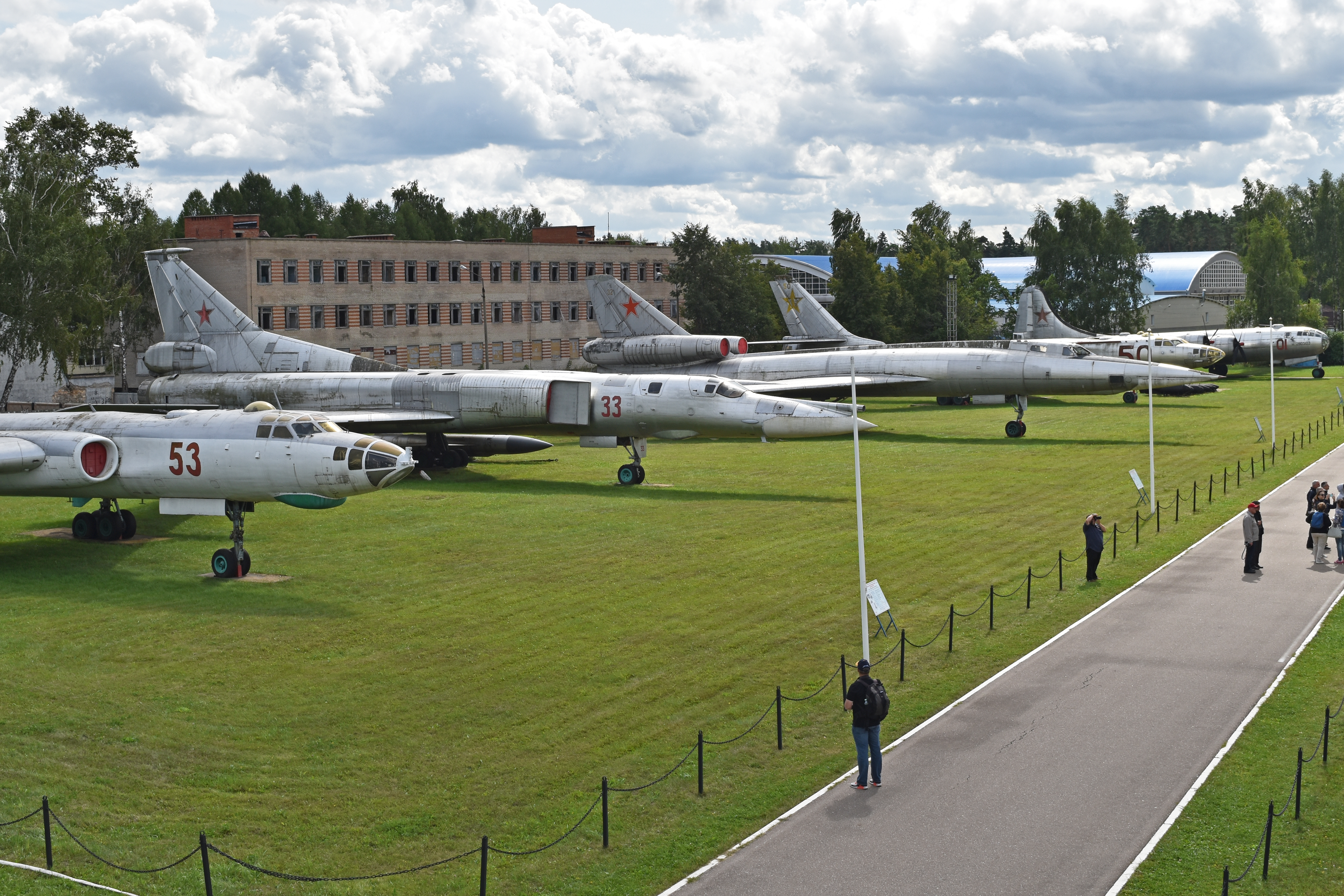
Multiple generations of Cold War era Tupolev bombers at Central Air Force Museum, from Tu-4 to Tu-22M

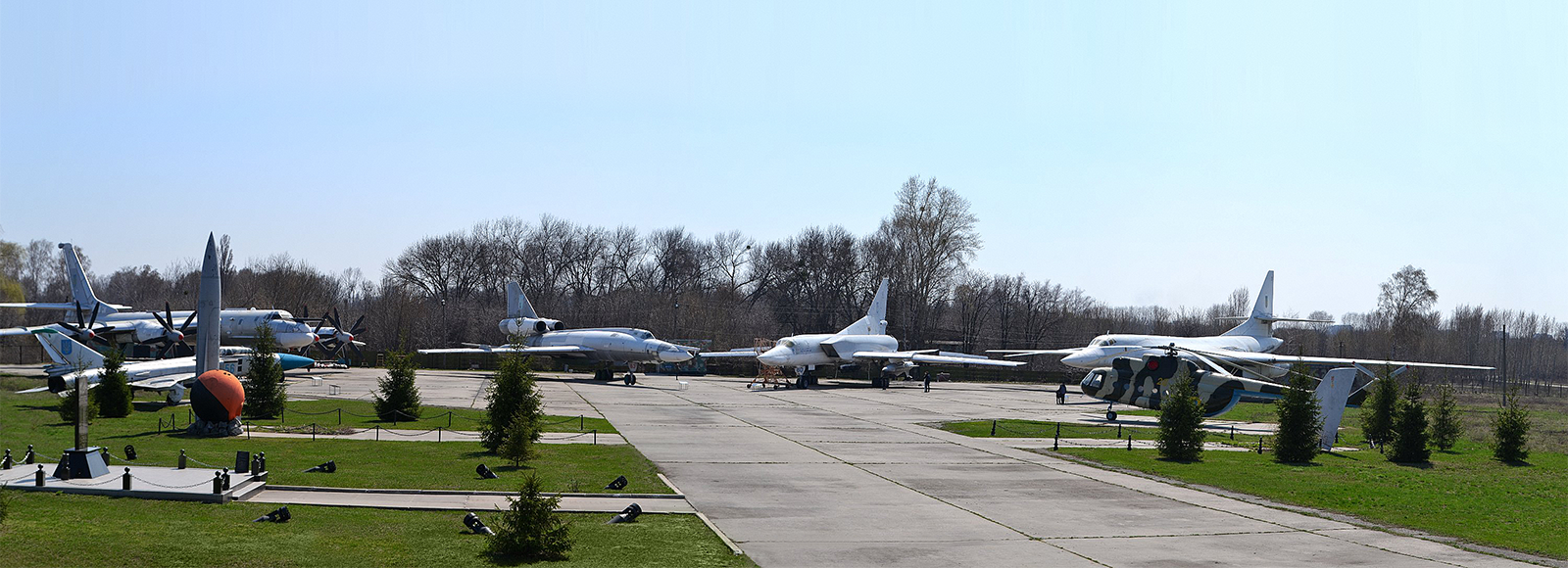
Tu-95, Tu-22, Tu-22M, Tu-160 bombers at Poltava Museum of Long-Range and Strategic Aviation

Among the notable results during Tupolev's early period were two significant all-metal heavy bombers with corrugated duralumin skins, the ANT-4 twin-engined bomber which first flew in 1925 and the four-engined ANT-6 of 1932, from which such airplanes as the ANT-20 were derived. Tupolev's design approach in these two airplanes defined for many years the trends of heavy aircraft development, civil and military.

During World War II, the twin-engined, all-metal Tu-2 was one of the best front-line bombers of the Soviets. Several variants of it were produced in large numbers from 1942. During the war it used wooden rear fuselages due to a shortage of metal.

After the war it would also produce the Tu-4, a copy of the American B-29 Superfortress. This was succeeded by the development of the jet-powered Tu-16 bomber, which used a sweptback wing for good subsonic performance.

As turbojets were not fuel efficient enough to provide truly intercontinental range, the Soviets elected to design a new bomber, the Tu-20, more commonly referred to as the Tu-95. It, too, was based on the fuselage and structural design of the Tu-4, but with four colossal Kuznetsov NK-12 turboprop engines providing a unique combination of jet-like speed and long range. It became the definitive Soviet intercontinental bomber, with intercontinental range and jet-like performance. In many respects the Soviet equivalent of the Boeing B-52 Stratofortress, it served as a strategic bomber and in many alternate roles, including reconnaissance and anti-submarine warfare.

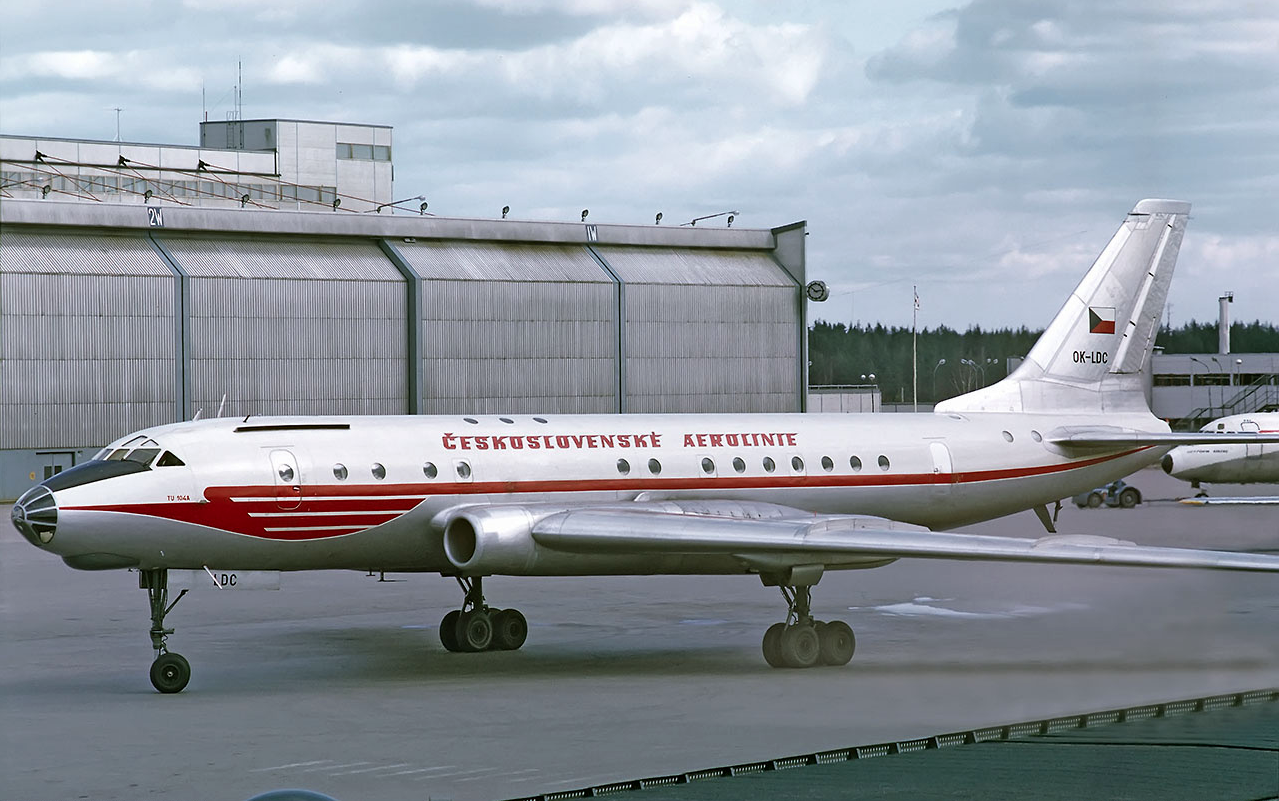
Tu-104, the first Soviet jet airliner.

The Tu-16 was developed into the civil Tu-104. The Tu-95 became the basis of the unique Tu-114 medium-to-long-range airliner, the fastest turboprop aircraft ever. One common feature found in many large subsonic Tupolev jet aircraft is large pods extending rearward from the trailing edge of the wings, holding the aircraft's landing gear. These allow the aircraft to have landing gears made up of many large low-pressure tires, which are invaluable for use on the poor quality runways that were common in the Soviet Union at the time. For example, the Tu-154 airliner, the Soviet equivalent of the Boeing 727, has 14 tyres, the same number as Boeing's far larger 777-200.

Even before the first flights of the Tu-16 and Tu-20/Tu-95, Tupolev was working on supersonic bombers, culminating in the unsuccessful Tu-98. Although that aircraft never entered service, it became the basis for the prototype Tu-102 (later developed into the Tu-28 interceptor) and the Tu-105, which evolved into the supersonic Tu-22 bomber in the mid-1960s. Intended as a counterpart to the Convair B-58 Hustler, the Tu-22 proved rather less capable, although it remained in service much longer than the American aircraft. Meanwhile, the "K" Department was formed in the Design Bureau, with the task of designing unmanned aircraft such as the Tu-139 and the Tu-143 unmanned reconnaissance aircraft.

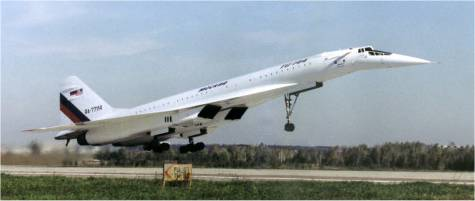
Tu-144 supersonic airliner

In the 1960s A. N. Tupolev's son, A. A. Tupolev, became active with management of the agency. His role included the development of the world's first supersonic airliner, the Tu-144, the popular Tu-154 airliner and the Tupolev Tu-22M strategic bomber. All these developments enabled the Soviet Union to achieve strategic military and civil aviation parity with the West.

The Tu-144 proved a disappointment, with crashes in 1973 and 1978 resulting in its withdrawal as a passenger aircraft in 1978.

In the 1970s, Tupolev concentrated its efforts on improving the performance of the Tu-22M bombers, whose variants included maritime versions. It is the presence of these bombers in quantity that brought about the SALT I and SALT II treaties. Also the efficiency and performance of the Tu-154 was improved, culminating in the efficient Tu-154M.

In the 1980s the design bureau developed the supersonic Tu-160 strategic bomber. Features include variable-geometry wings.

=== Post-Soviet era ===
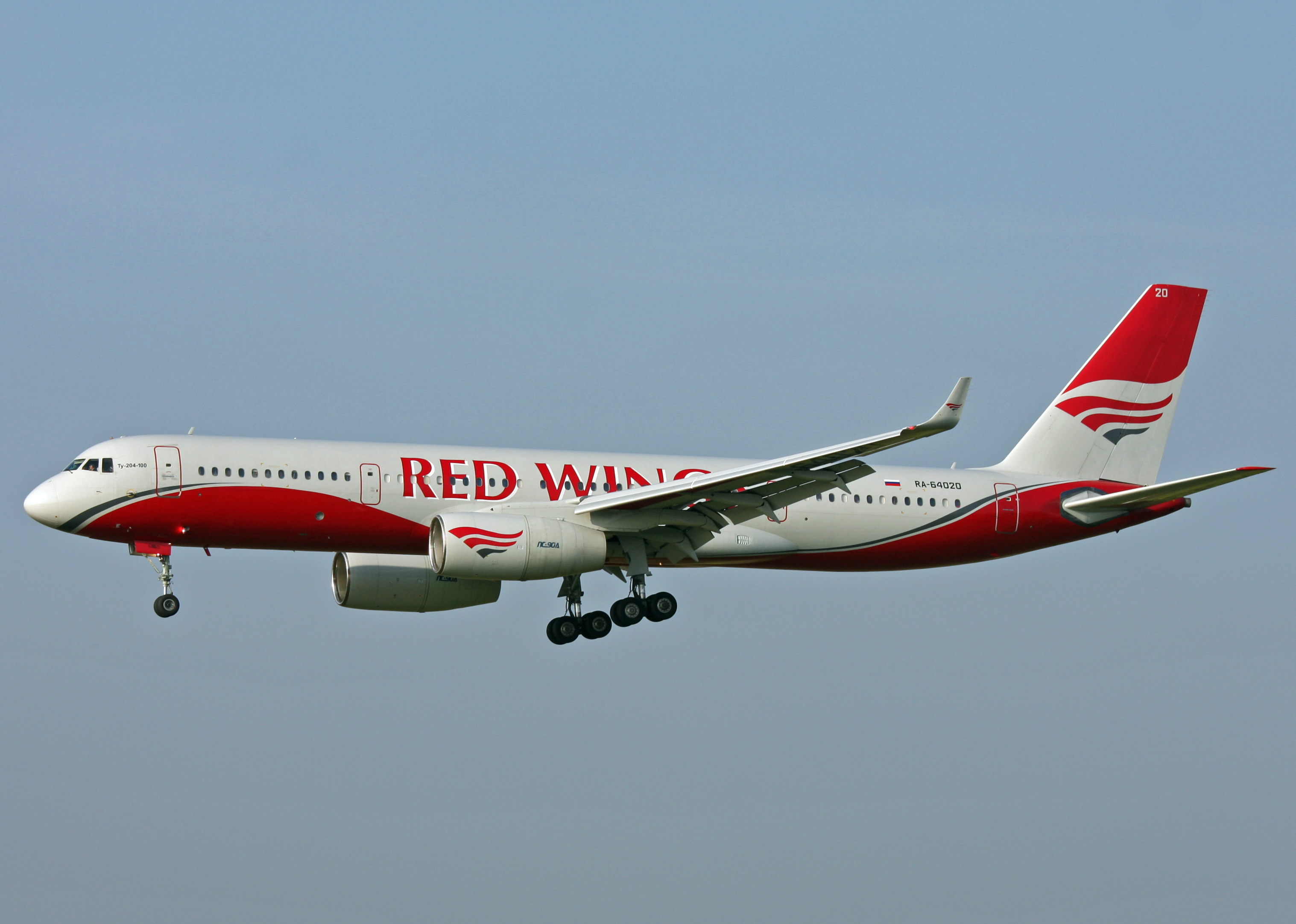
Tupolev Tu-204.

With the end of the Cold War, research work was concentrated on subsonic civil aircraft, mainly on operating economics and alternative fuels. The developments include fly-by-wire, use of efficient high-bypass turbofans and advanced aerodynamic layouts for the 21st century transport aircraft such as the Tu-204/Tu-214, Tu-330 and Tu-334.

Among Tupolev projects from the 1990s to the 2000s:

- further development of Tu-204/214 and TU-334 aircraft family
- development of cargo aircraft Tu-330, regional and executive Tu-324 aircraft
- research on practical aspects of aircraft operation using alternative fuels
- modernization of Russian Naval Aviation and Air Force

At the MAKS-2003 airshow, Tupolev revealed the Tu-444 supersonic business jet concept; development was intended to start in the first half of 2004. However, there has not been any updates on the development, leading to belief that the development may be in question.

In early 2023 United Aircraft Corporation confirmed it would get Tupolev to produce 20 aircraft a year of the TU-214 variant and to develop a freighter version to meet Russia's needs.

== Directors ==
- Andrei Nikolayevich Tupolev was a leading designer at the Moscow-based Central Aero-Hydrodynamic Institute (TsAGI) from 1929 until his death in 1972. This design bureau produced mostly bombers and airliners.
- Alexei Andreyevich Tupolev, son of Andrei Tupolev, was also a famous aircraft designer. His most famous design was the supersonic airliner Tupolev Tu-144. He managed Tupolev until his death in 2001.
- Igor Sergeevich Shevchuk was named the Director of OAO Tupolev in 1997, later the Chairman of the Board of Directors, and in 2001 the President and General Designer. He died unexpectedly in 2011.
- Alexandr Vladimirovich Koniukhov was a director general in 2016–2020.
- Ronis Nakipovich Sharipov appointed a director general in May 2020.
- Vadim Vladimirovich Korolev is a managing director since 2021.

In September 2021, Rustam Minnikhanov, President of Tatarstan was elected chairman of the board of directors of Tupolev.

== Awards ==
The staff of the Design Bureau has been awarded high state awards and commendations:

- 1927 – Order of the Red Banner of Labour of the RSFSR for work in the field of aerodynamics, achievements in the construction of aerial sleds, wind power plants, gliders, for testing aviation materials, building combat and passenger metal aircraft: 35 hp for a 100 hp engine, a 420 hp Scout type, a bomb carrier a special task.
- 1927 – Order of the Red Banner of Labour for the organization of mass production of metal combat vehicles for the air fleet. For serious scientific research and success on the economic front.
- 1933 – Order of the Red Banner for exceptional technical achievements, good organization of scientific research in the field of aerodynamics, hydrodynamics, strength of aircraft structures, for the creation and introduction into mass production at USSR factories of a number of new types of special passenger metal aircraft, which contributed to strengthening the technical power of the USSR and the country's defense capability.
- 1947 – Order of Lenin for outstanding achievements in the development of domestic aviation, in connection with the twenty-fifth anniversary of its existence.
- 1971 – Order of the October Revolution for the successful implementation of the five-year plan and the organization of production of new equipment.
- 1972 – Order of Lenin for great achievements in the creation of aviation technology and the training of design personnel in aircraft construction.

In 2007 and 2012 for their great contribution to the development of the aviation industry, the staff of JSC Tupolev was awarded the Gratitude of the President of Russia.

On April 18, 2018 the staff of PJSC Tupolev received the gratitude of the President of Russia for their great contribution to the development of the aviation industry and the successes achieved in their work. The high award was presented to Alexander Konyukhov, CEO of PJSC Tupolev, by Arkady Dvorkovich, Deputy Chairman of the Government of the Russian Federation. The ceremony of awarding state and departmental awards took place during an expanded meeting of the Board of the Ministry of Industry and Trade of the Russian Federation.

== See also ==
- List of Tupolev aircraft
- List of military aircraft of the Soviet Union and the CIS
- Antonov Design Bureau
