= List of aircraft (To) =

This is a list of aircraft in alphabetical order beginning with 'To'.

== To ==
=== Toczołowski-Wułw ===
(Henryk Toczołowski and Józef Wulf)

- Toczołowski-Wułw TW-12

=== Todd ===
(Edgar B Todd, Douglas, WY, 1929: Pueblo, CO)

- Todd 1924 Monoplane
- Todd Cirrus Special a.k.a. Todd-Alexander Racer
- Todd Light Express
- Todd Sport Trainer

=== Todd ===
(Edward Todd, Madison, WI)

- Todd Special

=== Tøjhusværkstederne ===
(Tøjhusværkstederne - depot)

- D.K.I
- D.K.II
- Tøjhusværkstederne- Orlogsværftet H-Maskine

=== Tokorozawa ===
(Tokorozawa Aviation School)

- Tokorozawa Koshiki-2

=== Tokyo ===
(Tokyo Koku KK - Tokyo Aviation Company Ltd.)

- Tokyo Koku Aiba-Tsubame 6
- Tokyo Koku Aiba-Tsubame 7
- Tokyo Koku Aiba-Tsubame 8
- Tokyo Koku Aiba 10
- Tokyo Koku Aiba 11
- Tokyo Koku Ki-107
- Tokyo Koku LXG1

=== Tokyo Gasu Denki ===
see: Gasuden

=== Tokyo University ===
(Tokyo Teikoku Deigaku - Tokyo Imperial University)

- Tokyo University LB-2
- Tokyo Imperial University Igo-1-C

=== Tomalesky ===
((Peter) Tomalesky Aviation, Umatilla, FL)

- Tomalesky TC-1
- Tomalesky TF-1 Tomcat

=== Tomark ===
(Tomark s.r.o., Prešov, Slovakia)

- Tomark SD-4 Viper
- Tomark Skyper GT9

=== Tomashevich ===
(Dmitri Lyudvigovich Tomashevich)

- Tomashevich 110
- Tomashevich Pegas

=== To-Mi Aviation ===
(Labem, Czech Republic)

- To-Mi Cross-5
- To-Mi Dolphin-3
- To-Mi Eco-6

=== Topliff ===
(Oliver Topliff, Springfield, IL)

- Topliff Model A Quail

=== Torigai ===
(Shigesaburo Torigai)

- Torigai Hayabusa-go

=== Towle ===
(Towle Aircraft Co., Detroit, MI)

- Towle TA-1
- Towle TA-2
- Towle TA-3
- Towle WC Amphibion

=== Townsend ===
(Gid Townsend, Ocala, FL)

- Townsend Thunderbird

=== Townsend ===
(K R Townsend, Tulsa, OK)

- Townsend A-1 Special

=== Toyo ===
(Toyo Aircraft Manufacturing Co. (Toyo Koku Kabushiki Kaisha))

- Toyo T-T.10

=== Toyota ===
- Toyota Model 191-4
- Toyota TAA-1
- Toyota TAA-2

=== Toys 4 Boys ===
- Toys 4 Boys JC 100
