= ZMC (disambiguation) =

ZMC is a private equity investment firm based in Manhattan, founded by Strauss Zelnick.

ZMC can also refer to:

- ZMC (airship), naval designation for metal-clad airship
- ISO 693-3 code for Margany language, a dialect of Bidjara language
- Zunyi Medical College, medical college in Guizhou, China
- ZENN Motor Company, Canadian electric vehicle company
- Zygomatico-maxillary complex, a human bony facial structure
- The Zion Mule Corps, a Zionist Jewish unit which served in the first world war.
