= VP-48 (1946–1991) =

Patrol Squadron 48
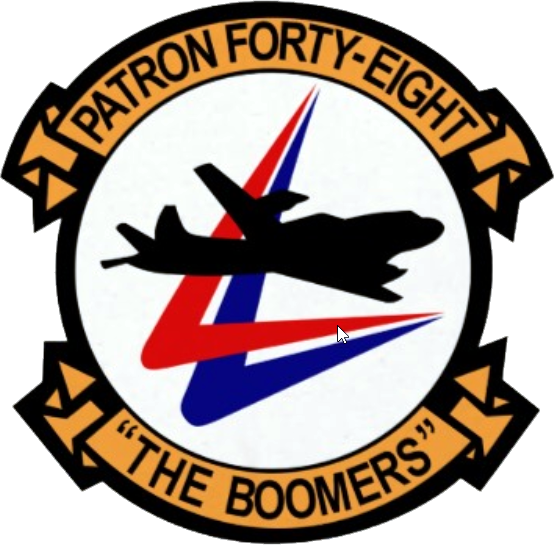
- VP-48 insignia
- Active: May 1946-23 May 1991
- Country: United States of America
- Branch: United States Navy
- Type: squadron
- Role: Maritime patrol
- Nickname(s): Boomerangers; Boomers
- Engagements: Korean War; Vietnam War

Aircraft flown
- Patrol: PBY-5A Catalina; PV-2 Harpoon; PBM-5 Mariner; P5M Marlin; P-3 Orion

VP-48 was a long-lived Patrol Squadron of the U.S. Navy, nicknamed the Boomerangers from 1975 to 1980, and the Boomers from 1981 to 1991. It was established as Reserve Patrol Squadron VP-905 in May 1946, redesignated Heavy Patrol Squadron (Landplane) VP-HL-51 on 15 November 1946, redesignated VP-731 in February 1950, redesignated VP-48 on 4 February 1953 and disestablished on 23 May 1991. It was the second squadron to be designated VP-48, the first VP-48 was disestablished on 31 December 1949.

== Operational history ==
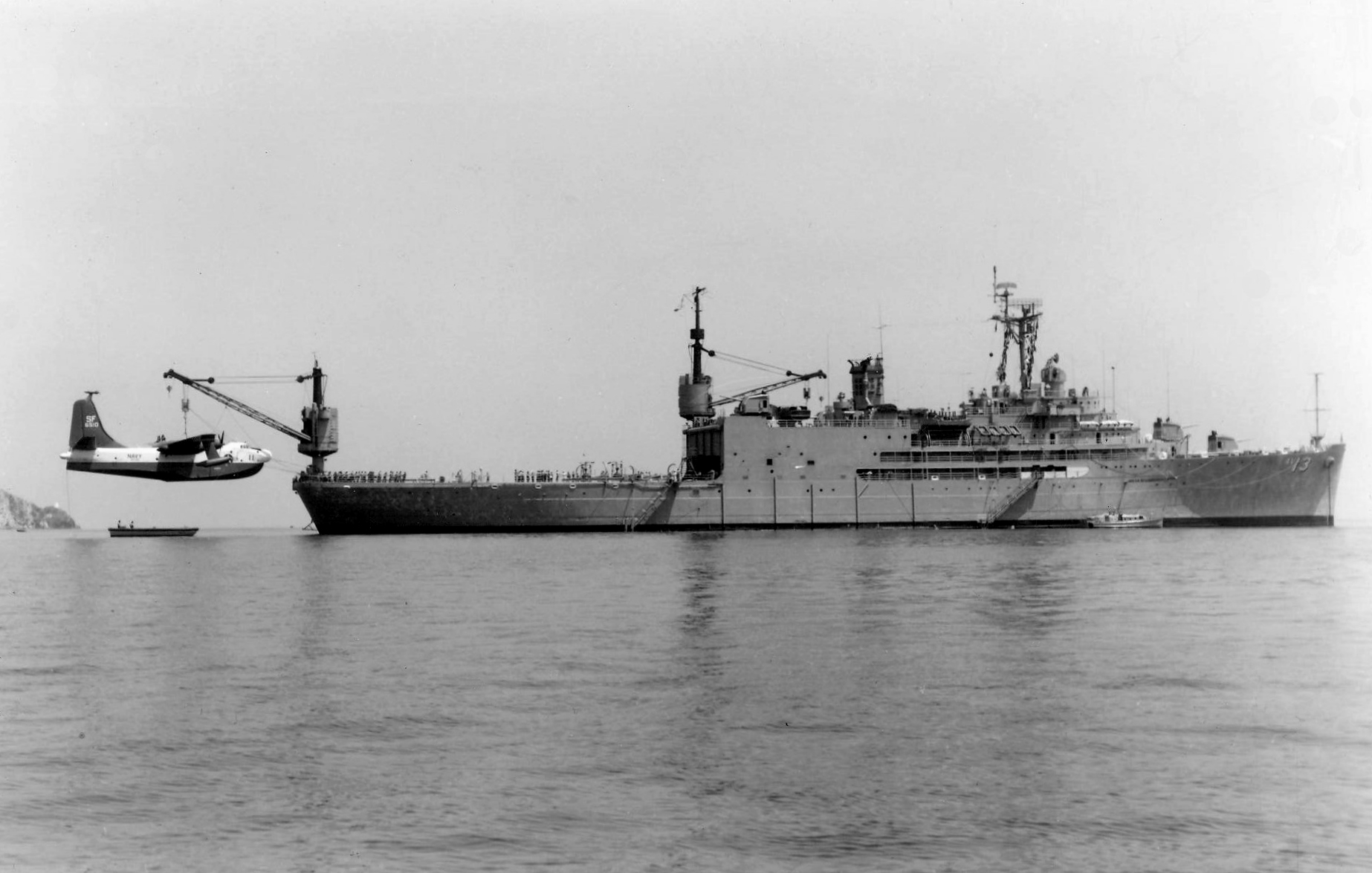
A VP-48 P5M-1 is lifted by USS Salisbury Sound in San Diego Bay, c.1957

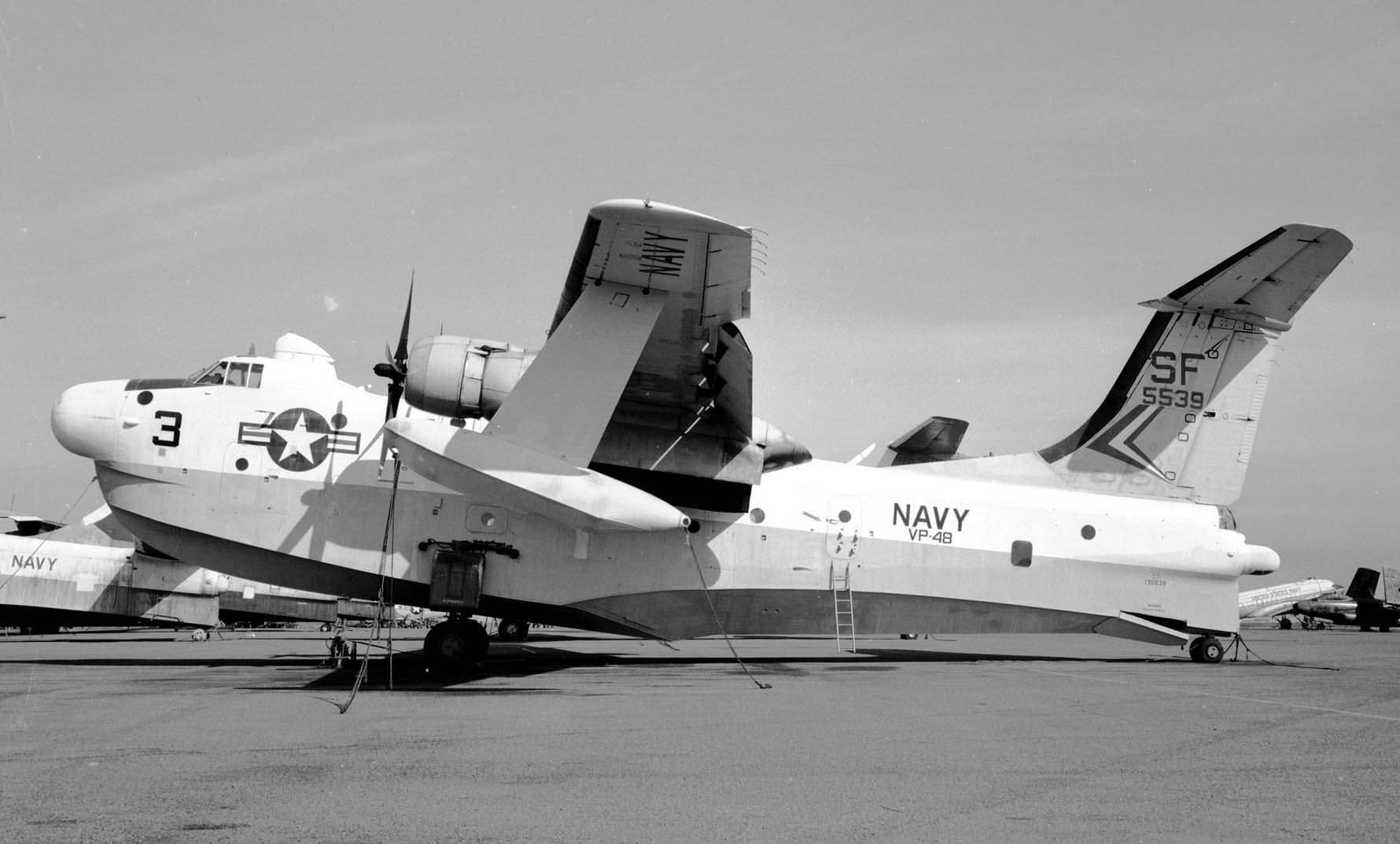
VP-48 SP5B at NAS San Diego, January 1967

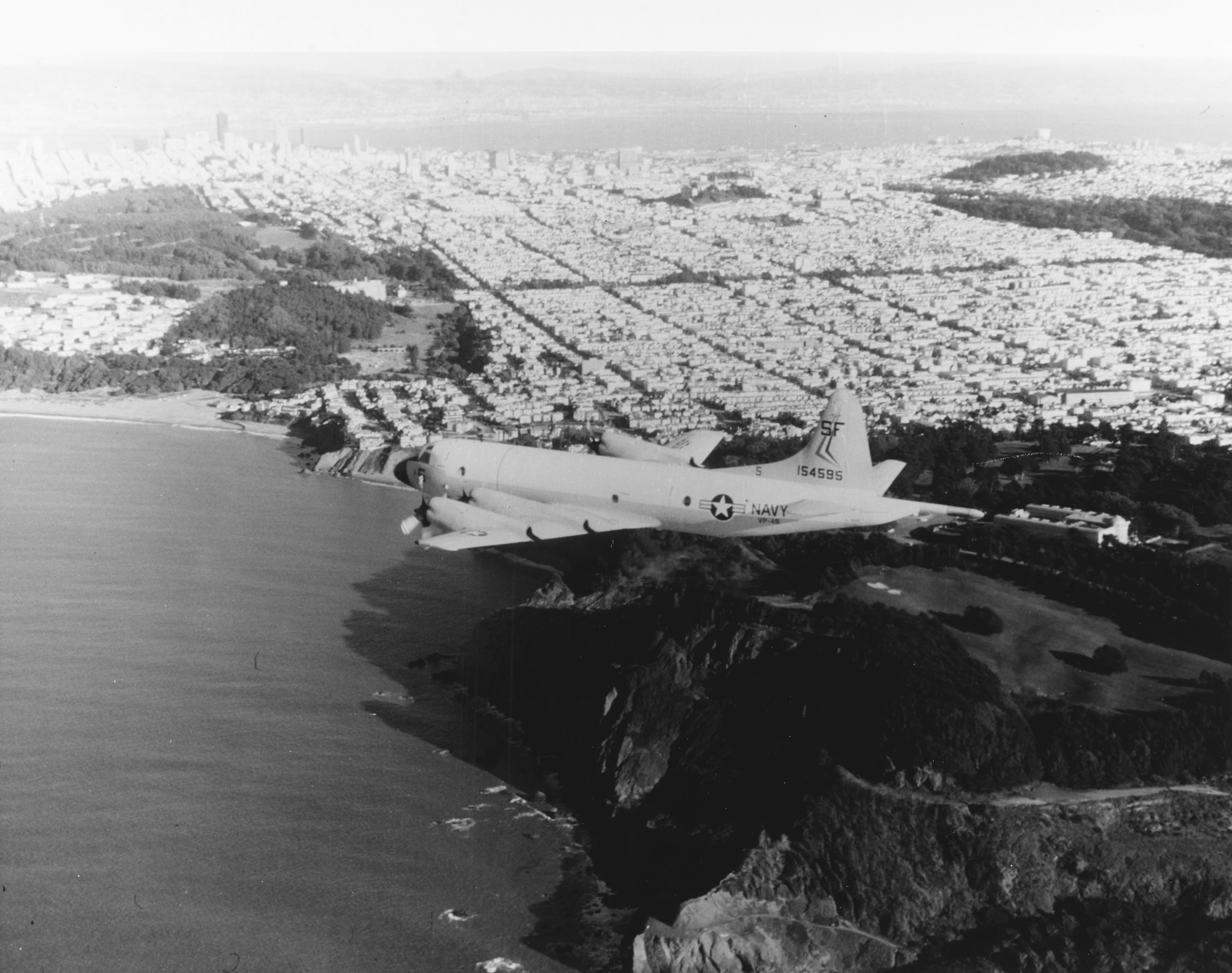
VP-48 over San Francisco in 1970

- May 1946: VP-905 was established at NAS Grosse Ile, Michigan, with an official active duty home port at NAS San Diego, Calif. The squadron came under the operational control of FAW-14 and administrative control of the Naval Air Reserve Training Command (NARTC). The squadron was one of 21 reserve squadrons established after the war to accommodate the large number of aircrews recently released from active duty and utilize the enormous stocks of aircraft in the inventory. The squadron flew the PBY-5A Catalina seaplane and the PV-2 Harpoon.
- 15 November 1946: All patrol squadrons were redesignated. Regular Navy squadron designations began with 1 and reserve patrol squadron designations began with 5. VP-905 was redesignated VP-ML-55. The ML for reserve patrol squadrons included twin-engine medium amphibian seaplanes, as well as twin-engine land-based bombers. Regular Navy patrol squadron ML designations were for twin-engine medium landbased bombers only. Amphibian medium seaplanes like the PBY-5A were in the AM category.
- February 1950: VP-ML-55 was redesignated VP-731 during the reorganization of Naval Aviation reserve units in 1949, but did not take effect until February 1950. During this period the number of Naval Aviation Reserve squadrons was reduced from the 1949 total of 24 to 9. By this date the squadron had transitioned to the PBM-5 Mariner.
- 29 September 1950: VP-731 was called to active duty due to the outbreak of the Korean War. The squadron reported for duty to Commander Naval Air Force Pacific Fleet at NAS San Diego, Calif. At the start of hostilities Navy patrol forces on active duty numbered just 20 squadrons and it quickly became apparent that this rather meager figure was inadequate to meet the increased demands. By the end of 1950 seven reserve patrol squadrons were called to active duty to augment the regular Navy patrol squadrons.
- 7 February 1951: VP-731 deployed to Buckner Bay, Okinawa, supported by USS Suisun. A detachment was maintained at Naval Station Sangley Point, Philippines, supported by USS Salisbury Sound. Both sections conducted patrols over the Formosa Strait and China coast. A single aircraft was detached to Hong Kong to provide courier service between Hong Kong and the Philippines.
- 29 May 1952: VP-731 began its second WestPac deployment based at Marine Corps Air Station Iwakuni, Japan, supported by USS Kenneth Whiting and USS Gardiners Bay. The squadron began combat operations over the Korean coastline on 1 June 1952. During the deployment the squadron alternated between Korea and the Formosa patrol area.
- 31 July 1952: A PBM-5S2 Mariner flown by Lieutenant E. E. Bartlett, Jr., was attacked by two Chinese MiG-15 fighters while on a reconnaissance patrol over the Yellow Sea off the west coast of Korea. Two crewmen were killed in the attack, tail gunner Aviation Machinist Mate H. G. Goodroad and Airman Claude Playforth. Two other crewmen were seriously wounded. Lieutenant Bartlett was able to escape the MiGs and land his heavily damaged Mariner at Baengnyeongdo, South Korea. Temporary repairs were made, enabling him to return to base at Iwakuni, Japan.
- July 1953: VP-48 began its third WestPac deployment to Korea just as the hostilities ceased on 27 July 1953. The squadron was based at NAF Iwakuni, supported by USS Kenneth Whiting and USS Gardiners Bay. During a patrol on 30 July the port engine of a squadron PBM-5S2 caught fire causing the plane to crash. Only five of the 15 personnel on board survived and were picked up by a Coast Guard PBM.
- June 1954: VP-48 transitioned from the PBM-5S2 Mariner to the P5M-1 Marlin seaplane.
- 3 May 1956: Two VP-48 Marlins en route from NAS North Island to Naval Station Pearl Harbor, Hawaii, ditched due to low fuel state. One aircraft was taken under tow by a USCG vessel. The USS Wasp stood by until the tender USS Pine Island arrived to retrieve the second aircraft.
- 22 October 1957: VP-48 deployed to MCAS Iwakuni, Japan. While transiting via Hawaii, two aircraft were detached by Commander Fleet Air Hawaii for evaluation of an experimental seaplane fueling buoy. The two aircraft rejoined the squadron at Iwakuni on 2 November 1957.
- 19 March–September 1964: The squadron made its first deployment in over four years to WestPac, relieving VP-40 at NAS Sangley Point. In the last month of the deployment, on 2 August 1964, the Gulf of Tonkin Incident brought VP-48 into the South China Sea to support fleet operations. During these operations the squadron accumulated over 1,500 hours on patrol.
- 1 October 1965 – September 1966: VP-48 deployed a six-aircraft detachment to NAS Sangley Point, rotating one relief crew and associated ground personnel to the detachment on a monthly basis. During the deployment the detachment conducted surveillance patrols over the South China Sea and Operation Market Time patrols over coastal Vietnam. While conducting these patrols the squadron was provided tender support at Cam Ranh Bay, South Vietnam, by USS Pine Island, and after February 1966, by USS Salisbury Sound. When operating from Buckner Bay, Okinawa, the squadron was supported by USS Currituck. The six aircraft that had been operated by the VP-48 detachment were transferred to VP-50 upon the conclusion of the deployment.
- 15 November 1966 – April 1967: VP-48 transitioned to the P-3A Orion and a permanent change of station to NAS Moffett Field, Calif. Effective 15 February 1967, VP-48 was administratively assigned to FAW-10 vice FAW-14. The squadron received its first P-3A on 23 January 1967. The final detachment of squadron personnel was transferred from NAS North Island in April 1967.
- 24 July 1967 – 31 January 1968: VP-48 deployed to MCAS Iwakuni, Japan, relieving VP-4. A two-aircraft detachment conducted operations from Guam and Midway islands. Additional detachments were maintained at NAS Sangley Point, in support of Vietnam combat missions. On 16 January 1968, a P-3A, BuNo. 152144, was lost and the entire crew killed in an accident. On 23 January 1968, the squadron commenced 24-hour ASW protection for USS Enterprise Task Force en route from Pearl Harbor to the Sea of Japan. Crew 4 was assigned to ASW protection as part of Operation Formation Star. The task force had been brought into the area as a result of the Pueblo Incident. The squadron returned to NAS Moffett Field in February 1968 and began transitioning to the P-3B Orion.
- 1 December 1968: VP-48 deployed to Naval Air Facility Adak, Alaska. The squadron earned a Meritorious Unit Citation for its performance in tracking Soviet naval units during the deployment.
- 1 April 1970: VP-48 deployed to NAS Sangley Point, with a detachment at Cam Ranh Bay Air Base, Vietnam. The detachment was responsible for detecting eight enemy trawlers attempting to ship arms and munitions to the Viet Cong. VP-48's performance during the deployment earned it a Meritorious Unit Commendation.
- 1 May 1971: VP-48 deployed to NAS Sangley Point, with a three-aircraft/four-crew detachment at U-Tapao Royal Thai Navy Airfield, Thailand. On 25 May, upon the closure of NAS Sangley Point, the squadron relocated to NAS Cubi Point, Philippines.
- 23 June–December 1972: VP-48 began a three-way split deployment with one detachment of three aircraft/four crews at NS Adak, Alaska; a second detachment of three aircraft/four crews at Naval Air Station Agana, Guam; and the remaining three aircraft/ four crews at NAS Moffett Field, Calif. In December the Agana detachment tracked Russian missile instrumentation ships and watching two Soviet missiles impact in the Soviet Missile Range landing zone.
- 10 July 1978: VP-48 deployed to NAF Misawa, Japan. Shortly after arrival at Misawa, the squadron was forced to fly away in the face of Typhoon Virginia to NAS Cubi Point.
- 10 November 1979: VP-48 deployed to NAF Kadena, Japan, with a detachment at Diego Garcia. During the deployment the squadron played an important role in locating Vietnamese refugee boats for rescue units. The Diego Garcia detachment was on constant standby during the Iranian Revolution.
- 2 December 1985 – May 1986: VP-48 deployed to NAS Adak, Alaska. On 7 May the 8.0 M_{w} 1986 Andreanof Islands earthquake struck while several squadron aircraft were airborne. The squadron executive officer communicated with the aircraft using a handheld transceiver until communications could be restored and the runways certified safe for landing.
- July 1986: The squadron's P-3C baseline Orions began block modification to the P-3C MOD version with new inertial navigation systems, secure HF radios and Harpoon missile capability.
- 15 June 1990: VP-48 deployed a three-aircraft and four-aircrew detachment to NAF Kadena. In Aug 1990, the detachment was relocated to NAS Cubi Point, in support of Operation Desert Storm.
- 23 May 1991: VP-48 was disestablished at NAS Moffett Field, Calif.

== Home port assignments ==
The squadron was assigned to these home ports, effective on the dates shown:

- NAS Grosse Ile, Mich. May 1946
- NAS San Diego/NAS North Island, Calif. 29 Sep 1950
- NAS Moffett Field, Calif. 15 Feb 1967

== Aircraft assignment ==
The squadron first received the following aircraft on the dates shown:

- PBY-5A May 1946
- PV-2 May 1946
- PBM-5S2 1950
- P5M-1 Jun 1954
- SP-5B 1960
- P-3A Jan 1967
- P-3B Feb 1968
- P-3C Baseline Nov 1971
- P-3C BLOCK MOD Jul 1986
- P-3C Update III Jan 1990

== See also ==
- Maritime patrol aircraft
- List of inactive United States Navy aircraft squadrons
- List of United States Navy aircraft squadrons
- List of squadrons in the Dictionary of American Naval Aviation Squadrons
- History of the United States Navy
