= List of military installations in Michigan =

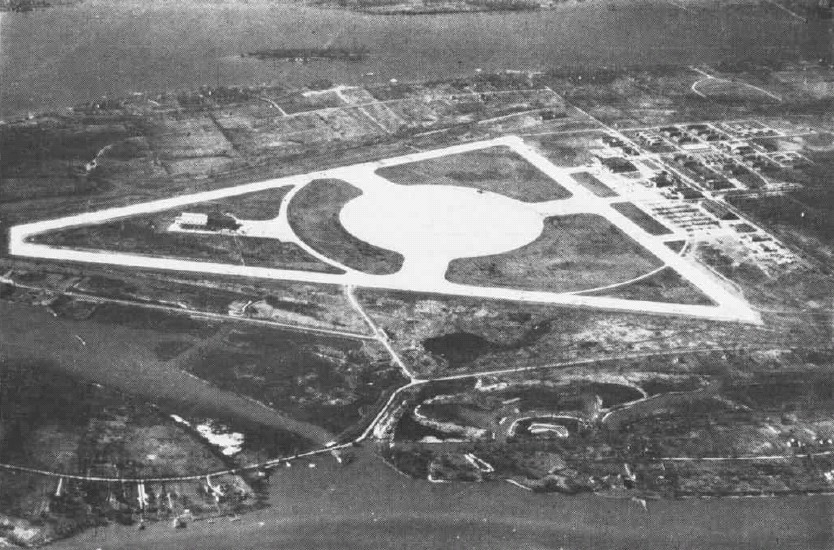
Naval Air Station Grosse Ile, on an island in the Detroit River, served to train Navy and Marine pilots and included a hangar for dirigibles.

Numerous military installations have been located in Michigan since the earliest French fortified trading posts appeared to modern National Guard bases. The Native Americans of the area established only temporary war camps although some were quite large (Chief Pontiac's 6-month encampment during the siege of Fort Detroit had around 1,000 warriors). The earliest French bases were quite small and short-lived. Later some installations would be in use for over a century (Fort Wayne, Fort Mackinaw) and spread over large areas (Fort Custer - 14,000 acres (57 km^{2}), Camp Grayling - 147,000 acres (590 km^{2})).

In chronological order:

== French colonial forts ==
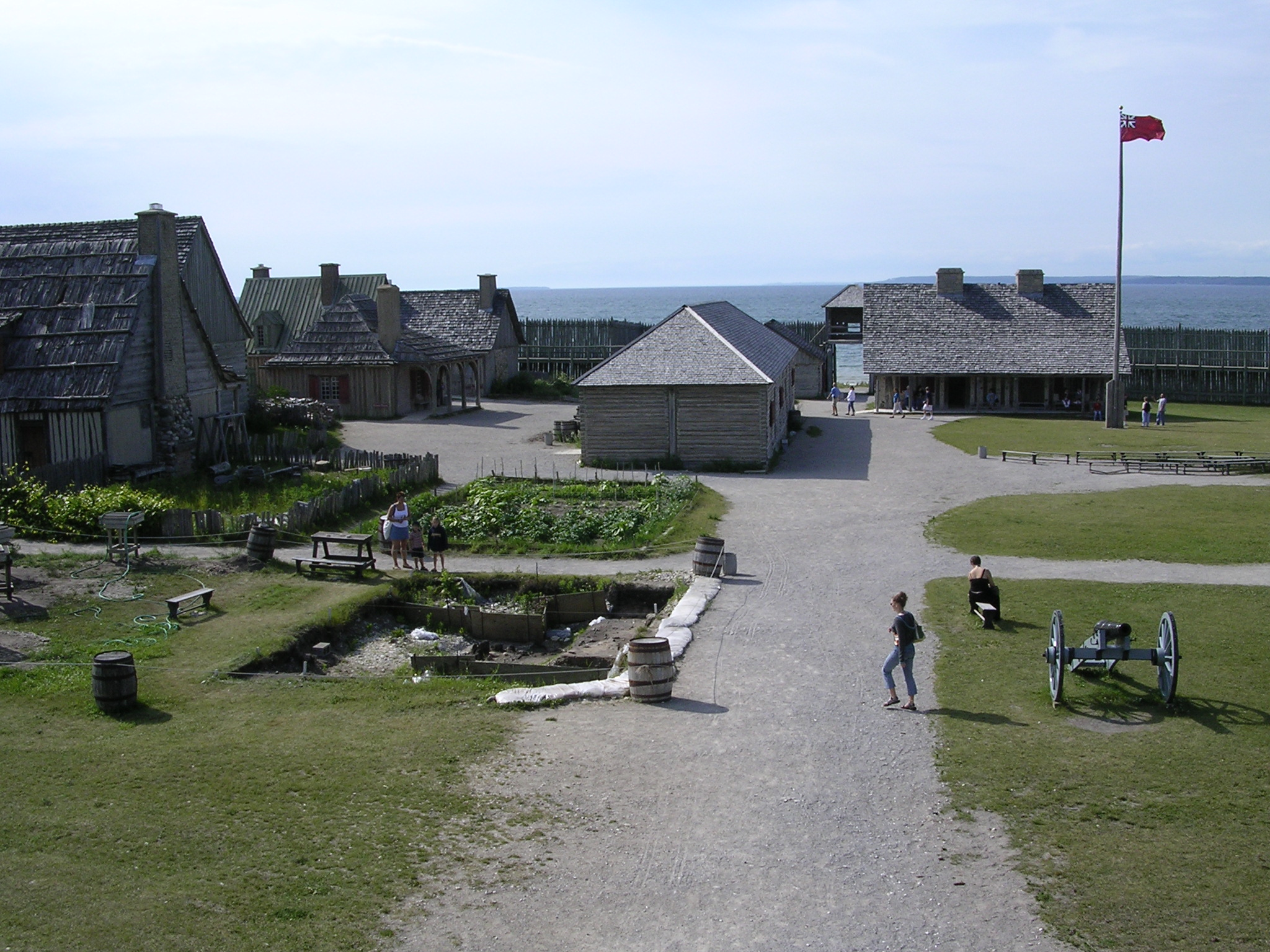
The reconstruction of Fort Michilimackinac is a state park and ongoing archaeological site.

- Fort Miami, at St. Joseph, Michigan, a stockade built by René-Robert Cavelier, Sieur de La Salle, in use from late 1679 to 1680
- Fort de Buade, in 1683 the Jesuit mission at St. Ignace was fortified, Fort de Buade was built in 1690 and was used until 1701
- Fort St. Joseph, Port Huron, built 1686, abandoned 1688
- Fort St. Joseph at Niles, Michigan, built in 1691, given to Britain 1761
- Fort Pontchartrain du Détroit, built in 1701, replaced Fort de Buade, turned over by the French to Britain in 1760 who used it until 1779, when it was replaced by Fort Lernoult
- Fort St. Philippe de Michilimackinac, (commonly called Fort Michilimackinac), at the Straits of Mackinac, built 1715 during the Fox Wars, turned over by the French to Britain in 1761 who used it until 1781, replaced by Fort Mackinac
- Fort Chevalier de Repentigny, at Sault Ste. Marie, built in 1751, captured by the British in 1760

== British colonial forts ==
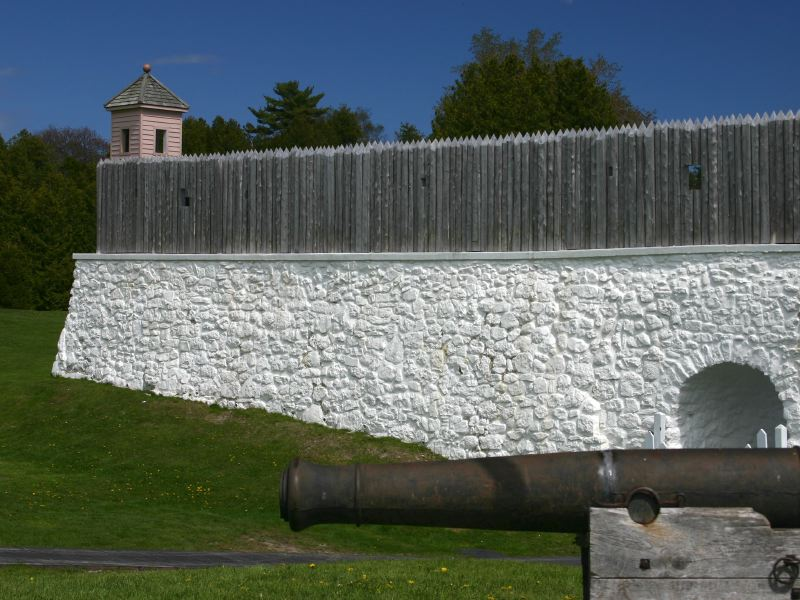
Fort Mackinac on Mackinac Island

The British assumed control of French forts in Michigan after defeating the French in the French and Indian War.

- Fort Detroit, in use from 1760 until 1779, when it was replaced by Fort Lernoult
- Fort de Repentigny, captured by the British in 1760, destroyed by fire in 1762
- Fort Michilimackinac, in use from 1761 until 1781, replaced by Fort Mackinac
- Fort St. Joseph, in use from 1763 until 1780, occupied by Spanish militia for one day in 1781
- Fort Sinclair, St. Clair County, built 1765, abandoned about 1785
- Fort Lernoult, built in 1779, turned over to the Americans in 1796, in British hands again during part of 1812–1813
- Fort Mackinac, built in 1781, turned over to the Americans in 1796, captured in the War of 1812, it was again under British control from 1812 to 1815
- Fort George, an inland blockhouse on Mackinac Island, during the War of 1812, renamed by Americans, Fort Holmes
- Fort Drummond, Drummond Island, built 1815, closed 1828

== American establishments ==
=== Forts and other Army bases ===
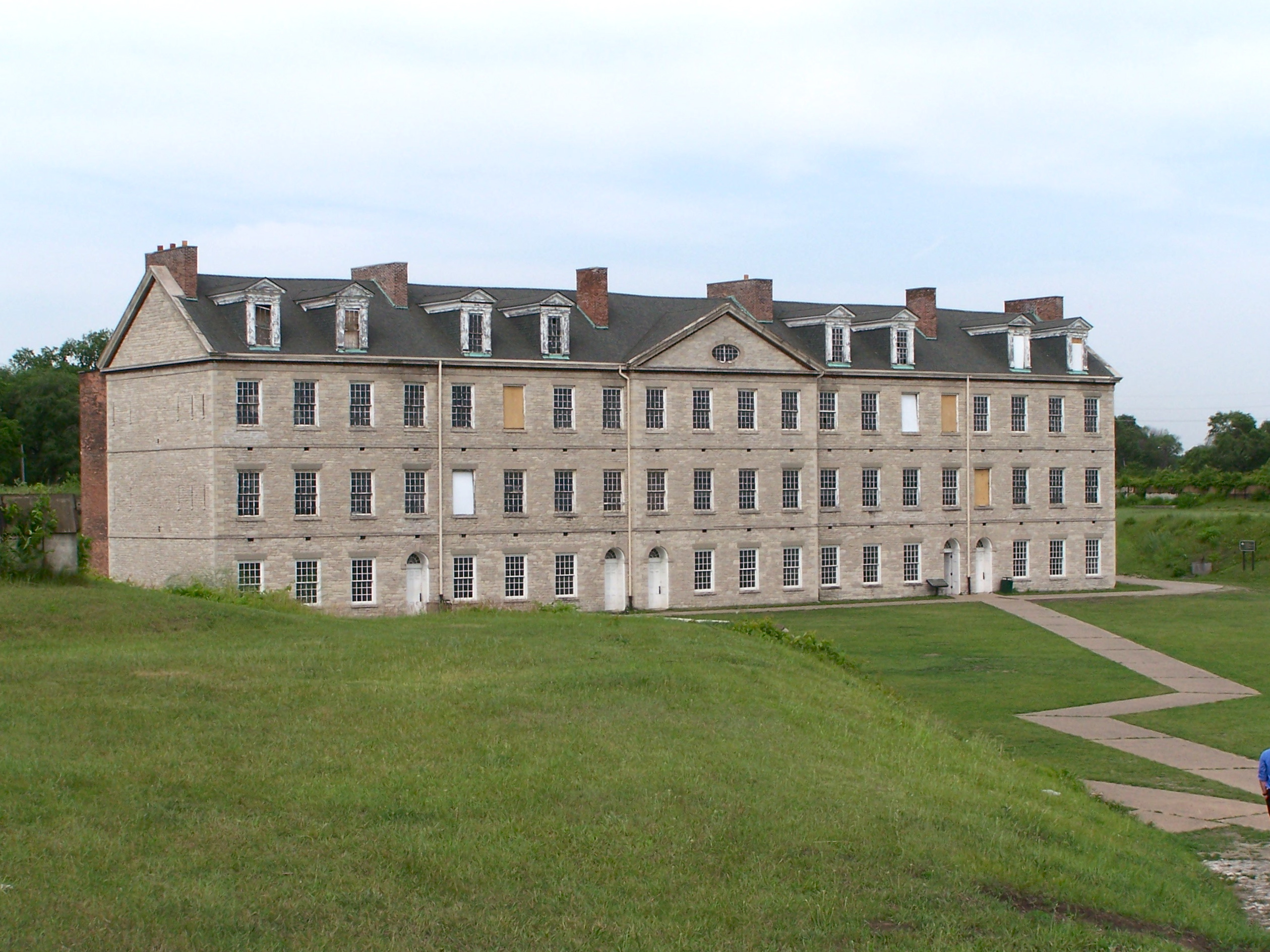
Barracks at Fort Wayne, one of the longest-lived bases in Michigan

Although the U.S. nominally controlled Michigan after the 1783 Treaty of Paris, several forts remained in British hands for more than a decade.

- Fort Lernoult, turned over to the Americans in 1796, renamed Fort Detroit, in British hands again during part of 1812–1813, renamed Fort Shelby, abandoned 1826
- Fort Mackinac, built in 1781, turned over to the Americans in 1796, captured in the War of 1812, it was again under British control from 1812 to 1815, closed 1895
- Fort Gratiot, built in 1814, finally abandoned 1879
- Fort Holmes, an inland blockhouse and redoubt built by the British as Fort Holmes on Mackinac Island during the War of 1812, renamed by Americans Fort Holmes but soon abandoned by the U.S. Army
- Grosse Ile Stockade, Grosse Ile, built 1815, closed 1819
- Fort Brady, Sault Saint Marie, built 1822, closed 1944 (except for an antiaircraft battery in place until 1962)
- Fort Saginaw, Saginaw, built 1822, abandoned 1824
- Detroit Arsenal, Dearborn, built 1832, sold off in 1877
- Fort Wayne, Detroit, built 1843, in use until the 1970s (the Army Corps of Engineers still maintains a boatdock here)

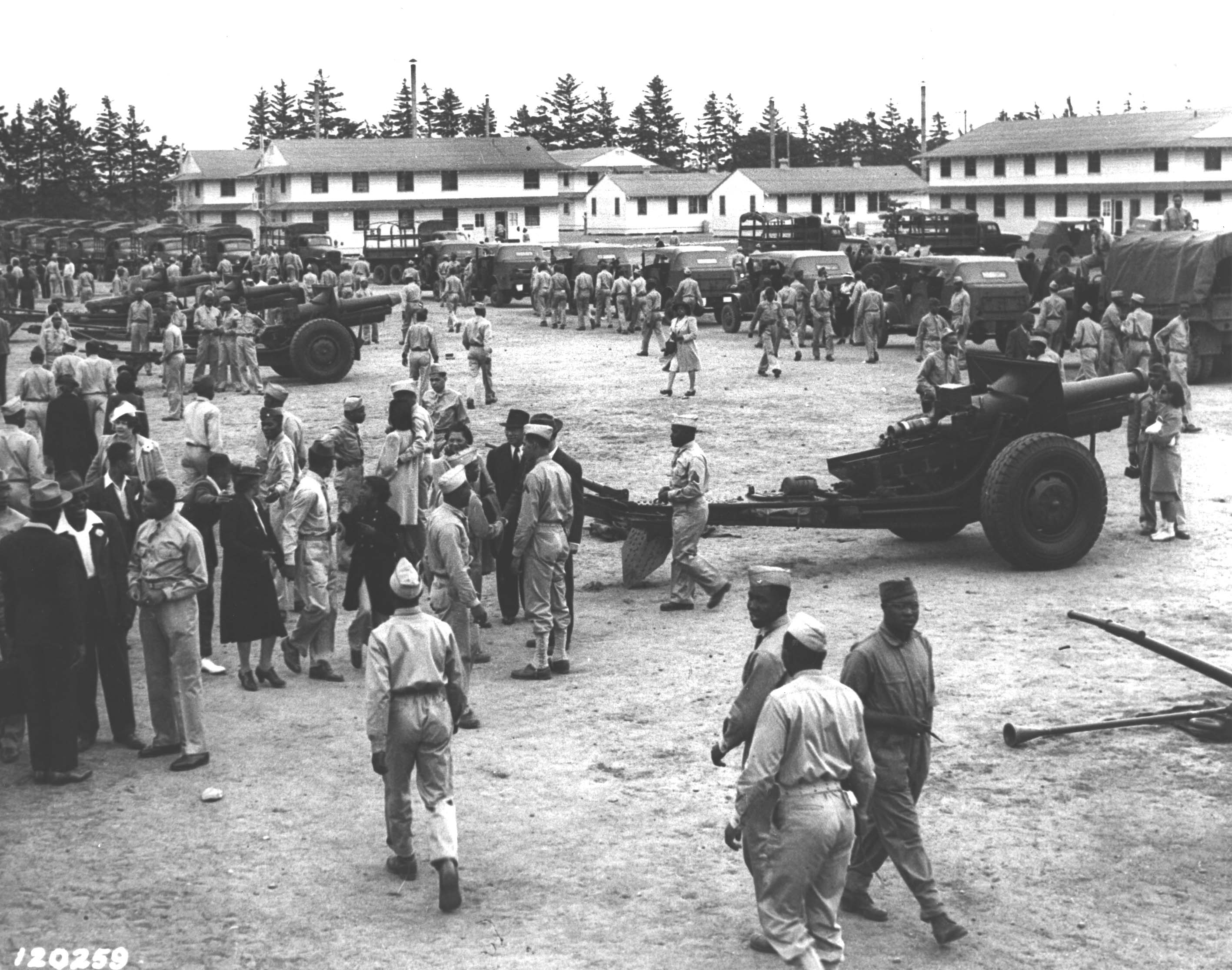
Fort Custer in 1941

- Fort Wilkins, Copper Harbor, built 1844, abandoned 1870
- Camp Butler, Mount Clemens, built 1861, closed 1865
- Camp Backus, Detroit, built 1862, dismantled about 1865
- Camp Lyon, Detroit, built 1861
- Camp Williams, Adrian, built 1861
- Camp Ward, Detroit, early 1860s
- Camp Eaton, Brighton, built 1898, closed 1900
- Camp Grayling, Grayling, built 1914, still in use
- Fort Custer, Battle Creek, built 1917, still in use

=== Air Force Bases and Naval Air Stations ===
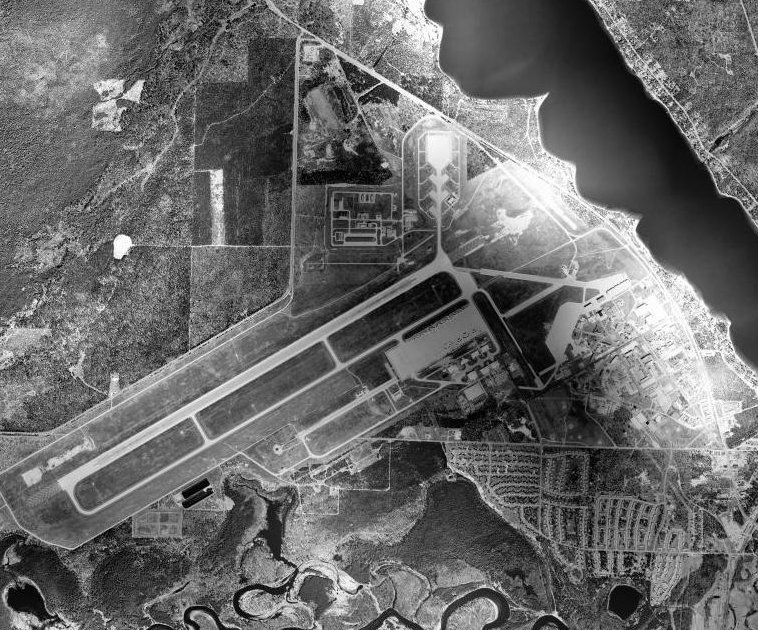
Wurtsmith Air Force Base was used to train Free French pilots in WWII and to house nuclear-armed B-52 bombers during the Cold War.

See also Michigan World War II Army Airfields.

Michigan's northern location made it a good site for several Cold War air bases, especially Strategic Air Command B-52 / KC-135 bases. Numerous other sites around the state had antiaircraft gun or missile installations during the Cold War.

- Camp Grayling, Grayling, built 1913, still in use
- Selfridge Air National Guard Base, Mount Clemens, built 1917, originally an Air Force Base, transferred to Air National Guard, still in use
- Wurtsmith Air Force Base, Oscoda, built 1923, closed 1993 per BRAC
- Naval Air Station Grosse Ile, built 1929, closed 1969
- Raco Air Force Station / Kincheloe AFB BOMARC Site, Raco, built 1940, closed 1972
- Kincheloe Air Force Base, Sault Ste. Marie, built 1941, closed 1977 as part of post-Vietnam force reductions (also called Kinross)
- K.I. Sawyer Air Force Base, Marquette County, built 1955, closed 1995 per BRAC
- Alpena Combat Readiness Training Center, still in use
- Battle Creek Air National Guard Base at W. K. Kellogg Airport, still in use
- Calumet Air Force Station, USAF radar installation
- Custer Air Force Station, USAF radar installation, built 1952, closed 1965
- Empire Air Force Station, built 1950, closed 1978
- Grand Marais Air Force Station, USAF radar installation, built 1954, closed 1957
- Port Austin Air Force Station, USAF radar installation, built 1951, closed 1988
- Willow Run Air Force Station, operated 1952-1959
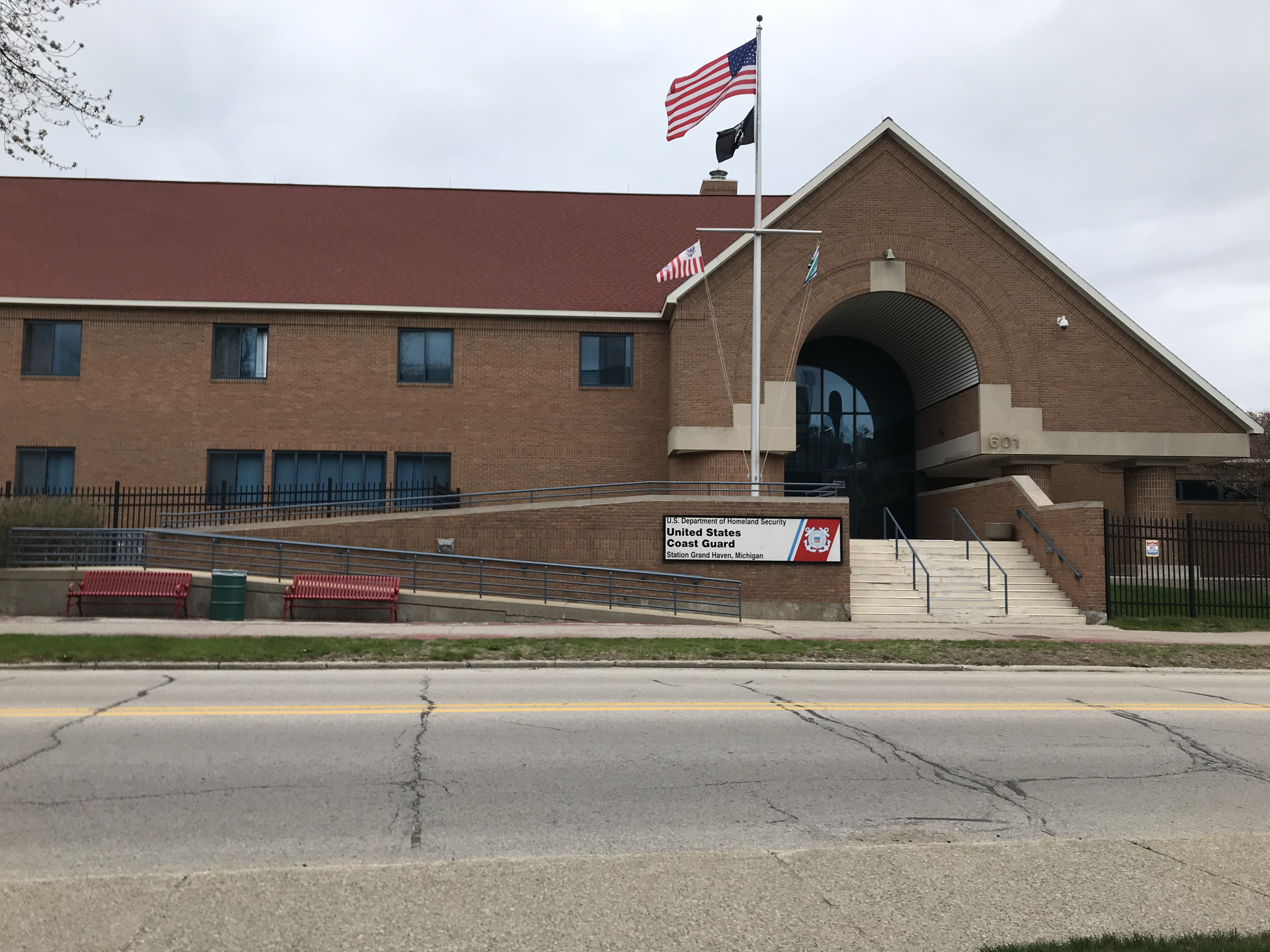
  Main Building at Station Grand Haven.

=== Other ===
- Detroit Arsenal Tank Plant, Warren, built 1940, under the United States Army Materiel Command
- Hart–Dole–Inouye Federal Center, Battle Creek, acquired 1942, a Defense Logistics Agency location
- Seafarer, at Republic, Michigan, built 1980, dismantled 2004, U.S. Navy submarine communication antenna site
- Station Grand Haven, US Coast Guard's District 9 Field Office

== See also ==
- Military in Michigan topics
- Military history of Michigan topics
