= Grosse Ile Municipal Airport =

Coordinates: 42°05′57″N 083°09′41″W

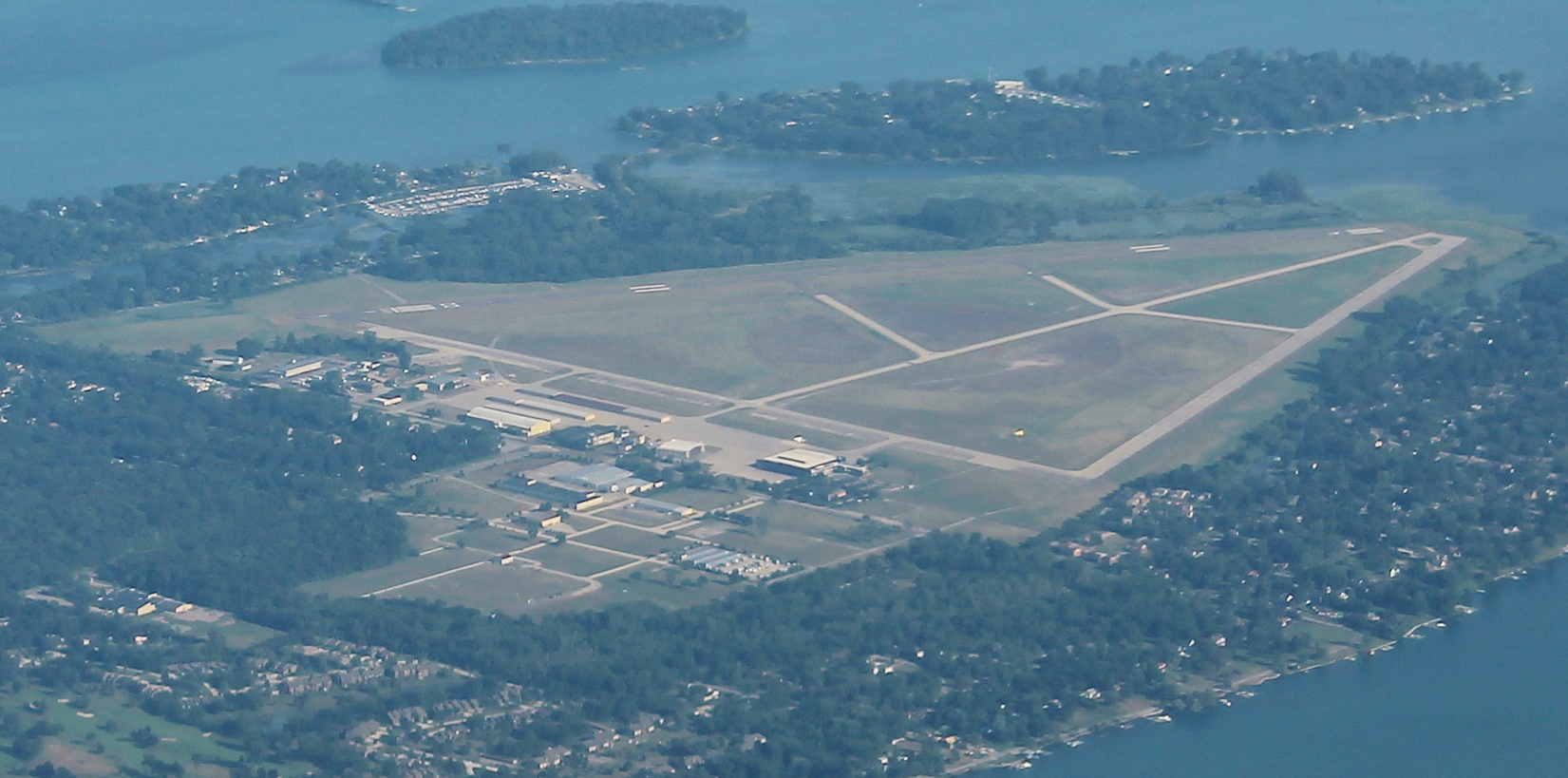
- IATA: none; ICAO: KONZ; FAA LID: ONZ

Summary
- Airport type: Public
- Owner: Township of Grosse Ile
- Serves: Grosse Ile Township, Michigan
- Elevation AMSL: 591 ft (180 m)

Map
- Location within Michigan Location within the United States

Runways
Direction	Length		Surface
Direction	ft	m	Surface
4/22	4,846	1,477	Concrete
17/35	4,425	1,349	Concrete

Statistics (2020)
- Aircraft operations: 16,000
- Based aircraft: 70
- Source: Federal Aviation Administration

Grosse Ile Municipal Airport (ICAO: KONZ, FAA LID: ONZ) is on Grosse Ile, in Wayne County, Michigan. It is owned by the Township of Grosse Ile. The Federal Aviation Administration (FAA) National Plan of Integrated Airport Systems for 2017–2021 categorized it as a local reliever airport facility.

Most U.S. airports use the same three-letter location identifier for the FAA and IATA, but Grosse Ile Municipal Airport is ONZ to the FAA and has no IATA code.

== History ==
In 1929 the airport opened as Naval Reserve Air Base Ile, with a training school, seaplane base, and dirigible hangar. In 1930 Thomas Towle used the hangars to build his Towle TA-3 diesel powered amphibian. Renamed as Naval Air Station Grosse Ile during World War II, the installation operated until 1969, when it was closed and turned over to the Township in 1971 for use as a general aviation airport. A memorial garden sits directly behind Township Hall, the former Hangar One, to honor the men and women who served in the armed forces at the Naval Air Station Grosse Ile.

On the evening of September 25, 2018 an EF1 tornado, one of a three tornado outbreak in the area, crossed the airfield at about 9:00 PM local time.

During World War II, George H. W. Bush got naval pilot training at the Naval Air Base. Bush finished his active Navy career at NASGI attached to Torpedo Squadron 153(VT-153), as did game show host Bob Barker.

In 2020, DBusiness Magazine named Grosse Ile as one of the Top Regional Airports for corporate aviation.

== Facilities ==
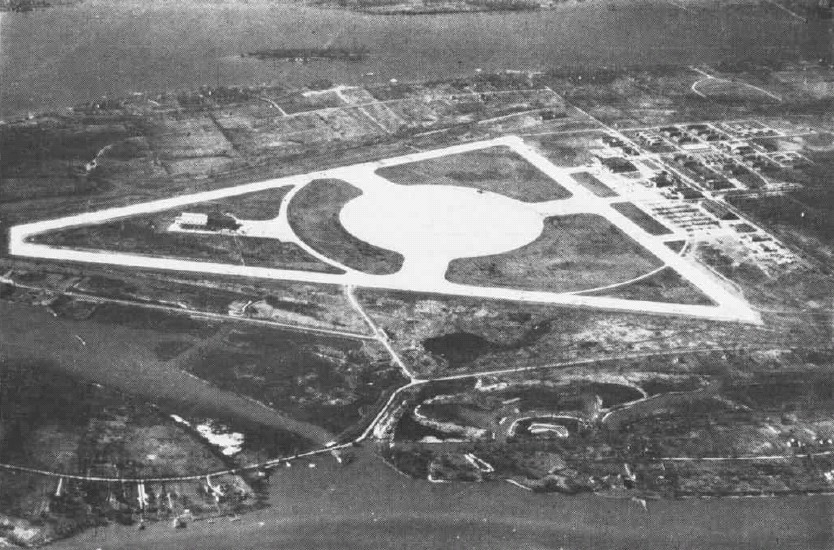
Naval Air Station Grosse Ile in the 1940s

The airport covers 607 acres (246 ha) and has two concrete runways: runway 4/22 measures 4,846 x 100 ft (1,477 x 30 m), and runway 17/35 measures 4,425 x 75 ft (1,349 x 23 m).

For the 12-month period ending December 31, 2020, the airport had 16,000 aircraft operations, or roughly 44 per day. All are general aviation. For the same time period, there are 70 aircraft based on the field: 57 single-engine and 9 multi-engine airplanes, 3 helicopters, and 1 jet.

The airport is reached by taking Jefferson Street to the Grosse Ile Parkway and turning right onto Meridian Road. Continue on Meridian Road and turn right onto Groh Road. Watch for the Township Hall sign on the left (about 200-250 yards), which marks the entrance to the parking lot. The airport offices are on the second floor.

The airport has a fixed-base operator offering fuel, aircraft parking, catering, courtesy cars, conference rooms, crew lounges, snooze rooms, showers, and more.

== Accidents and incidents ==
- On September 2, 1996, a Piper PA-28 Cherokee crashed while on initial climb out of Grosse Ile and subsequently impacted the river while en route to Jackson. Of the four onboard, the pilot and one passenger received serious injuries, and another two passengers received fatal injuries. Witnesses reported the aircraft appeared to be struggling to climb and then entered a steep left bank, losing altitude steadily until it impacted terrain. Other witnesses say they couldn't hear the engine running. The probable cause of the accident was found to be the pilot's exceeding the critical angle of bank required to maintain altitude.
- On July 11, 2002, a plane crashed into the Detroit River after takeoff from Grosse Ile. The U.S. Coast Guard rescued the two aboard, who were not injured.
- On June 23, 2011, a small plane crashed at Grosse Ile when its landing gear collapsed on landing. There was one pilot aboard.
- On July 11, 2020, an ultralight aircraft crashed into a residential area while operating at Grosse Ile Airport.

== See also ==
- List of airports in Michigan
- Naval Air Station Grosse Ile
