= Tomashevich =

Tomashevich or Tomashevych may refer to:

- Dmitri Lyudvigovich Tomashevich
- Dmitri Tomashevich
- George Vid Tomashevich
- Kirill Tomashevich
- Mikalai Dvornikau (Stanislav Tomashevich)

== See also ==
- Tomashevich Pegas, aircraft
