= I-166 =

I-166 may refer to:

- Prototype of the Polikarpov I-180 fighter aircraft
- Japanese submarine I-166, a Kaidai-class submarine
