= Towle TA-3 =

TA-3
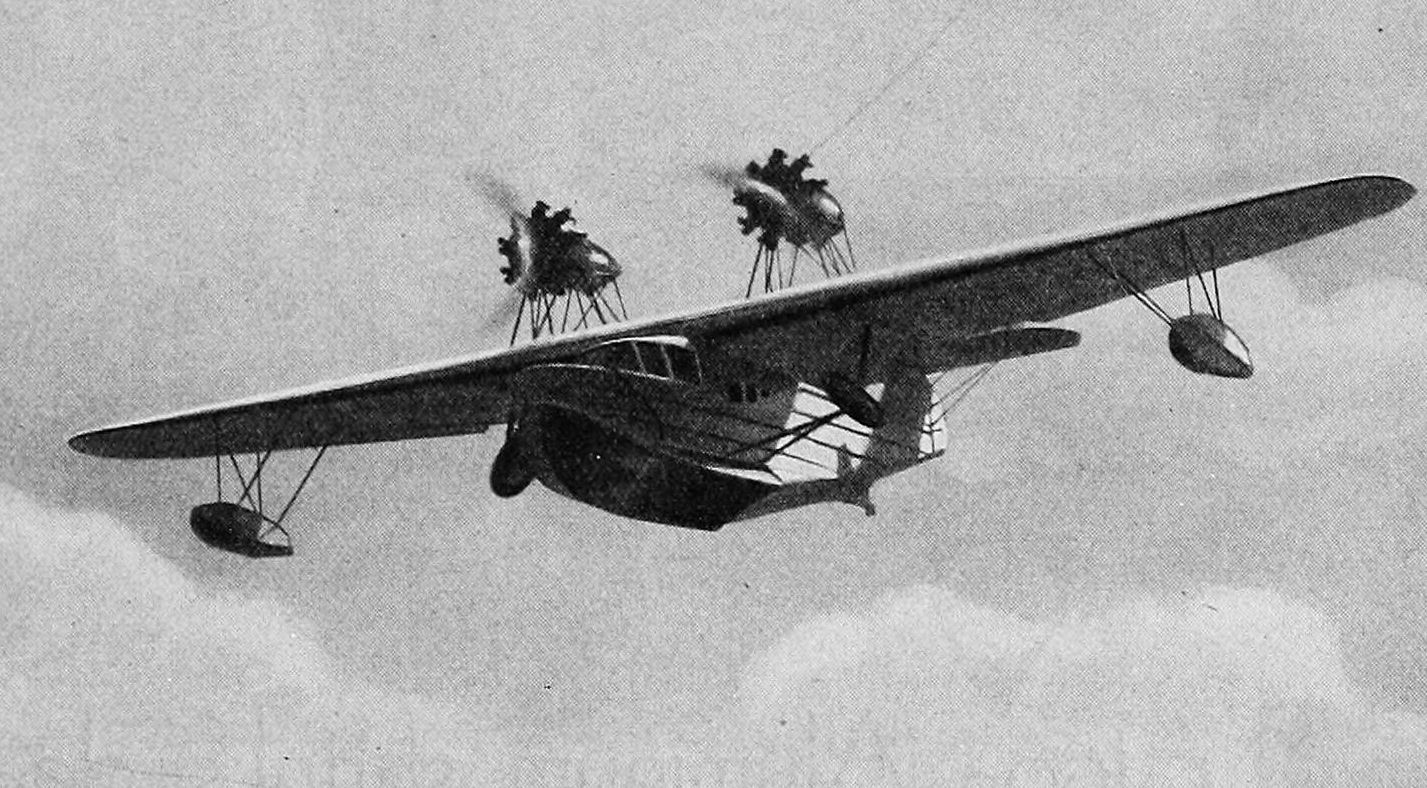

General information
- Type: Amphibious aircraft
- National origin: United States of America
- Manufacturer: Towle Aircraft Company
- Designer: Thomas Towle
- Number built: 1

History
- First flight: May 1930
- Developed from: Towle TA-2

The Towle TA-3 was an amphibious aircraft based on the Towle TA-2.

== Development ==
Thomas Towle was an engineer that had been involved with many early aircraft designs. Having just co-designed the Eastman E-2 Sea Rover. The TA-3 was a six-seat follow-on to the Towle TA-2 which crashed on its first flight. The wing from the TA-2 prototype was salvaged and reused on the TA-3.

== Design ==
The TA-3 featured two diesel radial engines on tall struts above the wings. Diesel engines were relatively new and were touted as being safer because they used a less volatile fuel than gasoline. The engines were provided on loan from the Packard Motor Car Company. The salvaged all-metal wing featured internal bracing based on the Ford Trimotor design that Towle had worked on previously. The tail used two rudders placed in the slipstream of the engines.

== Operational history ==
The prototype was built at Grosse Ile Municipal Airport and first flew in May 1930 piloted by George Pond. The prototype was leased to Kohler Airlines for two years before being flipped in a gear-down water landing in 1932. The aircraft was later sold and used in running liquor from the Bahamas to Florida during prohibition until it was destroyed in a storm at Bimini Island.

== Specifications (Towle TA-3) ==
Data from Michigan Aircraft Manufacturers, Jane's all the World's Aircraft 1931

General characteristics

- Crew: 2
- Capacity: 8 pax
- Length: 43 ft (13 m)
- Wingspan: 56 ft (17 m)
- Height: 13 ft (4.0 m)
- Wing area: 400 sq ft (37 m^{2})
- Empty weight: 3,943 lb (1,789 kg)
- Gross weight: 6,200 lb (2,812 kg)
- Powerplant: 2 × Packard DR-980 Radial, 225 hp (168 kW) each

Performance

- Maximum speed: 120 mph (190 km/h, 100 kn)
- Cruise speed: 100 mph (160 km/h, 87 kn)
- Range: 500 mi (800 km, 430 nmi)
- Service ceiling: 17,000 ft (5,200 m)
- Rate of climb: 800 ft/min (4.1 m/s)
- Wing loading: 15.28 lb/sq ft (74.6 kg/m^{2})
- Power/mass: 13.2 lb/hp (8.0 kg/kW)
