= Detroit ZMC-2 =

Metal skinned airship

ZMC-2
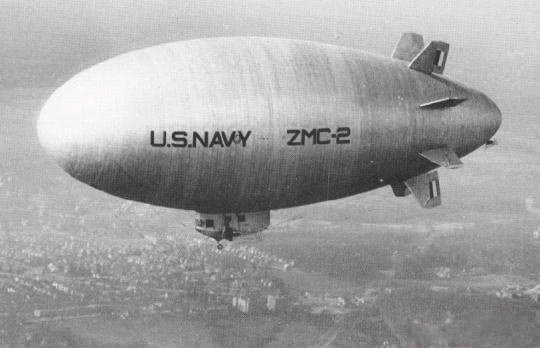

General information
- Type: Metal-clad airship
- National origin: United States
- Manufacturer: Detroit Aircraft Corporation
- Status: Scrapped
- Primary user: U.S. Navy
- Number built: 1

History
- Manufactured: 1926–29
- First flight: August 19, 1929
- Retired: 1941

The ZMC-2 (Zeppelin Metal Clad 200,000 cubic foot capacity) was the only successfully operated metal-skinned airship ever built. Constructed at Naval Air Station Grosse Ile by The Aircraft Development Corporation of Detroit, the ZMC-2 was operated by the United States Navy at Naval Air Station Lakehurst, New Jersey, from 1929 until its scrapping in 1941. While at Lakehurst it completed 752 flights, and logged 2265 hours of flight time.

== Operations ==
The airship was first flown on August 19, 1929, and transferred to Naval Air Station Lakehurst, New Jersey, in October 1929. The airship was nicknamed "the Tin Blimp". Its first Navy skipper was Red Dugan, who expressed reluctance at operating the airship, believing it unsafe. Dugan's concerns were proven wrong, though he later lost his life in the crash of another airship, Akron.

It was considered very successful as a sub-scale test vehicle, but the company that built it went bankrupt during the Great Depression, and by the time a successor might have been built, there was little interest in pursuing it. In the year before the Depression, the United States Army was seeking funding for an airship based on the ZMC-2, that would have been larger than the German Graf Zeppelin, and powered by eight engines of 600–800 hp (447–597 kW; 608–811 PS). The U.S. Army planned to use it as a tender for air-launched aircraft, similar to plans the U.S. Navy had for future dirigibles. The $4.5 million need for construction was never approved by Congress.

The ZMC-2 was operated with a zero internal pressure at speeds up to 20 miles per hour (32 km/h), sufficient for it to be considered a 'rigid' airship. With its low fineness ratio of 2.83, the ZMC-2 was difficult to fly. By 1936, the airship had travelled over 80,000 miles (130,000 km) with little sign of corrosion. In its lifetime the ZMC-2 logged 752 flights and 2265 hours of flight time. In its final years its use had dropped significantly. Between December 1938 and April 1941 it only logged five hours of flight time.

Considered by the Navy as too small for anti-submarine patrols, the aging ZMC-2 was decommissioned and scrapped in 1941 after nearly 12 years of service.

== Operators ==
United States

- United States Navy

== Specifications (ZMC-2) ==
General characteristics

- Crew: 2
- Capacity: 750 lb (340 kg) payload
- Length: 148 ft 11 in (45.4 m)
- Diameter: 53 ft 2 in (16.2 m)
- Height: 64 ft 6 in (19.66 m)
- Volume: 200,100 cu ft (5,667 m^{3})
- Useful lift: 12,868 lb (5,837 kg)
- Powerplant: 2 × Wright J-5 Whirlwind 9-cyl. air-cooled radial piston engines, 220 hp (160 kW) each

Performance

- Maximum speed: 70 mph (112 km/h, 60 kn)
- Range: 675 mi (1,087 km, 587 nmi)

== ZMC-2 in popular culture ==
The ZMC-2 plays a key role in the Clive Cussler novel Cyclops (1986) in which it is fictionally saved from scrapping and renamed Prosperteer.

== See also ==
- List of airships of the United States Navy
- David Schwarz
- ZMC (airship)
