= Fairchild FB-3 =

FB-3

General information
- Type: Flying boat
- National origin: United States
- Manufacturer: Fairchild Metal Boat Division
- Number built: 1

History
- Introduction date: 1929

The Fairchild FB-3 (Flying Boat number 3) was an all-metal flying boat developed by the new Fairchild Metal Boat Division of the Fairchild Aircraft Corporation. The aircraft did not go into production.

== Design and development ==
The prototype was built at Fairchild's Farmingdale, Long Island facility. The FB-3 was an amphibious high-wing strut-braced monoplane with retractable landing gear, powered by a high pylon-mounted pusher configuration radial engine. The two-step hull provided flotation with two outboard floats for stability. The wings had metal spars and ribs with fabric covering. The interior was well finished for its time.

== Operational history ==
The prototype aircraft (NX7385) was test flown in 1929 but did go into production.

== Specifications (Fairchild FB-3) ==
Data from Fairchild Aircraft

General characteristics

- Crew: one
- Capacity: four
- Length: 41 ft (12 m)
- Wingspan: 52 ft (16 m)
- Powerplant: 1 × Pratt & Whitney R-1340 Wasp Radial, 420 hp (310 kW)

Performance

- Maximum speed: 110 kn (130 mph, 210 km/h)
- Cruise speed: 100 kn (115 mph, 185 km/h)
- Range: 560 nmi (650 mi, 1,050 km)

== See also ==
Aircraft of comparable role, configuration, and era

- Towle WC
