= Dmitri Lyudvigovich Tomashevich =

Soviet engineer (1899–1974)

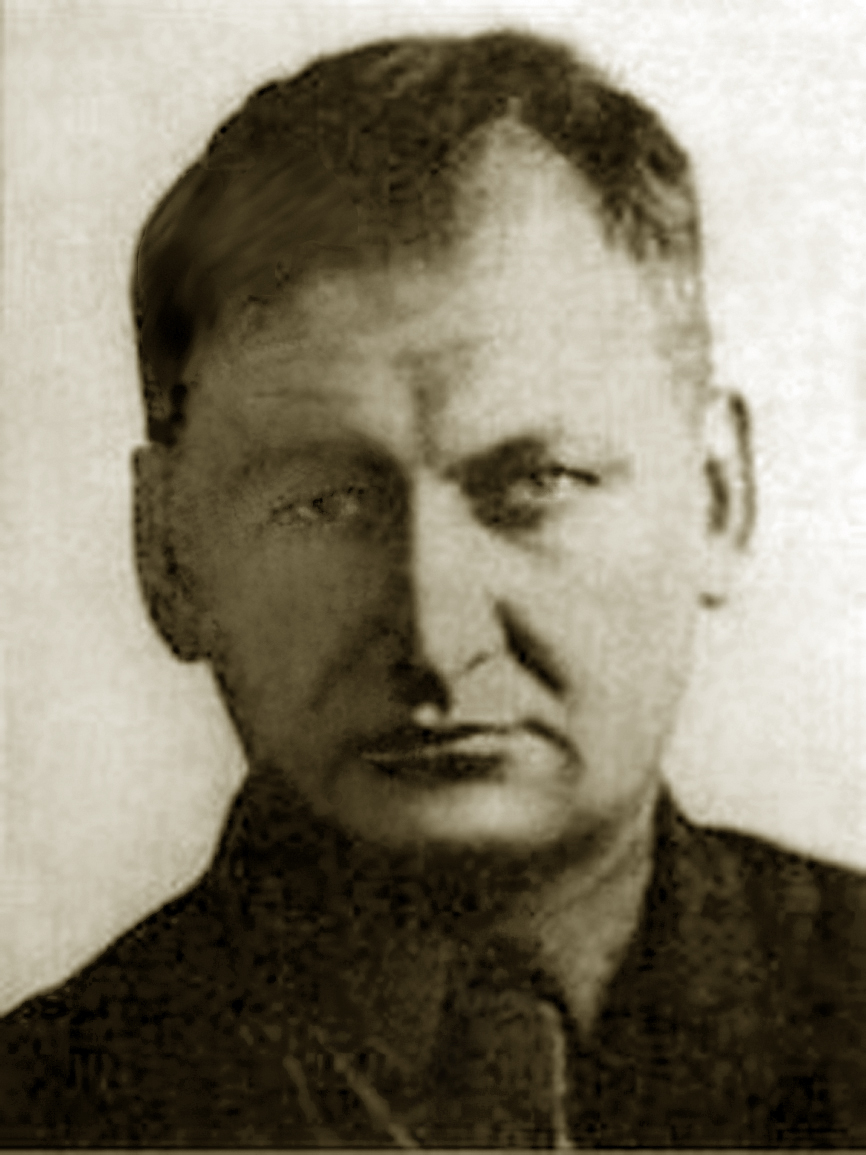
- Born: October 9, 1899; Rokytne, Kyiv Oblast, Russian Empire
- Died: August 7, 1974 (aged 74); Moscow, Soviet Union
- Occupations: Aircraft engineer & designer
- Years active: 1922–1974
- Known for: Polikarpov I-180, S-75 Dvina
- Notable work: "Economic construction of Aircraft" and "Fundamentals of the design of unmanned aerial vehicles."

Dmitri Lyudvigovich Tomashevich (Russian: Дмитрий Людвигович Томашевич, Ukrainian: Дмитро Людвігович Томашевич, romanized: Dmytro Liudvihovych Tomashevych; 9 October [O.S. 27 September] 1899 – 7 August 1974) was a pioneering Soviet aircraft and rocket designer, somewhat infamous as the chief designer of the Polikarpov I-180 fighter - the prototype of which crashed, killing its test pilot Valery Chkalov. Today he is less well known than his achievements deserve, in part because of the secret nature of much of his work.

== Early life and education ==
Tomashevich was born into a noble - but impoverished - family on 27 September 1899, in the town of Rokitnoe near Kyiv (Kiev). On leaving school in 1918 he entered St. Vladimir University in Kyiv (now known as the Taras Shevchenko National University of Kyiv), but his studies were soon terminated by the political turmoil of the time.

Needing to support himself he returned to Rokitnoe, where he found work as a mechanic at the Siniavskyi sugar factory. There, in October 1920, he lost his right eye in an accident. By 1922, however, he had worked long enough to qualify for entry as a "non-proletariat" student in the Locomotive Department of the Kyiv Polytechnic Institute (now known as the Igor Sikorsky Kyiv Polytechnic Institute). His arrival coincided with an upsurge in the institute's interest in aviation, marked by the opening of the Aircraft Construction Faculty - the starting point for many Soviet aircraft designers (including Alexander Mikulin, Dmitry Pavlovich Grigorovich, Konstantin Kalinin, Sergei Korolev and Alexei Gratsianskyi). Initially the Faculty designed gliders - which they named "KPIR" - with some success: KPIR-1 recorded a flight of 4.25 hours to come third in the 1924 All Union glider competition. In 1925 Tomashevych designed KPIR-5 as his graduation project, which went on to win.

== Aircraft designer ==
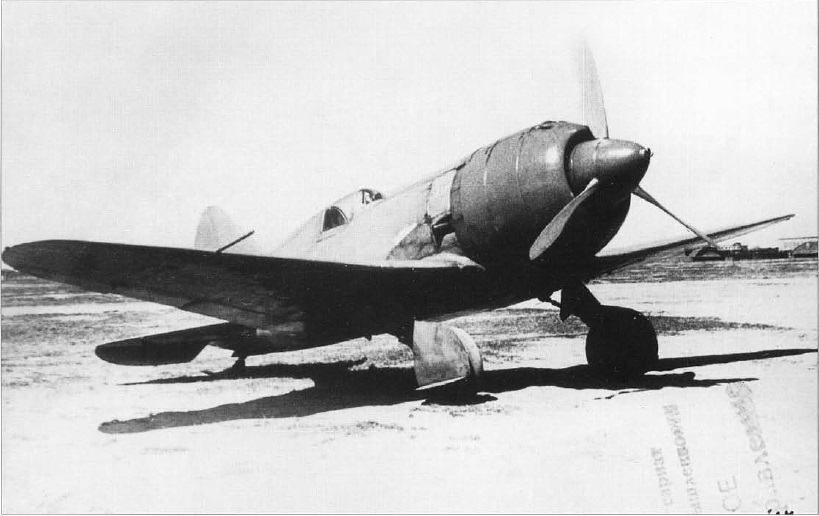
I-180 Prototype #3

After graduating Tomashevich went to work at the nearby "Remvozduh-6" (Aircraft Repair Plant No.6, now known as the Antonov Serial Production Plant) - who were already cooperating closely with the institute. This is where the KPIR-5 was actually built: it flew successfully for several years afterwards. In 1929 he (together with M. Zhemchuzhin) designed and built the glider "Grif", which broke two national records (rising by more than 1500m and flying 35 miles). The main business of the plant was, as the name implies, repairing aircraft, for both the military and civilian customers. Tomashevich rapidly rose to be in charge of evaluating proposed improvements to aircraft in for repair. Very soon after he was transferred to Moscow as the head of the technical department of the aircraft repair sector. His responsibilities now included organisational issues concerning aircraft repairs. This did not last long: following re-organisation, Tomashevich became responsible for overseeing the production of the Polikarpov R-5 - a job that eventually led to him meeting its designer, Nikolai Polikarpov. At the time Polikarpov was a convicted counter-revolutionary' (and under sentence of death) and was working from an NKVD-run Special Prison. Despite this, Tomashevich was able to collaborate on his projects - contributing substantially to the design of the Polikarpov I-15. This involvement continued throughout the development of this aircraft family - notably the I-153, where he developed the retracting undercarriage: one of the first production fighters to feature this innovation. Tomashevich was also involved in the design of the famous I-16: one of the first mass-produced cantilever monoplane fighters. Tomashevich's talents had not gone unnoticed. During the development of the I-17 he was promoted: first to Team Leader, then to Deputy to The Chief Structural Engineer. Following this he was involved in the design of several new types which did not progress to flight, in large part because the facility moved twice during the period 1933-38: first to the Factory #84 in Khimki and then to Air Factory #156 (now Tupolev).

Following the relocations, Polikarpov was requested to design a new fighter. Tomashevich was made chief designer for the project, which resulted in the Polikarpov I-180. Despite being an outstanding design, poor workmanship in construction (and, it is rumoured, sabotage) resulted in the prototype crashing, killing its test pilot Valery Chkalov. As Chkalov was a Hero of the Soviet Union, this resulted in Tomashevich being arrested and, in January 1939, being sent to "Special Prison" Zavod 156 (also known as Z.156 or TsKB-29), where he assisted Andrei Tupolev in the design of the Tupolev Tu-2. Tomashevich's group was called "110" – and this became the name of his first solo project there, a single engined high-altitude fighter'. A prototype flew in late 1942, but was not produced.

In July 1941, Tomashevich was released and in August evacuated to CDB-29 in Omsk, Siberia where he was put in charge of his own design bureau. There he designed the Tomashevich Pegas, a simple twin-engined ground-attack aeroplane – of which four (some sources state five) prototypes were built. Generally felt to be under-powered, it did not go into production.

In 1943 Tomashevich was transferred to the production plant for the Petlyakov Pe-2, where he oversaw modifications to the design. This lasted less than a year before he was again transferred, this time to Moscow Plant #51. Here he took over the projects for the I-187 (a development of the Polikarpov I-185, itself a development of the I-180) and the “Malutca” rocket interceptor. Later that year work started on project 10Kh (sometimes translated as "10X") - an unmanned flying bomb, not unlike the German V-1 - although the 10Kh was designed to be air-launched only. Arguments over the design of the 10Kh between Tomashevich and project director Vladimir Chelomey lead to Tomashevich leaving in 1947, to teach full time at the Zhukovsky Air Force Engineering Academy (he had been a member since 1944 and Reader in the Airframe Engineering Department since 1946).

== Academic life and rocketry ==
The academy was very active in the new field of guided rocketry: one of its early projects was the study of the Henschel Hs 293. A Soviet version, the KB-2, was tested from a Tupolev TU-2D fitted with the German "Kehl-Strassburg" radio guidance system. The results were not good and the project was abandoned. There were numerous other projects - the most notable of which was the "Cometa" - an "aircraft-like" (in modern parlance, "cruise missile") anti-ship missile with a range of 100 km. This system was designed by Tomashevich, in his new role of head of "Department Number 32", and was awarded the Stalin Prize in 1953. In 1956 Tomashevich was - belatedly - exonerated of guilt in the matter of the I-180 crash.

Another area of interest was air defence. The Soviet Union had experimented with technologies to try and boost the range of their anti-aircraft artillery, in an attempt to counter the threat posed by high-altitude bombers such as the Boeing B-29 Superfortress. It soon became obvious that this was not a productive way forward, and attention switched to guided surface-air-missiles. Tomashevich and his Department Number 32 (sometimes referred to as SHB or 32B when related to rocketry) designed a number of systems, including "Berkut" (S-25) and the B-750 (1D) anti-aircraft missile system, that went into service as the S-75 Dvina (better known in the West as the "SA-2 Guideline"). It was this system that, on 7 October 1959, became the first guided missile to down an enemy aircraft. A few months later, on 1 May 1960, an S-75 shot down the Lockheed U-2 flown by Gary Powers.

Now a respected academic, Tomashevich gave lectures and wrote books, notably "Economic construction of Aircraft" (1960) and "Fundamentals of the design of unmanned aerial vehicles." (1962).

But he never stopped his practical work. Switching his attention to anti-tank missiles, he designed the 3M7 Drakon (Dragon) missile system. Despite only limited use, in 1968 this resulted in another USSR State Prize (the new name for The Stalin Prize).

== Death ==
Dmitri Lyudvigovich Tomashevich, having survived both World Wars, the Russian Revolutions and the regimes of Nicholas II of Russia, Stalin and Beria, died in a car accident on 7 August 1974.
