= Eastman E-2 Sea Rover =

E-2 Sea Rover
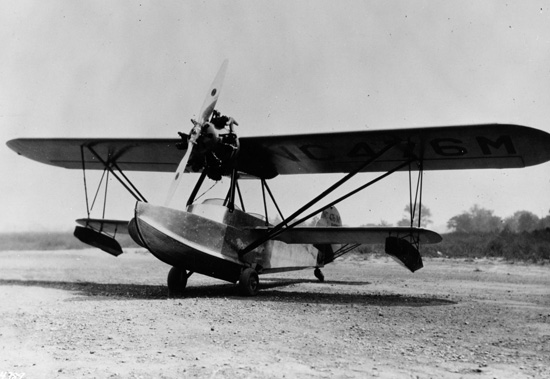

General information
- Type: Seaplane
- National origin: America
- Manufacturer: Eastman Aircraft Corporation
- Designer: Thomas Towle
- Number built: 18

History
- First flight: 1928

The Eastman E-2 Sea Rover, also called the Beasley-Eastman E-2 Sea Rover, was a light seaplane built in the late 1920s for business and shuttle use.

== Development ==
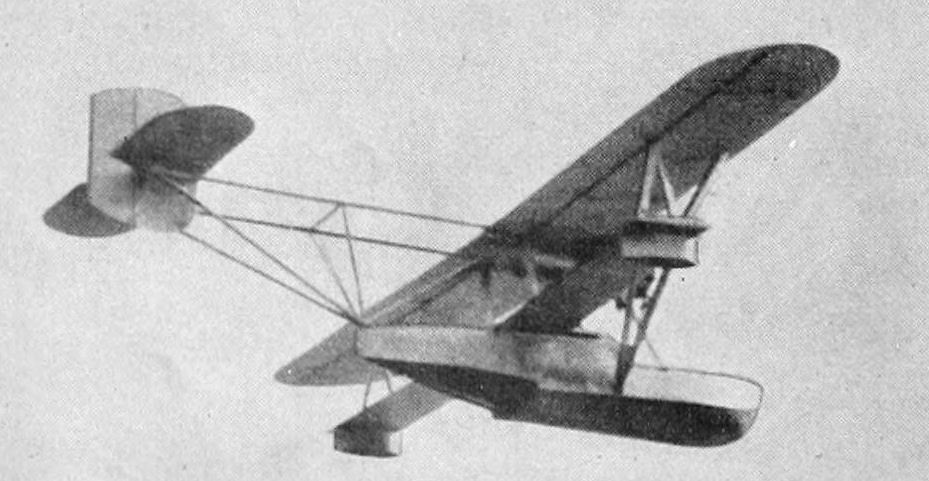
Beasley-Eastman flying boat photo from Aero Digest April 1928

The E-2 was designed by former Ford engineer Thomas Towle for industrialist Jim Eastman of Eastman Laboratories. Towle was in the process of starting his own company, the Towle Marine Aircraft Engineering to produce his twin-engine amphibian design, the Towle WC. Eastman founded the Eastman Aircraft Corporation of Detroit to build the E-2

The prototype E-2 was flown with a single 90 hp (67 kW) Anzani 6 engine. The production model was outfitted with a 120 hp (89 kW) Warner Scarab. The E-2 received type certificate #338 on 17 July 1930 By the end of 1929 Eastman Aircraft had been merged into the Detroit Aircraft Corporation.

== Design ==
The E-2 used a wooden hull with aluminium cladding. The aircraft used a parasol wing supported by large V-struts with secondary lower shoulder wings with tip floats at the ends. The single engine was mounted in the center of the wing root of the upper wing with a rear teardrop fairing.

== Variants ==
E-2 Sea Rover
Flying boat powered variously by, 90 hp (67 kW) Anzani 6, 120 hp (89 kW) Warner Scarab and other engines of similar power. Eighteen aircraft were built
E-2A Sea Pirate
Two E-2 flying boats converted to amphibians, powered by 185 hp (138 kW) Curtiss Challenger engines.
E-2D Sea Pirate
A single E-2 flying boat, converted to amphibian, powered by a 225 hp (168 kW) Packard DR-980 diesel radial engine.

== Operators ==
- Gorst Air Transport operated one E-2 from 1929-1930.

== Aircraft on display ==
An E-2 is on display at the British Columbia Aviation Museum. It is a composite made up of the wreckages three E-2s recovered throughout British Columbia.

== Specifications (Eastman E-2 Sea Rover) ==
Data from American flying boats and amphibious aircraft, Jane's all the World's Aircraft 1928

General characteristics

- Crew: 2
- Length: 26 ft 3 in (8.00 m)
- Upper wingspan: 34 ft (10 m)
- Lower wingspan: 22 ft (6.7 m)
- Height: 8 ft (2.4 m)
- Wing area: 243 sq ft (22.6 m^{2})
- Airfoil: Clark Y
- Empty weight: 980 lb (445 kg)
- Gross weight: 1,500 lb (680 kg)
- Fuel capacity: 25 US gal (21 imp gal; 95 L) fuel; 3 US gal (2.5 imp gal; 11 L)
- Powerplant: 1 × Warner Scarab 7-cylinder air-cooled radial piston engine, 120 hp (89 kW)

Performance

- Maximum speed: 110 mph (180 km/h, 96 kn)
- Cruise speed: 90 mph (140 km/h, 78 kn)
- Range: 360 mi (580 km, 310 nmi)
- Wing loading: 6.6 lb/sq ft (32 kg/m^{2})
- Power/mass: 0.0538 hp/lb (0.0884 kW/kg)

== Bibliography ==
- Grant, Robert S. (July–August 2002). "There's Gold in Them Thar Hill... or is There?: The Mitchell Expedition of 1932". Air Enthusiast. No. 100. pp. 50–55. ISSN 0143-5450.
