= Towle TA-2 =

Amphibious aircraft

TA-2

General information
- Type: Amphibious aircraft
- National origin: United States of America
- Manufacturer: Towle Aircraft Company
- Designer: Thomas Towle

History
- Introduction date: 1929
- First flight: 7 November 1929
- Developed from: Towle WC

The Towle TA-2 was an amphibious aircraft based on the Towle WC built for a 1929 round-the world flight.

== Development ==
Thomas Towle was an engineer that had been involved with many early aircraft designs. Having just co-designed the Eastman E-2 Sea Rover and the Towle WC, Towle found funding to create a new entity, the Towle Aircraft Company to produce the TA-2.

== Design ==
The TA-2 featured a corrugated aluminum hull. The wings were all metal with internal stiffeners, rather than ribs, based loosely on the Ford Trimotor, which Towle worked on previously. The twin Wright R-540 engines sat on small pylons on top of the shoulder mounted wing. Two floats were mounted directly below the engine pylons which incorporated the hydraulically actuated landing gear. The prototype was originally designed for 165 hp Wright 540 engines.

== Operational history ==
The TA-2 was tested in Lake St. Clair on 7 November 1929 by test pilot George Pond and James Bradley. It broke up on takeoff and sank to the bottom of the lake. The aircraft appears to have been rebuilt as a Towle TA-2 and was reported to have visited Lympne Airport, Kent, United Kingdom in February 1930. The wing from the prototype was salvaged and used on the next iteration, the Towle TA-3.

== Variants ==
- Towle WC The basis for the TA-2

== Specifications ==
Data from Flight, 14 February 1930, pp215-16.

General characteristics

- Crew: 1
- Capacity: 5 passengers
- Length: 33 ft (10 m)
- Wingspan: 47 ft 9 in (14.55 m)
- Wing area: 292 sq ft (27.1 m^{2})
- Gross weight: 4,420 lb (2,005 kg)
- Fuel capacity: 90 US gallons (340 L; 75 imp gal)
- Powerplant: 2 × Wright R-540 radial, 165 hp (123 kW) each
- Propellers: 2-bladed

Performance

- Maximum speed: 117 kn (135 mph, 217 km/h)
- Range: 600 nmi (690 mi, 1,100 km)
- Wing loading: 15.15 lb/sq ft (74.0 kg/m^{2})

== See also ==
- Saro Cutty Sark, British amphibious aircraft
