= Tomashevich Pegas =

Attack plane

Pegas
- The nose of Pegas-04 (the fourth prototype)

General information
- Type: Ground attack aircraft
- National origin: Soviet Union
- Manufacturer: Tomashevich
- Status: Prototypes only
- Number built: 4

History
- First flight: 1942

The Tomashevich Pegas was a World War II Soviet ground attack prototype aircraft built before the Battle of Kursk (1943), designed to destroy tanks and German vehicles.

== Development and design ==
Dmitri Lyudvigovich Tomashevich was the chief designer on the Polikarpov I-180 fighter before the crash of the prototype, killing test pilot Valery Chkalov, led to Tomashevich being arrested and sent to a NKVD-run Special Prison in January 1939, where he assisted Andrei Tupolev in the design of the Tupolev Tu-2.

In August 1941, Tomashevich was evacuated to Omsk in Siberia where he was put in charge of his own design bureau. In 1942, inspired by the success of the simple Polikarpov Po-2 biplane as a night ground-attack aircraft, Tomashyevich was authorised to design and build a simple ground-attack aircraft that would be much more capable than the Po-2 but could be built at the same price.

The resulting design was a low-wing monoplane with a fixed tail-wheel undercarriage, of wooden construction, with pine frames and birch plywood skins. The pilot sat in an open cockpit which was protected by mild-steel armour plating designed to withstand 12.7 mm (0.50 in) bullets. It was powered by two Shvetsov M-11F engines (the same powerplant used by the Po-2) and was armed with two 23 mm (0.906 in) cannon and a heavy machine gun in the nose, with the option of replacing the cannon with up to 500 kg (1,102.311 lb) of bombs. An optional jettisonable upper wing was tested on the Pegas-01 prototype.

The first prototype, Pegas-01, made its maiden flight in late 1942, proving to be overweight and underpowered, although the aircraft's handling was acceptable. It was hoped to test one of the prototypes at the Kursk front, but the distance from Omsk to the front line made that impractical, and development of the type was abandoned after four prototypes had been built.

== Specifications ==
Data from Russian Aircraft since 1940, The Osprey Encyclopaedia of Russian Aircraft 1875–1995

General characteristics

- Crew: 1
- Length: 8.72 m (28 ft 7 in)
- Wingspan: 16.63 m (54 ft 7 in)
- Wing area: 26.6 m^{2} (286 sq ft)
- Empty weight: 1,800 kg (3,968 lb)
- Gross weight: 2,150 kg (4,740 lb)
- Max takeoff weight: 2,820 kg (6,217 lb) including 500 kg (1,100 lb) of bombs
- Powerplant: 2 × Shvetsov M-11F 5-cylinder air-cooled radial engine, 100 kW (140 hp) each

Performance

- Maximum speed: 172 km/h (107 mph, 93 kn) at sea level
- Range: 400 km (250 mi, 220 nmi)
- Service ceiling: 2,620 m (8,600 ft)
- Rate of climb: 2 m/s (390 ft/min)
- Time to altitude: 3.5 min to 1,000 m (3,300 ft)

Armament

- 1 × 12.7 mm (0.50 in) Berezin UBS machine gun and
- 2 × 23 mm (0.906 in) Volkov-Yartsev VYa-23 cannon or
- 500 kg (1,100 lb) of bombs
