= Polikarpov I-185 =

Soviet fighter aircraft designed in 1940

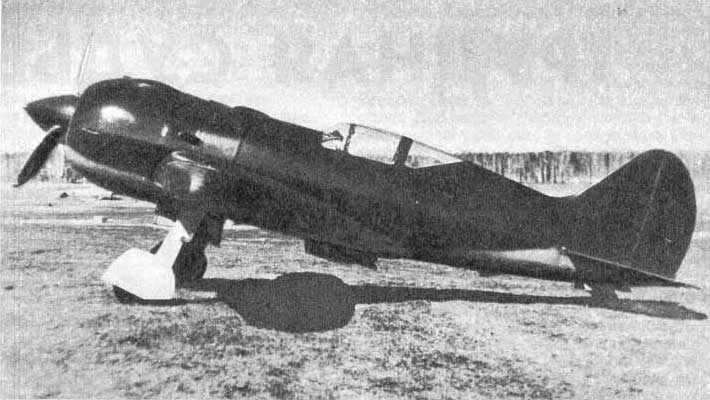
- Side view of the I-185 with a M-71 engine

General information
- Type: Fighter
- National origin: Soviet Union
- Manufacturer: Polikarpov
- Status: Cancelled
- Number built: 4

History
- First flight: 11 January 1941
- Developed from: Polikarpov I-180

The Polikarpov I-185 was a Soviet fighter aircraft designed in 1940. It was flown with three different engines that were either insufficiently developed or reserved for other fighters already in production. Engines used with the I-185 included the Shvetsov M-71 and, in a few planes, the Shvetsov M-82 that powered the Lavochkin La-5 fighters. The I-185 program was cancelled on 27 January 1943.

== Design and development ==
The I-185, designed in early 1940, was based on the I-180, which was itself a development of the I-16, but was virtually a new design. The monocoque fuselage was similarly built of 'shpon', molded birch plywood, and also had an integral fin, but it was considerably longer than that of the I-180. The two-spar, all-metal wing was smaller and thinner than the I-180's wing, nearly as thin as the Supermarine Spitfire's wing at 13% at the root and tapered to 8% at the wing tip. The wing had a NACA-230 profile and was skinned in duralumin. Pneumatically powered split flaps and leading edge slats were fitted. The outer wing panels had 3° of dihedral. The fabric-covered control surfaces were framed in duralumin. The protected 540-litre (119 imp gal; 143 US gal) fuel tanks were mounted between the wing center section spars. The I-185 had conventional landing gear with a retractable tailwheel. The unproven 1,492 kW (2,000 hp) 18-cylinder, two-row Tumansky M-90 radial engine was carried on welded steel tubes. It was fitted with a ducted spinner to improve cooling with the air expelled through gills as in the I-180 to provide additional thrust. The synchronized armament was mounted in the fuselage: two 7.62 mm (0.300 in) ShKAS machine guns and two 12.7 mm (0.50 in) Berezin UBS machine guns. A 500-kilogram (1,100 lb) bomb could be carried under overload conditions. The first prototype was completed in May 1940, but the only available example of the M-90 did not provide enough power for take-off. The prototype was modified to use another experimental engine, the 895-kilowatt (1,200 hp) Shvetsov M-81 radial, but this was not nearly powerful enough for flight tests. The I-185 (M-81) finally took to the air on January 11, 1941, but it was decided not to waste further development and await a more powerful engine which was fortunate as the M-81 was cancelled in May 1941.

A second prototype was completed at the end of 1940 with a 14-cylinder, 1,268 kW (1,700 hp) Shvetsov M-82A radial engine. The forward fuselage had to be redesigned to accommodate the slimmer engine and the armament was revised to three synchronized 20 mm (0.79 in) ShVAK cannon. The drawings for this engine installation was passed to Lavochkin and Yakovlev where they proved very useful in designing their own fighters using the M-82 engine, notably the Lavochkin La-5. A third prototype was also built that used the larger and heavier Shvetsov M-71 radial engine of 1,492 kW (2,000 hp). The flight tests of both of the latter versions were interrupted by the German invasion in June 1941 and all three prototypes, along with the entire Polikarpov design bureau, were evacuated to Novosibirsk.

Flight testing resumed in early 1942 and the M-71-powered versions, which now included the re-engined first prototype, proved to be faster than the Messerschmitt Bf 109F by 47 km/h (29 mph) at sea level and 20 km/h (12 mph) at 6,000 metres (19,685 ft) with a top speed of 630 km/h (390 mph) at that altitude. It was recommended for immediate production, even before it began combat trials in November 1942. All three aircraft were assigned to the 728th Fighter Aviation Regiment of the 3rd Air Army of the Kalinin Front and were tightly controlled to prevent the loss of the prototypes. For example, all sorties had to be flown over Soviet-controlled territory and required the express permission of the 3rd Air Army staff to fly. Pilots' reports were quite enthusiastic; the 728th's commander, Captain Vasilyaka wrote: "The I-185 outclasses both Soviet and foreign aircraft in level speed. It performs aerobatic maneuvers easily, rapidly, and vigorously. The I-185 is the best current fighter from the point of control simplicity, speed, maneuverability (especially in climb), armament, and survivability."

Based on the glowing report by the NII VVS (Nauchno-Issledovatel'skiy Institut Voyenno-Vozdushnykh Sil—Air Force Scientific Test Institute), in early 1942 preparations began to put the I-185 (M-71) into production. A 'production standard setter (etalon)' aircraft was built in April 1942 with a redesigned engine cowling. Its gross weight increased by 144 kg (317 lb) over the earlier prototypes, but the reduction in drag from the new cowling was significant and the top speed increased to 650 km/h (400 mph) at 5000 meters. It underwent manufacturer's tests between June and October and was submitted for the State acceptance tests on 18 November. However, flight testing was interrupted by the need to replace the engine between 17 December 1942 and 26 January 1943. The new engine failed the next day and the aircraft crashed on 27 January. Flight tests were ordered to be continued with the original prototypes to validate the range figures, but the first prototype crashed on 5 April, killing the pilot as he attempted a dead-stick landing.

Following a conversation between Yakovlev and Stalin where Yakovlev refuted the performance data, all work to put the I-185 into production was cancelled, even with the M-82 engine, as they were all required for the La-5 fighter. Another reason cited was that the La-5 used the fuselage of the Lavochkin-Gorbunov-Goudkov LaGG-3 which was already in production in three plants and would involve less disruption of the production lines. Another factor may have been that the La-5 required less duralumin to build, something in short supply at the time.

== Variants ==
Polikarpov began preliminary design of two updated versions of the I-185 design in February 1943. The I-187 had a M-71F engine of 1,640 kW (2,200 hp), a bubble canopy, four 20 mm cannons, eight RS-82 rockets and an estimated maximum speed of 710 km/h (441 mph). The I-188 used an improved M-90 engine with 1,552 kW (2,080 hp) and used the same armament as the I-187, although the fuselage was slimmer than that of the I-187 because of the slimmer engine.

== Specifications (I-185 (M-71 etalon)) ==
Data from

General characteristics

- Crew: 1
- Length: 7.77 m (25 ft 6 in)
- Wingspan: 9.8 m (32 ft 2 in)
- Height: 2.5 m (8 ft 2 in)
- Wing area: 15.53 m^{2} (167.2 sq ft)
- Airfoil: root: NACA 23014; tip: NACA 23008
- Empty weight: 2,654 kg (5,851 lb)
- Gross weight: 3,500 kg (7,716 lb)
- Powerplant: 1 × Shvetsov M-71 18-cylinder air-cooled radial piston engine, 1,492 kW (2,001 hp)
- Propellers: 3-bladed constant-speed propeller

Performance

- Maximum speed: 680 km/h (420 mph, 370 kn)
- Range: 835 km (519 mi, 451 nmi)
- Service ceiling: 11,000 m (36,000 ft)
- Rate of climb: 18.5 m/s (3,640 ft/min)
- Power/mass: 0.430 kW/kg (0.262 hp/lb)

Armament

- Guns: 3 × 20 mm ShVAK cannon
- Rockets: 8 × RS-82 rockets
- Bombs: Up to 500 kg (1,100 lb) of bombs (2 × 250 kg (551 lb) or 4 × 100 kg (220 lb))

== See also ==
Related development

- Polikarpov I-180

Aircraft of comparable role, configuration, and era

- Yakovlev Yak-7
- Mikoyan-Gurevich I-210
- Bloch MB.155
- Focke-Wulf Fw 190
- Kawasaki Ki-60
- Macchi C.202 Folgore
- Nakajima Ki-44
- Reggiane Re.2002 Ariete
- Vultee P-66 Vanguard
- North American P-51 Mustang
- Grumman F6F Hellcat
- Hawker Typhoon
