= Thomas Towle =

American aerospace engineer

Tom Towle
- Born: Tom Towle; 1887; Dayton, Ohio
- Died: 1983 (aged 95–96); Miami, Florida
- Resting place: Dayton, Ohio
- Education: Yale University
- Children: Austin, Tom, Ted

Tom Towle (1887–1983) was an American aircraft designer in charge of developing the Ford Trimotor.

== Early life ==
Towle was raised in Dayton, Ohio and graduated from Yale University in 1920. Towle become an aeronautical engineer for many starting aviation companies.

- 1921-1922 Dayton-Wright Company
- 1922-1923 Martin
- 1923-1924 Aeromarine
- 1924-1925 Stout Metal Airplane Co
- 1925-1927 Stout Metal Airplane Division of the Ford Motor Company After disappointing results from the Stout 3-AT, Ford places Towle in charge of the Ford Tri-motor development.
- 1927 Towle Marine Aircraft - Formed company to build the Towle WC.
- 1928 Eastman Aircraft Corporation of Detroit - Designed the Eastman E-2 Sea Rover.
- 1928-1932 Towle Aircraft Company - Reorganized to produce the Towle TA-2 and Towle TA-3 amphibians.
- 1933 Monocoupe Aircraft Corporation
- 1933-1935 Lambert Aircraft Towle replaced Clayton Folkerts as chief engineer. Designer of Charles Lindbergh's plane, 1934 Model D-127 Monocoupe, which hangs in Terminal 1 at Lambert-St. Louis International Airport.
- 1939 Grumman
- 1941 Hudson Car Company aircraft division - Hired as chief engineer.
- 1951 Worked for the Church & Dwight company, known for baking soda products.
