= Tokyo Koku Aiba 11 =

Aiba 11

General information
- Type: light passenger transport
- National origin: Japan
- Manufacturer: Tokyo Koku KK
- Number built: 1

History
- First flight: June-July 1941

The Tokyo Koku Aiba 11 was a 1940s Japanese civil transport aircraft derived from the Tokyo Koku Aiba 10 trainer. Its cabin accommodated three passengers on taxi or sight-seeing flights. Though well-regarded, developing military demands prevented its production.

== Design and development ==
The Aiba 11 was a Japanese civil aircraft developed from the Aiba 10, sharing the same engine and similar flying surfaces but with a new fuselage. Both types had wooden structures with a mixture of plywood- and fabric-covering.

It was a single bay biplane, with fabric-covered wings of rectangular plan out to elliptical tips. The upper and lower wings were braced together with a pair of N-form interplane struts and the upper centre-section was joined to the fuselage with outward-leaning, N-form cabane struts.

Though both the Aiba 10 and Aiba 11 had uncowled Gasuden Jimpu 3 seven cylinder radial engines mounted in the nose, the fuselages aft were very different. The Aiba 11's was flat-sided, with its three seat, windowed passenger cabin between the wings. It was flown from an open cockpit behind the cabin.

Both had fixed, conventional undercarriages with wheels on split axles hinged just below the fuselage centre-line on short struts. Landing legs and forward drag struts were mounted on the lower fuselage longerons.

The Aiba 11 was completed in June 1941 and flown soon after.

== Operational history ==
The sole Aiba 11 was used by Tokyo Koku as an air taxi, based at Hameda Airport and used mostly for sightseeing flights. It gained a reputation as a stable, responsive aircraft with short ground runs. It was also efficient in operation. However, Japan's extension of the Second Sino-Japanese War into the Pacific War, with attacks on Pearl Harbor and Singapore late in 1941, required Tokyo Koku to produce military training aircraft, so no more Aiba 11s were built.

== Specifications ==
Data from Japanese Aircraft 1910-1941

General characteristics

- Crew: one
- Capacity: three passengers
- Length: 7.68 m (25 ft 2 in)
- Wingspan: 9.20 m (30 ft 2 in)
- Height: 3.22 m (10 ft 7 in)
- Wing area: 21.2 m^{2} (228 sq ft)
- Empty weight: 653 kg (1,440 lb)
- Gross weight: 1,035 kg (2,282 lb)
- Powerplant: 1 × Gasuden Jimpu 3 7 cylinder radial, 110–130 kW (150–180 hp)
- Propellers: 2-bladed Nihon Gakki wooden

Performance

- Maximum speed: 180 km/h (112 mph, 97 kn)
- Cruise speed: 150 km/h (93 mph, 81 kn)
- Landing speed: 80 km/h (50 mph; 43 kn)
