= Naval Air Station Grosse Ile =

- Grosse Ile, Michigan in the United States
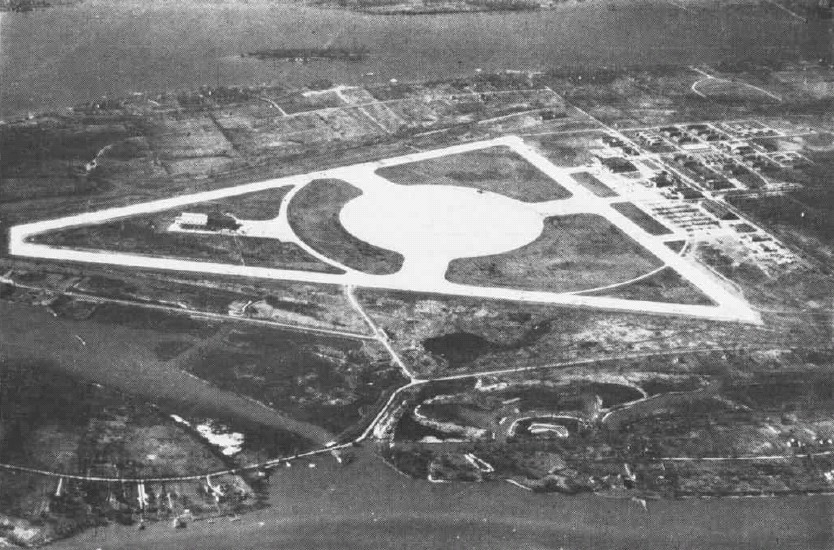
- An aerial view of NAS Grosse Ile during the 1940s

Site information
- Type: Naval Air Station
- Owner: Department of Defense
- Operator: US Navy
- Condition: Closed

Location
- Location in the United States
- Coordinates: 42°05′57″N 83°09′41″W

Site history
- Built: 1929
- In use: 1929–1969
- Fate: Transferred to civilian use and became Grosse Ile Municipal Airport

Naval Air Station Grosse Ile was a Naval air station located on the southern tip of Grosse Ile, Michigan. It operated from 1927 until late 1969, and is now a township airport. During World War II NASGI was one of the largest primary flight training stations for Naval aviators, and Royal Air Force (RAF) pilots. Among the many thousands of Navy pilots who began their careers at NASGI is game show host Bob Barker. Former President George H. W. Bush finished his active Navy career at NASGI attached to Torpedo Squadron 153(VT-153).

== History ==
=== Early years ===
Naval Air Station Grosse Ile was commissioned 7 September 1929 as Naval Reserve Air Base Grosse Ile at Grosse Ile, Michigan. Though that was the official beginning, the air station traces its roots back to July 1925 when four US Naval reservists started an aviation unit near Detroit. At first they had no aircraft, and for over a year had to operate using only classroom instruction. The first aircraft assigned to the Detroit Naval Air Reserves was a single Consolidated NY-1, which remained their sole aircraft for another year. The base at Grosse Ile began with a single tin hangar floated down the Detroit River from the unit's former home near downtown Detroit. By 1927 a large hangar had been built on Olds Bay at the southern tip of the island for use by Navy seaplanes. By 1935 the Navy had acquired all the property formerly owned by The Detroit Aircraft Corporation and a Curtiss-Wright flying school, and had occupied the former Curtiss-Wright hangar, which became the base's primary hangar.

The airship ZMC-2, the Navy's only all-metal airship, was constructed on the site from 1925 to 1929 by the Detroit Aircraft Corporation. The hangar where the airship was constructed measured 120' high, 120' wide and 180' long, and remained the largest structure on the base until it was disassembled in 1960, and its roof reused in the construction of a bowling alley in nearby Trenton, Michigan.

=== 1930s ===
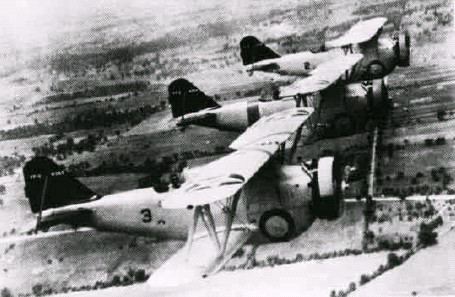
Navy Grumman FF-2 fighters near Grosse Ile in the 1930s

During the depression money was hard to come by, but NRAB Grosse Ile, MI continued to grow, many of its reservist drilling without pay. By the end of 1930 the first Marine unit had been commissioned and based at Grosse Ile.

=== World War II ===
During the war over 5,000 pilots received training at Grosse Ile, mostly Navy cadets, along with over a thousand British RAF pilot trainees. With this rapid expansion the base gained the new designation of Naval Air Station. The primary aircraft stationed at Naval Air Station Grosse Ile during the war years were Consolidated PBY Catalina, Vought F4U Corsairs, Curtiss SB2C Helldivers, and Grumman TBM Avengers. Training was conducted using SNJ, and Boeing Stearman. Immediately following the end of WWII the base was equipped with several squadrons of the huge Martin AM Maulers, and for a short time six McDonnell FH-1 Phantoms, the only jets ever based on the island.

=== Postwar ===
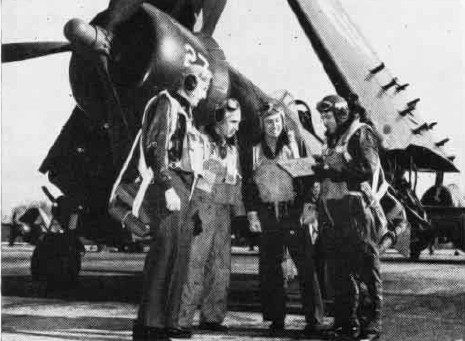
U.S. Marine Corps fighter squadron VMF-251 at Grosse Ile in 1948 flying F4U Corsairs

After the war the base's runways were too short for use by the new generation of Navy jet fighters, and efforts to expand their lengths were met with disapproval by township citizens, so in the 1950s the base saw use as an ASW training base, which continued until the base closed. During this time the base was principally supplied with A-1 Skyraiders, S2F anti-submarine warfare aircraft, as well as Marine Corps Reserve R4Q and R5D cargo aircraft.

In 1956 the Army came to NASGI. A Nike site designated D-51 was built on the base, armed with three Nike Ajax SAM's to defend Detroit against Soviet strategic bombers. The Nike site was operated by U.S. Army personnel who were housed and fed alongside the Navy crews. The Nike site closed in 1963, and was never upgraded to the nuclear-armed Nike Hercules. The Nike missile site is now a conservation area and bird sanctuary controlled by the U.S. Fish & Wildlife Services.

The base also received a small number of helicopters in the late 1950s, beginning with the Piasecki H-25, also known as the HUP-1. Later the crews converted to the larger HSS-1 Seabat. With no Coast Guard station nearby, the helicopters were a highly useful addition to NASGI, and were soon earning their keep performing rescue operations for stranded boaters on Lake Erie and along the Detroit River. On one occasion the base's HUP-1's retrieved 17 fishermen stranded on an ice flow during a snowstorm.

=== 1960s ===
The air station entered the 1960s on a 604-acre (2.44 km^{2}) installation training over 2,000 Naval and Marine Reservists. For the Navy, the principal aircraft remained the A-1 Skyraider and S-2 Tracker, while the Marines converted to the OV-10 Bronco. Many of the men stationed at Naval Air Station Grosse Ile served in Vietnam. On 1 October 1960, future Secretary of Defense Donald Rumsfeld, who was a Naval Aviator and a Lieutenant in the Naval Reserve, was designated as an aircraft commander with Air Antisubmarine Squadron 731 (VS-731), where he flew the S2F Tracker. The base closed in the fall of 1969, with its function and squadrons being moved to the newly established Naval Air Facility Detroit, located north of the city of Detroit as a tenant organization at what was then Selfridge Air Force Base, now Selfridge Air National Guard Base.

=== Grosse Ile Township Airport ===
Immediately following its closure the base was transformed into the Grosse Ile Municipal Airport. There are still some signs of the old naval air station, with the former Hangar 1 now serving as the Township Hall and offices. A museum is located in the township offices and a memorial garden dedicated to the old base and the men and women that served there is located on the old flight line ramp adjacent to Hangar 1. The original Curtiss-Wright flying school hangar still remains and is used to house civilian aircraft and a dance studio. The original tin hangar floated down the Detroit River in 1927 still stands; it is on land controlled by the United States Environmental Protection Agency and not accessible to the public. As of 2011, the airport was averaging 24,000 takeoffs and landings a year.

== Aircraft ==
- ZMC-2
- Consolidated NY-1
- Loening OL-9
- Curtiss TS-1
- Naval Aircraft Factory TS-1
- Boeing F4B-4
- Martin T4M
- Grumman FF-2
- Vought O2U Corsair
- Naval Aircraft Factory N3N Canary
- SNJ
- Boeing Stearman
- Consolidated PBY Catalina
- Curtiss SB2C Helldiver
- Grumman TBM Avenger
- Vought F4U Corsair
- Martin AM Mauler
- McDonnell FH-1 Phantom
- Douglas A-1 Skyraider
- Grumman S-2 Tracker
- Piasecki H-25
- HSS-1 Seabat
- Lockheed P-2 Neptune
- R4Q
- R5D
- North American-Rockwell OV-10 Bronco

== See also ==
- List of military installations in Michigan
