= Fort Chevalier de Repentigny =

Coordinates: 46.499904°N 84.340547°W

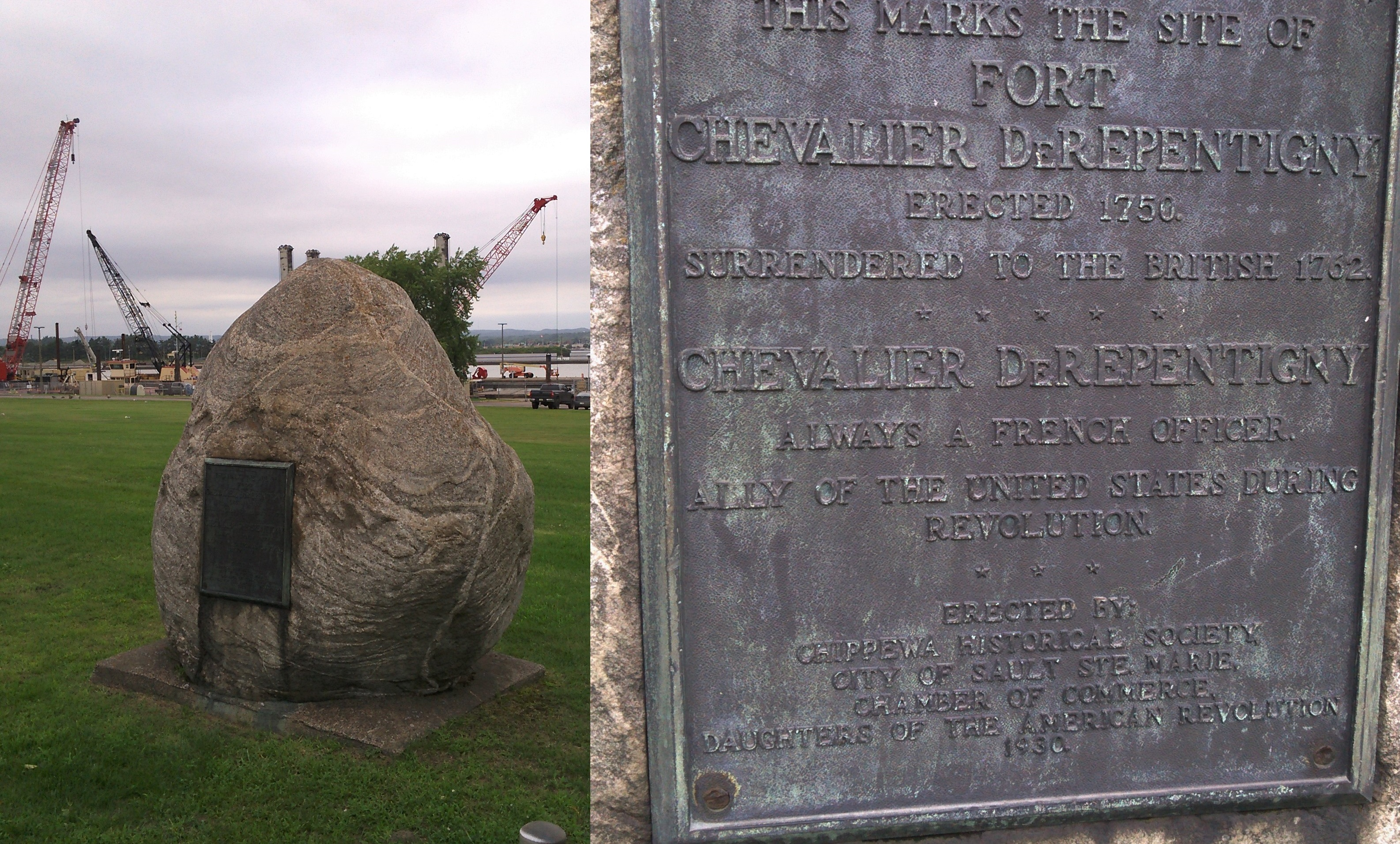
Plaque at site

Fort Chevalier de Repentigny was a French Fort in what is now Sault Ste. Marie, Michigan that was established in 1750. It was taken by the British in 1760 and burned by Ojibwe allies of Pontiac (Ottawa leader) in 1762.

== Sources ==
- Walter Romig, Michigan Place Names, p. 204.
