= Toyota TAA-1 =

Type of aircraft

TAA-1
- Toyota TAA-1 Engine Run Up Prior to First Flight

General information
- Type: Light aircraft
- National origin: Japan / United States of America
- Manufacturer: Toyota Motor Corporation / Scaled Composites
- Number built: 1

History
- First flight: 31 May 2002

The Toyota TAA-1 (also referred to as the TA-1) is a prototype general aviation aircraft substantially built and test flown by Burt Rutan's Scaled Composites under contract with Toyota.

== Design and development ==
First flight of the aircraft took place at the Mojave Airport on May 31, 2002. The project was a joint effort of Toyota Motor Corporation (TMC) and Toyota Motor Sales, USA, Inc (TMS) to determine if "Toyota's aerodynamics and low-cost production technologies could be applied to the small aircraft sector." Although Toyota announced the first flight, company executives have remained relatively silent about the project, and many in the general aviation industry were unaware that the aircraft was even being built.

The first flight was the culmination of four years' design work by a team of 40 engineers, many formerly of Boeing and Raytheon, at TMS's Torrance, CA facilities under an entity referred to as Aviation Business Development Office (ABDO). Preliminary research and design was started by ISHIDA Aerospace, Inc. in Texas in the early 1990s and conceptual work completed during the mid-1990s under the guise of a small company created to keep the Toyota name isolated from the project at that stage. A Toyota official would only say, "We are studying the potential for a single-engine piston plane but there is not a lot we can say." Scaled Composites turned the Toyota engineers' design work into reality and hosted the flight test program at Mojave. Rutan, in a public address, called the aircraft "the aeronautical equivalent to the Lexus LS400."

The prototype TAA-1 is a 4-place, single piston engine aircraft powered by an "engine produced by an outside manufacturer", according to Toyota, and presumably built by Textron Lycoming. (in the 1990s, Toyota attempted to adapt one of their Lexus engines for aviation purposes, but eventually shelved the project due to an industry downturn). The wing, as well as the fuselage, of the aircraft is carbon fiber, constructed in a one piece co-cured single-molded configuration. The fuselage was fabricated by Rocky Mountain Composites, Inc. using a proprietary fiber wetting and placement technique, the wings were produced by Radius Engineering, Inc. with a modified resin transfer molding process. The project was unique for Scaled Composites as never before had an aircraft been completed there using composite wing and fuselage structures that were designed and fabricated elsewhere.

The empty weight of the prototype was significantly beyond predictions and the unsubstantiated rumors within the industry are that the aircraft's performance during the test flight was below what was expected, and it does not appear that much flight test activity followed the initial flight. The prototype aircraft remains stored in a Scaled Composites hangar. A follow-on design, TAA-2, (substantially similar airframe with retractable landing gear, upgraded avionics and higher performance engine with constant speed propeller) was also envisioned however never made it to the prototype stage.

After several years of negotiation for a potential joint venture with the general aviation piston aircraft market leader of that time, interest in the TAA-1 declined after the initial flight test and that outside partnership development evaporated shortly thereafter.
