= ZMC (airship) =

ZMC is the U.S. Navy designation for an airship (Z) of metal-clad (MC) construction. The ZMC-2 was the only airship to carry this designation.
