= Tokyo Koku Aiba-Tsubame =

Japanese civil transport aircraft

Aiba-Tsubame (Aiba-Swallow)

General information
- Type: Low cost, three passenger civil transport
- Manufacturer: Tokyo Koku KK (Tokyo Aviation Co. Ltd)
- Number built: 2

History
- First flight: About September 1936

The Tokyo Koku Aiba-Tsubame or Tokyo Aviation Aiba-Swallow was a 1930s Japanese civil transport with seats for three passengers. It was intended to be cheap to produce so, although its fuselage was a new design, its wings and undercarriage were those of another Japanese aircraft. Two were built and flew taxi services and joyrides.

== Design and development ==
Tokyo Aviation was formed in 1936 from the 1935 Tokyo Air Transport Co., founded by Tamotsu Aiba. It aimed to produce low cost civil transport and trainer aircraft. The Aiba-Tsubame, its first design, was a three passenger aircraft with a new fuselage and a Japanese engine, married to the wings, tail and undercarriage of the Yokosuka Navy Type 3 Primary Trainer, a Japanese update of the Avro 504 with revised empennage and undercarriage. It was funded by the Imperial Flying Association.

A biplane, its two bay wings were rectangular in plan out to rounded tips, braced by two parallel pairs of interplane struts on each side and supported over the fuselage with near-vertical, parallel pairs of short cabane struts. There were externally interconnected ailerons on upper and lower wings, reaching from near the wingtips across the outer bay.

Its 150 hp (110 kW) Gasuden Jimpu Kai-1 seven cylinder radial engine was mounted in the nose of a deep, flat-sided, fuselage with curved upper decking. Structurally the fuselage was entirely wooden. It was flown from an open cockpit under the leading edge of the upper wing. The cabin seated three passengers who, in the prototype (Aiba-Tsubame 6), had windows over the wing. The second aircraft, the Aiba-Tsubame 7, had a longer cabin with an extra window behind the trailing edge.

The Aiba-Tsubame had a tail with a cropped, triangular profile fin which carried a full, rounded, balanced rudder very distinct from the comma form of most 504s' rudders. The broad, rectangular plan horizontal tail was very similar to that of the 504.

Its undercarriage was of the single axle type, with landing legs to the inner wing and rearward drag struts meeting at the fuselage centre-line.

The Aiba-Tsubame 6 was completed in September 1936, followed by the Aiba-Tsubame 7 in December. They were the only examples built. Despite the similarities of name, the Aiba-Tsubame 8 Trainer was a different design, a two seat, single bay biplane.

== Operational history ==
Based at Haneda Airport, the two Swallows were used as taxis and for sight-seeing flights. They proved reliable, safe in flight, stable and easy to control, becoming the most familiar of Haneda's aircraft.

== Variants ==
Aiba-Tsubame 6
First airframe.
Aiba-Tsubame 7
As Aiba-Tsubame 6 but with an internally extended cabin and slightly (about 28 kg (62 lb)) heavier.

== Specifications (Aiba-Tsubame 6) ==
Data from Japanese Aircraft 1910-1941

General characteristics

- Crew: one
- Capacity: three passengers
- Length: 8.43 m (27 ft 8 in)
- Wingspan: 11.165 m (36 ft 8 in)
- Height: 3.14 m (10 ft 4 in)
- Wing area: 30.4 m^{2} (327 sq ft)
- Empty weight: 686 kg (1,512 lb)
- Gross weight: 1,071 kg (2,361 lb)
- Powerplant: 1 × Gasuden Jimpu Kai-1 seven cylinder radial, 110 kW (150 hp)
- Propellers: 2-bladed Kawanishi 5, wooden

Performance

- Maximum speed: 153 km/h (95 mph, 83 kn)
- Cruise speed: 100 km/h (62 mph, 54 kn)
- Range: 430 km (267 mi, 232 nmi)
- Endurance: 3.9 hrs
- Service ceiling: 4,100 m (13,500 ft)
- Time to altitude: 22 min 5 s to 3,000 m (9,800 ft)
