= Toczołowski-Wulw TW-12 =

Polish trainer aircraft

TW-12

General information
- Type: Club trainer aircraft
- National origin: Poland
- Designer: Henryk Toczołowski and Józef Wulw
- Number built: 1

History
- First flight: 29 September or November 1933

The Toczołowski-Wulw TW-12 was a one-off, two-seat, single-engined club trainer, though certification difficulties delayed its use until 1935 and then only as a single-seater.

== Design and development ==
Henryk Toczołowski and Józef Wulw designed the TW-12 in 1929-30 but had to build the structure slowly in their spare time. They were both members of the P.W.S. Aero Club and eventually got permission to use the P.W.S. workshops but the TW-12 was not ready for flight until the second half of 1933. There is uncertainty about the date of the first flight, which one source gives as 29 September 1933 and another as 29 November 1933.

The TW-12 was an all-wood aircraft, with a cantilever, one piece low wing which was trapezoidal in plan. It was built around twin spars and covered in a mixture of plywood and fabric.

It was powered by a 60–66 kW (80–88 hp) five cylinder Armstrong-Siddeley Genet radial engine. The fuselage, with rectangular section structure and rounded decking, was plywood covered. The TW-12 had two open, tandem cockpits fitted with dual control. Its landing gear was fixed and conventional.

Early flight testing revealed some handling problems, particularly at low speeds in the landing approach. After some modifications the TW-12 went to the I.B.T.L. at Warsaw for official airworthiness tests, which led again to concerns about the low speed handling and also about the low fuel capacity (8.8 imp gal (40 L; 10.6 US gal)). In the summer of 1935 the TW-12 was allowed to fly as a single-seater, with the forward cockpit covered over and with a rudder of increased area.

== Operational history ==
On its release from the I.B.T.L., the WT-12 was scheduled to take part in the P.W.S. Club rally on 28 July 1935 at their home base at Biała Podlaska. According to one account, Antoni Uszacki decided to take advantage of a strong tail wind to fly it from Warsaw to Lviv, some 370 km (230 mi) away. Despite the limited fuel capacity (40 L (8.8 imp gal; 11 US gal), he arrived safely though with a dry tank. The club began to use the TW-12 as a trainer but its career was soon cut short by a landing crash with Tadeusz Arcinowski at the controls.

Another account states that Uszacki flew it at the rally but only achieved last (6th) place, and that Arcinowski flew it soon afterwards from Warsaw to Lviv but crashed on landing.

== Specifications (two seat version) ==
Data from J. Cynk, 1971 except where noted

General characteristics

- Crew: One pilot
- Capacity: One pupil
- Length: 6.5 m (21 ft 4 in)
- Wingspan: 10.5 m (34 ft 5 in)
- Height: 2.2 m (7 ft 3 in)
- Wing area: 14.5 m^{2} (156 sq ft)
- Empty weight: 285 kg (628 lb)
- Max takeoff weight: 500 kg (1,102 lb)
- Fuel capacity: 8.8 imp gal (40 L; 10.6 US gal)
- Powerplant: 1 × Armstrong-Siddeley Genet 5-cylinder radial engine, 60–66 kW (80–88 hp)

Performance

- Maximum speed: 170 km/h (110 mph, 92 kn) at sea level
- Cruise speed: 155–150 km/h (96–93 mph, 84–81 kn)
- Service ceiling: 2,900 m (9,500 ft)
- Rate of climb: 2.8–2.2 m/s (550–430 ft/min)
- Landing speed: 70 km/h (43 mph)
