= Towle WC =

WC
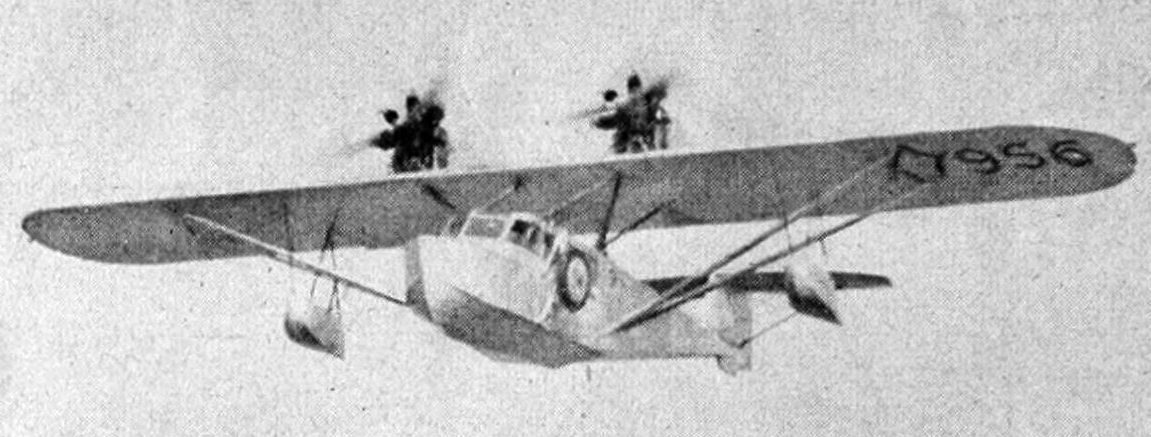

General information
- Type: Amphibious aircraft
- National origin: United States of America
- Manufacturer: Towle Marine Aircraft Engineering Company
- Designer: Thomas Towle
- Number built: 2

History
- Introduction date: 1928
- First flight: November 1928
- Variant: Towle TA-2

The Towle WC, or Towle TA-1, was a custom built aircraft for a 1929 round-the world flight.

== Design and development ==
Thomas Towle was an engineer who had been involved with many early aircraft designs. Having just co-designed the Eastman-E2 Sea Rover, Towle was commissioned by Henry McCarroll to promote Detroit's aviation production capabilities.

The WC was a flying boat with an aluminum hull. The strut braced parasol wing was fabric covered.

== Operational history ==
The prototype WC flew as far as Brazil before engine reliability issues forced the cancellation of the round-the-world flight attempt.

== Variants ==
- Towle TA-2 Was built as a successor to the WC model

== Specifications (Towle WC) ==
Data from Flight

General characteristics

- Capacity: 4
- Length: 35 ft (11 m)
- Wingspan: 52 ft (16 m)
- Empty weight: 2,750 lb (1,247 kg)
- Gross weight: 4,420 lb (2,005 kg)
- Powerplant: 2 × Comet R-612 Seven cylinder radial, 150 hp (110 kW) each

Performance

- Maximum speed: 100 kn (115 mph, 185 km/h)
- Minimum control speed: 39 kn (45 mph, 72 km/h)

Aircraft of comparable role, configuration, and era

- Fairchild FB-3
