= Towle Marine Aircraft Engineering =

American aircraft manufacturer

Towle Marine Aircraft Engineering Company
- Industry: Amphibious Aircraft Manufacturer
- Founded: 1927
- Defunct: 1927
- Successor: Towle Aircraft Company (1928-1932)
- Headquarters: Detroit, Michigan
- Key people: Thomas Towle

Towle Marine Aircraft Engineering Company was an American aircraft manufacturer of light amphibious aircraft.

The short lived Towle Marine Aircraft Engineering Company, and its successor Towle Aircraft Company were founded by former Stout Metal Airplane Division of the Ford Motor Company engineer Thomas Towle initially to build a custom round-the world amphibious aircraft, and follow-on aircraft based on the design.

In a 1930 patent, Towle listed the Towle Aircraft Company as part of the Michigan Amphibian Airplane Corporation.

At the height of the depression, financing was difficult. Towle's TA-3 used diesel engines on loan from Packard, and was funded by Dr. Adams, a "painless dentist" of the Detroit region.

== Aircraft ==
Summary of aircraft built by Towle
Model name	First flight	Number built	Type
Towle WC	1928	2	Amphibious
Towle TA-2	1929	1	Amphibious
Towle TA-3	1931	1	Amphibious
