= Polikarpov I-180 =

Soviet aircraft prototype

I-180
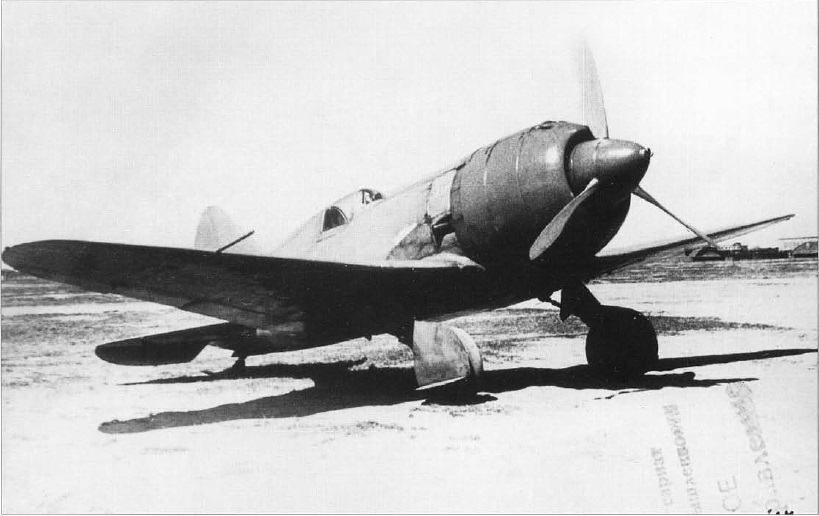
- I-180-3 prototype

General information
- Type: Fighter
- Manufacturer: Polikarpov
- Designer: Nikolai Nikolaevich Polikarpov
- Status: Cancelled
- Primary user: Soviet Air Forces
- Number built: 10 production + 3 prototypes

History
- Manufactured: 1938–1940
- First flight: 15 December 1938
- Developed from: Polikarpov I-16
- Developed into: Polikarpov I-185

The Polikarpov I-180 (Russian: И-180) was a 1938 Soviet fighter prototype. It was the last attempt to extract performance from the basic Polikarpov I-16 design. The development cycle was plagued with problems, especially with the death of the star Soviet test pilot Valery Chkalov in one of the prototypes.

== Design and development ==
The I-180 represented a further development of the basic I-16 design in order to take advantage of the more powerful radial engines coming into service. It was designed to meet a requirement of the Soviet Air Force of January 1938 for a new interceptor aircraft with a radial engine. It was preceded by a series of projected I-16 variants with a more powerful Tumansky M-88 two-row radial engine: I-161, I-162, I-163, I-164, I-165, I-166 and I-167.

The I-180 was a single-engine, low-wing monoplane aircraft of mixed construction with a duraluminum frame covered in plywood and fabric. The pilot sat near the tailfin in an open cockpit with a windshield similar to the I-16. The landing gear was retracted pneumatically, including the tail wheel. The main visual difference between the I-180 and I-16 was a new wing with a perpendicular straight leading edge, and an aerodynamically refined fuselage with a longer slim engine cowling. The new fighter was to be powered by an 820 kW (1,100 hp) M-88 engine, a development of the license-built Gnome-Rhône Mistral Major (known as M-85 in the USSR), and represented the next step in evolution from the 1937 I-165-11 prototype. The proposed armament consisted of four 7.62 mm (0.3 in) ShKAS machine guns and 200 kg (440 lb) of bombs. Dmitriy Tomashevich was assigned as the lead designer.

The ill-fated development of the I-180 started early on. The only version of the M-88 available at the time used reduction gear requiring a very large propeller, at least 3.2 meters (10 ft 6 in) in diameter – massive for an aircraft that in layout and dimensions resembled an I-16 with an elongated nose. Even before leaving the drawing board, the fighter had to be redesigned for an M-88R engine with reduction gear and a constant-speed propeller. The projected top speed fell from 572 km/h (355 mph) to 557 km/h (345 mph). The first prototype, however, was eventually fitted with a similar M-87 950 hp engine, because the M-88R was not ready. The prototype was built at Number 156 Factory in Moscow.

== Testing and evaluation ==
The VISh-23Ye propeller was delayed, and early test runs were conducted using a different propeller with manual pitch control (VISh-3Ye). Consequently, the engine was prone to overheating, and to compensate for this the cowling flaps restricting airflow around the engine were removed. Despite these problems, and the fact that the prototype had not completed all ground tests, the authorities were demanding a test flight as soon as possible. Polikarpov himself objected to flying the prototype before it would be ready, around February 1939, but he could not stop it. The series of events which took place on 15 December 1938, while not entirely clear, are tragic. Neither Polikarpov nor Tomashevich approved the initial flight, and no one had signed the form releasing the prototype from the factory. The famous Soviet test pilot Valery Chkalov took off and made a low-altitude circuit around the airfield. For the second circuit, Chkalov flew farther away, climbing to over 2,000 m (6,560 ft), even though the flight plan specifically forbade exceeding 600 m (1,970 ft). Chkalov apparently miscalculated his landing approach and came in short of the airfield but, when he attempted to correct, the engine stalled. The pilot was able to avoid several buildings but crashed into a power line. Chkalov was thrown from the cockpit, badly injured, and died two hours later.

The official government investigation concluded that the engine stalled because it became too cold in the absence of the cowl flaps. Others hypothesized that Chkalov rapidly advanced the throttle and flooded the engine. As the result of the crash, Tomashevich and several other officials, including Arms Industry Department director S. Belyakin, who urged the first flight, were immediately arrested. Years later, fellow test pilot M.M. Gromov blamed the designers for flawed engine cooling and Chkalov himself for deviating from the flight plan. Chkalov's son also claimed that a plot to assassinate his father had been brewing in the months preceding his death, but the circumstances of the crash make foul play unlikely. Regardless, with Chkalov's death Polikarpov's reputation with Joseph Stalin suffered a blow from which he would never recover.

Nevertheless, work on the I-180 continued. The second prototype I-180-2 with a bigger wingspan of 10.09 m (33 ft 1 in) and M-87A engine flew on 27 April 1939, and participated in the May Day parade a few days later. Later, the engine was changed to the M-87B and the wing construction was strengthened. The prototype demonstrated a top speed of 540 km/h (335 mph) and was recommended for mass production with the M-88 engine. Then, on 5 September 1939, I-180-2 piloted by Tomas Suzi crashed during high-altitude testing, killing the pilot. Again, the exact circumstances of the crash were unclear. According to eyewitnesses, the aircraft dove steeply (others claimed it fell in a spin) to 3,000 m (9,840 ft) where it leveled out, then entered a spin again, leveling out once more at 300 m (985 ft). The pilot then abandoned the aircraft but did not use his parachute. No definite explanation was ever given but hypotheses include blinding of the pilot by oil from a leaking oil cooler, a heart attack, or loss of consciousness due to the failure of oxygen equipment.

Preparations were carried out in 1940 to produce the first batch of 10 aircraft at Factory No.21 in Gorki, engaged in manufacturing the I-16. However, their production was extremely slow, without much attention of the aviation authorities, with the first 10 aircraft taking more than eight months. One of the reasons for this was that the local OKB led by M.M. Pashinin was designing their own I-16 based fighter, the Pashinin I-21 and factory management had devoted all of their resources to the hometown favorite, with only six brand new engineers assigned to production of the I-180. While this was being investigated, the third prototype I-180-3, powered by a more powerful M-88R engine and fitted with a stressed skin wing (replacing the I-16 type wing structure of the previous prototypes) was completed, flying on 10 February 1940. It was armed with two 12.7 mm Berezin BS and two 7.62 mm ShKAS machine guns on a common gunbed over the engine.

Finally in April 1940, three aircraft designated I-180S were completed, these being similar to the I-180-3, but reverting to an open cockpit and the I-16 type wing structure. Their test flights were favorable. The new fighter resembled I-16 in agility but was more stable. Top speed was 575 km/h (357 mph). Major criticisms included the open canopy and poor build quality. It was believed that fixing these defects would raise the top speed to 600 km/h (373 mph). However, the I-180-3 prototype crashed on 6 July 1940, when it entered an inverted spin due to pilot error. The pilot was able to safely bail out. In preparation for production, Polikarpov produced the definitive I-180-5 with several modifications and M-88A engine without reduction gear. The aircraft could also accept the new M-89 engine with 1,007 kW (1,350 hp) (up to 1,165 kW (1,560 hp) with fuel injection) which would raise its top speed to over 650 km/h (404 mph). There was also a proposal for the I-180Sh with improved main landing gear.

Then, near the end of 1940, Polikarpov was suddenly informed that the I-180 was being cancelled, and that Factory no.21 would manufacture LaGG-3 fighters instead. The reason for this was a misconception of the Ministry of Aviation Industry, that radial engines in NACA cowlings were poorly suited for aircraft with top speeds of over 500 km/h (310 mph), owing to high drag. Former government officials later admitted that the fascination with liquid-cooled engines stemmed in part from attempts to imitate the then state-of-the-art Messerschmitt Bf 109. Stalin's dislike for Polikarpov after Chkalov's death probably also played a role.

According to some recent historians, such as Mikhail Maslov, the cancellation of the I-180 was caused by personal and non content-related reasons and might be considered an error. Especially after Chkalov's death, the Soviet authorities started to promote young designers, in preference to Polikarpov, despite the fact that the I-180 was the best performing Soviet fighter at the time of its cancellation and that it was faster than the Bf 109. One prototype series I-180 developed a speed of 585 km/h that could be improved after projected changes, such as adding a closed canopy. The next best fighter, Yakovlev's I-26 (Yak-1 prototype), suffered from a troublesome and protracted development cycle, but Alexander Sergeyevich Yakovlev was one of Stalin's favorites, which most probably saved his design. In addition, the I-180 could have been available much earlier than the Yak-1 and LaGG-3 types, and producing it with a temporary M-87 engine, until the M-88 could be improved, was a possibility. Crashes of I-180 prototypes were mostly accidental, and should not be regarded as disqualifying the design. Moreover, the I-180 showed much fewer "teething problems" than its counterparts, especially the Yak-1, confirming Polikarpov's competence in aircraft design. Another advantage was that the construction of the I-180 was similar to the I-16, which was familiar to the Soviet industry and pilots, but handling of the I-180 was even easier and it was more stable. The same situation recurred with Polikarpov's next design, the advanced I-185, based on the I-180 design.

== Operators ==
=== Soviet Union ===
- Soviet Air Force

== Specifications (I-180S) ==
Data from Fighting Polikarpov, Eagles of the East No.2

General characteristics

- Crew: 1
- Length: 7 m (23 ft 0 in)
- Wingspan: 10.09 m (33 ft 1 in)
- Height: 2.45 m (8 ft 0 in)
- Wing area: 16.11 m^{2} (173.4 sq ft)
- Airfoil: Clark YH
- Empty weight: 1,815 kg (4,001 lb)
- Gross weight: 2,429 kg (5,355 lb)
- Max takeoff weight: 2,650 kg (5,842 lb)
- Powerplant: 1 × Tumansky M-88R 14-cylinder twin-row air-cooled radial piston engine, 820 kW (1,100 hp)
- Propellers: 3-bladed constant-speed propeller

Performance

- Maximum speed: 585 km/h (364 mph, 316 kn) at altitude
- Range: 900 km (560 mi, 490 nmi)
- Service ceiling: 11,000 m (36,000 ft)
- Rate of climb: 16.7 m/s (3,290 ft/min)
- Wing loading: 151 kg/m^{2} (31 lb/sq ft)
- Power/mass: 0.34 kW/kg (0.21 hp/lb)

Armament

- Guns:

- 2 × 12.7mm Berezin BS machine guns
- 2 × 7.62mm ShKAS machine guns

- Bombs:

- 200 kg (440 lb) of bombs

== See also ==
Related development

- Polikarpov I-185

Aircraft of comparable role, configuration, and era

- Bloch MB.152
- Fiat G.50
- Focke-Wulf Fw 190
- IAR 80
- Lavochkin LaGG-3
- Macchi C.200
- MÁVAG Héja
- Messerschmitt Bf 109E
- Mitsubishi A6M
- PZL.50
- Weiss Manfréd WM-23 Ezüst Nyíl
- Yakovlev Yak-1

Related lists

- List of military aircraft of the Soviet Union and the CIS
- List of fighter aircraft
