= Merchant of Death =

Merchant of Death, death merchants, or variations may refer to:

- Merchants of death, a phrase used to describe arms industry

== People ==
- Viktor Bout (born 1967), Russian arms dealer nicknamed the Merchant of Death
- Sarkis Soghanalian (1929–2011), Armenian Cold War-era private arms dealer nicknamed the Merchant of Death
- Basil Zaharoff (1849–1936), Greek arms dealer nicknamed the Merchant of Death
- Alfred Nobel (1833–1896), Swedish businessman who invented dynamite and established the Nobel Prize, nicknamed "the Merchant of Death"

=== Fictional characters ===
- Death Merchant, Weisheit, a fictional character from the 2006 videogame Wild Arms XF
- Tony Stark (Marvel Cinematic Universe), a weapons dealer from the Marvel Cinematic Universe accused of being a merchant of death

== Literature ==
- The Merchant of Death, 2002 fantasy novel in the Pendragon series by D.J. MacHale
- Death Merchant, action-adventure novels by Joseph Rupert Rosenberger
- Death Merchant Chronicles, a series of novels by Christopher Moore
- Death Merchants, 2003 action-adventure story by Tim Tresslar in the Executioner series, see List of Mack Bolan books
- Diagnosis Murder: The Death Merchant, a medical mystery novel by Lee Goldberg, in the media franchise Diagnosis: Murder
- Merchants of Death, a 1934 exposé about the arms industry, discussed at Merchants of death
- Merchants of Death, a comic book title published by Eclipse Comics, see List of Eclipse Comics publications
- Merchants of Death, a manga episode chapter of Cyborg 009
- Merchant of Death: Money, Guns, Planes, and the Man Who Makes War Possible, 2007 non-fiction book by Douglas Farah and Stephen Braun about arms dealer Victor Bout
- El mercader de la muerte (Spanish: Merchant of Death), 2020 novel about Basil Zaharoff by Gervasio Posadas Mañé

== Music ==
- "Death Merchants", 2011 song by Sutter Kain and Darko off the album Mask of the Demon
- "Merchants of Death", 2002 song by Manila Road off the album Spiral Castle
- "Merchant of Death", 2008 instrumental by Ramin Djawadi from the movie soundtrack Iron Man
- "Merchants of Death", 2020 song by Havok off the album V

== Television ==
- "The Death Merchant", 1966 episode of the TV series The Time Tunnel
- "Merchants of Death", 1983 season 2 number 4 episode 26 of Knight Rider
- "Merchants of Death", 1975 season 4 number 11 episode 83 of The Streets of San Francisco
- "Merchant of Death", 1961 season 1 episode 4 of Top Secret
- "The Merchant of Death", 1988 season 1 episode 16 of Wiseguy
- "The Merchant of Death: Viktor Bout", 2019 season 3 number 7 of the documentary TV series Declassified

== Other uses ==
- The Undertaker (1988 film), also released as Death Merchant

== See also ==
- Personifications of death
