= Tupolev '102' =

Type of aircraft

'102'

General information
- Type: Airliner
- National origin: Soviet Union
- Manufacturer: Tupolev
- Designer: Andrei Tupolev
- Number built: None

History
- Developed from: Tupolev Tu-101

The Tupolev '102' and Tupolev '101' were 1950s projects for a turboprop airliner and assault transport by the Tupolev Design Bureau. The aircraft designs were almost identical but the '101' had a rear loading ramp and tail barbette for two Nudelman-Rikhter NR-23 cannon. The internal arrangement also differed with the '101' cabin being unpressurised apart from the flightdeck and a small cabin for ten passengers, whilst the '102's pressurised cabin was in one section, configured for 40 passengers.

Similar requirements were also issued to OKB-23 (V.M. Myasischchev) and OKB-473 (Oleg K. Antonov), resulting in the Antonov An-8 which formed the design root of all Antonov's turboprop transports up to the An-22.

== Specifications ('102' projected) ==
Data from OKB Tupolev : a history of the design bureau and its aircraft

General characteristics

- Crew: 7

'101' 4 to 5

- Capacity: 40 pax / 4,000–5,000 kg (8,800–11,000 lb)

'101' 10 pax with 4,000–8,000 kg (8,800–17,600 lb)

- Length: 40 m (131 ft 3 in) / 36 m (118 ft)
- Wingspan: 40 m (131 ft 3 in)
- Diameter: 3.8 m (12 ft 6 in) fuselage
- Wing area: 140 m^{2} (1,500 sq ft)
- Gross weight: 36,000 kg (79,366 lb)

'101' 37,500 m (123,000 ft)

- Powerplant: 2 × Kuznetsov TV-2F turboprop engines, 5,200 kW (7,000 shp) each

Performance

- Maximum speed: 650 km/h (400 mph, 350 kn) to 700 km/h (430 mph; 380 kn) at 8,000 m (26,000 ft)

'101' 650–700 km/h (400–430 mph; 350–380 kn) at 8,000 m (26,000 ft)

- Range: 3,000 km (1,900 mi, 1,600 nmi) to 4,000 km (2,500 mi; 2,200 nmi)

'101' 4,000 km (2,500 mi; 2,200 nmi) with 4,000 kg (8,800 lb) payload at 34,500 kg (76,100 lb) Take-off weight
'101' 2,650 km (1,650 mi; 1,430 nmi) with 5,000 kg (11,000 lb) payload at 34,500 kg (76,100 lb) Take-off weight

- Service ceiling: 1,000 m (3,300 ft) - 12,000 m (39,000 ft)

'101' 11,000–12,000 m (36,000–39,000 ft)

- Take-off run: 500–600 m (1,600–2,000 ft)
- Landing run '102': 600–750 m (1,970–2,460 ft)
  - Landing run '101': 350–400 m (1,150–1,310 ft) with reverse pitch

Armament

- Guns: ('101' 2 x 23 mm (0.91 in) Nudelman-Rikhter NR-23 cannon)
