= Umm Al Quwain Ilyushin Il-76 =

Abandoned Soviet era cargo plane

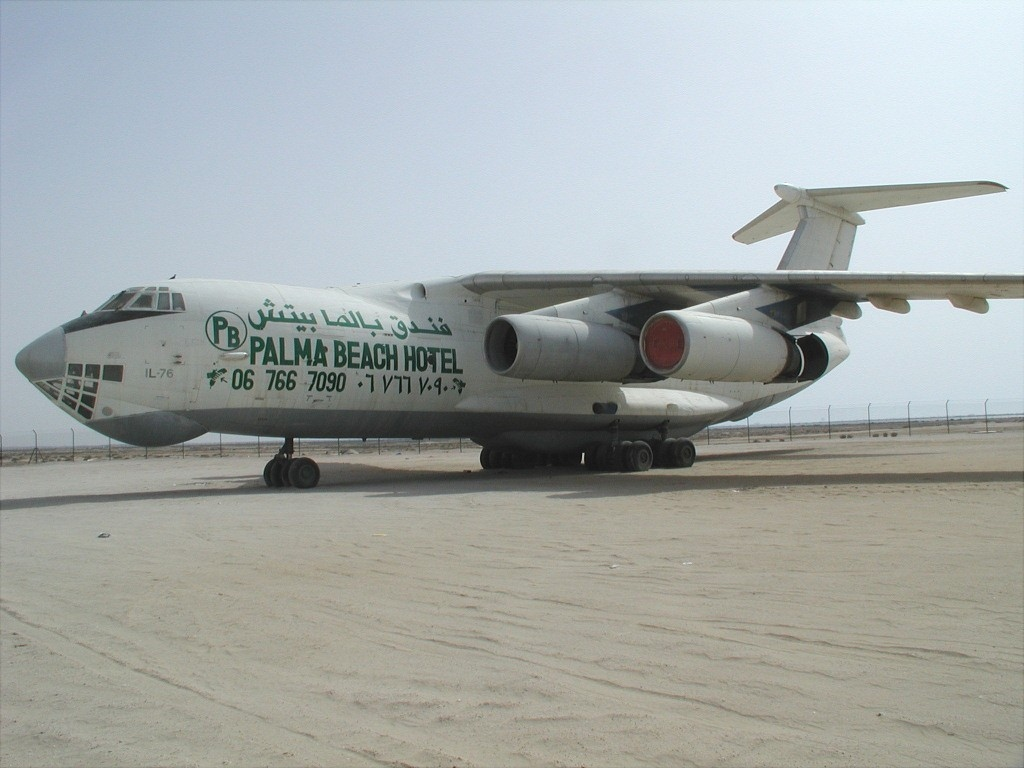
The Il-76 in Umm Al Quwain in 2001.

The Umm Al Quwain Ilyushin Il-76 was a Soviet era cargo plane that sat abandoned by the E11 road in the United Arab Emirates from 2000 to 2022.

== Before arrival in Umm Al Quwain ==
The aircraft was built in 1975 in the Soviet Union, in present-day Uzbekistan. The plane was used for Soviet military transport, and after the collapse of the Soviet Union in 1991 was used by the Russian Air Force. In the early 1990s, the plane was sold to civilian airline Air Cess.

Air Cess was founded by Russian arms dealer Viktor Bout in 1995. After Air Cess was forced to disband over several breaches of aviation law, Bout transferred the plane to another one of his ventures, Centrafrican Airlines.

During the time period that Bout was using the plane, he was involved in the arms trade in a wide range of conflicts in Africa, the Middle East and Yugoslavia. In Liberia, Bout was suspected of supplying Charles Taylor with arms for use in the First Liberian Civil War. From 1996 to 1998, Bout was said to be the main supplier of weapons for UNITA, which was subject to UN embargoes at the time for its attacks on civilians and UN personnel. An investigation has found that Bout sold millions of dollars of weaponry to the Taliban in the late 1990s.

== Arrival in Umm Al Quwain ==
When the Ilyushin was approaching the end of its lifetime, Bout sold the plane to an advertising firm with the promise to turn it into a roadside billboard. Palma Beach Hotel's logo is painted onto the fuselage in large green letters. However, only three of the plane's four engines were working, and Bout paid the pilot $20,000 to transport the plane to Umm Al Quwain airfield (now closed). In video footage of the Ilyushin landing in Umm Al Quwain, people can be heard cheering and applauding as the plane touches down. The plane remained there for 22 years, becoming a tourist destination.

In early 2002, the United Arab Emirates banned Bout from entering the country and operating any companies there.

== Dismantling ==
The plane was dismantled and scrapped in May 2022 in order to build a bridge connecting mainland Umm Al Quwain to Siniyah Island, where a $675 million development is being planned. The plane was then sold to a scrap dealer. A local enthusiast acquired some of the Ilyushin's skin in order to upcycle it into collectible tags and sell them.
