= Stephen Braun =

US reporter for the Associated Press

Stephen Braun is a reporter for the Associated Press.

Braun was with the Los Angeles Times for many years, and served as national correspondent for the paper from 1993 to 2008. While at the Times, the paper won a Pulitzer Prize in 1993 for its coverage of the 1992 Los Angeles riots, where Braun played an integral part of the writing.

Reporting done by Braun with Eileen Sullivan in August 2016 regarding donors to the Clinton Foundation who later met with Hillary Clinton when she was Secretary of State received a great deal of scrutiny.

Braun also previously reported for the Detroit Free Press, Philadelphia Daily News and Baltimore News-American. He graduated from the University of Pennsylvania in 1975.

Braun also co-authored the book Merchant of Death: Money, Guns, Planes, and the Man Who Makes War Possible (2007) with Douglas Farah. The book tells the story of the international weapons dealer Viktor Bout, and was released a year before Bout was arrested in a DEA sting. The book detailed how Bout was able to deliver weapons to the deviant groups and nations, including militants in the Taliban, Somalia, and Yemen. Publishers Weekly wrote that, "The authors paint a depressing picture of an avalanche of war-making material pouring into poor, violence-wracked nations despite well-publicized U.N. embargoes."
