= Kuznetsov TV-2 =

1950s Soviet/Russian turboprop aircraft engine

TV-2
- Type: Turboprop
- National origin: Soviet Union
- Manufacturer: Kuybyshev Engine Design Bureau
- First run: 1951
- Major applications: Tupolev Tu-91
- Developed from: TV-022
- Developed into: 2TV-2F; TV-12/NK-12

The Kuznetsov TV-2 was a turboprop engine, designed by the Kuybyshev Engine Design Bureau.

== Applications ==
TV-2F
Antonov An-8 (proposed)
Tupolev '101' (project)
Tupolev '102' (project)
Tupolev Tu-118 (project)

TV-2M
Tupolev Tu-91 (prototype only)

TV-2T
Antonov An-8 (proposed)

== Specifications (TV-2F) ==
Data from engine.aviaport.ru

==== General characteristics ====
- Type: Turboprop engine
- Length:
- Diameter:
- Dry weight:

==== Components ====
- Compressor: 14-stage compressor
- Turbine: 3-stage turbine

==== Performance ====
- Maximum power output:
  - 6,250 hp (4,660 kW) at takeoff
  - 2,550 hp (1,900 kW) in cruise
- Overall pressure ratio: 5.8
- Air mass flow:
  - 30 kg/s (66 lb/s) at takeoff
  - 10.6 kg/s (23 lb/s) in cruise
- Turbine inlet temperature: 1,150 K (880 °C; 1,610 °F)
- Specific fuel consumption:
  - 0.294 kg/(hp⋅h) at takeoff
  - 0.218 kg/(hp⋅h) in cruise

== See also ==
Comparable engines

- Kuznetsov NK-12

Related lists

- List of aircraft engines
