= Centrafrican Airlines =

African airline

Centafrican Airlines

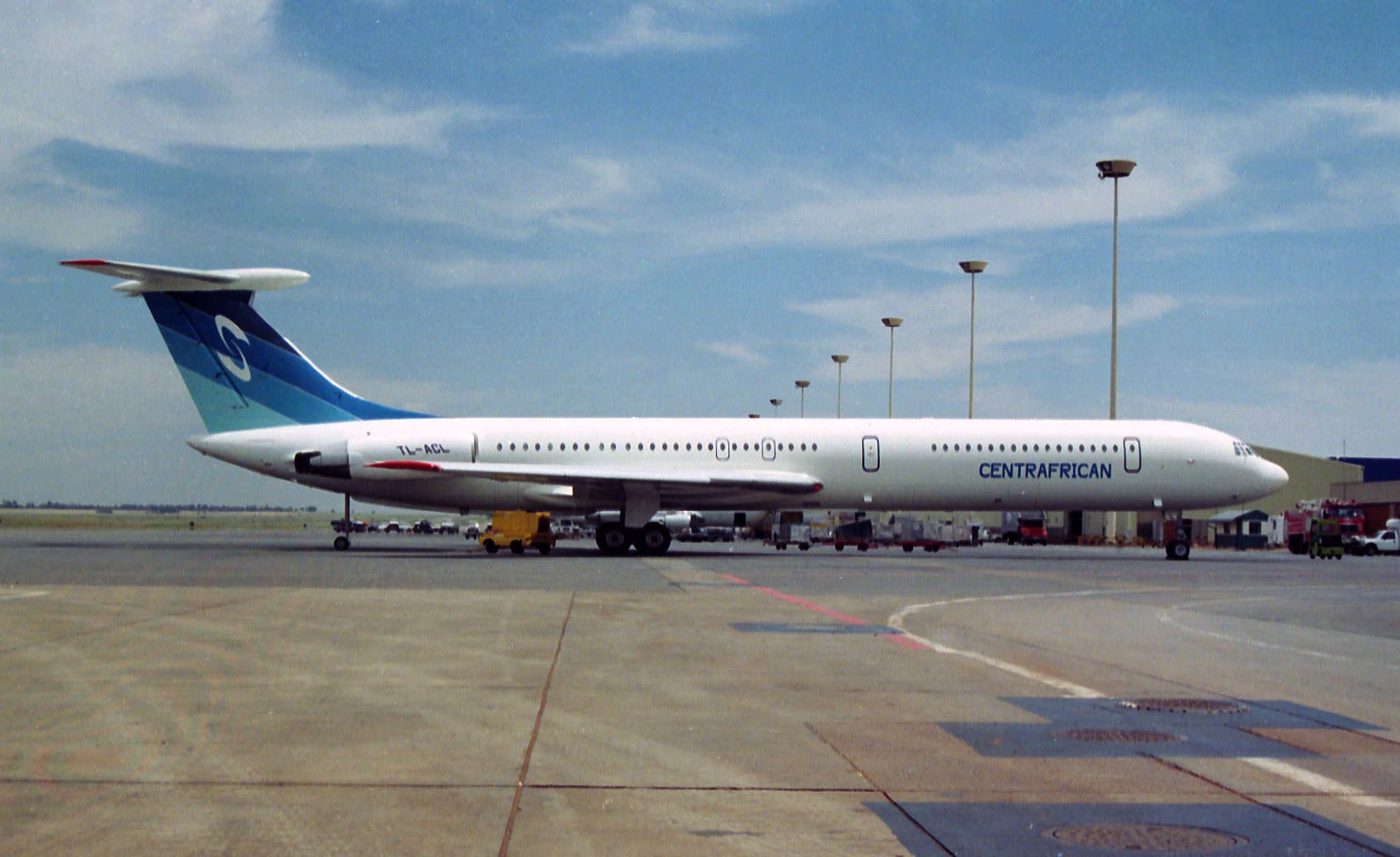
- An Ilyushin IL 62 of Centrafrican Airlines
IATA	ICAO	Call sign
CG	CET	CENTAFRICAN
- Ceased operations: 2000s (possibly under Trans African name)
- Headquarters: Ajman freezone

Centafrican Airlines was a Central African-based airline. The airline was one of the ventures owned by Viktor Bout and was one of the owners of the Umm Al Quwain Ilyushin Il-76. It also bought aircraft from companies such as Ghostbuster and Air Pass. Its AOC, which later possibly then became an airline called Trans African, was revoked in 2000. Its assets were transferred to an airline called CET Aviation.

== Fleet ==
- TU 154
- AN 32
- AN 26
- YAK 40
- AN 12
- AN 74
- AN 8

== Accidents and incidents ==
- On October 24, 1998, an Antonov An-12 crashed in Lubutu on a flight to of Kigali killing all 3 occupants on board the aircraft, the aircraft was not supposed to be near Lubutu.
- On May 19, 1999, a Centafrican Airlines Yakovlev Yak-40 overran the runway in Berberati on a scheduled flight. The aircraft was severely damaged, but all 33 occupants onboard survived.
- On April 9, 2000, an Antonov An-8 operated by the airline flying from Pepa to Kigali crashed, killing all 24 people.
- On October 6, 2000, an Antonov An-72 of Centafrican Airlines encountered atmospheric turbulences which then saw the aircraft go too high and too fast leading to a go around. On the second approach, the gear was not lowered and the aircraft crashed.
