= Tupolev Tu-91 =

Prototype two-seat Soviet attack aircraft

Tu-91

General information
- Type: Naval attack aircraft
- National origin: Soviet Union
- Manufacturer: Tupolev OKB
- Status: Prototype only
- Number built: 2

History
- First flight: 17 May 1955

The Tupolev Tu-91 (NATO reporting name Boot) was a two-seat Soviet attack aircraft built during the 1950s. It was initially designed as a carrier-borne aircraft, but was converted into a land-based aircraft after Joseph Stalin's death in 1953 cancelled the aircraft carriers being designed. Two prototypes had been built and production had been approved by the Soviet Navy when it was inspected by the General Secretary, Nikita Khrushchev, in 1956. He remarked how ridiculous the Tu-91 looked and the program was cancelled.

== Development ==
Following the end of World War II in 1945, Stalin ordered an aggressive naval expansion to counter the American naval superiority. The expansion called for building a large number of warships oriented around battleships and other heavy ships, with aircraft carriers limited to a supporting role, despite Admiral of the Fleet Nikolai Kuznetsov, Commander-in-chief of the Soviet Navy, pushing for carriers. Stalin restored him to command of the navy in 1951, after having demoted him four years before, and Kuznetsov attempted to persuade him of the value of the carrier in 1952, but Stalin refused to make a decision before his death the following year.

Kuznetsov had ordered preliminary design work to begin on the Project 85 light aircraft carrier and the aircraft for the ship before Stalin's death, although the ship was never more than a paper design. This allowed the Tupolev Design bureau to decide upon on a single-engined turboprop aircraft to meet Soviet Naval Aviation's requirement for a long-range strike aircraft, capable of attacking targets with bombs or torpedoes. The new leaders of the Soviet Union rejected proposals for carriers and the Council of Ministers issued a requirement for a land-based bomber powered by a Kuznetsov TV-2 turboprop engine that was capable of level and dive bombing attacks on targets with bombs, torpedoes, rockets, gunfire and naval mines, in addition to coastal reconnaissance missions, on 29 April 1953. This forced the bureau to revise the design to eliminate the wing-folding mechanism, arresting gear and other carrier-specific equipment for the second prototype.

The Tu-91 first flew on 17 May 1955, when the manufacturer's flight testing began. They concluded successfully about September with the test pilots concluding that the aircraft was highly manoeuverable, although barrel rolls should be forbidden. The aircraft also passed the subsequent state testing and the design bureau began preparing for production at Factory No. 31, in Tbilisi, Georgia. (Note: Historians Yefim Gordon and Vladimir Rigman state that the first flight was made on 2 September 1954 with manufacturer's testing concluded on 21 January 1955.) The Tu-91 was part of a display of the latest military aircraft for the Soviet leadership in mid-1956, one of the very few propeller-driven aircraft present. When the newly elected Khrushchev inquired about the aircraft, the officer detailed to the aircraft misspoke, stating that it could do the job of a heavy cruiser rather than it had the firepower of that ship. Khrushchev replied, "But nobody needs heavy cruisers any more", and commented how ridiculous it looked. This off-hand comment caused the program to be cancelled.

== Description ==
The Tu-91 was a duralumin low-winged monoplane with dihedral wings built from three spars. The wing consisted of three sections, two outer panels and the center section that housed four fuel tanks and the tricycle landing gear. Control surfaces on the outer panels consisted of manually tabbed ailerons and slotted flaps. The aircraft had a conventional tail structure with vertical and horizontal stabilisers. The engine was mounted mid-fuselage above the wing spars, driving a six-bladed contra-rotating propeller in the nose via a long shaft that passed through the cockpit. Providing sufficient air to the engine required a lot of development time that eventually included replacing an engine on a Tupolev Tu-4LL flying testbed with a mockup of the Tu-91's nose with a working TV-2 installation. The solution adopted consisted of three air intakes: a chin inlet and two cheek inlets below the cockpit that met in a plenum chamber forward of the engine. The engine exhausted through a bifurcated exhaust duct that exited the sides of the fuselage aft of the wing.

The crew of two sat side by side in a cockpit in the aircraft's nose, enclosed in an armour "bathtub" that consisted of 8-to-18-millimetre (0.3 to 0.7 in) ANBA-1 light alloy armour. All of the panels in the two canopies were bulletproof except for those directly overhead. In addition to the forward fuel tanks, there were another pair of tanks located between the exhaust ducts, all of which self sealing and filled with inert gases. The internal armament of the Tu-91 consisted of a pair of 23 mm (0.91 in) NR-23 cannon located in the wing roots and another pair of NR-23s in a DK-15 powered tail turret that were remotely controlled by the aircraft's navigator using a periscopic gunsight mounted externally above the cockpit. The aircraft could be fitted with five plyons, one under the fuselage and the others under the wings. These could carry a single torpedo or various bombs, rockets and mines up to a total weight of 1,500 kilograms (3,300 lb). Two of the wing pylons were plumbed to carry drop tanks in addition to weapons. A camera was fitted in the rear fuselage for reconnaissance missions.

== Specifications (Tu-91) ==
Data from The Osprey Encyclopedia of Russian Aircraft 1875–1995.

General characteristics

- Crew: 2 (pilot and observer)
- Length: 17.7 m (58 ft 1 in)
- Wingspan: 16.4 m (53 ft 10 in)
- Height: 5.06 m (16 ft 7 in)
- Wing area: 47.5 m^{2} (511 sq ft)
- Empty weight: 8,000 kg (17,637 lb)
- Max takeoff weight: 14,400 kg (31,747 lb)
- Powerplant: 1 × Kuznetsov TV-2M turboprop engine, 5,709 kW (7,656 hp)
- Propellers: 6-bladed contra-rotating propeller, 5.7 m (18 ft 8 in) diameter

Performance

- Maximum speed: 800 km/h (500 mph, 430 kn)
- Cruise speed: 250–300 km/h (160–190 mph, 130–160 kn)
- Range: 2,350 km (1,460 mi, 1,270 nmi)
- Service ceiling: 11,000 m (36,000 ft)

Armament

- Guns:

- 2 × 23 mm (0.91 in) NR-23 cannon with 100 rounds each in wing roots
- 2 × 23 mm (0.91 in) NR-23 cannon with 150 rounds with in a tail turret

- Bombs: up to 1,500 kg (3,300 lb) of bombs, rockets or a single torpedo

== See also ==
Aircraft of comparable role, configuration, and era

- Breguet Alizé
- Douglas A2D Skyshark
- Fairey Gannet
- Short Seamew

Related lists

- List of attack aircraft
- List of military aircraft of the Soviet Union and the CIS

== Bibliography ==
- Duffy, Paul & Kandalov, Andrei (1996). Tupolev: The Man and His Aircraft. Shrewsbury, UK: Airlife. ISBN 1-85310-728-X.
- Gordon, Yefim & Rigmant, Vladimir (2005). OKB Tupolev: A History of the Design Bureau and its Aircraft. Hinckley, UK: Midland Publishing. ISBN 1-85780-214-4.
- Gunston, Bill (1995a). Tupolev Aircraft since 1922. Annapolis, Maryland: Naval Institute Press. ISBN 1-55750-882-8.
- Gunston, Bill (1995b). The Osprey Encyclopedia of Russian Aircraft 1875–1995. London: Osprey. ISBN 1-85532-405-9.
- Rohwer, Jürgen & Monakov, Mikhail S. (2001). Stalin's Ocean-Going Fleet: Soviet Naval Strategy and Shipbuilding Programs 1935–1953. London: Frank Cass. ISBN 0-7146-4895-7.
