= Antonov An-8 =

Soviet transport aircraft

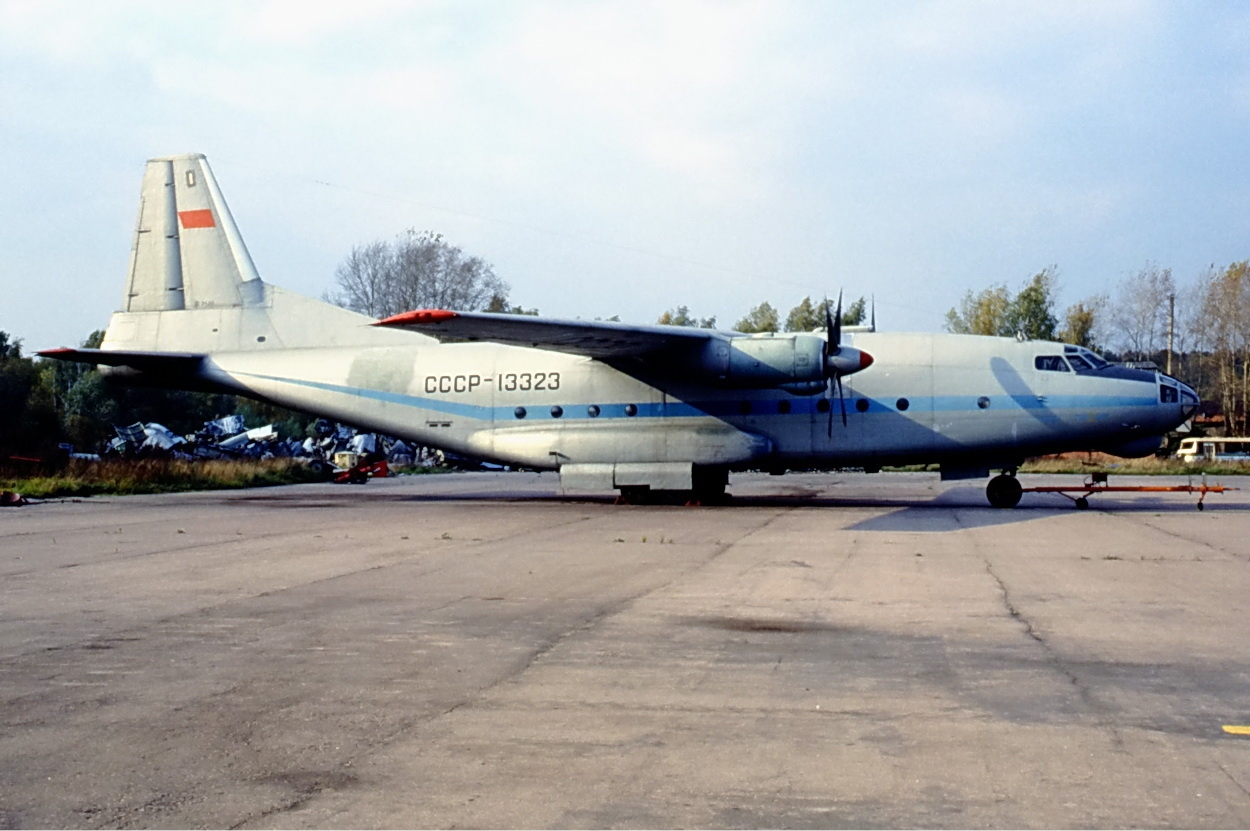
- An-8 of Aeroflot in 1992

General information
- Type: Military transport aircraft
- Manufacturer: Antonov
- Status: Retired
- Primary users: Soviet Air Force Aeroflot
- Number built: ~151

History
- Manufactured: 1956-1961
- Introduction date: 1958
- First flight: 11 February 1956
- Developed into: Antonov An-10

The Antonov An-8 (NATO reporting name: Camp) is a Soviet-designed twin-turboprop, high-wing light military transport aircraft.

== Development ==
In December 1951, OKB-153 initiated the design of a twin-engined assault transport aircraft, designated DT-5/8 (Desahntno-Trahnsportnyy [samolyot] – assault transport aircraft), to be powered by two Kuznetsov TV-2 turboprop engines, and fitted with a large rear cargo door to allow vehicles to be driven straight into the hold. On 11 December 1953, the Soviet Council of Ministers issued directive No.2922-1251 to the Antonov OKB, requiring them to build a twin-turboprop transport aircraft derived from the DT-5/8. Bearing the in-house designation Izdeliye P the resulting aircraft had a high wing carrying two turboprop engines, atop a rectangular-section fuselage which could carry 60 troops or 40 passengers. Alternatively. the aircraft could carry a range of vehicles (including ASU-57 assault guns, BTR-40 or BTR-152 armoured personnel carriers) or artillery pieces. The aircraft was fitted with a tricycle undercarriage with main gear units housed in pods on either side of the fuselage, and an upswept rear fuselage providing clearance of the tail unit for loading and unloading.

The aircraft made its first flight on 11 February 1956 from Sviatoshyn Airfield, Kyiv and made its public debut at the Aviation Day air display at Tushino Airfield on 18 August that year. Following State acceptance trials, production was not recommended due to poor spin characteristics, directional stability and control issues, nosewheel shimmy, poor controllability when landing in crosswinds above 6 m/s (12 kn) and also phugoid oscillations in all three axes which were difficult to control and made piloting the prototype tiring. As well as the aerodynamic faults, the TV-2 engines were unsuitable, being unstable at high altitudes and difficult to start, as well as having a short service life.

The Antonov OKB set about rectifying these faults with increased-area vertical and horizontal tail surfaces, anti-spin strakes on the upper rear fuselage sides, deleting the wing leading-edge slats, adding local structural reinforcements and replacing the TV-2 engines with Ivchenko AI-20D turboprop engines, which had the added benefit of reducing the empty weight by 3 tonnes (6,600 lb). These changes resulted in the modified aircraft being ordered into production at the GAZ-34 factory in Tashkent. The new design required the use of new production techniques, such as stamping and forging of large high-strength parts, extrusion of long sections, chemical milling of large skin panels and other new techniques.

Given the service designation An-8, the new transport was built in the GAZ-34 factory in Tashkent from 1957 to 1961, as a larger-capacity replacement for the earlier Lisunov Li-2 (DC-3), with a large unpressurized hold, a manned tail gun position, chin radome for navigation/mapping radar and a glazed nose for the navigator. A total of 151 An-8s were built in Tashkent.

== Operational history ==
The first production aircraft was rolled out in December 1958 incorporating de-rated AI-20D engines, (the initial production AI-20D was found to be incapable of delivering the specified power), modified undercarriage control systems, fuel vents, pressurization and de-icing systems, as well as thicker gauge skin in the propeller plane of rotation and increased rudder range of movement.

The majority of An-8s built served in the Soviet Air Forces, with two An-8s being used to land special forces to seize Plzeň airport during the Invasion of Czechoslovakia in 1968. Others were used as electronic reconnaissance aircraft, and one aircraft was used for air sampling following Chinese nuclear testing in 1966. They continued in large-scale use on frontline military duties in the Soviet Air Force until the 1970s, when many were later transferred to Aeroflot for use as freighters. Following a series of accidents in the early 1990s, the An-8 was withdrawn from use in Russia. This did not mean the end of the An-8, however as a number were sold overseas with a few aircraft observed flying in the Middle East and in Africa, particularly Liberia, DR Congo and Angola until around 2010, (especially airlines associated with the Russian businessman and convicted arms dealer Viktor Bout), despite Antonov having withdrawn the airworthiness certificate and support for the type in 2004, ending legal use of the aircraft.

== Variants ==
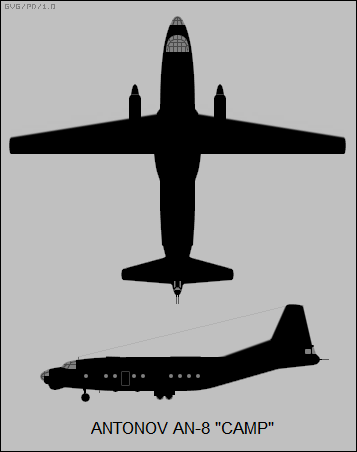
Silhouette two-view of the Antonov An-8

Izdeliye P
Antonov OKB in-house designation for the first prototype.
Izdeliye N
Antonov OKB in-house designation for a projected airliner version with a pressurised circular section cabin accommodating up to 57 passengers.
An-8
The initial production version.
An-8M
(Morskoy – marine) Projected Anti-Submarine Warfare variant.
An-8T
(Toplivovoz – fuel tanker/carrier) A fuel transporter used for all kinds of automotive fuels, as well as aircraft and rocket fuels, including two 5,300 litre (1,100 imp gal) tanks for petroleum products, or a single 5,000 litre tank for rocket oxidizers like red fuming nitric acid (RFNA), nitric acid, or a liquid oxygen flask.
An-8RU
(Raketnymi Ooskoritelyami – with rocket boosters) One aircraft fitted in 1964 with two rocket boosters to increase the single engined MTOW to 42 tonnes (93,000 lb). This project was abandoned after the crash of the first prototype during trials.
An-8Sh
(Shtoormanskiy – for navigators) A projected Navigator trainer.
An-8PS
(Poiskovo-Spasahtel'nyy – search and rescue) A projected maritime search and rescue aircraft.

== Operators ==
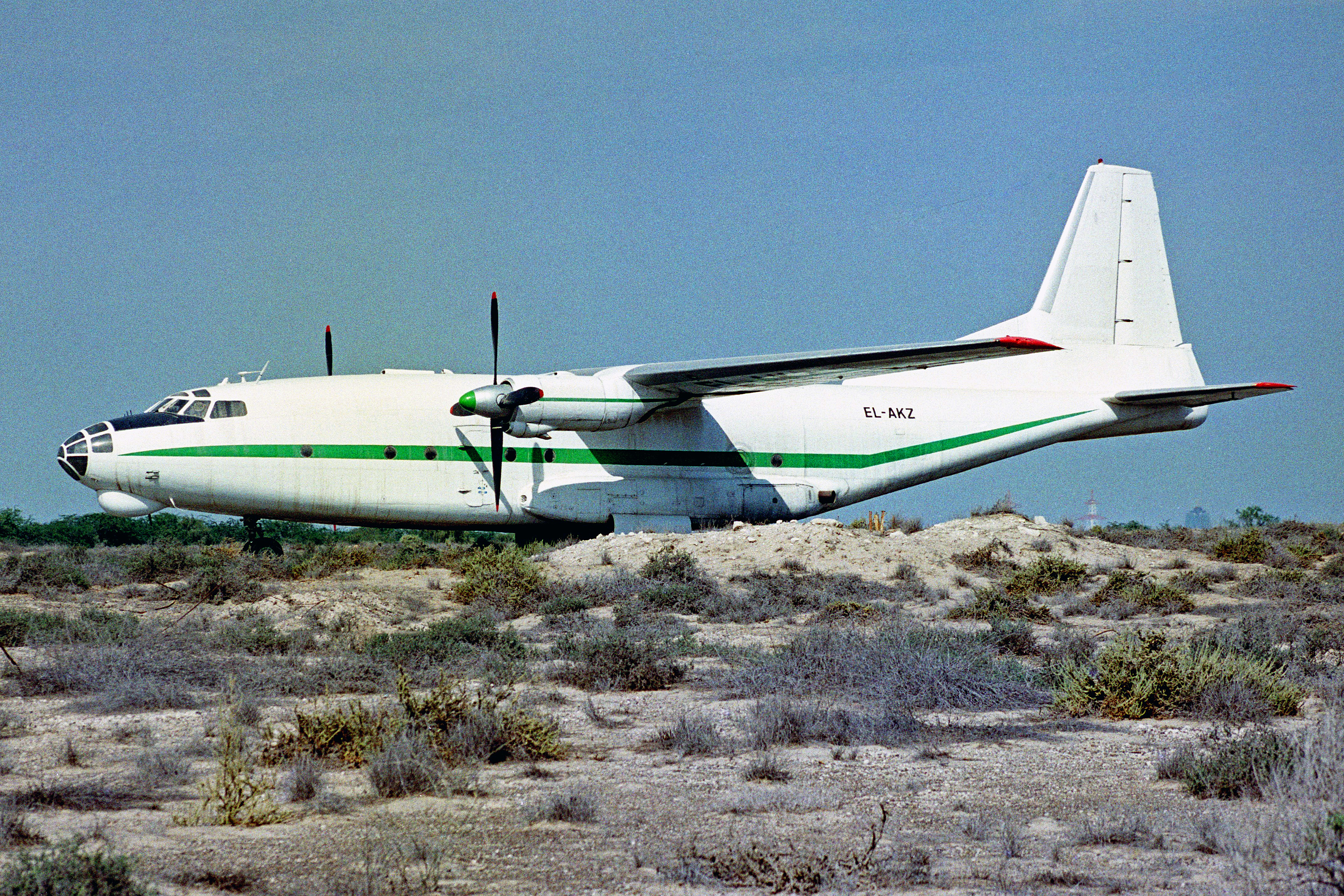
Ex- Santa Cruz Imperial An-8 at Sharjah airport

Central African Republic

- Centrafrican Airlines

Sri Lanka

- Sky Cabs

Indonesia

- Air Mark

Rwanda

- Rwandan Air Force

Soviet Union

- ATRAN
- Aeroflot
- Soviet Air Force

United Arab Emirates

- Air Cess
- Santa Cruz Imperial

Ukraine

- Ukrainian Sea Guard

== Accidents and incidents ==
- On 19 April, 2000, a Rwandan Air Force Antonov An-8, TL-ACM, chartered from Centrafrican Airlines, crashed near Pepa, Democratic Republic of the Congo after engine failure caused by a suspected bird strike. All 24 on board were killed.

== Specifications ==
Data from Airlife's World Aircraft

General characteristics

- Crew: 6 (pilot, copilot, navigator, flight engineer, tail gunner, wireless operator)
- Capacity: 48 persons / 11,000 kg (24,000 lb) max payload
- Length: 26 m (85 ft 4 in)
- Wingspan: 30 m (98 ft 5 in)
- Height: 9.7 m (31 ft 10 in)
- Wing area: 117.2 m^{2} (1,262 sq ft)
- Aspect ratio: 11.7
- Empty weight: 21,250 kg (46,848 lb)
- Max takeoff weight: 40,000 kg (88,185 lb)
- Powerplant: 2 × Ivchenko AI-20D turboprop engines, 3,860 kW (5,180 shp) each
- Propellers: 4-bladed constant-speed propellers

Performance

- Maximum speed: 610 km/h (380 mph, 330 kn)
- Cruise speed: 480 km/h (300 mph, 260 kn)
- Range: 2,780 km (1,730 mi, 1,500 nmi)
- Service ceiling: 9,600 m (31,500 ft)
- Rate of climb: 7.12 m/s (1,402 ft/min)

Armament

- Guns: One 23 mm cannon in the tail turret.

== See also ==
- Antonov An-10
- Antonov An-12

Aircraft of comparable role, configuration, and era

- de Havilland Canada DHC-4 Caribou
- Fairchild C-123 Provider

Related lists

- List of military aircraft of the Soviet Union and the CIS
