= Sky Cabs =

IATA	ICAO	Call sign
2E	SCB	SKYCABS
- Founded: 1991
- Commenced operations: 1993
- Ceased operations: 2000
- Hubs: Bandaranaike International Airport
- Headquarters: Colombo, Sri Lanka

Sky Cabs (Pvt.) Ltd. was a cargo airline from Sri Lanka, which was headquartered at Bandaranaike International Airport, Colombo and had approximately 50 employees.

== History ==
The company was registered on 1 November 1991 and was issued an operating licence in 1993. Sky Cabs offered scheduled and chartered international freight transport using a fleet of Antonov An-8 and An-12 aircraft. The following destinations were served on a regular, scheduled basis:

== Terminated destinations ==
Country-city	Airport code		Airport name	Notes	Refs
Country-city	IATA	ICAO	Airport name	Notes	Refs
Bahrain
Bahrain	BAH	OBBI	Bahrain International Airport	Terminated	
India
Calicut	CCJ	VOCL	Calicut International Airport	Terminated	
Goa	GOI	VOGO	Goa International Airport	Terminated	
Mumbai	BOM	VABB	Chhatrapati Shivaji International Airport	Terminated	
Trivandrum	TRV	VOTV	Trivandrum International Airport	Terminated	
Maldives
Gan	GAN	VRMG	Gan International Airport	Terminated	
Oman
Muscat	MCT	OOMS	Muscat International Airport	Terminated	
Pakistan
Lahore	LHE	OPLA	Allama Iqbal International Airport	Terminated	
Sri Lanka
Colombo	CMB	VCBI	Bandaranaike International Airport	Terminated	

=== Formerly operated ===
Aircraft	Fleet	Introduced	Retired
Antonov An-8	1	TBA	TBA
Antonov An-12	1	TBA	TBA

== Subsequent closure ==
Investigation into the accident revealed a number of procedural failures, including the fact that the aircraft had been operated without a valid licence.

As a consequence, all international cargo airlines of Sri Lanka were grounded and had to be reassessed. Sky Cabs failed this procedure, and was subsequently shut down.

== Accidents and incidents ==
- On March 24, 2000, Sky Cabs Flight 702 from Bangkok crashed into a housing area near Bandaranaike International Airport due to fuel starvation. Three people on the ground were killed, as well as six of the eight occupants on board the Antonov An-12 (registered RA-11302).
