= Douglas Farah =

American journalist

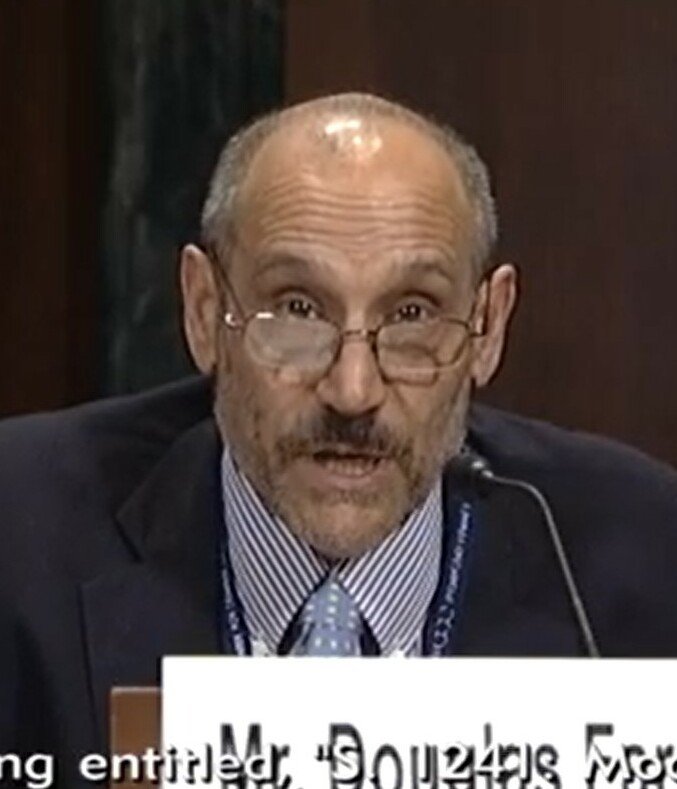
- Farah in 2017
- Born: July 22, 1957 (age 69)
- Education: University of Kansas
- Occupations: Journalist, author, and consultant
- Awards: 1988 Sigma Delta Chi Distinguished Service Award for Foreign Correspondence
- Website: douglasfarah.org

Douglas Farah is an American journalist, author and national security consultant. Farah served as United Press International bureau chief in El Salvador from 1985 to 1987, and worked as a freelance journalist for The Washington Post, Newsweek, and other publications until being hired as a staff correspondent for The Washington Post in 1992.

While working for the Post, Farah served as bureau chief of Central American and the Caribbean until 1997, international investigative reporter between 1998 and 2000, and of West Africa between 2000 and 2003. He left the Post in 2004, and has since authored two books and served as a contributor to peer-reviewed publications such as the Journal of International Affairs and analysis pieces for Foreign Policy and the Center for Strategic and International Studies (CSIS).

== Career ==
=== Early career ===
Farah was born on July 22, 1957, and spent his childhood traveling the world with his missionary parents. In 1974, he graduated the American Cooperative School in La Paz. After traveling around Latin America and working in rural development, Farah began attending the University of Kansas in 1980. He graduated in 1985 with a B.A. in Latin American studies and a B.S. in journalism. During this time he worked for United Press International, and upon graduation he was appointed as UPI bureau chief in El Salvador, a position he held until 1987.

In El Salvador his reporting covered the civil war and human rights atrocities, including coverage of the paramilitary death squads activities and the 1989 murder of six Jesuit priests. Other reporting included the use of political amnesty to free the Salvadorians who were suspected of murdering U.S. missionaries, the political gamesmanship of Salvadorian president Jose Duarte, the extortion of the country's high ranking civil servants, natural disasters in the region, such as earthquakes, and the expulsion of foreign nationals from the country.

=== The Washington Post ===
In 1988 Farah was the recipient of the Sigma Delta Chi Distinguished Service Award for Foreign Correspondence, for a series of articles he wrote on death squads in El Salvador for The Washington Post. He also moved to Colombia to report on the drug wars in Colombia, Venezuela, Ecuador and Bolivia—specifically the period of influence for Pablo Escobar. In 1992, after serving as a freelance reporter for several newspapers, Farah became a foreign affairs correspondent for The Washington Post. Soon afterwards he had been the bureau chief for Central American and the Caribbean until 1997. In 2000 he was again named bureau chief, this time as chief of West Africa, a position he held until 2003.

He reported on many different international affairs issues and civil war conflicts, including the economic reforms in Cuba, the inflation of significant corruption among public officials as well as the civil war in Sierre Leone, the military dictatorship in Haiti, the Aristide and Preval era in Haiti, dictator Charles Taylor and his ties in the blood diamond trade to al Qaeda terrorists, American sanctions against Libya, US military involvement in Colombia, and Russian organized crime. Farah left the Post in 2004.

=== Books and publications after Washington Post ===
Farah has been occasionally contributing to Foreign Policy, covering issues including Hugo Chavez in Venezuela and Muammar Gaddafi in Libya. He was also a contributor to the Counterterrorism Blog between 2005 and 2011. Farah published articles in Prism and at the end of 2012 Farah published the article Central American Gangs: Changing Nature and New Partners in the Winter 2012 issue of the Journal of International Affairs.

In terms of longer works, upon leaving the Post in 2004 Farah published the book Blood from Stones: The Secret Financial Network of Terror, based upon the stories he broke regarding the ties between al-Qaeda and West African blood diamonds. The book also covered the story of how Farah had to leave the region due to death-threats and was welcomed back to America by a CIA. The book highlights the fact his revelation of the fact that international affairs material are unknown to the governments of the countries involved, led to him being attacked by numerous intelligence services.

Farah also co-authored the book Merchant of Death: Money, Guns, Planes, and the Man Who Makes War Possible with Stephen Braun. The book tells the story of the international weapons dealer Viktor Bout, and was released a year before Bout was arrested in a DEA sting. The book detailed how Bout was able to deliver weapons to the deviant groups and nations, including militants in the Taliban, Somalia, and Yemen. Publishers Weekly wrote that "the authors paint a depressing picture of an avalanche of war-making material pouring into poor, violence-wracked nations despite well-publicized U.N. embargoes."

=== Consultation business ===
Farah has been interviewed regarding international relations and criminal issues for decades. Following September 11 attacks, he was interviewed by international newspapers regarding the link between African diamonds and terrorist financing. Farah is the principal and owner of IBI "Consultants, LLC", which describes itself as "offer[ing] a broad range of expertise and access across Latin America on issues of national security, transnational crime, terrorism, terror finance and non-state armed actors". He has been featured on national broadcast stations as an expert in the field of national security issues, including on CNN. Farah is a resident expert for the Woodrow Wilson International Center for Scholars in the fields of organized crime, drugs, Latin America, and Central America.

As of 2013, Farah was a Senior Fellow of Financial Investigations and Transparency at the International Assessment of Strategy Center. He is also an adjunct fellow at the Center for Strategic and International Studies. Farah has testified before the US Congress on a number of times. For example, on October 1, 2009, Farah testified before the House Committee on Oversight and Government Reform Subcommittee on National Security and Foreign Affairs on the subject of "Transnational Drug Enterprises: Threats to Global Stability and U.S. National Security from Southwest Asia, Latin American and West Africa". On July 7, 2011, Farah testified before the House Committee on Homeland Security Subcommittee on Counterterrorism and Intelligence on the subject of "Hezbollah in Latin America: Implications for U.S. Security".

== Media appearances ==
Farah appeared on The Daily Show with Jon Stewart on September 13, 2007. He has been interviewed on Univision and CNN. Farah was also interviewed by Terry Gross on her NPR radio show Fresh Air in 2004 and 2007, as well as on other NPR radio programs and radio programs on additional networks.
