= Air Cess =

Cargo airline based in Sharjah, United Arab Emirates

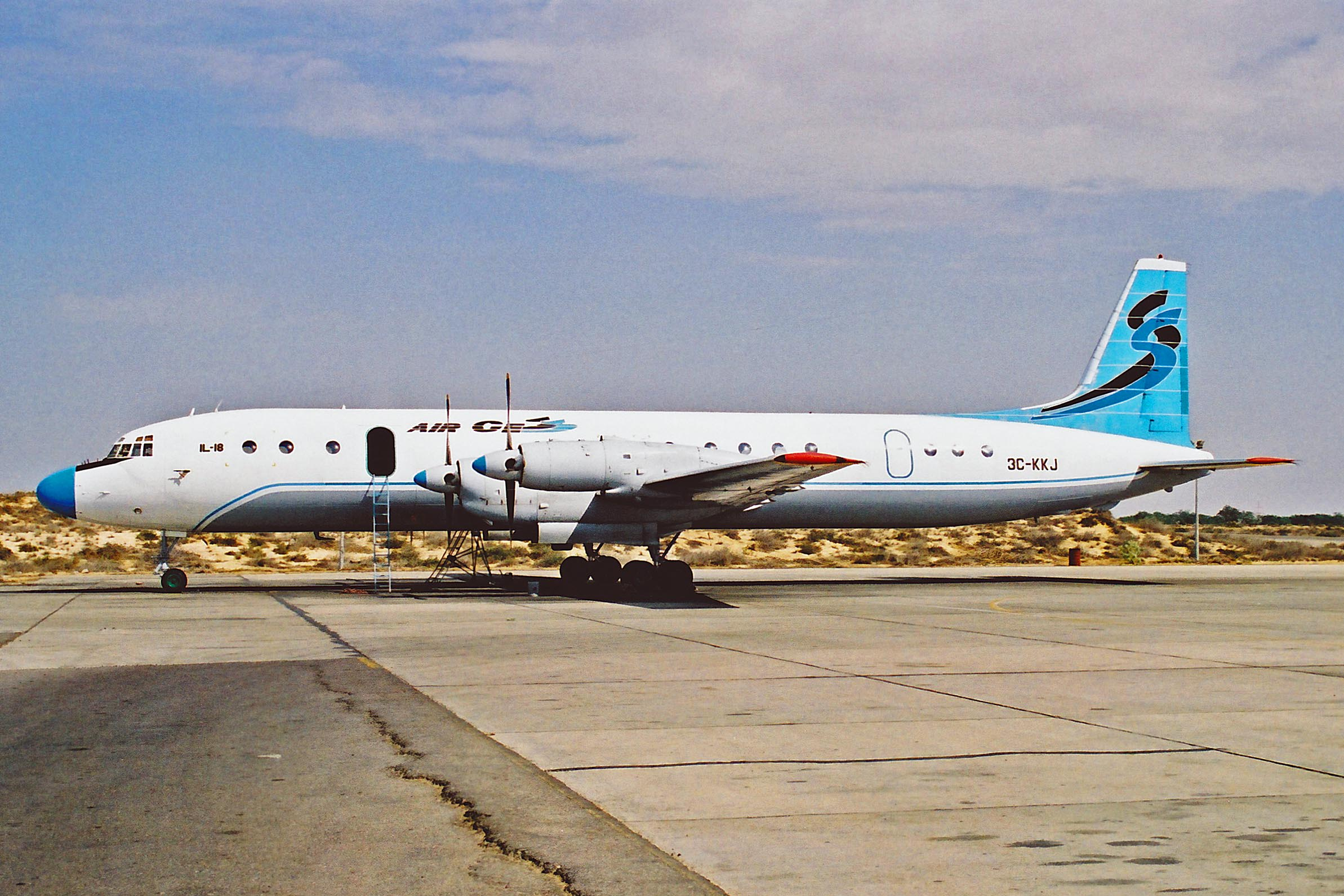
IATA	ICAO	Call sign
—	ACS	—
- Operating bases: Sharjah Airport, United Arab Emirates
- Fleet size: 5 (as at August 2006)

Air Cess was a cargo airline based in Sharjah, United Arab Emirates. It was founded by Russian arms dealer Viktor Bout.

== Code data ==
- ICAO Code: ACS (not current)

== Fleet ==
The Air Cess fleet included the following aircraft in August 2006:

- 1 Antonov An-12
- 2 Antonov An-24
- 1 Antonov An-26
- 1 Antonov An-72

The fleet also included the Umm Al Quwain Ilyushin Il-76.
