= Sarkis Soghanalian =

Armenian-Lebanese arms dealer

- Soghanalian in 1991
- Born: Սարգիս Սողանալեան; February 6, 1929; İskenderun, Sanjak of Alexandretta (present-day İskenderun, Hatay Province, Turkey)
- Died: October 5, 2011 (aged 82); Hialeah, Florida, U.S.
- Known for: Convictions for arms trafficking, conspiracy of shipping unauthorized weapons

Sarkis Garabed Soghanalian (Armenian: Սարգիս Կարապետ Սողանալեան; February 6, 1929 – October 5, 2011), nicknamed the Merchant of Death, was a Syrian-Lebanese-Armenian international private arms dealer who gained fame for being the "Cold War's largest arms merchant" and the lead seller of firearms and weaponry to the former government of Iraq under Saddam Hussein during the 1980s.

Soghanalian was contracted by the Central Intelligence Agency to sell arms to help Iraq during the Iran–Iraq War. With the encouragement of the Reagan Administration and the backing of American intelligence agencies, he oversaw the transaction of several significant arms deals. Aside from Iraq, he also sold weapons to groups in Mauritania, Lebanon, and Latin America.

On the eve of the Persian Gulf War, Soghanalian spoke publicly about his activities during the Iran-Iraq War. This led to a federal indictment by the Justice Department. He was found guilty and sentenced to jail. He was given an early release when he helped the Clinton administration to attempt break up of a counterfeiting ring in Lebanon. In 2001 he was arrested once more by the US government on bank fraud charges, but was released a year later after revelations of further weapons transactions deals between the CIA and Peru.

== Early life ==
Soghanalian was born in 1929 to an Armenian family in what was then French mandate Syrian Iskanderun (now part of Turkey). In late 1939, his family moved to Lebanon. Due to the poor economic conditions his family lived in at the time, he decided to drop out of high school and joined the French Army and served in a tank division. It was from his experience in the military that brought him into the world of weaponry and, in his words, he "adapted to it from childhood and kept going".

Soghanalian later took up a job as a ski instructor in Lebanon, where he met and married his American wife.

== Initial arms deals ==
=== Beginnings ===
Soghanalian was introduced to the world of arms trade in the beginning of the 1970s. He sold his first consignment of firearms in 1973 (mainly consisting of American weaponry). However, he was soon able to procure weaponry from a number of Eastern bloc countries including Bulgaria, Hungary and Poland. The arms consisted largely of small arms and infantry weapons. After the Lebanese Civil War, he branched out his arms operations to other countries, supplying the Christian Phalange militia in Lebanon, various factions in Ecuador, Mauritania and Nicaragua, and Mobutu Sese Seko's Zaire, to Argentina during the Falklands War, and to Saddam Hussein. He was even able to procure an American C-130 Hercules transport plane for Libya's Muammar al-Gaddafi.

=== Iraq ===
According to an interview he gave years later, the United States was fully aware of Soghanalian's operations when he began obtaining weapons for Iraq. He quipped "The Americans knew what I was doing, every minute, every hour. If I drank a glass of water, they were aware of it and what kind of water it was." He had struck up and maintained a largely cordial relationship with the United States ever since the Lebanon crisis of 1958. American intelligence officials had described him as a cooperative and reliable source in Lebanon, making him an ideal candidate to conduct the arms deal with Iraq. With the beginning of the Iran–Iraq War in 1980, he began to sell weapons to Iraq with the blessing of the United States. Since there was an arms embargo placed against Iraq, the weapons were funneled through various countries. His most significant deal came when he procured French 155mm self-propelled howitzers (valued at an estimated $1.4 billion).

Iraqi leaders had initially approached the Reagan administration to purchase American 175mm artillery, but had been turned down. They were, however, encouraged by American officials to procure the weapons through private arms dealers. The Iraqi officials appealed to Soghanalian, then based in Miami, Florida, who in turn approached several European governments. He found French leader François Mitterrand inclined to conducting the transaction so long as the deal was kept secret, since Iran was holding French hostages at the time, and France did not wish to antagonize it. The U.S. encouraged Mitterrand to approve the sale, nicknamed the "Vulcan," as it passed through a complex set of transactions.

Soghanalian defended the sales when they were later revealed on the eve of the Gulf War, in January 1991. He stated that, "We didn't give him those weapons to fight U.S. forces. The weapons were given to him to fight the common enemy [Iran] at that time. Which he did. There was no need to have direct confrontation with him and endanger American troops." His other transactions to Iraq also included artillery from South Africa, which he routed through Austria as a "middle man," to bypass United Nations sanctions. Soghanalian helped sell to the Iraqi army military uniforms worth $280,000,000 from Romania.

In an interview with 60 Minutes, Soghanalian stated that top-level American officials were aware from the beginning of his deals in Iraq. These included former U.S. President Richard Nixon, former Vice-President Spiro Agnew, Nixon chief of staff Colonel Jack Brennan and attorney general John N. Mitchell. Encouraged by other senior officials, Nixon had written a letter on his behalf to expedite the sale of uniforms to Iraq. Soghanalian remarked that "They were not only in the uniform business. They would sell their mothers if they could, just to make the money." He predicted that the ensuing war between Coalition troops and Iraq would turn into a lengthy and costly conflict, much like the Iran–Iraq War.

== Arrest and conviction ==
Soghanalian's testimony exposed the role of American government officials in the illicit arms trade. Members of Congress noted that his revelations had been found to be "extremely disturbing to every American. They are disturbing to Mr. Soghanalian. He gives a first-hand description of official and unofficial American involvement in the enormous buildup of arms to Saddam Hussein."

His testimony led the Justice Department under George H. W. Bush administration to file federal charges against him in 1991. He was convicted on six counts for possession of armaments and intent to sell to Iraq. The weapons included 103 helicopter gunships from the Hughes Helicopters corporation and two rocket-propelled grenade launchers from a 1983 deal. A year later, he was fined $20,000 and sentenced to six years in prison. In 1993 his sentence was reduced to two years. Although the exact reasons remain unknown, his attorney stated that Soghanalian had cooperated with U.S. law enforcement officials in an ultimately unsuccessful attempt to break up a $100 billion counterfeiting operation in the Bekaa valley in Lebanon. In 1995, after he was released, he moved to France and opened offices there and in Amman, Jordan.

== Peru ==
In 1999 Soghanalian arranged for an air drop of 10,000 AK-47 assault rifles, originally from East Germany and Jordan, intended for use by the Peruvian government but most of it fell into the possession of the Colombian leftist guerrilla organization FARC, which were opposed to the US-backed government of Colombia. Soghanalian had been able to purchase the rifles for $55 apiece in addition to a $20 transportation, and "shipping and handling" fee. Several months later, it was revealed that the CIA had backed the deal to arm Peruvian intelligence head Vladimiro Montesinos.

== Philanthropy ==
Though known for his role in the global arms trade, Soghanalian also used his resources to dispatch 26 planes to deliver humanitarian relief to the Soviet Union in the wake of the devastating earthquake that hit Spitak, Soviet Armenia in 1988. For his efforts, President George H. W. Bush described him as an individual who "strengthened the ties that unite mankind," while Mother Teresa wrote him a letter, stating that God would reward him and his family's efforts a "hundredfold."

== In popular culture ==
Soghanalian was one of the inspirations for the character of Yuri Orlov in the 2005 film Lord of War. Orlov was a composite of real life arms dealers, including Soghanalian and Victor Bout.

== Personal life and death ==
Soghanalian was fluent in English, Armenian, Arabic, French and Turkish and “could make himself understood” in Spanish and Italian. He had two children.

Soghanalian died on October 5, 2011, at the Hialeah Hospital in Hialeah, Florida.

== See also ==
- Viktor Bout
