= List of Cyborg 009 chapters =

Cyborg 009 is a manga series written and illustrated by Shotaro Ishinomori. It has been published by many Japanese magazines, including Monthly Shōnen King, Weekly Shōnen Magazine, Shōnen Big Comic, COM, Shōjo Comic, Weekly Shōnen Sunday, Monthly Shōnen Jump, and Monthly Comic Nora from July 19, 1964, to 1981. It was published in North America by Tokyopop. On October 12, 2012, comiXology announced that they acquired the digital distribution rights to Shotaro Ishinomori's catalogue, including Cyborg 009.

== Volume list ==
| No. | Original release date | Original ISBN | English release date | English ISBN |
|---|---|---|---|---|
| 1 | July 1966 | 978-4-253-06001-1 | September 9, 2003 | 978-1-59182-676-7 |
Prologue; 001. "Merchants of Death"; 002. "The Cyborg Laboratory"; 003. "The Men in Black"; 004. "Number 00, The Guinea Pigs"; 005. "Birth of 009"; 006. "Rebellion"; 007. "10,000 vs. 10 Warriors"; 008. "Escape by Sea (Part 1)"
| 2 | August 1966 | 978-4-253-06002-8 | November 11, 2003 | 978-1-59182-677-4 |
008. "Escape by Sea (Part 2)"; Cyborg 009 Part II: The Black Ghost; Prologue; 009. "Assassins"; 010. "Man-Eating Mansion"; 011. "0013"
| 3 | October 1966 | 978-4-253-06003-5 | January 13, 2004 | 978-1-59182-678-1 |
011. "0013"; Cyborg 009 Part III: The Journey; 012. "Man and Machine"; 013. "The Journey Begins"; 014. "The Man with the Expensive Castle"
| 4 | November 1966 | 978-4-253-06004-2 | March 2, 2004 | 978-1-59182-679-8 |
Cyborg 009 Part III: The Journey (Continued); 015. "Empty War"; 016. "A New Type of Bomb (Thunder and Lightning)"; 017. "Deep Sea Wanderer"; Cyborg 009 Part IV: A Vietnam Story; Prologue; 018. "Mud and Blood (Part 1)"
| 5 | February 1967 | 978-4-253-06005-9 | May 4, 2004 | 978-1-59182-680-4 |
Cyborg 009 Part IV: Vietnam Story; 018. "Mud and Blood (Part 2)"; 019. "Cyborgman"; 020. "The Mole and the Moon"; 021. "Before the Dawn"
| 6 | August 1968 | 978-4-253-06006-6 | July 6, 2004 | 978-1-59182-681-1 |
Cyborg 009 Part V: The Mythos Cyborgs; Prologue; 022. "The Gods of Mount Olympus"; 023. "The Ocean Tunnel"; 024. "Achilles' Heel"; 025. "Helena and Apollo"; 026. "Atlas Invasion (Part 1)"
| 7 | September 1968 | 978-4-253-06007-3 | September 7, 2004 | 978-1-59182-682-8 |
Cyborg 009 Part V: The Mythos Cyborgs Story; 026. "Atlas Invasion (Part Two)"; 027. "The Final Chapter"; Cyborg 009 Side Stories; "Cyborg Soldiers: The Golden Lion"; "Cyborg Soldiers: The Phantom Dog"
| 8 | April 1968 | 978-4-253-06008-0 | November 2, 2004 | 978-1-59182-683-5 |
Cyborg 009 Part VI: The Underground Empire of Hades Story; Prologue; 028. "Hurricane Joe"; 029. "Reunion"; 030. "The Gathering"; 031. "Defying Black Ghost"; 032. "Silence and Compromise"
| 9 | January 1968 | 978-4-253-06009-7 | January 11, 2005 | 978-1-59532-393-4 |
Cyborg 009 Part VI: The Underground Empire of Hades Story (continued); 032. "Mistrust and Compromise"; 033. "Commence Attack"; 034. "Into the Underground Lair"
| 10 | April 1970 | 978-4-253-06010-3 | March 8, 2005 | 978-1-59532-394-1 |
Cyborg 009 Part VI: The Underground Empire of Hades Story (continued); 035. "The Evil Underground Empire of Hades"; 036. "Decisive Battle"; 037. "From the Surface to Quick Freeze ... "; Afterword
