= Viktor Bout =

Russian arms dealer (born 1967)

- Виктор Бут
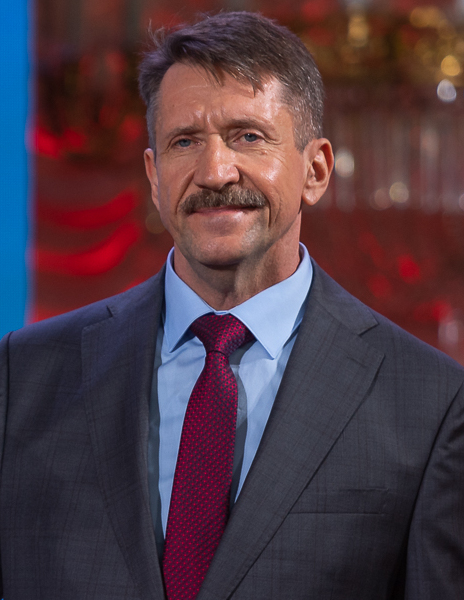
- Bout in 2022

Member of the Legislative Assembly of Ulyanovsk Oblast
- Incumbent
- Assumed office 20 September 2023

Personal details
- Born: Viktor Anatolyevich Bout; 13 January 1967 (age 59) Dushanbe, Tajik SSR, Soviet Union
- Party: Liberal Democratic Party of Russia (2022–present)
- Spouse: Alla Bout (m. 1992)
- Children: Yelizaveta Bout
- Occupation: Arms dealer
- Nickname(s): Merchant of Death; Vadim Markovich Aminov; Viktor Bulakin; Viktor Butt; Viktor Budd; Boris
- Criminal information
- Status: Repatriated to Russia as part of a prisoner exchange
- Criminal charges: Conspiring to kill, acquiring and export missiles, providing material to a terrorist organization

Viktor Anatolyevich Bout (Note: In this name that follows East Slavic naming customs, the patronymic is Anatolyevich and the family name is Bout.) (/buːt/; Russian: Ви́ктор Анато́льевич Бут, romanized: Viktor Anatolyevich But; born 13 January 1967) is a Russian arms dealer and politician. A weapons manufacturer and former Soviet military translator, he used his companies to smuggle arms from Eastern Europe to Africa and the Middle East during the 1990s and early 2000s. Bout gained the epithet the "Merchant of Death" after British minister Peter Hain read a report to the United Nations in 2003 on Bout's wide-reaching operations, extensive clientele, and willingness to bypass embargoes.

In a 2008 US sting operation, Bout was arrested in Thailand on terrorism charges by the Royal Thai Police in cooperation with American authorities and Interpol. The United States Ambassador to Thailand Eric G. John requested his extradition, which was mandated by the Supreme Court of Thailand in 2010. Bout was accused of intending to sell arms to a United States Drug Enforcement Administration (DEA) informer pretending to represent the Revolutionary Armed Forces of Colombia (FARC) for use against American forces in Colombia, but Bout denied the charges and predicted an acquittal.

In 2011, Bout was convicted by a jury at a federal court in Manhattan, of conspiracy to kill American citizens and officials, delivery of anti-aircraft missiles, and providing aid to a terrorist organization; he was sentenced to the minimum 25 years' imprisonment. From 2012 until 2022, Bout was held at the United States Penitentiary, Marion. In 2022, he was released in a prisoner exchange for American basketball player Brittney Griner, who had been sentenced, in August 2022, to nine years of imprisonment for bringing 0.7g of cannabis oil into Russia. Bout had served 10 years in prison before his release in December 2022.

After returning to Russia, Bout joined the Liberal Democratic Party of Russia in 2022 and won a seat in the Legislative Assembly of Ulyanovsk Oblast as a member of the LDPR on 2 July 2023.

== Early life ==
Bout's origins are unclear. United Nations documents and Bout himself both state his birthplace as Dushanbe, Tajik SSR, Soviet Union (now the capital of Tajikistan), and that his date of birth is most likely 13 January 1967, although several other dates are possible. He has an older brother named Sergei Bout.

Bout became a Russian citizen following the dissolution of the Soviet Union in 1991. According to the UN Security Council Committee on Liberia, Bout holds at least four passports. A number of sources referred to Bout as a Tajik national or Tajik-born.

== Military career ==
Bout served in the Soviet Armed Forces. There is no definite information on his military career except that he graduated from the Soviet Military Institute of Foreign Languages in the late 1980s. Bout's training allowed him to become a polyglot and master five foreign languages: Portuguese, English, French, Arabic, and Persian. He is reported to be fluent in Esperanto, which he learned at age 12 in the early 1980s as a member of the Dushanbe Esperanto club. Bout's personal website stated that he served in the Soviet Army as a translator, holding the rank of lieutenant.

It is unknown what rank Bout held while in military. In a radio interview with Radio Echo Moskvy, Bout himself said he retired with "an officer's rank." Other reports identified Bout as a former major. Bout is thought to have been discharged from the Soviet Army upon its dissolution in 1991 with the rank of lieutenant colonel, whereupon he started an air freight business. Other sources state he was a major in the GRU, an officer in the Soviet Air Forces, that he graduated from a Soviet military intelligence training program, or an operative of the KGB.

Bout was involved with a Soviet military operation in Angola in the late 1980s assisting the People's Movement for the Liberation of Angola (MPLA) in the Angolan Civil War. He has stated that he was in Angola only for a few weeks. During this time in Africa he went on to learn the Xhosa and Zulu languages. His time in Africa also included a two-year stint in Mozambique.

== Post-Soviet era ==
=== 1990s ===
It is believed that Bout as a former member of the Soviet military was perfectly positioned to purchase surplus Soviet-era military equipment, including three Antonov An-12 aircraft, in the years following the collapse of the Soviet Union. According to Bout's personal website, he founded an air freight business, Air Cess, in Liberia in 1995. Air Cess is the only company connected to Bout that has ever officially recognized him as the head. He operated four Antonov An-8 planes in Angola as it was the only country to allow the An-8 to be used in civilian freight at the time. Reportedly, Bout's companies legally provided air freight services to the French government, the United Nations, and the United States, including transporting flowers, frozen chicken, UN peacekeepers, French soldiers, and African heads of state.

Bout acknowledges traveling to Afghanistan on numerous occasions during the 1990s, but has denied dealing with al-Qaeda or the Taliban. Beginning in 1994, Bout made shipments for the pre-Taliban government of Afghanistan, which later became the Northern Alliance, and knew one of its commanders, Ahmad Shah Massoud. The Central Intelligence Agency described Bout-owned planes as transporters of small arms and ammunition into Afghanistan. In 1995, Bout was involved in negotiations to free Russian hostages during the 1995 Airstan incident.

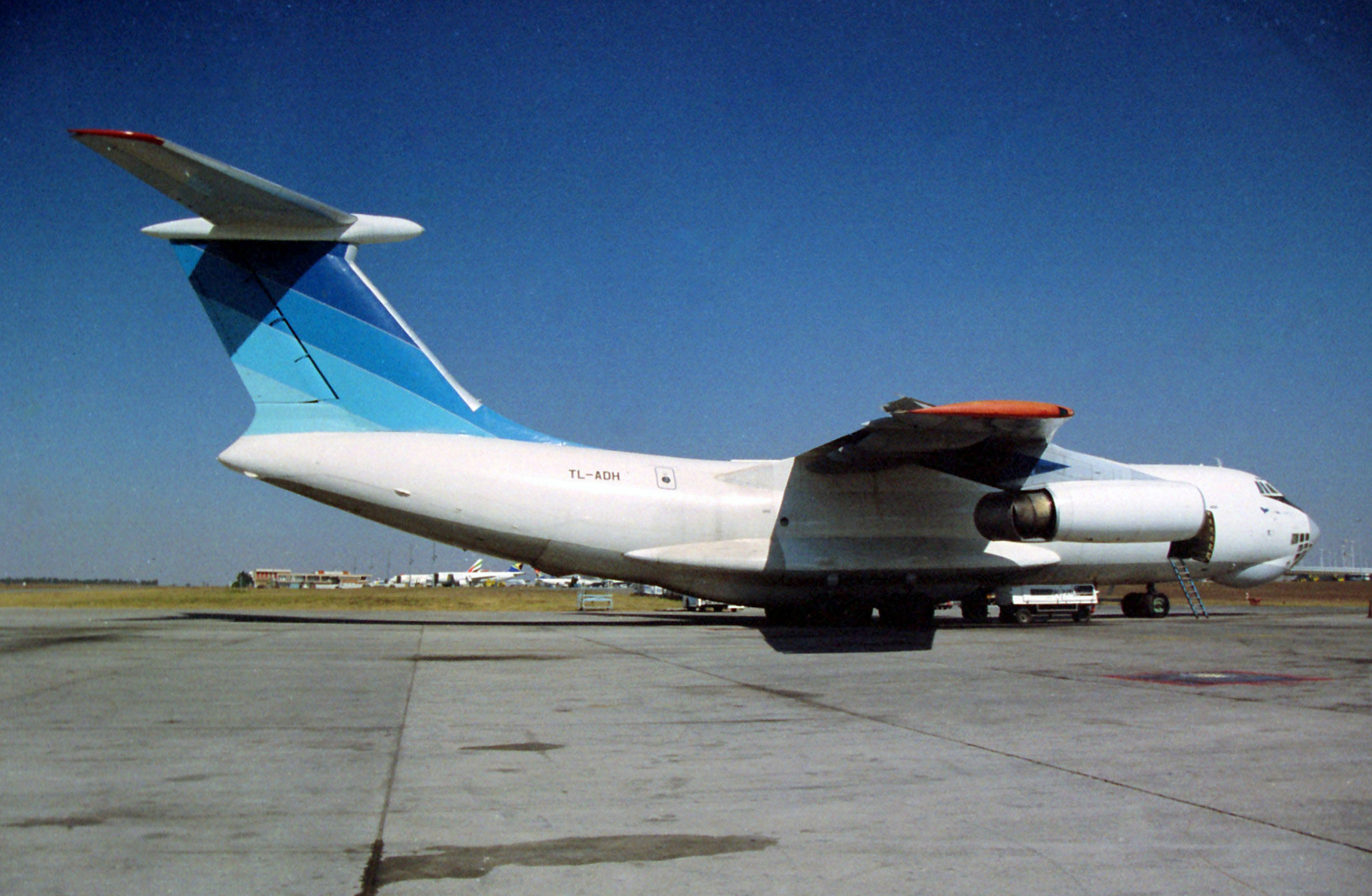
An Il-76 formerly used by Bout's Centrafrican Airlines

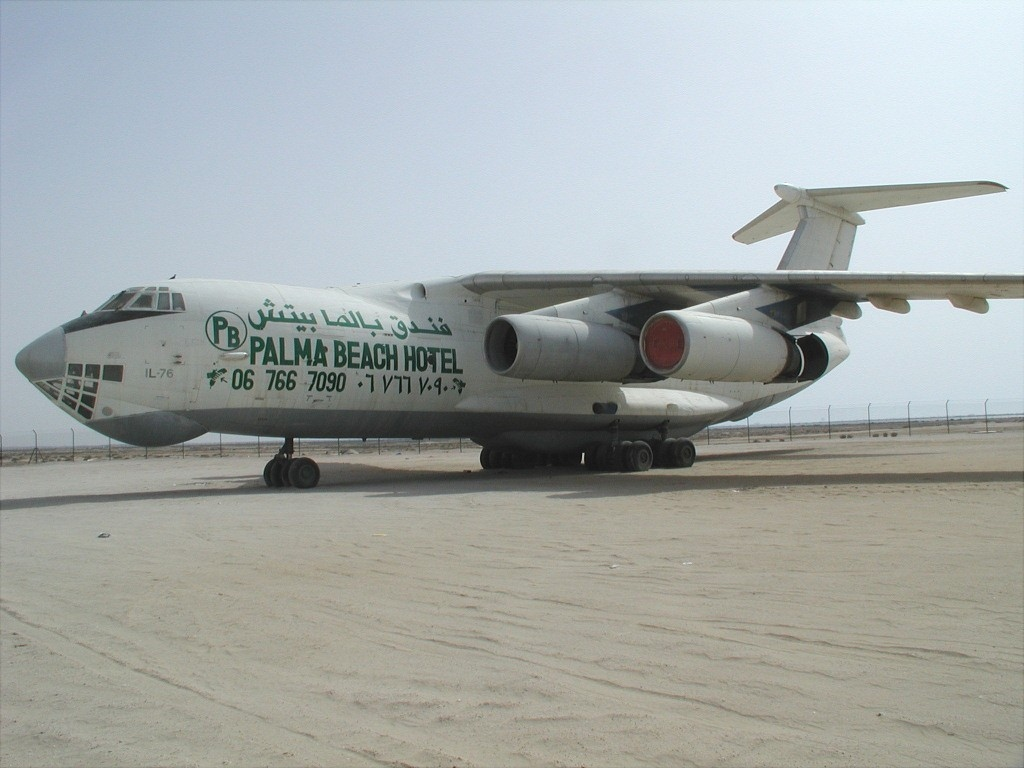
An Il-76 formerly used by Air Cess and Air Pass, a joint venture between Bout and a South African company

In 2000, a United Nations report stated, "Bulgarian arms manufacturing companies had exported large quantities of different types of weapons between 1996 and 1998 on the basis of (forged) end-user certificates from Togo", and that "with only one exception, the company Air Cess, owned by Victor Bout, was the main transporter of these weapons from Burgas airport in Bulgaria". This was the first time Bout was formally mentioned in connection with arms trafficking. The weapons may have been destined for use in the Angolan Civil War by UNITA, the opposing faction of the MPLA which Bout had aided during his military service.

Another suspected arms dealer, Imad Kebir, is said to have employed Bout's aircraft during the mid-1990s to transport weapons to Africa from Eastern European states. The cargo supposedly had end-user certificates from Zaire, but the true end-user was UNITA in neighboring Angola. From 1993, UNITA was covered under Resolution 864, a United Nations Security Council embargo prohibiting the importation of arms to Angola.

In Liberia, Bout was suspected of supplying Charles Taylor with arms for use in the First Liberian Civil War, with eyewitnesses claiming that the two met personally.

In 1993, Bout began collaborating with Richard Chichakli. In 1995 the Sharjah International Airport in the United Arab Emirates hired Chichakli to be the commercial manager of its new free-trade zone. Bout began using the UAE's free trade zone, and Chichakli was, at one time, called Bout's "financial manager" by the United States.

Supposedly, Bout had been involved with arms dealings during the Yugoslav Wars, especially with the Bosnian government forces during its uprising against the Milošević government in Yugoslavia. Hasan Čengić, who was the former Deputy Prime Minister and Defense Minister of the Federation of Bosnia and Herzegovina is allegedly one of his former contacts. They came into contact with each other as they both stayed in Tehran during the 1980s and 1990s. The Slobodna Bosna newspaper claims that Čengić was a business partner of Bout since then, when 200,000 AK-47 rifles went missing in transit from Bosnia to Iraq in May 2006. One of Bout's airlines was the carrier.

=== 2000s ===
After the 2001 United States invasion of Afghanistan, Bout appeared in Moscow and stated that his aircraft made regular flights to Afghanistan, but continued to deny any contact with al-Qaeda or the Taliban—instead supplying the rebel Northern Alliance. Soon after the beginning of the War in Afghanistan, al-Qaeda is said to have moved gold and cash out of Afghanistan. In July 2003, The New York Times interviewed Bout, who stated that "I woke up after Sept. 11 and found I was second only to Osama."

In 2004, Bout and Chichakli allegedly set up Samar Airlines in Tajikistan to conduct money laundering activities and protect assets from authorities, according to an indictment by the U.S. Justice Department in 2010. Bout is suspected of supplying weapons to numerous armed groups in Africa in the 2000s, particularly in the Democratic Republic of the Congo during the Second Congo War. He may have employed some 300 people and operated 40 to 60 aircraft.

Bout's network allegedly delivered surface-to-air missiles to Kenya to be used to attack an Israeli airliner during takeoff in 2002.

Bout was reportedly seen meeting with Hezbollah officials in Lebanon during the run-up to the 2006 Lebanon War, while some sources claim he was actually in Russia when the meeting took place.

Records found in Libyan leader Muammar Gaddafi's former intelligence headquarters in Tripoli, shortly after the overthrow of the Gaddafi government in 2011, indicated that in late September 2003, British intelligence officials told then-Libyan intelligence chief Musa Kusa that Bout had a "considerable commercial presence in Libya" and aimed to expand his interests there.

In 2007, the Los Angeles Times reported that the U.S. government and its contractors paid Bout-controlled firms roughly $60 million to fly supplies into Iraq in support of American forces, describing Bout as a "linchpin" for American supply lines in Iraq.

== Investigation ==
Bout's strategy of constantly moving locations, owning numerous companies, and frequently re-registering aircraft made it hard for authorities to make a case against him. He has never been charged for the alleged African arms deals to which he owes his notoriety. During Bout's reported operations, he is believed to have lived in various countries, including Belgium, Lebanon, Rwanda, Russia, South Africa, Syria, and the United Arab Emirates. In 2000, Bout was charged in the Central African Republic with forging documents and was convicted in absentia, but the charges were later dropped.

Belgian authorities requested that Interpol issue a notice for Bout on charges of money laundering. In 2002 an Interpol red notice on Bout was issued. Bout's website states that because he failed to appear in court a Belgian warrant (not the Interpol notice) for his arrest was issued but later cancelled. The site has a document in Dutch to support the claim that the Belgian case against him was dismissed due to his lack of a fixed residence, and because the case could not be prosecuted in a timely fashion.

Bout's U.S. assets were among those frozen in July 2004 under Executive Order 13348, which describes him as a "businessman, dealer and transporter of weapons and minerals" and cites his close association with Charles Taylor.

=== US sting operation, arrest, and extradition ===
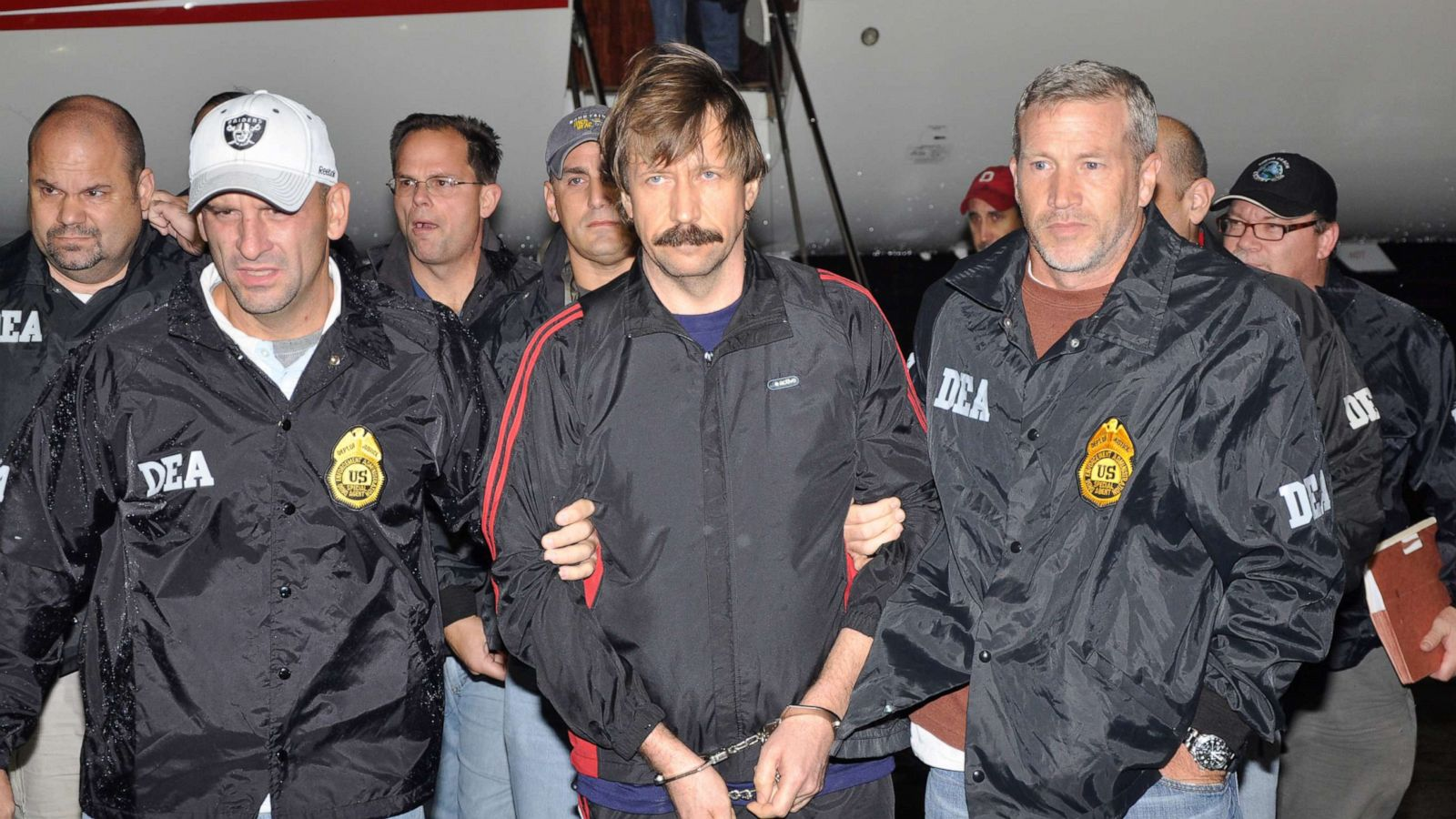
Bout in DEA custody (16 November 2010)

At the beginning of 2008, a US DEA paid informer, claiming to represent the Colombian rebel group FARC, supposedly independently of the CIA, negotiated with Bout for the supply of 100 9K38 Igla surface-to-air missiles and armour-piercing rocket launchers to be parachuted in by Bout to agreed landing spots in Colombia. The imposters invited Bout to Thailand to meet their leader. (Note: Bout planned to receive arms from KAS Engineering Consortium Ltd. (KAS), a Gibraltar firm with offices in Sofia, Bulgaria, that is owned by Peter Mirchev (Bulgarian: Петър Мирчев), who is a Russian and is only a few years older than Bout, and Ruso Ruso (Bulgarian: Русо Русо) who both had been close to Bout since early 1995.) He was charged with terrorism offences that included conspiracy to acquire and use an anti-aircraft missile, conspiracy to provide material support or resources to a designated foreign terrorist organisation, conspiracy to kill US nationals, and conspiracy to kill United States officers or employees. The US military was attacking the Colombian rebel group as part of Plan Colombia. None of the alleged crimes were committed in the US.

On 6 March 2008, Bout was arrested in Bangkok, Thailand, by the Royal Thai Police based on an Interpol red notice requested by the United States based on conspiracy to provide material support or resources to a designated foreign terrorist organization. After months of delay, the Criminal Court in Bangkok began an extradition hearing for Bout on 22 September 2008. In February 2009, members of the United States Congress signed a letter to Attorney General Eric Holder and Secretary of State Hillary Clinton expressing their wish that the Bout extradition "remain a top priority".

On 11 August 2009, the Bangkok Criminal Court ruled in his favor, denying the United States' request for extradition and citing the political, not criminal, nature of the case. The United States appealed that ruling. On 20 August 2010, a higher court in Thailand ruled that Bout could be extradited to the United States.

On 16 November 2010, Bout was extradited from Thailand to the United States amid protests by the Russian government, who deemed it illegal.

=== Russian protests ===
Russia called the Thai court decision in 2010 politically motivated. Russia's Foreign Ministry tried to prevent Bout being extradited to the U.S. Russia's foreign minister Sergei Lavrov suggested that Bout was innocent.

On 18 November 2010, shortly after Bout's extradition to the United States, former Russian President Dmitry Medvedev's aide Sergei Prikhodko said that Russia had "nothing to hide" in Bout's criminal case stating, "it is in our interest that the investigation ... be brought to completion, and [Bout] should answer all the questions the American justice system has."

On 18 January 2013, Russian officials announced that the officials who were involved in legal prosecution of Russian citizens Viktor Bout and Konstantin Yaroshenko would be added to a list of U.S. officials who will be denied Russian entry visas in response to the U.S. Magnitsky Act, under which certain Russian officials are ineligible to enter the U.S.

It is thought that Bout was of help to Russia's intelligence agencies, and he is alleged to have connections to ranking Russian officials, including former deputy prime minister Igor Sechin. The language institute Bout attended has been linked to the GRU. Bout allegedly served alongside the GRU-affiliated Sechin in Mozambique in the 1980s, although both men deny this allegation. According to a 2002 United Nations report, Bout's father-in-law Zuiguin "at one point held a high position in the KGB, perhaps even as high as a deputy chairman".

== U.S. prosecution and conviction ==
They will try to lock me up for life. But I'll get back to Russia. I don't know when. But I'm still young. Your empire will collapse and I'll get out of here.

— Bout in a 2012 interview with The New Yorker

The day after his Bangkok arrest, the U.S. Department of Justice charged Bout with conspiracy to provide material support or resources to a designated foreign terrorist organization, conspiring to kill Americans, conspiring to kill American officers or employees, and conspiring to acquire and use an anti-aircraft missile. Additional charges against him were filed in February 2010. These included illegal purchase of aircraft, wire fraud, and money laundering.

Bout was convicted by a jury at a federal court in Manhattan on 2 November 2011. On 5 April 2012, Bout was sentenced to 25 years in prison, the minimum sentence for conspiring to sell weapons to a U.S.-designated foreign terrorist group. US District Court Judge Shira Scheindlin ruled that the minimum sentence was appropriate because "there was no evidence that Bout would have committed the crimes for which he was convicted had it not been for the sting operation".

Russia's Ministry of Foreign Affairs issued a statement denouncing Bout's sentence as "a political order". During the trial, Bout's lawyers implied that he was a political prisoner. Bout's wife Alla said shortly afterwards that the judge conducted the trial in a proper way. Bout claimed that if the same standards were applied to everyone, all American gun shop owners "who are sending arms and ending up killing Americans" would be in prison.

In June 2013, a co-conspirator of Bout's, U.S-Syrian citizen Richard Ammar Chichakli, was extradited to New York on charges that he conspired to buy aircraft in violation of economic sanctions.

In September 2013, the 2nd U.S. Circuit Court of Appeals in New York upheld Bout's conviction, after rejecting his contention that he had been the victim of a vindictive prosecution and that there was no legitimate law enforcement reason to prosecute him.

In 2014, former U.S. Attorney General John Ashcroft's law firm represented Bout, seeking a new trial to overturn his conviction. As of 2022, Bout had been scheduled for release in August 2029.

It was revealed in June 2024 that Bout's legal fees had been paid by Pravfond, a Kremlin linked fund.

== Prisoner exchange ==
In June 2020, a Reuters article highlighted that following the charging of U.S. Marine Corps veteran Paul Whelan, Moscow was exploring the possibility of a prisoner swap exchanging Whelan for Bout and a pilot named Konstantin Yaroshenko. Yaroshenko was released in exchange for U.S. Marine Corps veteran Trevor Reed in April 2022.

In May 2022, a Forbes article claimed the Biden administration had offered Bout in exchange for the release of Women's National Basketball Association player Brittney Griner. Griner had been detained by customs officers in Sheremetyevo International Airport for being in possession of drugs illegal in Russia, for which she faced 5–10 years in prison. In July 2022, the proposal got further support from President Joe Biden. On 27 July, U.S. Secretary of State Antony Blinken said that the United States had made a "substantial offer" to Russia to release Griner and Paul Whelan, another American who had been convicted of spy activities in Russia, but declined to say what the United States was offering. On the same day, CNN reported that the U.S. had offered to exchange Bout for both Griner and Whelan.

Bout was released back to Russia on 8 December 2022. Once confirmation came on that the prisoner exchange excluded Whelan, CNN interviewed him. Whelan expressed his frustration that more has not been done to secure his release in the exclusive CNN interview.

Whelan continued and said he was happy that Griner was released, but told CNN, "I am greatly disappointed that more has not been done to secure my release, especially as the four year anniversary of my arrest is coming up." Biden said, "While we have not yet succeeded in securing Paul's release, we have not given up; we will not give up." Whelan would later be released as a part of a 26-person prisoner exchange on August 1, 2024.

== After returning to Russia ==
On 9 December 2022, Bout gave an interview to Maria Butina for RT, where he stated that he did not think he was important for Russian politics. On 10 December, Bout supported the Russian invasion of Ukraine and said that he would volunteer if given the opportunity and skills.

On 12 December 2022, Liberal Democratic Party of Russia (LDPR) leader Leonid Slutsky announced that Bout had joined the LDPR. On 2 July 2023, Bout was nominated to run for a seat in the Legislative Assembly of Ulyanovsk Oblast as a member of the LDPR, which he ended up winning.

On 6 October 2024, The Wall Street Journal reported that Bout had returned to dealing arms and was in discussions with Houthi militants regarding the sale of small arms for the Houthis' attacks on shipping in the Red Sea.

== Personal life ==
Since 1992, he has been married to Alla Vladimirovna Bout (née Protasova; born in 1970 in Leningrad). Alla is an artist, designer, fashion designer, was the owner of clothing stores in the UAE, Germany, South Africa and Russia. Viktor Bout met his future wife in the late 1980s in Mozambique, where he worked as a translator from Portuguese in the Soviet military mission. This was Alla's second marriage. His daughter was born in 1994 in the UAE.

Viktor Bout is a vegetarian. He claims that he is not a follower of any religion, but considers Leo Tolstoy and Ivan Ilyin to be his spiritual leaders and "shares the views" of Jesus Christ, Buddha, Zarathustra and Krishna.

Bout speaks Portuguese, Persian, Zulu, Xhosa, and English.

== In popular culture ==
=== Cinema ===
In 2005, Viktor Bout became the prototype for the main character of the Andrew Niccol film Lord of War, portrayed by Nicolas Cage.

According to Bout’s wife, Viktor also served as the prototype for the coordinator and sponsor of the escape of Russian pilots – from Taliban captivity in the film Kandahar.

A documentary about Bout, The Notorious Mr. Bout, from Market Road Films and directed by Tony Gerber and Maxim Pozdorovkin, received its premiere at the 2014 Sundance Film Festival.

=== Literature ===
In 2007, Stephen Braun and Douglas Farah published a book about Bout titled Merchant of Death: Money, Guns, Planes, and the Man Who Makes War Possible.

Bout also served as the prototype for the arms dealer and supplier Andrey Shut in the novel Equator by Andrey Tsaplienko.

In 2010, French writer Gérard de Villiers wrote the novel The Bangkok Trap, in which Viktor Bout was the inspiration for the main character.

In the same year, Russian poet Yunna Morits published poems dedicated to Viktor Bout.

In 2021, journalist Alexander Gasyuk published the book Viktor Bout: The True Story of the "Merchant of Death".

== See also ==
- Sarkis Soghanalian

== Bibliography ==
- Estulin, Daniel, Shadow Masters, Oregon: Trine Day, 2010. ISBN 978-0-9799886-1-5. (The author spent six months attending court hearings and interviewing Bout in prison.)
- Scott-Clark, Cathy (2025). Russia's Man of War: the extraordinary Viktor Bout. London: Hurst. ISBN 9781911723943.
