= List of aircraft (Su) =

This is a list of aircraft in alphabetical order beginning with 'Su'.

== Su ==
=== Sud Aviation ===
- Sud Aviation SE-116 Voltigeur
- Sud Aviation SE-117 Voltigeur
- Sud Aviation SE-118 Diplomate
- Sud Aviation SE-210 Caravelle
- Sud Aviation SE-214 Caravelle
- Sud Aviation Alouette II
- Sud Aviation Alouette III
- Sud Aviation Djinn
- Sud Aviation Fennec
- Sud Aviation Puma
- Sud Aviation SA-3164
- Sud Aviation SA-3180
- Sud Aviation SA-340
- Sud Aviation SA-370
- Sud Aviation X-370
- Sud Aviation X-375
- Sud Aviation Super Caravelle
- Sud Aviation Super Frelon
- Sud Aviation Vautour
- Sud Aviation Lama

=== Sud Aviation/BAC ===
- Concorde

=== Sukhanov ===
- Sukhanov Discoplan

=== Sukhoi ===
- Sukhoi Su-1/I-330 high-altitude fighter
- Sukhoi Su-2 reconnaissance/light bomber
- Sukhoi Su-3/I-360 improved Su-1
- Sukhoi Su-4 upgraded Su-2
- Sukhoi Su-5/I-107 prototype motorjet fighter
- Sukhoi Su-6 ground-attack aircraft
- Sukhoi Su-7 (1944) prototype mixed-power, high-altitude interceptor based on the Su-6
- Sukhoi Su-7 swept-wing, supersonic fighter
- Sukhoi Su-8/DDBSh prototype two-seat ground-attack aircraft
- Sukhoi Su-9 prototype straight-wing jet fighter; also known as Aircraft 'K'
- Sukhoi Su-9 single-engine, all-weather, missile-armed interceptor
- Sukhoi Su-10 prototype four-engine jet bomber; also known as Product 'Ye'
- Sukhoi Su-11 re-engined Su-9 with revised wings; also known as Aircraft 'KL'
- Sukhoi Su-11 interceptor; upgraded Su-9
- Sukhoi Su-12 prototype observation aircraft based on the Fw 189; also known as Aircraft 'RK'
- Sukhoi Su-13 re-engined Su-11; also known as Aircraft 'KT'
- Sukhoi Su-15 prototype all-weather interceptor; also known as Aircraft 'P'
- Sukhoi Su-15 twinjet supersonic interceptor
- Sukhoi Su-17 prototype fighter; also known as Aircraft 'R'
- Sukhoi Su-17 variable-sweep wing fighter developed from the Su-7
- Sukhoi Su-20 initial export version of the Su-17M
- Sukhoi Su-22
- Sukhoi Su-24 supersonic, all-weather, variable-sweep wing tactical bomber
- Sukhoi Su-25 subsonic attack/close air support aircraft
- Sukhoi Su-26 single-seat acrobatic aircraft
- Sukhoi Su-27 multirole/air superiority fighter
  - Sukhoi Su-30 multirole fighter
  - Sukhoi Su-32 export version of Su-34 for Algeria
  - Sukhoi Su-33 carrier-based air superiority fighter derived from the Su-27
  - Sukhoi Su-34 fighter-bomber/strike fighter based on the Su-27
  - Sukhoi Su-35 multirole fighter developed from the Su-27
    - Sukhoi Su-35BM
  - Sukhoi Su-37 improved Su-35
- Sukhoi Su-28 downgraded trainer variant of the Su-25UB/Su-25T
- Sukhoi Su-29 two-seat acrobatic aircraft
- Sukhoi Su-31 single-seat acrobatic aircraft
- Sukhoi Su-38 light agricultural aircraft
- Sukhoi Su-39 ground-attack aircraft, optimized for anti-tank use
- Sukhoi Su-47 Berkut, experimental subsonic technology demonstrator
- Sukhoi Su-57 stealth fighter
- Sukhoi Su-80 STOL transport aircraft
- Sukhoi KR-860 double-deck, widebody superjumbo jetliner project
- Sukhoi P-1 prototype interceptor
- Sukhoi-Gulfstream S-21 supersonic business jet project
- Sukhoi S-32
- Sukhoi S-37
- Sukhoi S-54 proposed trainer
- Sukhoi ShB prototype ground-attack version of Su-2; not produced due to availability of the Il-2
- Sukhoi T-3 prototype fighter
- Sukhoi T-4 high-speed reconnaissance/anti-ship/strategic bomber
- Sukhoi T-6
- Sukhoi T-10

=== Sullivan Aircraft Mfg CoSullivan ===
((William P) Sullivan Aircraft Mfg Co, 630 E Gilbert St, Wichita, KS)

- Sullivan K-3 Crested Harpy

=== Sullivan Aircraft CoSullivan ===
((W P) Sullivan Aircraft Co, 1693 Mission St, San Francisco, CA)

- Sullivan Goblin

=== Summit ===
(Summit Aeronautical Corp (pres: M V D Towt), Westfield, MA c.1940: Bendix, NJ)

- Summit HM-5

=== Summit Aerosports ===
(Yale, MI)

- Summit 2
- Summit SS
- Summit Steel Breeze
- Summit 103 Mini Breeze

=== Sun ===
(Sun Aerospace Group, Nappanee, IN)

- Sun Ray 100

=== Sunair UG ===
(Scheidegg, Bavaria, Germany)

- Sunair Magic
- Sunair Sunlight

=== Sun Lake ===
(LanShe Aerospace a.k.a. Sun Lake Aircraft (pres: Wadi Rahim), Ft Pierce, FL)

- Sun Lake Buccaneer 2

=== Sunbeam ===
- Sunbeam 1917 Bomber

=== Sundog Powerchutes Inc ===
(Pierceland, Saskatchewan, Canada)

- Sundog One-Seater
- Sundog Two-Seater

=== Sundorph ===
((Eiler C) Sundorph Aeronautical Corp, Cleveland, OH)

- Sundorph A-1 Special

=== Sundstedt-Hannevig ===
(Hugo Sundstedt & Christoffer Hannevig)

- Sundstedt-Hannevig Sunrise – built by Wittemann-Lewis Aircraft Co

=== Sun Flightcraft ===
(Hofbauer GmbH, Innsbruck, Austria)

- Sun Flightcraft Air-Chopper

=== Sunward Aircraft ===
(Sunward – Hunan Science and Technologies Co Ltd, Zhuzhou, Hunan, China)

- Sunward Aurora
- Sunward ST
- Sunward STB
- Sunward UAV

=== Super 18 ===
- Super 18 Model S18-180

=== Super Rotor ===
(M.M. Super Rotor Brasileira Ltda)

- Super Rotor AC.1
- Super Rotor AC.4 Andorhina
- Super Rotor Agricóptero
- Super Rotor M.1 Montalva
- Super Rotor M.2 Trovão Azul ("Blue Thunder")

=== Super-Marine ===
(Super-Marine Systems Inc, Graybar Bldg, NY)

- Super-Marine 1930 Biplane

=== Superior ===
(Superior Aircraft Co, Dearborn, MI)

- Superior 1926 Biplane

=== Superior ===
(Superior Aircraft Corp div of Priestly-Hunt Corp, Culver City, CA)

- Superior LCA
- Superior LFA
- Superior Satellite
- Superior V
- Superior V2

=== Supermarine ===
- Supermarine Air Yacht
- Supermarine Attacker
- Supermarine Baby
- Supermarine Channel
- Supermarine Commercial Amphibian
- Supermarine Nanok
- Supermarine Nighthawk
- Supermarine Scapa
- Supermarine Scarab
- Supermarine Scylla
- Supermarine Scimitar
- Supermarine Sea Eagle
- Supermarine Sea King
- Supermarine Sea Lion I
- Supermarine Sea Lion II
- Supermarine Sea Lion III – re-engined Sea Lion II
- Supermarine Sea Otter
- Supermarine Sea Urchin
- Supermarine Seafang
- Supermarine Seafire
- Supermarine Seagull (1921)
- Supermarine Seagull V – prototype Supermarine Walrus
- Supermarine Seagull ASR-1
- Supermarine Seal
- Supermarine Seamew
- Supermarine Sheldrake
- Supermarine Solent
- Supermarine Southampton
- Supermarine Sparrow
- Supermarine Spiteful
- Supermarine Spitfire
- Supermarine Stranraer
- Supermarine Swan
- Supermarine Swift
- Supermarine Walrus
- Supermarine S.4
- Supermarine S.5
- Supermarine S.6
- Supermarine S.6A
- Supermarine S.6B
- Supermarine Type 179
- Supermarine Type 221
- Supermarine Type 224
- Supermarine Type 227
- Supermarine Type 228
- Supermarine Type 235 – Southampton IV/Jumo for R28/33
- Supermarine Type 236
- Supermarine Type 300
- Supermarine Type 304
- Supermarine Type 309
- Supermarine Type 311
- Supermarine Type 316 – (Spec. B12/36)
- Supermarine Type 317 – (Spec. B12/36)
- Supermarine Type 318 – (Spec. B12/36)
- Supermarine Type 322 – (S.24/37 Dumbo)
- Supermarine Type 323
- Supermarine Type 326 Walrus Development
- Supermarine Type 329
- Supermarine Type 330
- Supermarine Type 331
- Supermarine Type 332
- Supermarine Type 335
- Supermarine Type 336
- Supermarine Type 337
- Supermarine Type 338
- Supermarine Type 341
- Supermarine Type 342
- Supermarine Type 343
- Supermarine Type 344
- Supermarine Type 345
- Supermarine Type 346
- Supermarine Type 348
- Supermarine Type 353
- Supermarine Type 349
- Supermarine Type 350
- Supermarine Type 351
- Supermarine Type 355
- Supermarine Type 356
- Supermarine Type 359
- Supermarine Type 360
- Supermarine Type 361
- Supermarine Type 362
- Supermarine Type 365
- Supermarine Type 366
- Supermarine Type 367
- Supermarine Type 369
- Supermarine Type 371
- Supermarine Type 372
- Supermarine Type 373
- Supermarine Type 374
- Supermarine Type 376
- Supermarine Type 378
- Supermarine Type 379
- Supermarine Type 380 – (Spec. S.24/37)
- Supermarine Type 381
- Supermarine Type 382
- Supermarine Type 385
- Supermarine Type 389
- Supermarine Type 390
- Supermarine Type 392 – prototype Attacker
- Supermarine Type 394
- Supermarine Type 395
- Supermarine Type 396
- Supermarine Type 398 – prototype navalised Attacker
- Supermarine Type 500 – Proposal variant of type 392 (1946)
- Supermarine Type 501 Spitfire Experimental
- Supermarine Type 503 Sea Otter
- Supermarine Type 504 S.14/44 ASR
- Supermarine Type 505
- Supermarine Type 508
- Supermarine Type 510
- Supermarine Type 513 – 2nd prototype navalised Attacker
- Supermarine Type 517
- Supermarine Type 520 – Projected conversion of second type 510 (1948–49)
- Supermarine Type 525
- Supermarine Type 527 – Proposed Attacker variant with Avon or Tay engine (1949)
- Supermarine Type 528
- Supermarine Type 529
- Supermarine Type 537 – Strike conversion of type 525 (1950) for NR/A.19
- Supermarine Type 541
- Supermarine Type 543
- Supermarine Type 544
- Supermarine 545
- Supermarine Type 554 OR 318 advanced jet trainer of Type 545
- Supermarine Type 558 – Scimitar Mk.2 proposal (1955)
- Vickers-Supermarine Type 559 – supersonic high altitude interceptor design for F.155T

=== Surrey Flying Services ===
- Surrey Flying Services AL.1

=== Sutro ===
(Adolph G Sutro, San Francisco, CA)

- Sutro 1913 hydro-aeroplane

=== Suzuki ===
(Shigeru Suzuki)

- Suzuki Gyro No.2 Tractor
