= List of Sukhoi aircraft =

This is a list of aircraft produced by Sukhoi, a Russian aircraft manufacturer.

== Products ==
=== Production Aircraft ===
==== Military aircraft ====
Name	NATO Designation Name	Type	Description	Number Built	Maiden Flight	Introduction	Years of Production	Retired
Su-1	None	advanced single seat high altitude fighter			Late 1940			
Su-2	None	reconnaissance aircraft, light bomber		910	August 25, 1937	1939, December	1937–1942	1944
Su-7	Fitter A	ground-attack aircraft		1,847	September 7, 1955	1959	1957–1972	-
Su-9	Fishpot B	interceptor fighter aircraft		1,150	June 24, 1959	1959	1959–1960s	1979
Su-11	Fishpot C	interceptor fighter aircraft		108	December 25, 1958	1964	1962–1965	1983
Su-15	Flagon	interceptor fighter aircraft		1,290	May 30, 1962	1965	1965–1979	1996
Su-17/Su-20/Su-22	Fitter D	variable-wing ground-attack aircraft		2,867	August 2, 1966	1970	1969–1990	-
Su-24	Fencer	deep strike bomber, variable-wing interdictor aircraft		1,400~	July 2, 1967	1974	1967–1993	-
Su-25	Frogfoot	close air support	twinjet, single-seat	1,000+	February 22, 1975	1981, July 19	1978–present	-
Su-27	Flanker	multirole fighter, air superiority fighter	twinjet, single-seat	809	May 20, 1977	1985, June 22	1982–present	-
Su-33	Flanker D	carrier-based multirole fighter, air superiority fighter	twinjet, single-seat	35~	August 17, 1987	1998, August 31	1987–1999	-
Su-30	Flanker C	multirole fighter	twinjet, twin-seat	540+	December 31, 1989	1996	1992–present	-
Su-27M/Su-35	Flanker E	multirole fighter, air superiority fighter	twinjet, single-seat	Su-27M: 15; Su-35S: 128	Su-27M: June 28, 1988; Su-35S: February 19, 2008	2014	Su-27M: 1988–1995; Su-35S: 2007–present	-
Su-30MK-2/MKK	Flanker G	MK-2: multi-role fighter aircraft MKK: strike-fighter aircraft Chinese variant of Su-30		134	Su-30МK: 1 July 1997	2000, December	2000–present	-
Su-30MKI	Flanker H	air superiority fighter Indian Air Force variant of Su-30		230 (February 2017)	Su-30МK: 1 July 1997; Su-30MKI: 2000	2002, September 27	Su-30MKI: 2000–present	-
Su-80	None	STOL transport aircraft	twin-turboprop, twin-boom	8	February 4, 2001	2001	2001–present	-
Su-34/Su-32	Fullback	fighter-bomber, strike fighter	twinjet, twin-seat	138	April 13, 1990	2014, March 20	2006–present	-
Su-30MKM	Flanker I	multirole air superiority fighter Malaysian Air Force variant of Su-30		18	Su-30МK: 1 July 1997	2007	2007–present	-
Su-57/T-50	Felon	multirole fifth-generation jet fighter	twin-engine, single-seat	12	29 January 2010	2020, December	2009–present (prototypes only until 2018)	-
Su-47	Firkin	Experimental aircraft, Jet fighter	Twin-engine, single-seat	1	-			
Su-75 Checkmate		multirole fifth-generation jet fighter	single-engine, single-seat	1	December of 2023	2026-2027	2021–present (prototypes only 2021)	

==== Civilian aircraft ====
Name	Type	Description	Seats	Number Built	Maiden Flight	Introduction	Years of Production
Su-26	aerobatic aircraft	single-seat	1	153 if combined	June 1984	1984	1984–present
Su-29	aerobatic aircraft	double-seat	2	153 if combined	1991	1991	1991–present
Su-31	aerobatic aircraft	single-seat	1	153 if combined	1992	1992	1992–present
Su-80	STOL transport aircraft	twin-turboprop, twin-boom	30	8	February 4, 2001	2001	2001–present
Superjet 100	regional jet airliner	narrow-body, twinjet	87	136	May 19, 2008	April 21, 2011 with Armavia	2007–present

=== Experimental aircraft ===
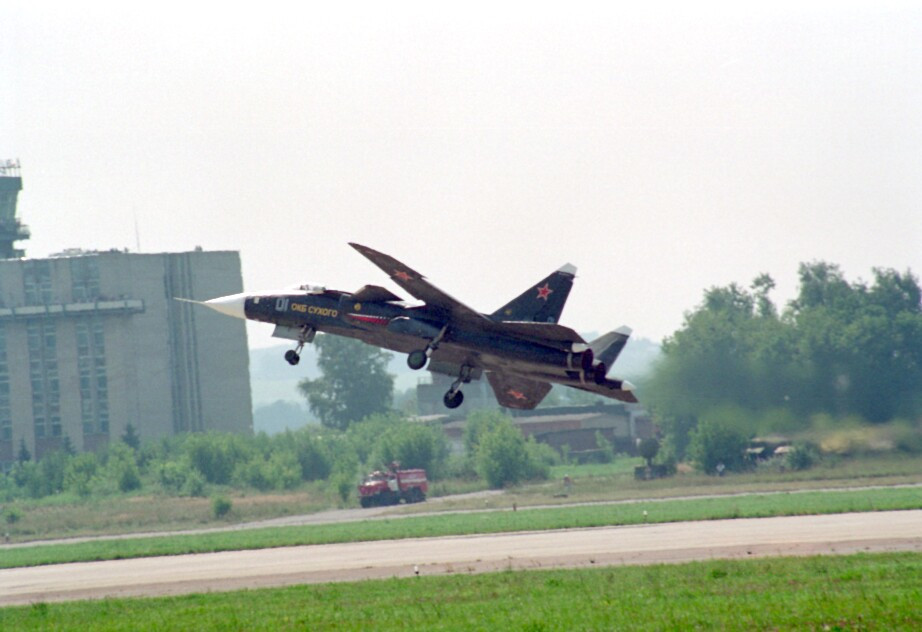
Su-47 (S-37)

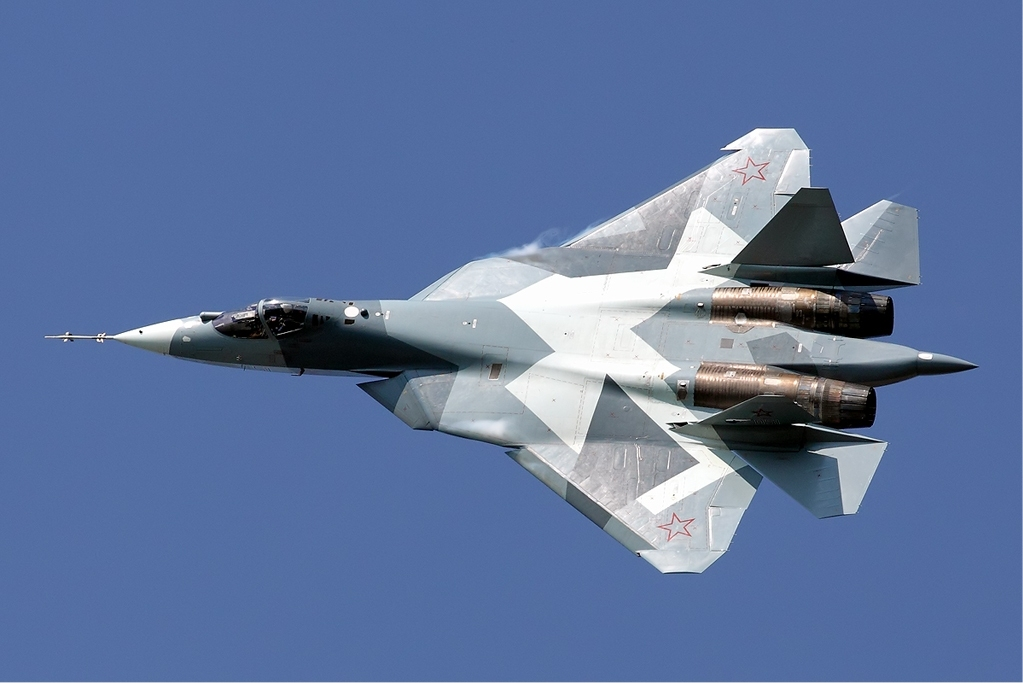
Su-57

- Su-1/I-330: high-altitude fighter, 1940
- Su-3/I-360: improved Su-1, 1942
- Su-4/BB-3: prototype version of Su-2 re-engined with a M-90 engine, 1941
- Su-5/I-107: prototype motorjet fighter, 1945
- Su-6: ground attack aircraft, 1942
- Su-7: prototype mixed-power high-altitude interceptor, 1944
- Su-8/DDBSh: ground attack aircraft, 1943
- Su-9: jet fighter, 1946
- Su-10: four-engine jet bomber, 1946
- Su-11: prototype twin-engine fighter developed from the Su-9, resembled the Me 262, 1946
- Su-12: observation plane, 1947
- Su-13: prototype twin-engine jet fighter developed from the Su-11, 1947
- Su-15: fighter-interceptor, 1949
- Su-17: fighter, 1949
- Sukhoi-Gulfstream S-21: a supersonic business jet design.
- Sukhoi KR-860: doubledeck superjumbo jet design.
- Su-37 ("Terminator"): an improved Su-35
- Su-28 / Su-25UB: trainer and demonstrator
- Su-25TM / Su-39: 1984, ground attack aircraft, optimised for anti-tank use
- Su-38: light agricultural aircraft
- S-32/37: multirole fighter (was marketed for a time under the designation Su-47)
- Su-47: experimental aircraft
- P-1: 1958, interceptor fighter
- T-3: 1956, fighter
- T-4/100: 1972, supersonic bomber, similar in concept to XB-70 Valkyrie, which was developed by Sukhoi during the 1960s and 1970s.
- T-49: prototype interceptor, modernized variant of Su-11, 1960
- T-60S: intermediate range bomber.
- Su-57: fifth generation fighter. Basic future aircraft of Russian Frontline Aviation. Maiden flight January 29, 2010.
- Sukhoi/HAL FGFA: FGFA is a derivative project from the Sukhoi Su-57 being developed by the Sukhoi OKB and HAL for the Indian Air Force (FGFA is the official designation for the Indian version). Sukhoi/HAL FGFA project cancelled after India left the Su 57 project

=== Planned aircraft ===
- Sukhoi S-54
- Sukhoi Superjet 130

Note: The Sukhoi OKB has reused aircraft designations, for example: the Su-9 from 1946 and the later Su-9 from 1956, the former was not produced in quantity. Sukhoi prototype designations are based on wing layout planform. Straight and swept wings are assigned the "S" prefix, while delta winged designs (including tailed-delta) have "T" for a designation prefix.

Example: S-37 and T-10.

=== Unmanned Aerial Vehicles ===
- Sukhoi Zond-1
- Sukhoi Zond-2
- Sukhoi Zond-3
