= Tom Cooper (military historian) =

Austrian military writer and illustrator (born 1970)

- Born: 1970
- Occupation: Opinion writer, historian, journalist

Tom Cooper (born 1970 in Vienna) is an Austrian military aviation historian, analyst, illustrator and investigative journalist. He has written several books on military aviation history and articles for various military aviation journals.

== Biography ==
After working in the global transport industry, during which he undertook extensive travels in Europe and the Middle East, he became active as an investigative journalist and illustrator for specialized military aviation magazines. He focused on smaller, lesser-known air forces and air wars, primarily in the Middle East and Africa. His experiences and reports on these topics can be found in his books and articles. His interest in post-World War II military aviation led him to research in the field of air power in the late 1980s, especially air forces and regional conflicts between Iran and the Arab countries and the Iran–Iraq War (1980–1988).

Cooper first gained attention in the late 1990s through his online publications on the ACIG (Air Combat Information Group) website. His first three books: Iran-Iraq War in the Air, 1980–1988, Iranian F-4 Phantom II Units in Combat and Iranian F-14 Tomcat Units in Combat, offer insights into Iranian Air Force operations during the Iran–Iraq War and were all co-written with Farzad Bishop. While they garnered little interest in German-speaking countries, they triggered a wave of further publications in Iran and Iraq and attracted considerable attention in the United States. Two further book series followed: African MiGs (two volumes) and Arab MiGs (six volumes), which provide an overview of the operational history of MiG and Sukhoi fighter-bombers in 30 different countries in Africa and the Middle East.

Since February 2022, Cooper has been reporting on the Russian invasion of Ukraine, first on Medium, then on Substack. He has been quoted by publications including Forbes, the Neue Zürcher Zeitung and The New Voice of Ukraine.

== Bibliography ==
- — Bishop, Farzad (2003). Iran–Iraq War in the Air, 1980–1988. Schiffer Publishing. ISBN 0764316699.
- — Bishop, Farzad (2003). Iranian F-4 Phantom II Units in Combat. Oxford: Osprey Publishing. ISBN 1841766585.
- — Bishop, Farzad (2004). Iranian F-14 Tomcat Units in Combat. Oxford: Osprey Publishing. ISBN 1841767875.
- — Nicolle, David (2004). Arab MiG-19 and MiG-21 Units in Combat. Oxford: Osprey Publishing. ISBN 1841766550.
- — Bishop, Farzad; Sadik, Ahmad (2007). The Iran-Iraq War: Air Combat, Part 1. LELA PRESSE Editions.
- — Bishop, Farzad; Sadik, Ahmad (2007). The Iran-Iraq War: Air Combat, Part 2. LELA PRESSE Editions.
- — Sadik, Ahmad (2008). Iraqi Fighters: 1953–2003: Camouflage and Markings. Houston: Harpia Publishing. ISBN 9780615214146.
- — Nicolle, David (2009). Arab MiGs, Band 1: MiG-15 and MiG-17 in Service with the Air Forces of Algeria, Egypt, Iraq, Morocco and Syria. Houston: Harpia Publishing. ISBN 9780982553923.
- — Taghvaee, Babak; Devlin, Liam F. (2010). IRIAF 2010: The Modern Iranian Air Force. Houston: Harpia Publishing. ISBN 9780982553930.
- — Weinert, Peter; Hinz, Fabian; Lepko, Mark (2010). African MiGs, Band 1: Angola to Ivory Coast. Houston: Harpia Publishing. ISBN 9780982553954.
- — Nicolle, David (2011). Arab MiGs, Band 2: Supersonic Fighters 1956–1967. Houston: Harpia Publishing. ISBN 9780982553961.
- — Weinert, Peter; Hinz, Fabian; Lepko, Mark (2011). African MiGs, Band 2: Madagascar to Zimbabwe. Houston: Harpia Publishing. ISBN 9780982553985.
- — Nicolle, David; Nordeen, Lon; Salti, Patricia (2012). Arab MiGs, Band 3: The June 1967 War. Houston: Harpia Publishing. ISBN 9780982553992.
- — Rupprecht, Andreas (2012). Modern Chinese Warplanes. Houston: Harpia Publishing. ISBN 9780985455408.
- — Nicolle, David; Nordeen, Lon; Salti, Patricia; Smisek, Martin (2013). Arab MiGs, Volume 4: Attrition War 1967–1973. Houston: Harpia Publishing. ISBN 9780985455415.
- — (2013). Great Lakes Holocaust: The First Congo War, 1996–1997. Helion & Company. ISBN 9781909384651.
- — (2013). Great Lakes Conflagration: The Second Congo War, 1998–2003. Helion & Company. ISBN 9781909384668.
- — Nicolle, David; Müller, Holger; Nordeen, Lon; Smisek, Martin (2014). Arab MiGs, Volume 5: October 1973 War, Part 1. Houston: Harpia Publishing. ISBN 9780985455446.
- — (2014). Wings over the Ogaden: The Ethiopian-Somali War, 1978–1979. Helion & Company. ISBN 9781909982383.
- — Nicolle, David; Grandolini, Albert; Nordeen, Lon; Smisek, Martin (2015). Arab MiGs, Band 6: October 1973 War, Part 2. Houston: Harpia Publishing. ISBN 9780985455460.
- — Grandolini, Albert; Delalande, Arnaud (2015). Libyan Air Wars, Part 1: 1973–1985. Helion & Company. ISBN 9781909982390.
- — (2015). Syrian Conflagration: The Civil War, 2011–2013. Helion & Company. ISBN 9781910294109.
- — Fontanellaz, Adrien (2016). Wars and Insurgencies of Uganda, 1971–1994. Helion & Company. ISBN 9781910294550.
- — Fontanellaz, Adrien (2016). The Rwandan Patriotic Front, 1990–1994. Helion & Company. ISBN 9781910294567.
- — Grandolini, Albert; Delalande, Arnaud (2016). Libyan Air Wars, Part 2: 1985–1986. Helion & Company. ISBN 9781910294536.
- — Dildy, Doug (2016). F-15 Eagle versus MiG-23/25: Iraq 1991. Osprey Publishing Company. ISBN 9781472812704.
- — Hooton, E. R.; Nadimi, Farzin (2016). The Iran-Iraq War, Volume 1: The Battle for Khuzestan, September 1980 – May 1982. Helion & Company. ISBN 9781911096566.
- — Hooton, E. R.; Nadimi, Farzin (2016). The Iran-Iraq War, Volume 2: Iran Strikes Back, June 1982 – December 1986. Helion & Company. ISBN 9781911096573.
- — Salti, Patricia (2016). Hawker Hunters at War: Iraq and Jordan, 1958–1967. Helion & Company. ISBN 9781911096252.
- — Nicolle, David; Gabr, Ali Gabr (2017). Wings over Sinai: The Egyptian Air Force During the Sinai War, 1956. Helion & Company. ISBN 9781911096610.
- — Crowther, Edward; Fontanellaz, Adrien; Sipos, Milos (2023). War in Ukraine Volume 2. Helion & Company. ISBN 9781804512166.
- — Rikhye, Ravi; Badri-Maharaj, Sanjay; Sawant, Mangesh (2026). 88-Hours War: The India-Pakistan War of May 2025. Asia@War. Helion & Company. ISBN 9781806720859.
