= Multirole combat aircraft =

Military aircraft intended to perform multiple roles in combat

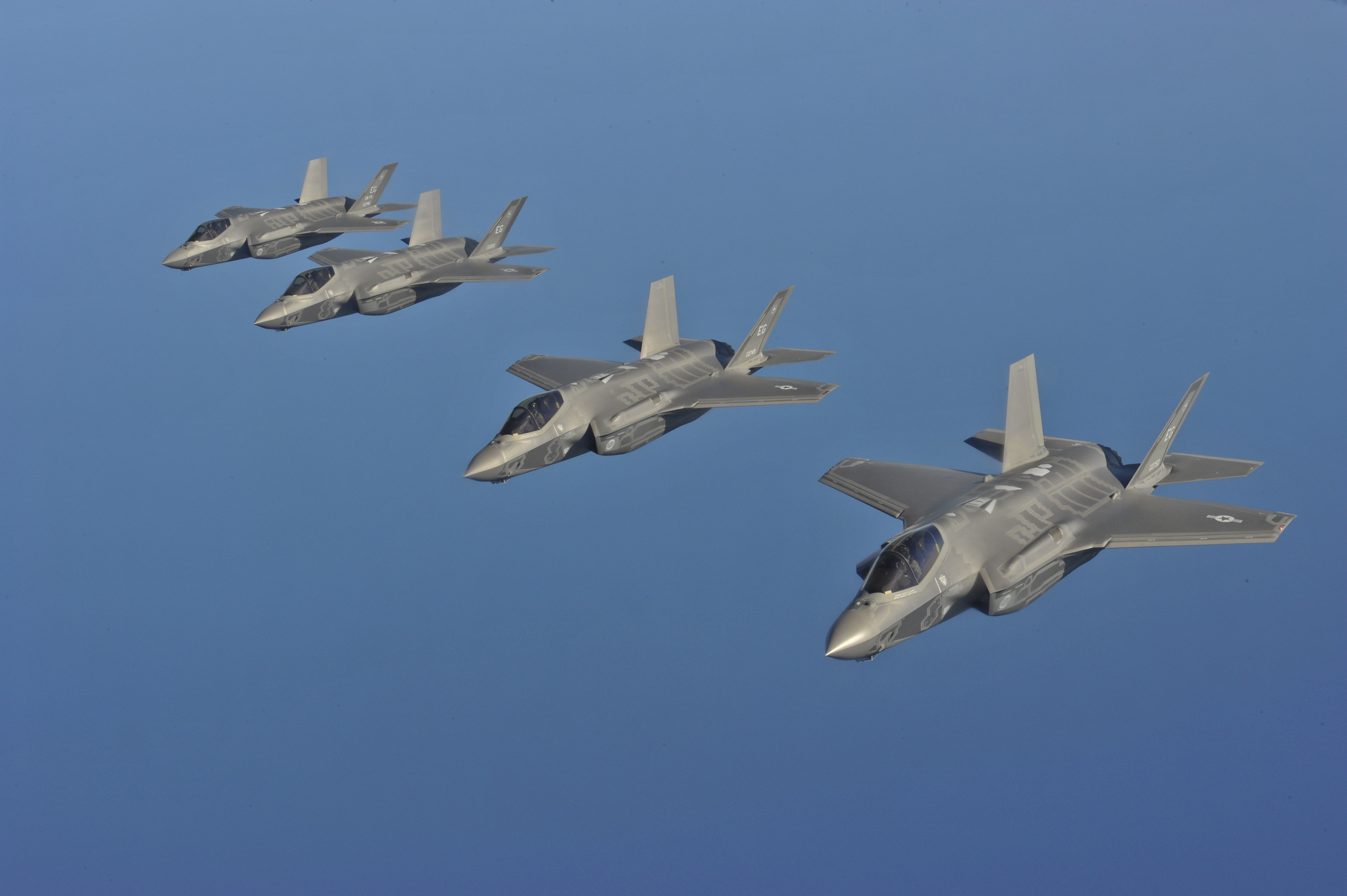
United States Air Force F-35A Lightning IIs, fifth-generation multirole stealth fighters

A multirole combat aircraft is a combat aircraft intended to perform different roles in combat. Aircraft such as the F-35 Lightning II can be called a 'multirole fighter' These roles can include air to air combat, air support, aerial bombing, reconnaissance, electronic warfare, and suppression of air defenses.

== Definition ==
A multi-role fighter aircraft is a type of military jet that is designed to perform a variety of combat missions rather than being specialized for a single role. These aircraft combine the capabilities of air-to-air fighters and air-to-ground attack aircraft, offering versatility and efficiency on the battlefield.

More roles can be added, such as aerial reconnaissance, forward air control, and electronic-warfare aircraft. Attack missions include the subtypes air interdiction, suppression of enemy air defense (SEAD), and close air support (CAS).

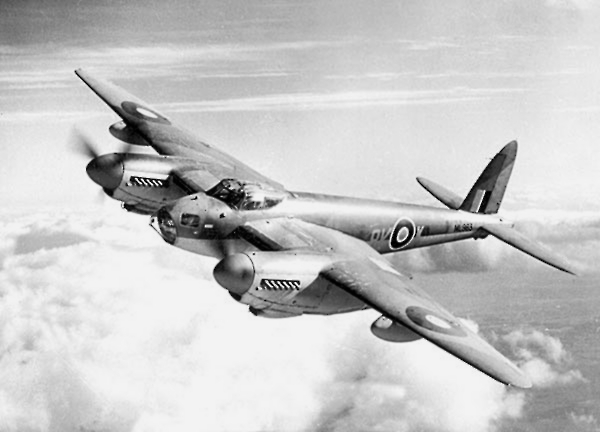
The de Havilland Mosquito was a Night fighter which performed light bombing and reconnaissance during World War II.

=== Multirole vs air-superiority ===
Multirole has also been applied to one aircraft with both major roles, a primary air-to-air combat role, and a secondary role like air-to-surface attack. However, those designed with an emphasis on aerial combat are usually regarded as air superiority fighters and usually deployed solely in that role, even though they are theoretically capable of ground attack. The Eurofighter Typhoon and Dassault Rafale are classified as multirole fighters; however the Typhoon is frequently considered an air superiority fighter due to its higher dogfighting prowess while its built-in strike capability has a lighter bomb load compared to contemporaries like the Rafale, which sacrifices air-to-air ability for a heavier payload.

For the US Navy, the F-14 Tomcat was initially deployed solely as an air-superiority fighter, as well as fleet defense interceptor and tactical aerial reconnaissance. By contrast, the multirole F/A-18 Hornet was designed as strike fighter while having only enough of an edge to defend itself against enemy fighters if needed. While the F-14 had an undeveloped secondary ground attack capability (with a Stores Management System (SMS) that included air-to-ground options as well as rudimentary software in the AWG-9), the Navy did not want to risk it in the air-to-ground role at the time, due to its lack of proper defensive electronic countermeasures (DECM) and radar homing and warning (RHAW) for overland operations, as well as the fighter's high cost. In the 1990s, the US Navy added LANTIRN pods to its F-14s and deployed them on precision ground-attack missions.

=== Swing-role ===
Some aircraft, like the Saab JAS 39 Gripen, are called swing-role, to emphasize the ability of a quick role change, either at short notice, or even within the same mission. According to the Military Dictionary: "the ability to employ a multi-role aircraft for multiple purposes during the same mission."

According to BAE Systems, "an aircraft that can accomplish both air-to-air and air-to-surface roles on the same mission and swing between these roles instantly offers true flexibility. This reduces cost, increases effectiveness and enhances interoperability with allied air forces".

"[Swing-role] capability also offers considerable cost-of-ownership benefits to operational commanders."

== History ==
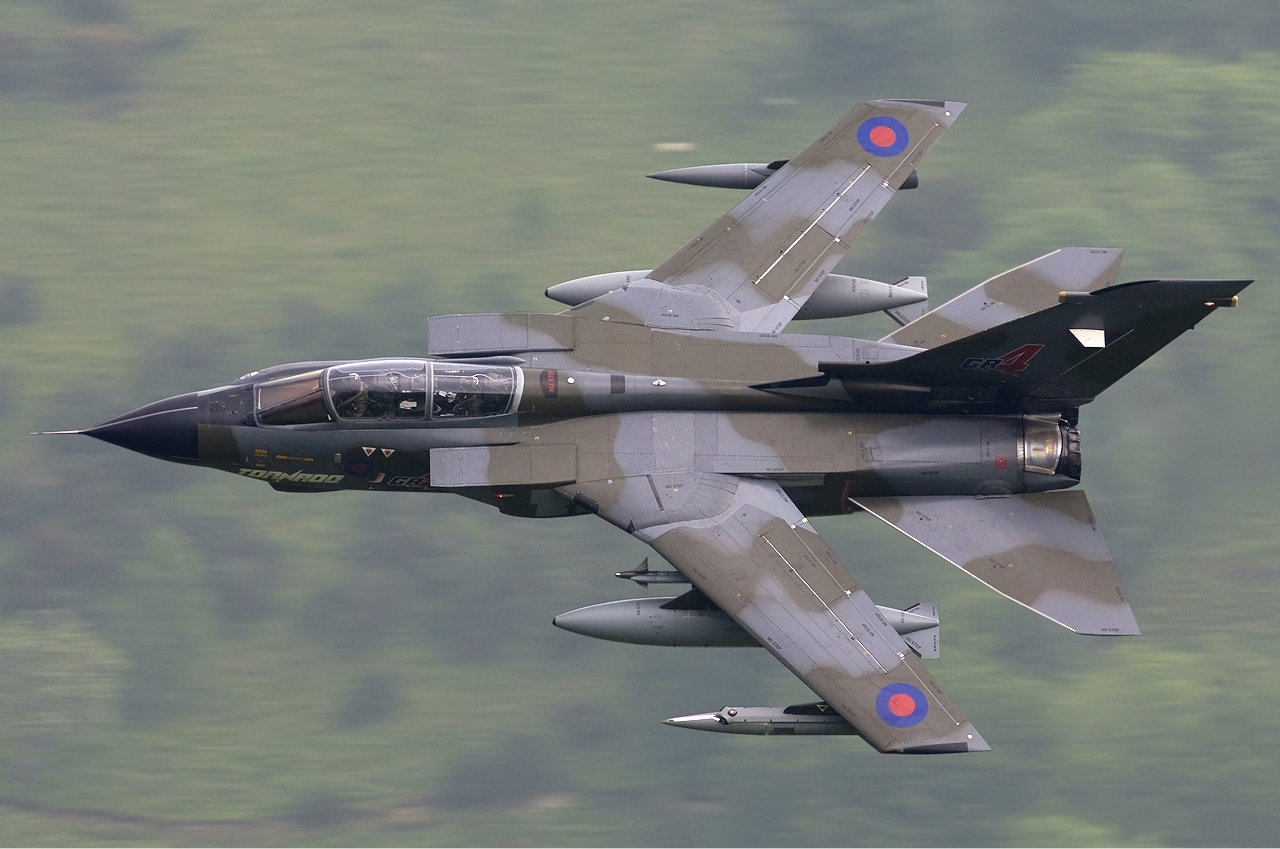
An RAF Panavia Tornado GR4 flying through Mach Loop

Although the term "multirole aircraft" may be relatively novel, certain airframes in history have proven versatile to multiple roles. In particular, the Junkers Ju 88 was renowned in Germany for being a "jack-of-all-trades", capable of performing as a bomber, dive bomber, night fighter, and so on, much as the British de Havilland Mosquito did as a fast bomber/strike aircraft, reconnaissance, and night fighter. The Hawker Hart was also quite 'multirole' in its numerous variants, being designed as a light bomber but serving as an army cooperation aircraft, a two-seat fighter, a fleet spotter, a fighter-bomber (in fact it was one of the most successful) and a trainer.

The US joint forces F-4 Phantom II built by McDonnell-Douglas also fits the definition of a multi-role aircraft in its various configurations of the basic airframe design. The various F-4 Phantom II configurations were used in air-to-air, fighter bomber, reconnaissance, and suppression of enemy air defenses (SEAD) mission roles to name a few.

The first use of the term was by the multinational European project named Multi-Role Combat Aircraft, which was formed in 1968 to produce an aircraft capable of tactical strike, aerial reconnaissance, air defense, and maritime roles. The design was aimed to replace a multitude of different types in the cooperating air forces. The project produced the Panavia Tornado, which used the same basic design to undertake a variety of roles, the Tornado IDS (Interdictor/Strike) variant and later the Panavia Tornado ADV (Air Defence Variant). By contrast, the F-15 Eagle which was another fighter aircraft of that era was designed for air superiority and interception, with the mantra "not a pound for air to ground", although the F-15C did have a rarely used secondary ground attack capability. That program eventually evolved into the F-15E Strike Eagle interdictor/strike derivative which retained the air-to-air combat lethality of earlier F-15s.

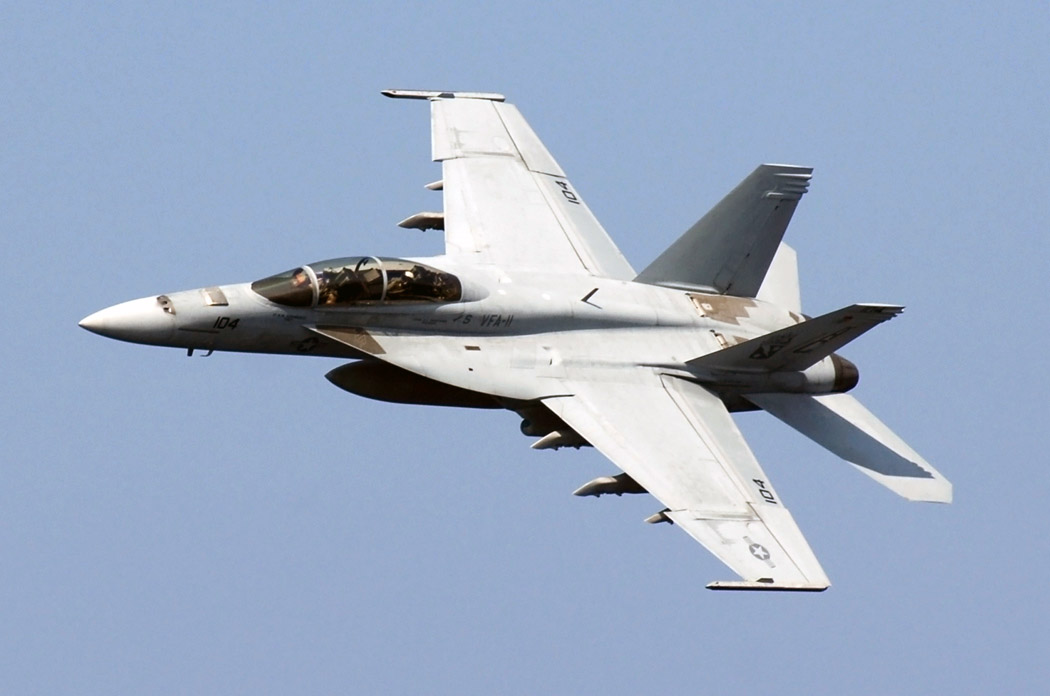
A US Navy F/A-18F Super Hornet

The newest fighter jet that fits the definition of 'multi-role' is the Lockheed Martin F-35 Lightning II/Joint Strike Fighter, designed to perform stealth-based ground/naval strike, fighter, reconnaissance and electronic warfare roles. Like a modern-day F-4, 3 variants of this aircraft fulfill the various strike and air defense roles among its joint service requirements: the standard variant is intended to eventually replace the F-16 and A-10 in the USAF and other Western air forces, a STOVL version intended to replace the Harrier in US Marine Corps, British Royal Air Force and Royal Navy service, and a carrier variant intended to eventually replace the older F/A-18C/D for the US Navy and other F/A-18 operators. The F-35's design goal can be compared to its larger and more air superiority-focused cousin, the F-22 Raptor.

== Aircraft ==
Below is a list of some current examples.

Country/territory	Manufacturer	Aircraft	Introduced (Note: The date the aircraft was first introduced into service)
United States	Lockheed Martin	F-16	1978
USSR	MAPO (OKB-155)	MiG-29	1982
United States	Boeing	F-15E	1988
Taiwan	AIDC	F-CK-1	1992
Russia	KnAAPO / Irkut Corporation (Sukhoi)	Su-30	1996
Sweden	Saab	JAS 39	1997
United States	Boeing	F/A-18E/F	1999
Japan	Mitsubishi	Mitsubishi F-2	2000
France	Dassault	Rafale	2001
Germany; Italy; Spain; UK	Eurofighter	Typhoon	2003
China	Chengdu Aerospace	J-10	2005
Pakistan; China	CAC / PAC	JF-17	2007
Russia	Mikoyan	Mikoyan MiG-29K	2010
China	Chengdu	J-20	2011
China	Shenyang	J-16	2012
China	Shenyang	J-15	2013
Russia	UAC (Sukhoi)	Su-35	2014
Russia	NAPO (Sukhoi)	Su-34	2014
United States	Lockheed Martin	F-35 Lightning II	2015
India	HAL	HAL Tejas	2015
Russia	United Aircraft Corporation (Mikoyan)	Mikoyan MiG-35	2019
Russia	UAC (by KnAAPO, Sukhoi)	Su-57	2020
South Korea; Indonesia	Korea Aerospace Industries / Indonesian Aerospace	KAI KF-21 Boramae	2026 (planned)
Turkey	Turkish Aerospace Industries	TAI TF Kaan	2030s (planned)
Indonesia	PT. Infoglobal Teknologi Semesta	Infoglobal I-22 Sikatan	(planned)

== See also ==
- Air superiority fighter
- Attack aircraft
- Fighter-bomber
- Interceptor aircraft
- Interdictor
- Lead-in fighter trainer
- Light combat aircraft
- Strike fighter
- Tactical bomber
