= Sukhoi Su-8 =

Soviet prototype aircraft

Su-8 (DDBSh)

General information
- Type: Ground-attack aircraft
- National origin: Soviet Union
- Manufacturer: Sukhoi
- Designer: Pavel Sukhoi
- Status: Prototype
- Number built: 2

History
- First flight: 11 March 1944

The Sukhoi Su-8 or DDBSh (Russian: Су-8 ДДБШ - Двухмоторный Двухместный Бронированный Штурмовик - Twin-engine two-seat armored ground attack aircraft) was a Soviet prototype ground-attack aircraft of World War II.

== Development ==
While Sukhoi was perfecting the light Sukhoi Su-6 attack aircraft, the OKB also developed the massive, heavily armed and armored Su-8. In May 1942, the Soviet military commanders had realized the need for an aircraft to support ground offensives operating at a great distance from their airfields, and capable of striking enemy lines of communication to the rear of the front lines. Design work was conducted at an accelerated pace, with work on the airframe commencing from August 1942, even before the drawings were completed on 20 September 1942.

Two prototypes were completed at Plant Number 19 in Molotov in 1943, the first in May and the second in August, with work hampered by the Nazi invasion and need to evacuate the Sukhoi Design Bureau to Tushino. The first flight test was not made until 11 March 1944, and testing continued to the end of the year. Flight testing was delayed due to unavailability of Shvetsov M-71 engines. Although testing was successful, the Su-8 was not approved for mass production. By this time, the Soviet armies had reached the borders of Nazi Germany, and the need for an aircraft with a longer range than the existing Ilyushin Il-2 was no longer a priority.

An attempt to re-engine the aircraft with Mikulin AM-42 engines did not see further development.

The Su-8 was of mixed construction. The cockpit area was armoured, with an aluminum mid-fuselage and a wooden monocoque tail. The wings were of steel and aluminum construction with plywood outer sections. The twin rudders were of all-metal construction. In addition to the cockpit, the engines, fuel tanks and oil coolers were fully armoured, with a total armour weight of 1,680 kg (3,705 lb), more than twice the weight of the armour shell on an Ilyushin Il-2.

== Specifications (Su-8 / DDBSh) ==
Data from Istoriia konstruktskii samoletov v SSSR, 1938-1950, and OKB Sukhoi

General characteristics

- Crew: 2
- Length: 13.58 m (44 ft 7 in)
- Wingspan: 20.5 m (67 ft 3 in)
- Height: 5.085 m (16 ft 8 in)
- Wing area: 60 m^{2} (650 sq ft)
- Airfoil: root: NACA 23014; tip: NACA 23007.5
- Empty weight: 9,168 kg (20,212 lb)
- Gross weight: 12,413 kg (27,366 lb)
- Max takeoff weight: 13,380 kg (29,498 lb)
- Powerplant: 2 × Shvetsov M-71F 14-cylinder air-cooled radial piston engines, 1,490 kW (2,000 hp) each for take-off

1,416 kW (1,900 hp) at 3,600 m (11,800 ft)

- Propellers: 3-bladed constant-speed propellers, 4 m (13 ft 1 in) diameter

Performance

- Maximum speed: 552 km/h (343 mph, 298 kn) at 4,600 m (15,100 ft)

485 km/h (301 mph; 262 kn) at sea level

- Combat range: 600 km (370 mi, 320 nmi)
- Ferry range: 1,450 km (900 mi, 780 nmi)
- Service ceiling: 9,000 m (30,000 ft)
- Time to altitude: 5,000 m (16,000 ft) in 7 minutes 16 seconds

5,000 m (16,000 ft) in 9 minutes

Armament

- Guns:

- 4 × 37 mm Nudelman N-37 or 4 × 45 mm Nudelman-Suranov NS-45 autocannon under the fuselage
- 9 × 7.62 mm ShKAS machine guns (four in each wing with 2400 rpg, one in an LU-100 ventral mount with 500 rounds)
- 1 × 12.7 mm UBT machine gun in a UTK-1 dorsal turret

- Bombs: Up to 1400 kg (3,085 lb) of bombs internally or 2,400 kg (5,291 lb) with three 500 kg (1,102 lb) bombs carried externally
