= Shvetsov M-71 =

1930s Soviet piston aircraft engine

M-71
- Type: Radial engine
- National origin: Soviet Union
- Manufacturer: Shvetsov
- First run: 1939
- Major applications: Polikarpov I-185, Sukhoi Su-6, Sukhoi Su-8
- Number built: few
- Developed from: Shvetsov M-25

The Shvetsov M-71 was a powerful Soviet 18-cylinder two-row radial engine built in small numbers during World War II. It was derived from the Shvetsov M-25, which was a license-built copy of the American Wright R-1820-F3 Cyclone engine.

== Development ==
The M-71 was developed from the Shvetsov M-70, a failed attempt at a two-row version of the single-row Wright R-1820 Cyclone. It used components from the Shvetsov M-63, which was an improved version of the M-25 with more horsepower than the original. Development began at the beginning of 1939 and it was bench tested that August, but did not pass its State acceptance tests until the autumn of 1942. It weighed 970 kg (2,140 lb) and produced 2,000 horsepower (1,500 kW). It was flight-tested in a Polikarpov I-185 prototype fighter in March–April 1942.

A boosted version, the M-71F, was built in small numbers. It was flown in the prototypes of the single-engined Sukhoi Su-6 and the twin-engined Sukhoi Su-8 ground-attack aircraft in 1943–44 as well as the Lavochkin La-7 fighter in 1944. A version of the M-71F was developed with two TK-3 turbochargers and flight tested in the DVB-102 high-altitude bomber designed by Vladimir Myasishchev during the summer of 1943. Evaluations of the M-71 were generally favorable, but no production capacity was available to use for a brand-new engine during the war.

== Specifications (M-71F) ==
Data from Kotelnikov, Russian Piston Aero Engines

=== General characteristics ===
- Type: 18-cylinder, two-row, radial engine
- Bore: 155.5 mm (6.12 in)
- Stroke: 174.5 mm (6.87 in)
- Displacement: 59.7 L (3,643 cu in)
- Diameter: 1,380 mm (54.3 in)
- Dry weight: 970 kg (2,140 lb)

=== Components ===
- Supercharger: geared, 1-speed centrifugal supercharger
- Cooling system: air-cooled

=== Performance ===
- Power output: 2,200 hp (1,641 kW)
- Power-to-weight ratio: 2.268 hp/kg

== See also ==
Related lists

- List of aircraft engines
