= Sukhoi T-60S =

Planned Soviet bomber in the 1980s

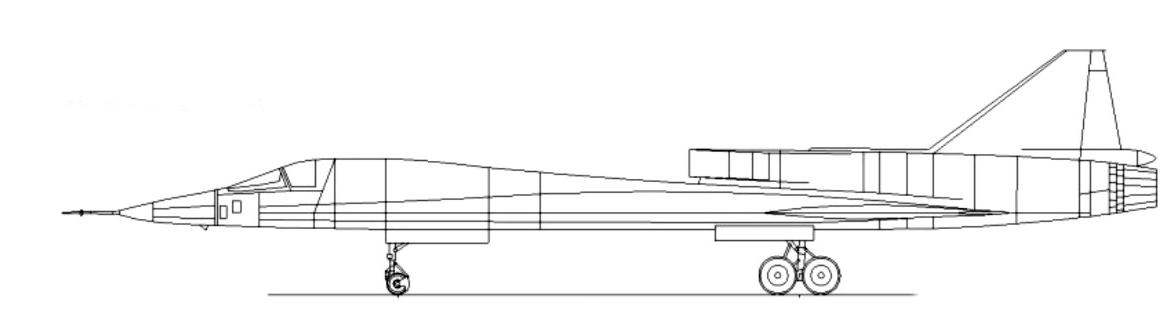

General information
- Type: Intermediate bomber
- Manufacturer: Sukhoi
- Status: Cancelled project

The Sukhoi T-60S was a planned Soviet 1980s replacement for the Tu-22M3. The supersonic intermediate range bomber never got past the drawing board. Very little information is available about technical characteristics of this aircraft, which remains classified by the Sukhoi Design Bureau. It was believed that T-60S would have featured a variable geometry wing, flat lifting fuselage and two engines, equipped with two-dimensional thrust vectoring nozzles. The armament was to include up to six Kh-101 cruise missiles, as well as AS-15 and AS-16 missiles, free-fall nuclear weapons and precision guided conventional munitions. The project was first initiated by Sukhoi in 1984 but was cancelled in the early 1990s. The bomber was to have replaced the Tu-22M in the Soviet Air Force.

== Technical performance characteristics (calculated) ==
- Crew: n / d
- Length: 40 (38)
- Wingspan (Wings swept/unswept) 24 m / 37 m
- Height: 10 m
- Wing area: n / d
- Mass empty: 32,000 kg
- Normal take-off weight: 85,000 kg
- Maximum take-off weight: n / d
- Engines: 2 × turbofans n / a
  - Thrust maximum: 2 × n / d
  - Thrust on afterburner e: 2 × 23500 kgf

== Flight performance (calculated) ==
- 'Maximum speed at height:' M = 2.04
- 'Cruising speed:' M = 2.02
- 'Maximum range without refueling:' n / d
- 'Practical range without refueling:' 6000 km
- 'Fighting radius:' 2200 km
- 'Duration flight a:' n / d
- 'Practical ceiling:' 20,000 m

== See also ==
Aircraft of comparable role, configuration, and era

- Tu-22M3
- Sukhoi T-4
- XB-70 Valkyrie
- PAK DA

Related lists

- List of military aircraft of the Soviet Union and the CIS
- List of bomber aircraft
