= Sukhoi Su-38 =

Type of aircraft

Su-38
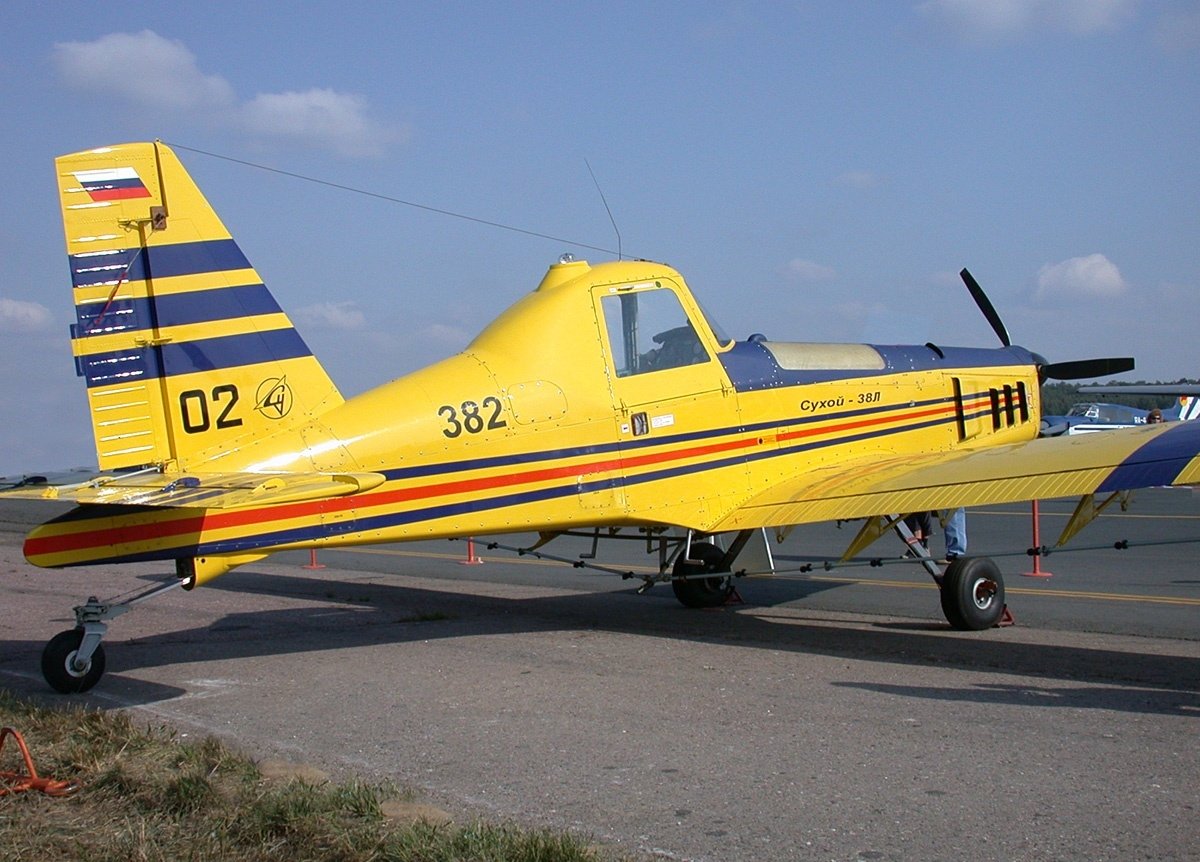

General information
- Type: Agricultural aircraft
- Manufacturer: KnAAPO, NAPO, Smolensk Aviation Plant
- Designer: Sukhoi design bureau
- Status: Under development
- Number built: 1

History
- First flight: 27 July 2001

The Sukhoi Su-38 (Russian: Сухой Су-38) is a Russian agricultural aircraft, the first aircraft of this type to be designed and built by the Sukhoi Design Bureau civil aircraft section (Sukhoi Civil Aircraft (CJSC)).

== Design and development ==
Design originally began in 1993 as a development of the Sukhoi Su-29 aerobatic aircraft. Development was suspended due to economic problems, and when restarted in 1998, the aircraft was redesigned, reducing the aircraft's size and replacing the originally planned M-14 radial engine with a LOM Praha 337S inline engine. The first prototype made its maiden flight on 27 July 2001, with a second flying by June 2002.

== Specifications (Su-38L) ==
Data from Jane's All The World's Aircraft 2005–2006

General characteristics

- Crew: 1
- Capacity: 500 L (132.1 US gal; 110.0 imp gal) chemical hopper
- Length: 8.1 m (26 ft 7 in)
- Wingspan: 11.53 m (37 ft 10 in)
- Height: 2.655 m (8 ft 9 in)
- Airfoil: TsAGI P-31Y (16%)
- Gross weight: 1,200 kg (2,646 lb)
- Fuel capacity: 210 L (55 US gal; 46 imp gal) in two wing tanks
- Powerplant: 1 × LOM Praha M337S 6-cylinder air-cooled inverted in-line piston engine, 184 kW (247 hp)
- Propellers: 3-bladed LOM B-546 ground-adjustable propeller

Performance

- Maximum speed: 150–180 km/h (93–112 mph, 81–97 kn) operating speed
- Stall speed: 76 km/h (47 mph, 41 kn)
- Ferry range: 1,200 km (750 mi, 650 nmi) without spraybars

900 km (559 mi; 486 nmi) with spraybars fitted

== See also ==
Aircraft of comparable role, configuration, and era

- Piper PA-36 Pawnee Brave
