= Sunair Sunlight =

German ultralight trike

Sunlight

General information
- Type: Ultralight trike electric aircraft
- National origin: Germany
- Manufacturer: Sunair UG
- Status: In production (2013)

History
- Manufactured: circa 2010-present
- Introduction date: circa 2010

The Sunair Sunlight is a German ultralight trike electric aircraft, designed and produced by Sunair UG of Scheidegg, Bavaria. The aircraft is supplied as a complete ready-to-fly-aircraft.

== Design and development ==
The Sunlight was designed as an electric powered, self-launching motorglider for the German 120 kg (265 lb) class. It features a cable-braced hang glider-style high-wing, weight-shift controls, a single-seat open cockpit with the pilot accommodated in recumbent position fabric zip-up pod, tricycle landing gear and a single engine in pusher configuration.

The aircraft is made from bolted-together aluminum tubing, with its single surface wing covered in Dacron sailcloth. The wing is supported by a single tube-type kingpost and uses an "A" frame weight-shift control bar. The powerplant is a 15 kW (20 hp) Elektromotor electric motor, recharged in flight by small solar cells.

== Specifications (Sunlight) ==
Data from Bayerl

General characteristics

- Crew: one
- Powerplant: 1 × Elektromotor electric motor, 15 kW (20 hp)
- Propellers: 2-bladed composite

Performance

- Maximum speed: 70 km/h (43 mph, 38 kn)
- Cruise speed: 65 km/h (40 mph, 35 kn)

== See also ==
- Sunair Magic
