= Super Rotor Andorinha =

AC.4 Andorinha

General information
- Type: Sport autogyro
- National origin: Brazil
- Manufacturer: Super Rotor/Montalva
- Designer: Altair Coelho
- Number built: ca. 450

History
- First flight: 1960 (as AC.1)

The Super Rotor AC.4 Andorinha ("Swallow") was a sport autogyro first produced in Brazil in the 1960s. The prototype was built by Altair Coelho and flown in 1960 as the AC.1, a typically minimalist autogyro design consisting of an open framework supporting the pilot's seat, rotor mast, engine mounting and tail fin. Power was supplied by a converted Volkswagen engine driving a pusher propeller. Francisco Mattis purchased the prototype and manufacturing rights and founded Super Rotor (now Montalva) of São Paulo to produce the aircraft. Refinements for serial production as the AC.4 included an extra reinforcing strut for the rotor mast and a larger tail fin. According to Altair Coelho, the AC.4 first flew in 1964, and gained type approval and certification in 1972. 314 were built.

Super Rotor went on to produce a two-seat version with dual controls as the M.1 Montalva, a turbo-charged two-seater as the M.2 Trovão Azul ("Blue Thunder"), and an agricultural version with spray bars as the Agricóptero.

== Variants ==
- AC.1 - single-seat prototype with Volkswagen engine
- AC.4 Andorhina - single-seat production machine with Volkswagen engine. According to Altair Coelho, 314 were built.
- M.1 Montalva - two-seat trainer version of AC.4 with Volkswagen engine
- M.2 Trovão Azul - two-seat high-performance version with turbocharged Santana engine
- Agricóptero - agricultural version

== Specifications (AC.4) ==
Data from Jane's All the World's Aircraft 1987–88, p.20 (except as noted)

General characteristics

- Crew: One pilot
- Empty weight: 166 kg (366 lb)
- Gross weight: 280 kg (617 lb)
- Powerplant: 1 × Retimotor RMV-1 , 60 kW (80 hp)
- Main rotor diameter: 7.60 m (24 ft 11 in)

Performance

- Maximum speed: 160 km/h (100 mph, 87 kn)
- Range: 400 km (250 mi, 220 nmi)
- Service ceiling: 4,000 m (13,000 ft)
- Maximum glide ratio: 6:1
- Rate of climb: 3.0 m/s (590 ft/min)
