= Sunair Magic =

German ultralight trike

Magic

General information
- Type: Ultralight trike
- National origin: Germany
- Manufacturer: Sunair UG
- Status: In production (2018)

The Sunair Magic is a German electric or petrol motor ultralight trike designed and produced by Sunair UG of Scheidegg, Bavaria. The aircraft is supplied complete and ready-to-fly.

== Design and development ==
The Magic was designed as a simple and inexpensive trike, to comply with the German 120 kg class and the US FAR 103 Ultralight Vehicles rules. The aircraft has an empty weight of 120 kg (265 lb).

The aircraft design features a cable-braced hang glider-style high-wing, weight-shift controls, a single-seat open cockpit without a cockpit fairing, tricycle landing gear and a single engine in pusher configuration.

The aircraft is made from bolted-together aluminum tubing, with its single surface Icaro RX2 hang glider wing covered in Dacron sailcloth. The wing is supported by a single tube-type kingpost and uses an "A" frame weight-shift control bar. The design can accommodate any small 27 to 40 hp (20 to 30 kW) piston engine or an electric motor of 16 kW (21 hp). Designed for soaring flight, it has a folding, two-bladed composite propeller.

It is designed to be quickly disassembled for ground transport by automobile.

A number of different wings can be fitted to the basic carriage, including the Icaro Relax 18, Aeros 15T, Aeros Fox T and the ATOS VQ 190.

== Specifications (Magic) ==
Data from Tacke

General characteristics

- Crew: one
- Empty weight: 120 kg (265 lb)
- Powerplant: 1 × electric motor , 16 kW (21 hp)
- Propellers: 2-bladed folding, composite

Performance

- Maximum speed: 70 km/h (43 mph, 38 kn)
- Cruise speed: 65 km/h (40 mph, 35 kn)

== See also ==
- Sunair Sunlight
