= Sundog Powerchutes =

Canadian powered parachute manufacturer

Sundog Powerchutes Inc
- Company type: Privately held company
- Industry: Aerospace
- Headquarters: Pierceland, Saskatchewan, Canada
- Products: Powered parachutes

Sundog Powerchutes Inc was a Canadian aircraft manufacturer based in Sparwood, British Columbia and later in Pierceland, Saskatchewan. The company specialized in the design and manufacture of powered parachutes in the form of ready-to-fly aircraft for the Canadian Basic Ultra-Light Aeroplane category and which also fit the European Fédération Aéronautique Internationale microlight category.

The company seems to have been founded about 2002 and gone out of business in 2014.

The company built two models of powered parachute, the Two-Seater and One-Seater, both similar designs made from 6061-T6 aluminium tubing. In reviewing the aircraft in 2003 Jean-Pierre le Camus described their design as having, "a lot of character".

== Aircraft ==
Summary of aircraft built by Sundog Powerchutes
Model name	First flight	Number built	Type
Sundog One-Seater	2002	At least one	Single seat powered parachute
Sundog Two-Seater	2002	At least six	Two seat powered parachute
