= Sukhanov =

Sukhanov (Russian: Суханов) is a Russian masculine surname, its feminine counterpart is Sukhanova. Notable people with the surname include:

- Alexander Sukhanov (born 1952), Russian poet, composer, bard and mathematician
- Dmitri Sukhanov, Russian figure skater
- Eduard Sukhanov (born 1991), Russian football player
- Nikolai Sukhanov (1882–1940), Russian Menshevik
- Maksim Sukhanov (born 1963), Russian actor
