= Sukhoi Su-80 =

Russian STOL transport aircraft

Su-80
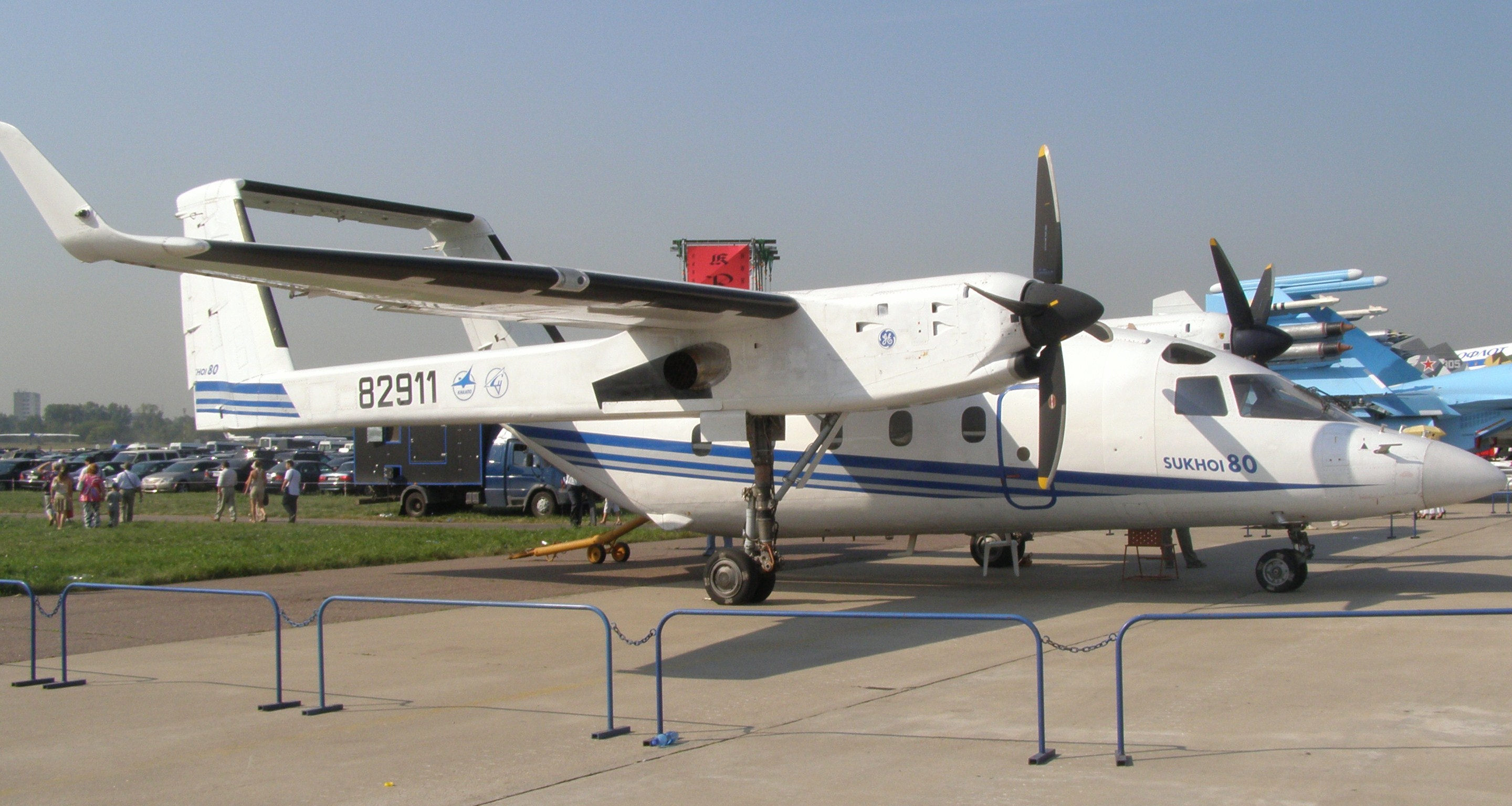
- A Su-80 at MAKS Airshow, Zhukovski in 2001

General information
- Type: STOL transport aircraft
- Manufacturer: Sukhoi
- Status: Retired
- Primary user: Border Service of the National Security Committee of the Republic of Kazakhstan (discontinued sale)
- Number built: 8

History
- First flight: 4 September 2001

The Sukhoi Su-80 (formerly known as the Sukhoi S-80) is a Russian twin-turboprop, twin-boom STOL transport aircraft.

== Design and development ==
The Su-80 program was supposed to start in the late 1990s, but due to lack of funds, it was postponed for several years. A prototype of the combined Freight/Passenger Su-80GP was built and its first flight was planned for early 1998, but the program was delayed again. The first flight of the prototype was at the 2001 MAKS in Moscow issued Zhukovsky.

On 4 September 2001, Igor Wotinzew started with the prototype, 82911, on his first flight. In early 2006, the Su-80 entered production in the KnAAPO factory in Komsomolsk-on-Amur.

The first model of the turboprop transporter Sukhoi S-80 was shown at the 46th Paris International Air and Space Show, 2005. The plane is being developed by Sukhoi OKB and the aircraft factory in Komsomolsk/Amur under the "konversija" program. The aircraft is intended to replace the An-24/26, An-28 and Yak-40, and to compete with the Antonov An-38 . The design of the machine is very similar to the Scaled Composites ATTT and the Rockwell OV-10. It has three lift-generating surfaces: the primary wings; two fins at the rear of the fuselage which join the booms to the fuselage; and the horizontal stabilizer which joins the two vertical fins at the rear of the booms. Two General Electric CT7-9B turboprop engines are housed in bays at the front of the tail booms.

The sleek hull offers space for 30 passengers, and a "beaver-tail" cargo ramp is fitted at the rear of the fuselage, which allows for easy loading and unloading of cargo.

== Operational history ==
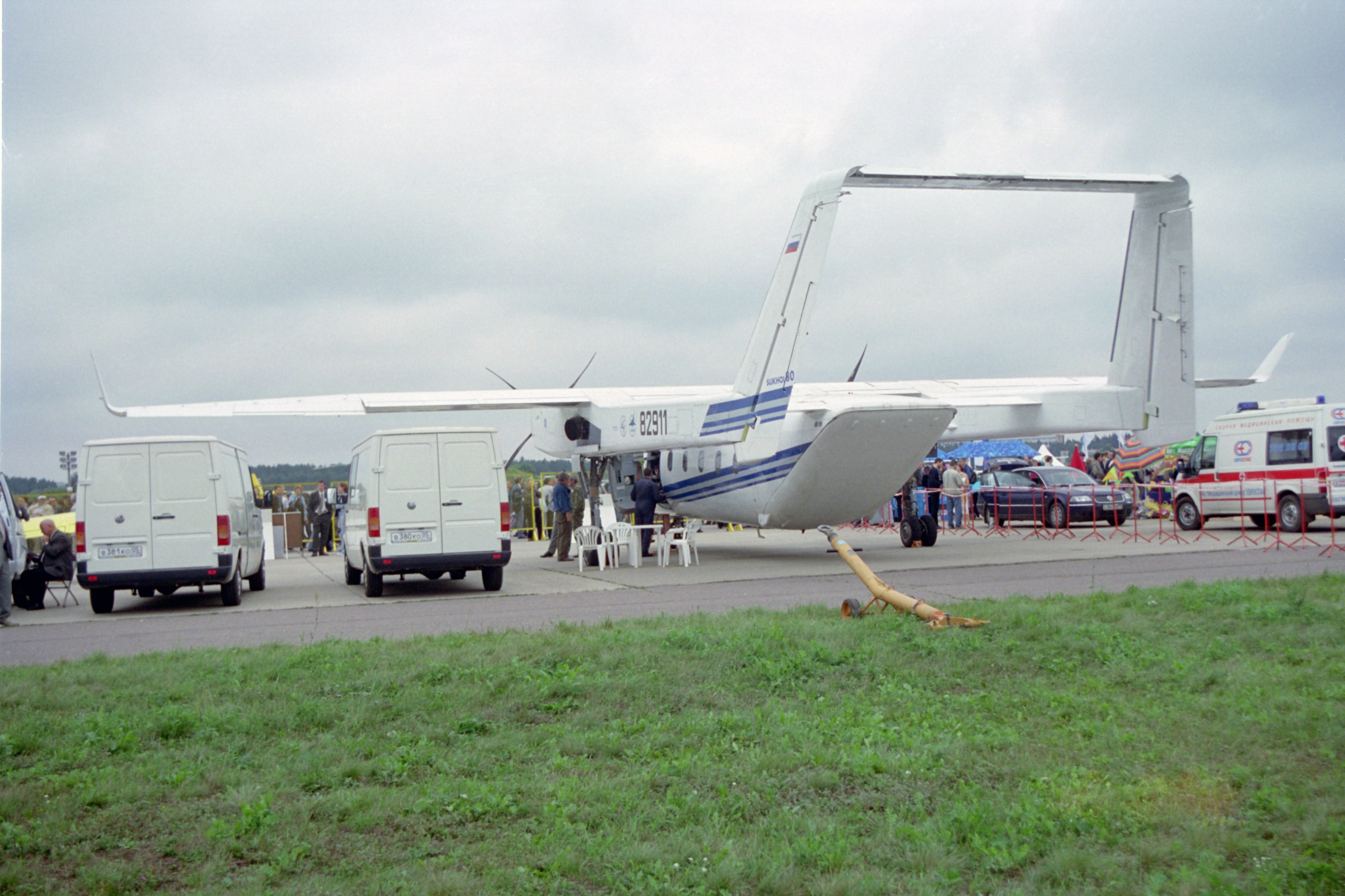
S-80 (rear view) at Zhukovski in 2003

Eight aircraft from the second production (first definitive) batch were earmarked for delivery to customers.

=== Commercial orders ===
Blagoveshchensk Airlines, Chukotavia, Dalavia, the Petropavlovsk-Kamchatsky Air Enterprise, and Polar Airlines all signed preliminary agreements to acquire the type. The KnAAPO factory airline was expected to be the Su-80's first operator.

=== Military orders ===
The Kazakhstan Border Guards tentatively ordered ten Su-80s, while the Chinese People's Liberation Army Air Force, Jordanian Air Force, Royal Malaysian Air Force, Indonesian Air Force and Republic of Korea Air Force all expressed interest.

Ultimately, no aircraft performed active service. In 2022, it does not appear that any of these aircraft are operational.

== Variants ==
There are two different models of the Su-80. The four pre-series aircraft were of a short-fuselage design, while the fifth, sixth and seventh prototypes were stretched by 1.4 m (4 ft 7 in) allowing an extra row of passenger seats.

S-80PC (Su-80GP)
Combination Passenger and Freight carrier
S-80TC
light military troop transport
S-80A
Air Ambulance
S-80F
Fishery patrol
S-80PT
(patrol transport) for the Russian Border Guards, can be armed with machine guns, light auto-cannon, rockets, bombs, and surveillance devices.
S-80GE
Geological support
Su-80GP-100
Transporter

== Specifications (Su-80GP) ==

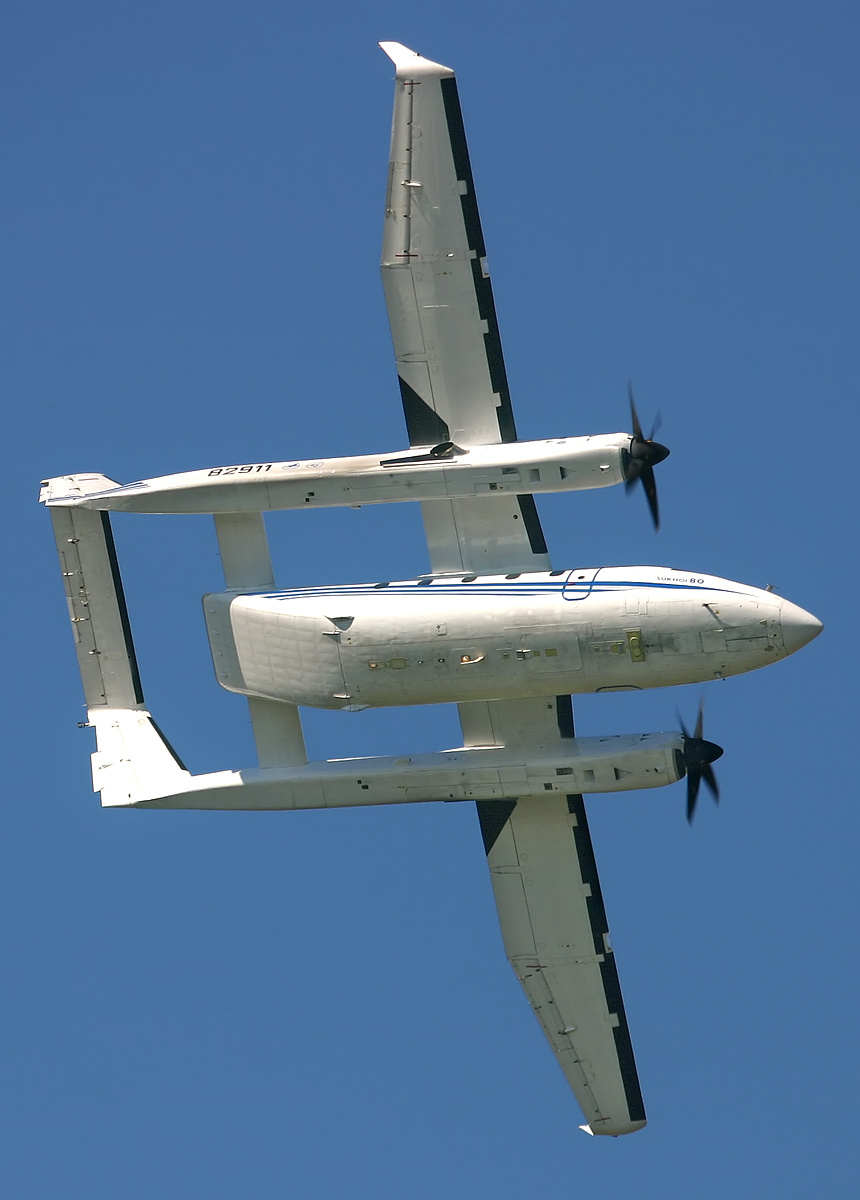
Sukhoi Su-80 at MAKS-2005 airshow.

Data from Jane's all the World's Aircraft 2002–03, Sukhoi and KnAAPO

General characteristics

- Crew: 1 or 2
- Capacity: 30 pax / 3,300 kg (7,275 lb) max payload
- Length: 18.26 m (59 ft 11 in)
- Wingspan: 23.17 m (76 ft 0 in)
- Height: 5.52 m (18 ft 1 in)
- Wing area: 44 m^{2} (470 sq ft)
- Aspect ratio: 12.2
- Max takeoff weight: 13,500 kg (29,762 lb)
- Max landing weight: 13,350 kg (29,432 lb)
- Fuel capacity: 2,350 L (620 US gal; 520 imp gal) in two tanks
- Powerplant: 2 × General Electric CT7-9B turboprop engines, 1,305 kW (1,750 hp) each
- Propellers: 4-bladed Hamilton Sundstrand 14RF-35 or Dowty Rotol fully-feathering reversible-pitch constant-speed propellers

Performance

- Cruise speed: 470 km/h (290 mph, 250 kn) max
- Range: 1,400 km (870 mi, 760 nmi) with 30 pax

2,450 km (1,522 mi; 1,323 nmi) with 1,950 kg (4,299 lb) payload

- Service ceiling: 7,600 m (24,900 ft) maximum certified altitude
- Wing loading: 306.8 kg/m^{2} (62.8 lb/sq ft)
- Power/mass: 0.193 kW/kg (0.117 hp/lb)
- Take-off run: 555 m (1,821 ft)
- Landing run: 840 m (2,756 ft)

460 m (1,509 ft) with reverse propeller pitch

Armament

- Hardpoints: Wing and fuselage hardpoints for bombs, rockets, machine guns and light autocannon.

Avionics

- Elektroavtomatika PNK-80 AFCS
- Rockwell Collins autopilot
- Rockwell Collins EFIS
- Rockwell Collins VOR/DME/ILS for ICAO Cat II operations
- SSI-80 aerial navigation and indication system
- SBKV-P strapdown heading and altitude system
- SVS-80 aerial signals system
- ARK-M automatic radio compass
- A-076 radio altitude-sensing and speed-measuring system
- VIM-95C (VOR/ILS/SP/MRK) navigation and landing systems
- VND-94S(DME) radio range-finder
- SO-94R (UVD) radar responder
- 4205 airborne national identification responder
- RSBN-85C meteorological short-range navigation system

== See also ==
Related lists

- List of civil aircraft
- List of STOL aircraft
