= Sukhoi Su-1 =

Soviet high altitude fighter

Su-1
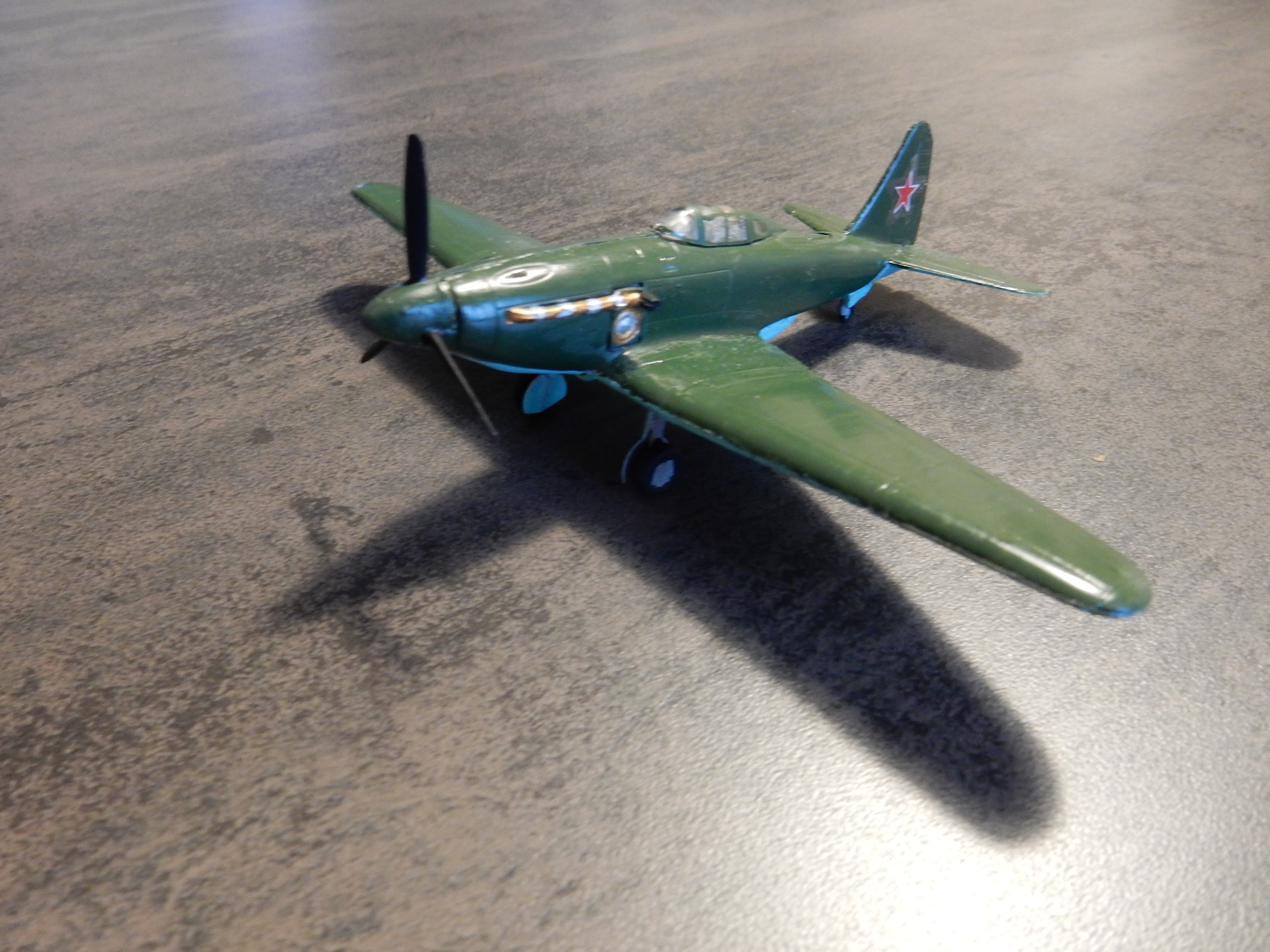
- Model of a Su-1

General information
- Type: High-altitude fighter aircraft
- National origin: Soviet Union
- Manufacturer: Sukhoi
- Designer: Pavel Sukhoi
- Status: Prototype
- Primary user: Soviet Air Forces
- Number built: 1 × Su-1, 1 × Su-3

History
- First flight: 15 June 1940

The Sukhoi Su-1 or I-330 (Russian: Сухой Су-1) was a prototype Soviet high-altitude fighter aircraft built at the beginning of World War II. An improved version, designated Su-3 (I-360), was also built and tested the following year. Neither version was mass-produced.

== Development ==
In 1939, Sukhoi was tasked with designing a high-altitude fighter, the resulting Su-1 was a conventional monoplane with a streamlined wooden semi-monocoque fuselage, low-set all-metal wing made of duralumin and un-pressurized cockpit. The key feature of the aircraft was a pair of TK-2 turbochargers driven by exhaust gases from the Klimov M-105P engine. The prototype was completed at the Sukhoi plant in Kharkov in May 1940, flying for the first time, on 15 June 1940, with A.P. Chernyavsky at the controls. Testing continued until 3 August, when Chernavskii mistakenly landed with the landing gear retracted. After the completion of repairs in mid-September, testing resumed, but an in-flight engine failure on 2 October resulted in a deadstick landing. Limited flight testing continued until April 1941, with the Su-1 reaching a top speed of 641 km/h (345 kn, 400 mph) at 10,000 m (32,810 ft). However, the turbochargers proved unreliable and without them the aircraft was inferior in performance to the Yakovlev Yak-1.

== Su-3 ==
The second Su-1 prototype, built as the Su-3, differed in having a revised wing section with wing area reduced to 17 m² (183 ft²). Completed in 1941, the Su-3 demonstrated better performance than the Su-1, but suffered from continuing problems with the TK-2 turbochargers. Further development was cancelled on 16 April 1941, when production of reliable TK-2 turbo-chargers was delayed.

The fate of the two prototype aircraft is uncertain. According to some reports, the Su-1 was destroyed during the bombing of a train near Novosibirsk, while the Su-3 was destroyed within the city of Novosibirsk during the Great Patriotic War.

== Operators ==
Soviet Union

- Soviet Air Force

== Specifications (Su-1) ==
Data from Istoriia konstruktskii samoletov v SSSR, 1938-1950, The Great Book of Fighters, OKB Sukhoi

General characteristics

- Crew: 1
- Length: 8.42 m (27 ft 7 in)
- Wingspan: 11.5 m (37 ft 9 in)
- Height: 2.71 m (8 ft 11 in)
- Wing area: 19 m^{2} (200 sq ft)
- Empty weight: 2,495 kg (5,501 lb)
- Gross weight: 2,875 kg (6,338 lb)
- Powerplant: 1 × Klimov M-105P V-12 liquid-cooled piston engine with 2x TK-2 turbo-superchargers, 782 kW (1,049 hp)
- Propellers: 3-bladed variable-pitch airscrew

Performance

- Maximum speed: 640 km/h (400 mph, 350 kn) at 10,000 m (33,000 ft)
- Range: 720 km (450 mi, 390 nmi)
- Service ceiling: 12,500 m (41,000 ft)
- Time to altitude: 10.33 min to 10,000 m (33,000 ft)

Armament

- 2 × 20 mm (0.79 in) ShVAK autocannon
- 2 × 7.62 mm (0.30 in) ShKAS machine guns

== See also ==
Aircraft of comparable role, configuration, and era

- Mikoyan-Gurevich MiG-1
