= Sukhoi Su-12 =

Prototype Soviet reconnaissance and artillery spotter aircraft

Su-12

General information
- Type: Reconnaissance aircraft
- Manufacturer: Sukhoi
- Designer: Pavel Sukhoi
- Status: Prototype
- Primary user: Soviet Air Forces
- Number built: 1

History
- First flight: 26 August 1947

The Sukhoi Su-12 (Aircraft RK) was a prototype Soviet reconnaissance and artillery spotter aircraft developed during World War II.

== Development ==
In November 1943, the Sukhoi OKB designed an artillery spotter aircraft based on the German Focke-Wulf Fw 189. As designed, the aircraft had a crew of three and was powered by a pair of Shvetsov M-62 engines. The aircraft was initially denied funding but was eventually approved thanks to an intervention by the Soviet Chief Marshal of Artillery N.N. Voronov. As a result of evolving specifications, the crew was increased to four and the engines were changed to more powerful Shvetsov ASh-82M with 1,640 kW (2,200 hp).

The Su-12 prototype flew on 26 August 1947 with N.D. Fikson at the controls. The test flight program was completed by 30 October. Due to problems with the ASh-82M engines, the powerplant was changed to ASh-82FN making 1,380 kW (1,850 hp), but while reliable, the less-powerful engines caused the Su-12 to miss its top speed and service ceiling specifications. The Su-12 successfully completed government testing in September 1949 and was recommended for production. Due to lack of production capacity in the USSR, in October 1949 it was proposed to build the airplane in Czechoslovakia. However, the application for production was denied, citing failure to meet performance specifications. Subsequent efforts by the Sukhoi Design Bureau to secure funding and continue work on the Su-12 were denied.

== Operators ==
Soviet Union

- Soviet Air Force

== Specifications (Su-12) ==

Data from Shavrov, and OKB Sukhoi

General characteristics

- Crew: 3
- Length: 11.92 m (39 ft 1 in)
- Wingspan: 21.57 m (70 ft 9 in)
- Height: 5.54 m (18 ft 2 in)
- Wing area: 52 m^{2} (560 sq ft)
- Airfoil: root: NACA 23014; tip: NACA 23009.25
- Empty weight: 6,970 kg (15,366 lb)
- Gross weight: 9,610 kg (21,186 lb)
- Fuel capacity: 620 L (160 US gal; 140 imp gal) in two wing tanks and two engine nacelle tanks
- Powerplant: 2 × Shvetsov ASh-82FN 14-cylinder air-cooled radial piston engines, 1,380 kW (1,850 hp) each
- Propellers: 4-bladed AV-9VF21K, 3.6 m (11 ft 10 in) diameter feathering constant-speed propellers

Performance

- Maximum speed: 531 km/h (330 mph, 287 kn) at 5,600 m (18,400 ft)
- Range: 1,140 km (710 mi, 620 nmi) at 1,000 m (3,300 ft)
- Endurance: >4 hours at 1,000 m (3,300 ft)
- Service ceiling: 11,000 m (36,000 ft)
- Time to altitude: 5,000 m (16,000 ft) in 7 minutes 30 seconds
- Take-off run: 230 m (750 ft)
- Landing run: 320 m (1,050 ft)

Armament

- Guns: 4 × 20 mm Berezin B-20 autocannon (1 fixed forward-firing, 2 in the upper turret, 1 in the tail turret)
- Bombs: Up to 800 kg (1,765 lb) of bombs

== See also ==
Aircraft of comparable role, configuration, and era

- Focke-Wulf Fw 189
