= Novosibirsk Aircraft Production Association Plant =

JSC Novosibirsk Aircraft Production Association Plant

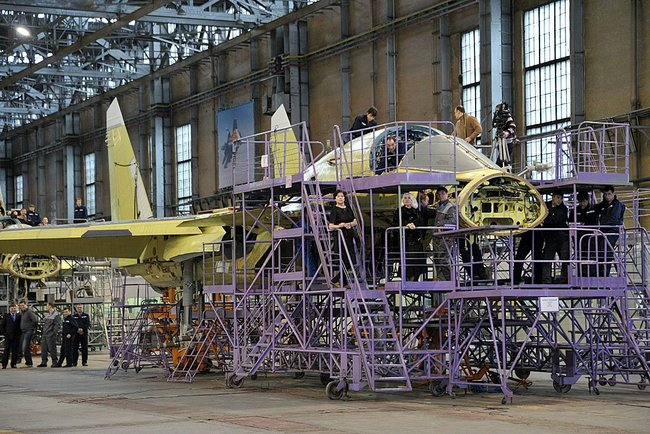
- Su-34 multipurpose bomber assembly shop, March 6, 2013
- Type: Public Joint Stock Company
- Industry: Aviation
- Founded: 1936; 90 years ago
- Headquarters: Novosibirsk, Russia
- Products: Aircraft, unmanned aerial vehicles
- Parent: Sukhoi (UAC)
- Website: napo.ru

JSC Novosibirsk Aircraft Production Association Plant named after V.P. Chkalov (NAPO) is one of the largest aerospace manufacturers in Russia.

The company produces, repairs and upgrades Su-34 fighter-bombers. It is also involved in the Sukhoi Superjet 100 program, where it is one of the two main production sites. NAPO focuses on component production for the program, while the main assembly line is at Komsomolsk-on-Amur Aircraft Production Association. NAPO also conducts repair and upgrade work on Su-24M frontline bombers. In addition, the company is involved in pilot training and education of engineering personnel, as well as production of consumer goods.

The company is based in the city of Novosibirsk. It has about 10,000 employees.

== Products ==
=== Military technics ===
- Production of a fighter-bomber Su-34;
- Modernization of the front-line bomber Su-24M;
- Participation in the creation program fifth-generation fighter
- Project S-70 Okhotnik

=== Civil engineering ===
- Participation in the SSJ regional aircraft program (fuselage elements F1, F6, F5, VO, GO, protective panels of the AFU compartment)

== Awards ==
- 1945 - Order of Lenin
- 1971 - Order of the Red Banner of Labour
- 1981 - Order of the October Revolution
