= Pavel Sukhoi =

Soviet aerospace engineer (1895–1975)

- Павел Сухой; Павел Сухі
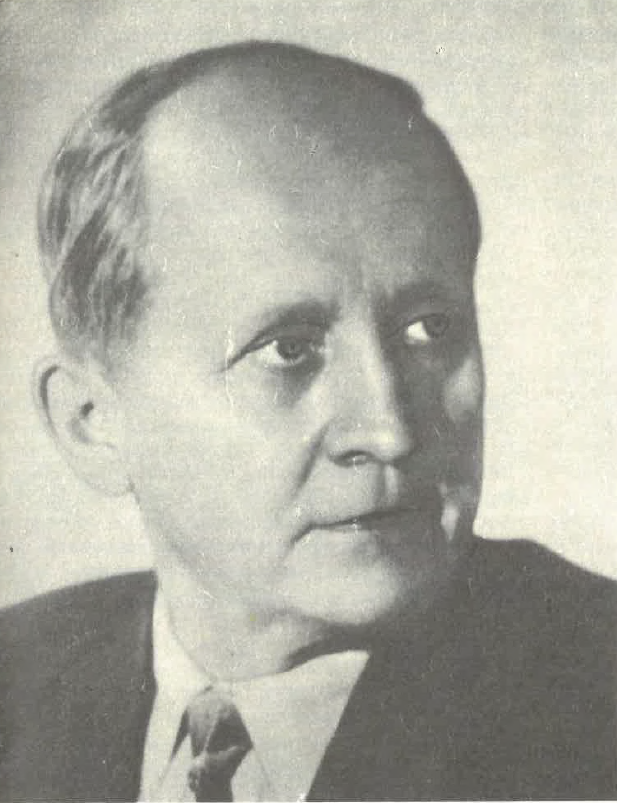
- Sukhoi on a 2020 stamp of Belarus
- Born: 22 July 1895; Hlybokaye, Russian Empire
- Died: 15 September 1975 (aged 80); Moscow, Soviet Union
- Spouse: Sofia Tenchinskaya (1895-1982)
- Engineering career
- Discipline: Aeronautical Engineering
- Employer: Sukhoi Design Bureau

Pavel Osipovich Sukhoi (Russian: Павел Осипович Сухой; Belarusian: Павел Восіпавіч Сухі, Paviel Vosipavič Suchi; 22 July 1895 – 15 September 1975) was a Soviet aerospace engineer and aircraft designer known as the founder of the Sukhoi Design Bureau. Sukhoi designed military aircraft with Tupolev and Sukhoi for 50 years, and produced many notable Soviet planes such as the Sukhoi Su-7, Su-17, and Su-24. His planes set two altitude world records (1959, 1962) and two world speed records (1960, 1962). Sukhoi was honored in the Soviet Union as a Hero of Socialist Labor and awarded the Order of Lenin three times.

== Biography ==
Pavel Osipovich Sukhoi was born 22 July 1895 in Hlybokaye, Vilna Governorate of the Russian Empire, to ethnic Belarusian parents of peasant background. He was his parent's only son, but had five sisters. In 1900, Sukhoi's family moved to Gomel when his father, Osip Andreevich Sukhoi, got a job as a teacher at a school for the children of railway workers. From 1905 to 1914, Sukhoi attended the gymnasium in Gomel, now the Belarusian State University of Transport. In 1915, Sukhoi was admitted to the Imperial Moscow Technical School in Moscow after passing the entrance exams. However, Sukhoi's studies were interrupted when he was drafted into the Imperial Russian Army following the escalation of World War I.

Sukhoi attended warrant officer training assigned to the artillery of the Russian Western Front. Sukhoi was in the Russian Army when it collapsed after the October Revolution in 1917, returning to Moscow to find his university was closed. Instead, Sukhoi returned to Gomel to live with his parents and was offered a place as a mathematics teacher in the small town of Luninets near Brest-Litovsk. In 1919, Sukhoi fled to Gomel as Polish troops advanced on Luninets during the Polish–Soviet War, and began teaching at the school for the children of railway workers headed by his father. Around this time, Sukhoi contracted typhus and then scarlet fever which significantly affected his ability to speak, and he developed a reputation as a quiet person for the remainder of his life.

In 1920, Sukhoi was finally demobilized from the army because of his health-related problems, and the government of the Russian Soviet Republic issued a resolution to reopen institutions of higher education in Russia. Sukhoi returned to his studies at BMSTU and graduated in 1925 with his thesis titles Single-engined Pursuit Aircraft of 300 hp under the direction of aeronautics pioneer Andrei Tupolev. In March 1925, Sukhoi started working as an engineer and designer with the Central Aerohydrodynamic Institute (TsAGI) and Moscow Factory Number 156 under Tupolev. During the following years, Sukhoi designed and constructed aircraft including the record-setting Tupolev ANT-25 and the TB-1 and TB-3 heavy bombers. In 1932, Sukhoi was appointed head of the engineering and design department of TsAGI, and in 1938 he was promoted to head of the department of design. Sukhoi also developed a multi-purpose light aircraft, the Su-2, which saw service in the early years of the Eastern Front of World War II.

In September 1939, Sukhoi founded an independent engineering and design department named Sukhoi Design Bureau (OKB Sukhoi) located in Kharkov. Sukhoi was not satisfied with the geographical location of the OKB, which was isolated from the scientific centers of Moscow. Sukhoi insisted that the OKB should relocate to an aerodrome in Moscow Oblast, and by the first half of 1940 the relocation was completed. By the winter of 1942, Sukhoi encountered another problem: since he had no production line of his own, he had nothing to do. Sukhoi had developed a new ground-attack aircraft, the Su-6, but Soviet leader Joseph Stalin decided that this plane should not be put into production, favouring production of the Ilyushin Il-2.

In the postwar years, Sukhoi was among the first Soviet aircraft designers who led the work on jet aircraft, creating several experimental jet fighters. From 1949, Sukhoi fell out of Stalin's favour and was forced to return to work under Tupolev, this time as Deputy Chief Designer. In 1953, the year of Stalin's death, Sukhoi was permitted to re-establish his own Sukhoi Design Bureau. Sukhoi produced several major serial combat aircraft during the Cold War, including the supersonic Su-7, which became the main Soviet fighter-bomber of the 1960s, and interceptors Su-9 and Su-15, which formed the backbone of the Soviet Air Defence Forces. Sukhoi also pioneered variable-sweep wing aircraft, such as the Su-17 and Su-24. Sukhoi also started a number of projects that were not developed, including the ambitious Mach-3-capable Sukhoi T-3 attack aircraft. From 1958 to 1974, Sukhoi served as a deputy of the Supreme Soviet of the USSR.

Sukhoi died on 15 September 1975 at the Barvikha sanatorium in Moscow, and was buried in the Novodevichy Cemetery. The last fighter Sukhoi designed was the T-10 (Su-27) but he did not live to see it fly.

== Awards and honors ==
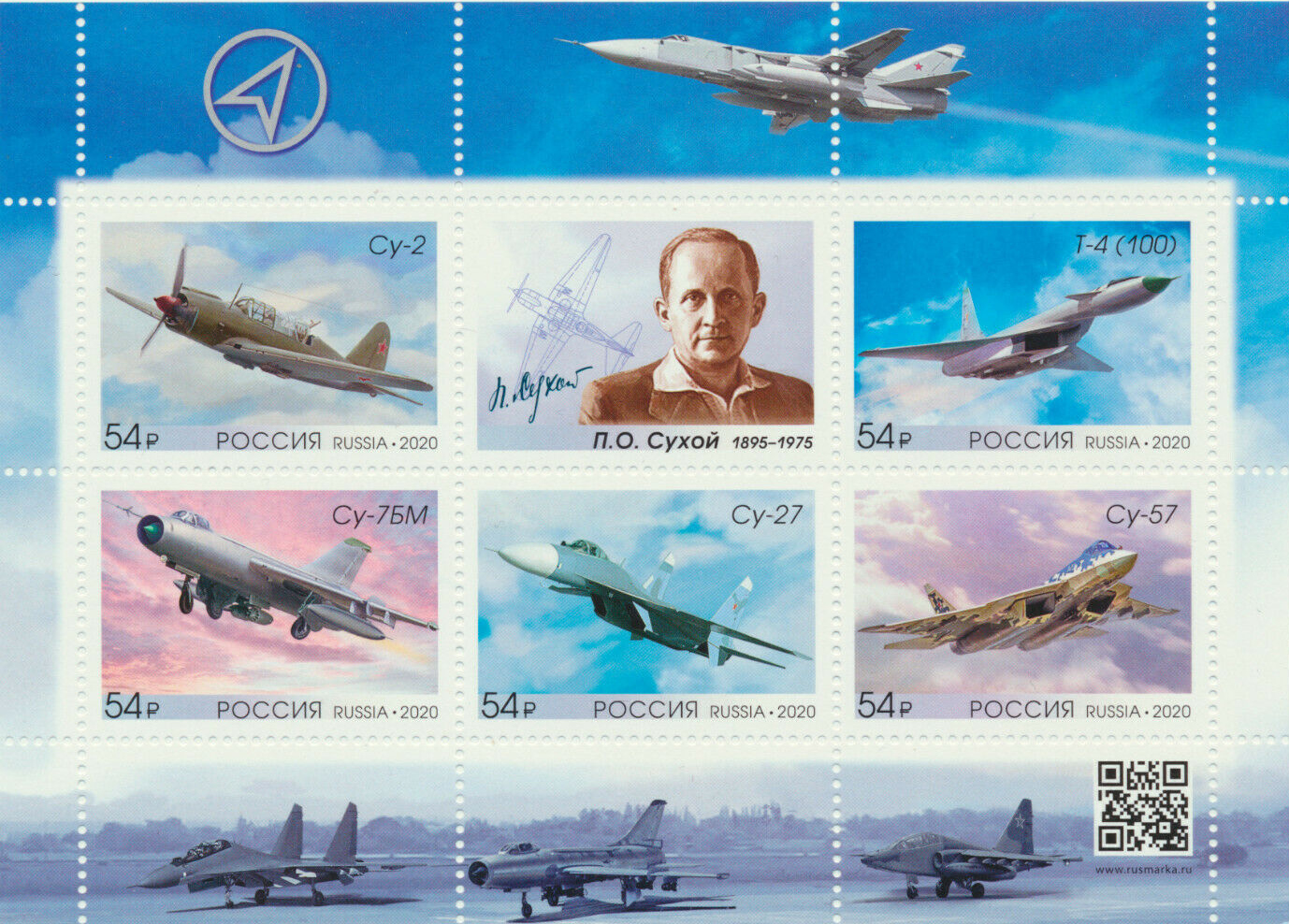
Sukhoi and some of his planes on a 2020 stamp sheet of Russia

- Hero of Socialist Labor (1957, 1965)
- Lenin Prize (1968)
- Stalin Prize, first class (1943)—for the creation of the Su-6
- USSR State Prize (1975—posthumous)
- Three Orders of Lenin (1945, 1957, 1975)
- Order of the October Revolution
- Order of the Badge of Honour (1936)
- Order of the Red Banner of Labour (1938)
- Order of the Red Star (1933)
- Tupolev Gold Medal—For outstanding work in the field of aeronautical science and engineering (1975)

== Memory ==
- Sukhoi Design Bureau is a Russian specialized scientific and engineering design institution; specializes in the design, construction and testing of aviation equipment; bears the name of the founder and first head Pavel Sukhoi; legally registered as JSC Sukhoi Design Bureau; Since January 1, 2013 — a branch, with the name "Sukhoi Design Bureau"; one of the leading aviation design bureaus in the world.
- JSC Sukhoi Company, formerly SUE AVPK Sukhoi, is a Russian company engaged in the design, production, marketing, training of flight personnel, after—sales service, including the supply of spare parts and equipment for combat and civil aircraft the Su and Be brands; created on the basis of the former state aviation plant No. 51; is named after Pavel Sukhoi.

== Cited sources ==
- Kuzmina, L. M. (1983). Генеральный [авиационный] конструктор Павел Сухой. Страницы жизни. Moscow: Molodaya Gvardiya.
