= Sukhoi Su-2 =

Soviet bomber-reconnaissance aircraft

Su-2
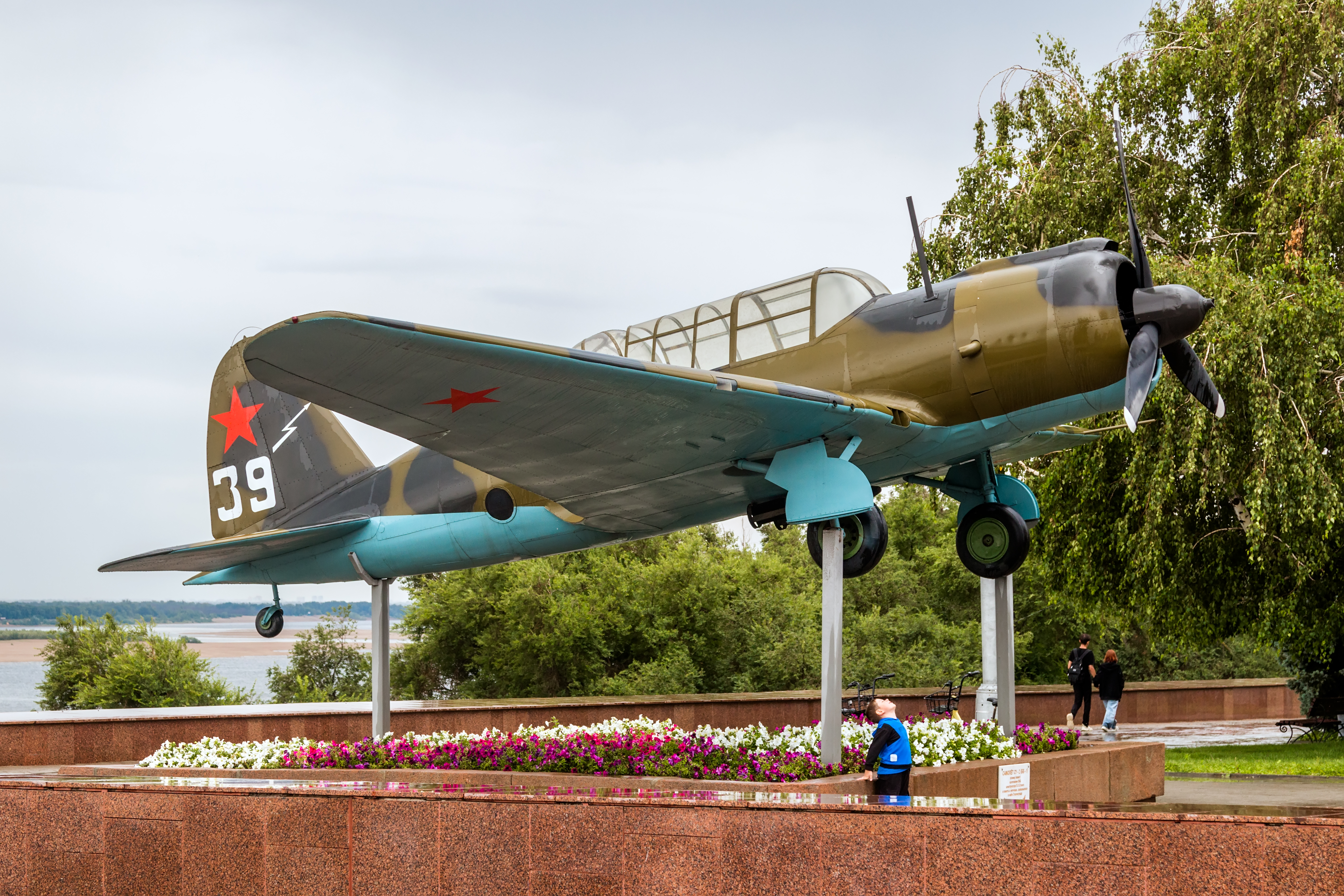
- Sukhoi Su-2 on Volgograd Panorama Museum, Volgograd

General information
- Type: Short-range bomber
- National origin: Soviet Union
- Manufacturer: Sukhoi
- Designer: Pavel Sukhoi; Andrei Tupolev
- Primary user: Soviet Air Forces
- Number built: 910

History
- Introduction date: December 1939
- First flight: 25 August 1937
- Retired: 1944

The Sukhoi Su-2 (Russian: Сухой Су-2) is a Soviet reconnaissance and light bomber aircraft used in the early stages of World War II. It was the first airplane designed by Pavel Sukhoi. The basic design received an engine and armament upgrade (Su-4) and was modified for the ground-attack role (ShB).

== Development ==
In 1936, Joseph Stalin released a requirement for a multipurpose combat aircraft. Codenamed Ivanov, the airplane had to be capable of performing reconnaissance and then attacking the targets it located. P. O. Sukhoi was working in the Tupolev OKB at the time and designed the "Ivanov" aircraft under the tutelage of Andrei Tupolev. The resulting ANT-51 flew on 25 August 1937 with M. M. Gromov at the controls. Powered by a 610 kW (820 hp) Shvetsov M-62 air-cooled radial engine, the ANT-51 reached 403 km/h (220 kn, 250 mph) at 4,700 m (15,420 ft). This was considered insufficient but since the basic design was sound, it was decided to re-test it with a more powerful engine. Equipped with a 746 kW (1,000 hp) Tumansky M-87 engine, the ANT-51 reached 468 km/h (255 kn, 290 mph) at 5,600 m (18,370 ft) and was accepted into production as BB-1 (Blizhniy Bombardirovschik; Russian: Ближний Бомбардировщик — "short-range bomber"). In 1940, the aircraft was renamed Su-2 and the unreliable M-87 engine was replaced with a Tumansky M-88. This lightened version with an M-88B engine reached 512 km/h (275 kn, 320 mph) in testing.

The Su-2 was of mixed construction. The fuselage was semi-monocoque with wood spars and a plywood skin. The wings were of duralumin and steel construction with fabric-covered rod-actuated control surfaces. The pilot and gunner were protected with 9 mm (0.35 in) of armor. The taildragger landing gear was retractable, including the tailwheel.

== Operational history ==
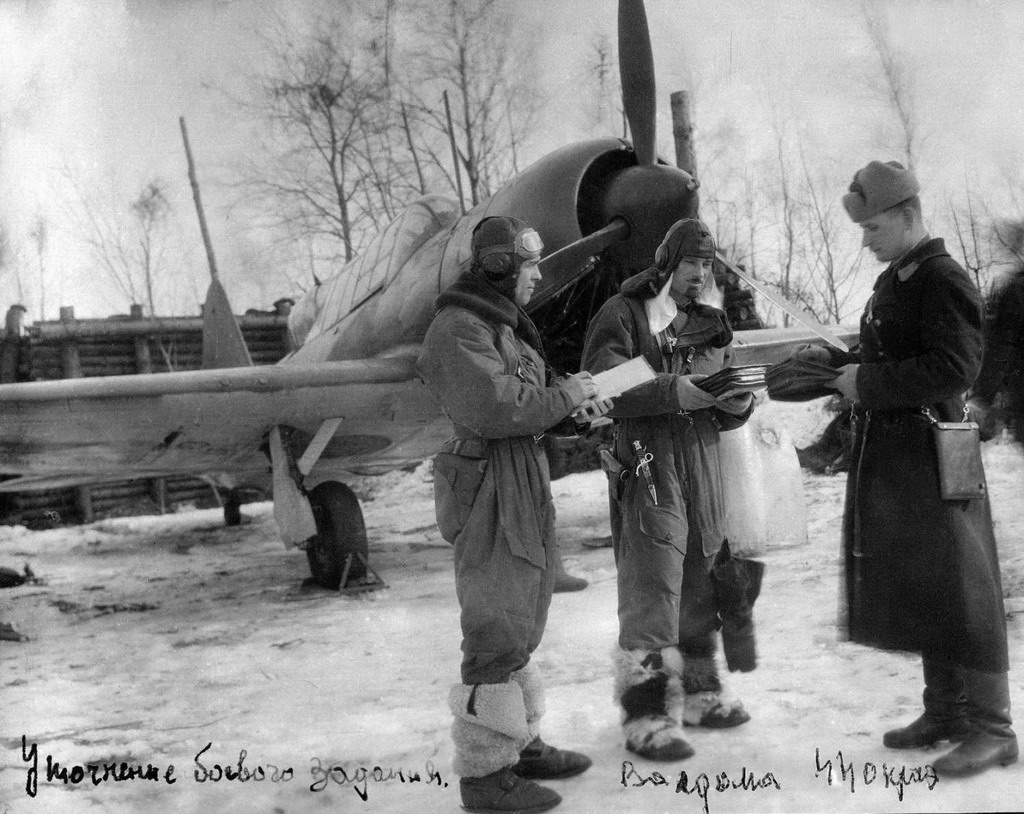
Su-2 flight crew and ground personnel

Although 910 Su-2s were built by the time production was discontinued in 1942, the aircraft was obsolete and under armed by the start of the Great Patriotic War. In combat, the Su-2 ground attack aircraft squadrons suffered heavy losses against the Germans, with some 222 aircraft destroyed. From 1942, the Su-2 was withdrawn from the frontline and replaced by Ilyushin Il-2, Petlyakov Pe-2 and Tupolev Tu-2 bombers. The Su-2 was relegated to a training and reconnaissance role. However, due to a critical shortage of aircraft in early World War II, some Su-2s were used as emergency fighters.

=== Loss rate comparison ===
Although the Su-2 has been criticized due to the number of losses it suffered, its loss rate compares favorably with other attack aircraft used by the Soviet Airforce in World War II.

Type	Average number of missions flown before loss
Su-2	80
Pe-2	54
Il-2 (two seat)	26
A-20	19
Il-2 (single seat)	13

== Variants ==
Su-2

Two-seat light bomber and reconnaissance aircraft. Original designation BB-1.

ShB (Russian: ШБ — Штурмовик Бомбардировщик; "Attack aircraft-bomber")

A proposed ground-attack version with an M-88A engine, modified landing gear which rotated 90° before retracting to the rear into the wings (like the American Curtiss P-40). Bombload was increased to 600 kg (1,235 lb). Created in 1940, the aircraft did not enter production due to availability of the Ilyushin Il-2.

Su-4

An upgraded version, originally intended for the Urmin M-90 engine with 1,565 kW (2,100 hp), but later fitted with a Shvetsov M-82 (some Su-2s were also fitted with M-82). Due to a shortage of duralumin, the structural elements of the wings were made of wood with plywood skin. Wing armament was changed from four 7.62 mm ShKAS machine guns to two 12.7 mm Berezin UB machine guns. One prototype was built and tested, but this improved version was not placed into production.

== Operators ==
Soviet Union

- Soviet Air Force

== Specifications (Su-4) ==
Data from Istoriia konstruktskii samoletov v SSSR, 1938–1950

General characteristics

- Crew: 2
- Length: 10.46 m (34 ft 4 in)
- Wingspan: 14.3 m (46 ft 11 in)
- Height: 3.75 m (12 ft 4 in)
- Wing area: 29 m^{2} (310 sq ft)
- Empty weight: 3,220 kg (7,099 lb)
- Gross weight: 4,700 kg (10,362 lb)
- Fuel capacity: 1,240 L (330 US gal; 270 imp gal)
- Powerplant: 1 × Shvetsov M-82 14-cylinder two-row air-cooled radial piston engine, 1,000 kW (1,400 hp)

Performance

- Maximum speed: 485 km/h (301 mph, 262 kn) at altitude
- Range: 1,100 km (680 mi, 590 nmi)
- Service ceiling: 8,400 m (27,600 ft)
- Time to altitude: 5,000 m (16,000 ft) in 9 minutes 48 seconds

Armament

- 6 × 7.62 mm (0.300 in) ShKAS machine guns (4 in the wings, 1 in rear turret, 1 in the hatch in the floor)
- 10 × RS-82 rockets
- 8 × RS-82 rockets
- Up to 600 kg (1,300 lb) of bombs in the internal bomb bay and underwing hardpoints

== See also ==
Related development

- Sukhoi Su-6

Aircraft of comparable role, configuration, and era

- Douglas SBD Dauntless
- Fairey Battle
- Ilyushin Il-2
- Junkers Ju 87D
- Kawasaki Ki-32
- Mitsubishi Ki-51

Related lists

- List of aircraft of World War II
- List of military aircraft of the Soviet Union and the CIS
