= Sukhoi =

Aircraft manufacturer in Russia

JSC Sukhoi Company

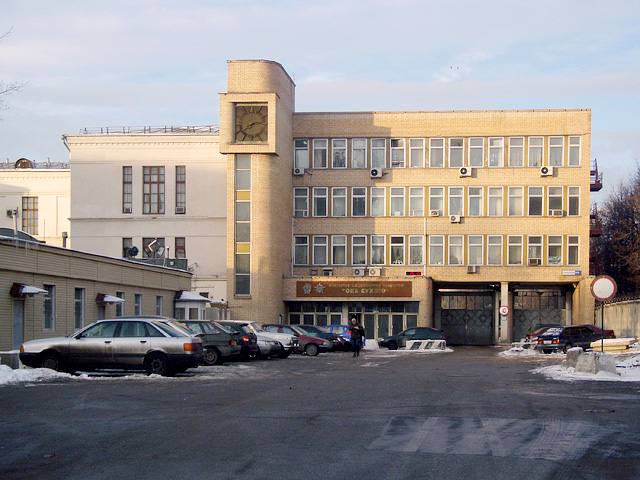
- Sukhoi Company (JSC) head office/Sukhoi Design Bureau offices in the Begovoy District in Moscow
- Native name: АО «Компания „Сухой“»
- Formerly: OKB-51
- Type: Division, joint-stock company
- Industry: Aerospace and defense
- Founded: 1939; 87 years ago
- Founder: Pavel Sukhoi
- Fate: Merged into United Aircraft Corporation
- Headquarters: Begovoy District, Moscow, Russia
- Key people: Pavel Sukhoi (Founder); Yury Slyusar (President of the UAC); Igor Y. Ozar (General Director)
- Products: Civilian aircraft, military aircraft, unmanned aerial vehicles
- Revenue: $1.61 billion (2016; 2011)
- Operating income: $76 million (2016; 2011)
- Net income: $35.1 million (2016; 2011)
- Total assets: $6.15 billion (2016)
- Total equity: $2.74 billion (2016)
- Number of employees: 26,177 (2011)
- Parent: United Aircraft Corporation
- Website: www.uacrussia.ru/en

The JSC Sukhoi Company (Russian: АО «Компания „Сухой“», Russian pronunciation: [sʊˈxoj]) is a Russian aircraft manufacturer headquartered in Begovoy District, Northern Administrative Okrug, Moscow, that designs both civilian and military aircraft.

Sukhoi was founded in the Soviet Union by Pavel Sukhoi in 1939 as the Sukhoi Design Bureau (OKB-51, design office prefix Su), and survived the dissolution of the Soviet Union. In February 2006, the Russian government merged Sukhoi with Mikoyan, Ilyushin, Irkut, Tupolev, and Yakovlev as a new company named United Aircraft Corporation.

== History ==
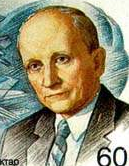
A cropped stamp of Pavel Sukhoi, the founder of the Sukhoi Design Bureau

=== Origins ===
In March 1930, nine years before the creation of the bureau, Pavel Sukhoi, an aerospace engineer, took over team no. 4 of the TsAGI's AGOS ("Aviation, Hydro-aviation and Experimental Construction") engineering facility. Under Sukhoi's leadership, the team of the future design bureau started to take shape. The team, under the Tupolev OKB, produced experimental fighters such as the I-3, I-14, the DIP (a record-breaking RD aircraft), the long-range Tupolev ANT-25, flown by famous Soviet aviators, Valery Chkalov and Mikhail Gromov, and the long-range bombers such as the Tupolev TB-1 and the Tupolev TB-3.

In 1936, Joseph Stalin, leader of the Soviet Union, issued a requirement for a multirole combat aircraft. As a result, Sukhoi and his team developed the BB-1, a reconnaissance aircraft and light bomber in 1937. The BB-1 was approved, and under a July 29, 1939 government resolution, the Sukhoi OKB, designated OKB-51 and called the Sukhoi Design Bureau, was developed to establish production for the aircraft. The BB-1 was introduced and later adopted by the Soviet Air Forces in the same year. A year later, the BB-1 was designated the Sukhoi Su-2. A total of 910 Su-2 aircraft were built. The resolution also made Sukhoi chief designer, gave Sukhoi's team of the design bureau standalone status and relocation of the bureau to the Production Aircraft Plant No. 135 in Kharkiv, Ukrainian Soviet Socialist Republic. However, Sukhoi was not satisfied with its location, since it was isolated from the scientific pole of Moscow. Sukhoi later relocated the bureau to the aerodrome of Moscow Oblast, completing half of the relocation by 1940. Sukhoi encountered another issue: the bureau had no production line in Moscow, thus making it useless as Sukhoi had nothing to do.

=== World War II ===
During the Nazi invasion of the Soviet Union in World War II, the Su-2 needed a successor, as it was proved obsolete and under-armed against Nazi aircraft, with 222 aircraft destroyed in total. Sukhoi and his bureau designed a two-seat armored ground-attack aircraft, the Sukhoi Su-6, considered in some terms to be superior to its competitor, the Ilyushin Il-2. The government, however, later chose the Il-2 over the Su-6, but rewarded Sukhoi a Stalin Prize of the 1st Level for its development in 1943. Sukhoi and this team later focused on development of variants of the Su-2, the prototype cannon-armed Sukhoi Su-1 (Su-3) fighter, as well as the Sukhoi Su-8, which to serve as a long-range ground-attack aircraft for the Soviet Air Forces, but was later discarded as the Soviet Union was winning the Eastern Front.

=== Cold War ===
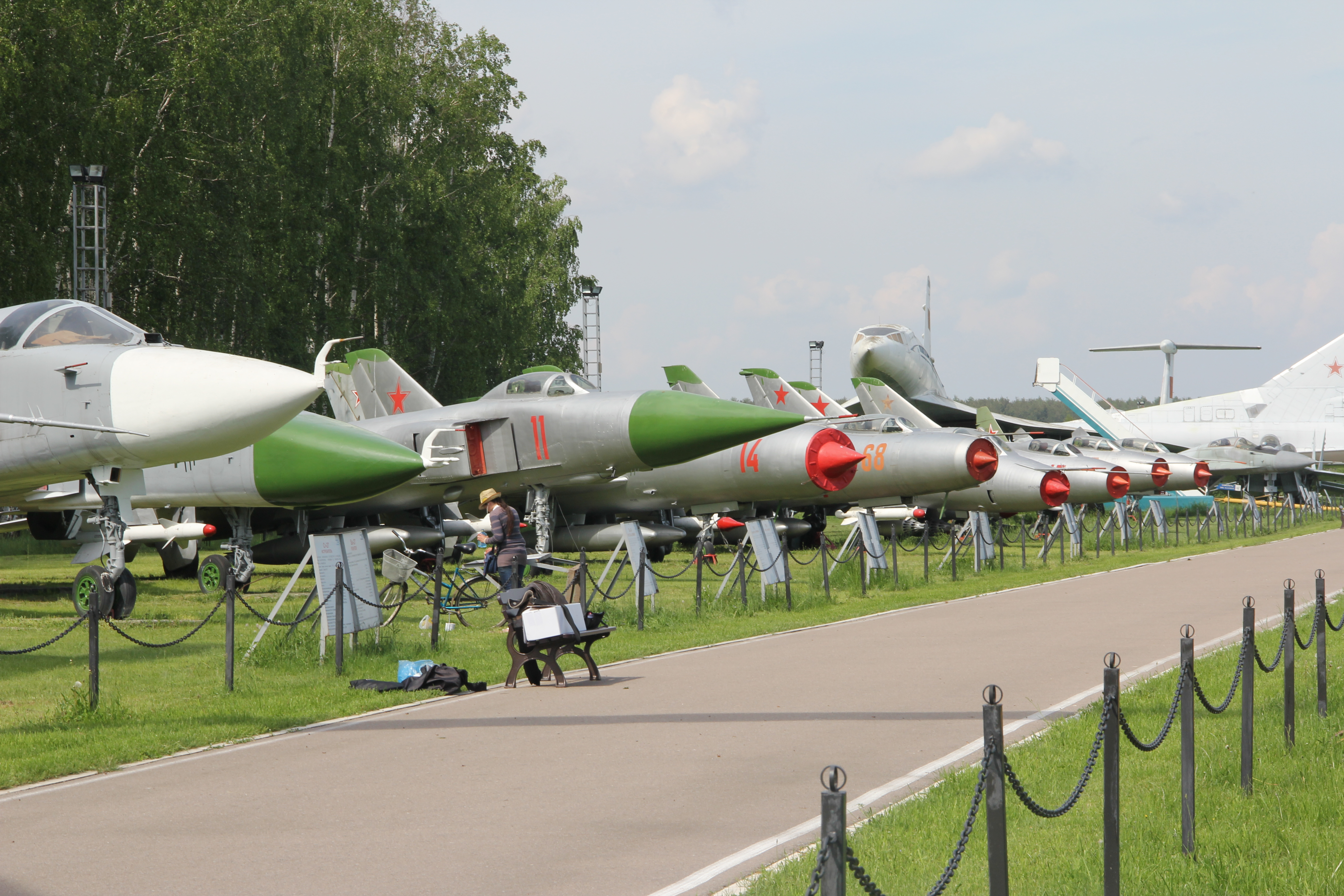
A line of Sukhoi combat aircraft at Central Air Force Museum Monino

After the war, Sukhoi and his team were among the first Soviet aircraft designers who led the work on jet aircraft, creating several experimental jet fighters. Sukhoi started developing two mixed-power fighters, the Sukhoi Su-5 and a modification of the Sukhoi Su-6 named Su-7 before 1945. At the start of 1945, the design bureau started working on jet fighters such as the Sukhoi Su-9, Sukhoi Su-11, Sukhoi Su-15, and the Sukhoi Su-17, the Sukhoi Su-10 jet-propulsed bomber, and the reconnaissance and artillery spotter twinjet, the Sukhoi Su-12. Sukhoi and his team also used the Tupolev Tu-2 bomber to develop and produce the trainer bomber UTB-2, worked on passenger and troop-carrying aircraft, the jet fighter Sukhoi Su-14, and several other aircraft.

From 1945 to 1950, Sukhoi and his team also developed the Soviet Union's first booster aircraft control system, drogue parachute, catapult ejection seat with telescopic trolley, and a jettisonable nose with a pressurized cockpit. From 1949, Sukhoi fell out of Stalin's favor and in a government resolution, the Sukhoi Design Bureau was scrapped, and Sukhoi was forced to return to work under Andrei Tupolev, this time as Deputy Chief Designer. In 1953, the year of Stalin's death, he was permitted to reestablish his own Sukhoi Design Bureau, which was set up with new production facilities.

=== Contemporary era ===
Previous Sukhoi logo

After the dissolution of the Soviet Union, each of the multitude of bureaus and factories producing Sukhoi components was privatized independently. In the early 1990s, Sukhoi started diversifying its products and initiated Sukhoi Civil Aircraft to create a line of civil aviation projects for the company. The progress made by the new branch would lead to the development of the utility aircraft, the Su-80, and the agricultural aircraft, the Su-38, less than a decade later. In 1996, the government re-gathered the major part of them forming Sukhoi Aviation Military Industrial Combine (Sukhoi AIMC). In parallel, other entities, including Ulan Ude factory, Tbilisi factory, Belarus and Ukraine factories, established alternate transnational Sukhoi Attack Aircraft (planning to produce e.g. Su-25 TM).

The Sukhoi AIMC is composed of the joint-stock company Sukhoi Design Bureau and the JSC Sukhoi Civil Aircraft, located in Moscow, the Novosibirsk Aircraft Production Association (NAPA), located in Novosibirsk, and the Komsomolsk-on-Amur Aircraft Production Association (KnAAPO), located in Komsomolsk-on-Amur. Sukhoi is headquartered in Moscow. Finmeccanica (since 2017, Leonardo) owns 25% + 1 share of Sukhoi's civil division. The Russian government merged Sukhoi with Mikoyan, Ilyushin, Irkut, Tupolev, and Yakovlev as a new company named United Aircraft Corporation in February 2006. Mikoyan and Sukhoi were placed within the same operating unit. In September 2007, Sukhoi launched its first modern commercial regional airliner—the Superjet 100 (SSJ 100), a 78 to 98 seater, built by Sukhoi. It was unveiled at Komsomolsk-on-Amur. The maiden flight was made on May 19, 2008. In March 2008, Sukhoi was selected to design and produce the carbon fiber composite wings for Irkut's MC-21's airframe. Sukhoi is also working on what is to be Russia's fifth-generation stealth fighter, the Sukhoi Su-57. The maiden flight took place on the 29 January 2010.

As of January 2015, Sukhoi is working on a family of the regional airliner: the Sukhoi Superjet 100, such as the jet airliner Superjet 130, which would have a seating capacity of 130 to 145 seats, and to bridge the gap of Russian aircraft between the Superjet Stretch and the Irkut MC-21.

=== Integration of the Irkut Corporation ===
At the end of November 2018, United Aircraft Corporation transferred SCAC from Sukhoi to the Irkut Corporation, to become UAC's airliner division, as Leonardo S.p.A. pulled out in early 2017 because of Superjet's poor financial performance. Irkut will manage the Superjet 100, the MC-21 and the Russo-Chinese CR929 widebody, but the Il-114 passenger turboprop and modernized Ilyushin Il-96-400 widebody will stay with Ilyushin. The new commercial division will also include the Yakovlev Design Bureau, avionics specialist UAC—Integration Center and composite manufacturer AeroComposit.

Sukhoi Civil Aircraft Company (SCAC), a developer and manufacturer of SuperJet aircraft, ceased operations as an independent legal entity and became a branch of IRKUT Corporation, changing its name to Regional aircraft. This is stated on the company's website.

"Within the implementation of the strategy uniting civil aircraft companies into one Civil Aviation Division JSC “SCA” has been integrated into Irkut Corporation since February 17, 2020. JSC “SCA” Shareholders adopted the decision on June 27, 2019. Regional Aircraft – Branch of the Irkut Corporation shall resume the continuity of business in the areas of development, production and aftersales support of the aircraft," - it is stated on corporate website in the section "Company".

In June 2023 patents for a new design of a single-engine Su-75 stealth fighter were filed and given the codename "Checkmate". The design has taken three years, and test aircraft are under construction.

On 23 February 2024, smoke was seen emerging from a warehouse located on the site of Sukhoi Design Bureau's headquarters in Moscow. On 14 June 2024, another fire, this time more serious, broke out in a different building at the same site in Moscow, collapsing the roof of the latter. An area of some 800 square meters was destroyed. However, officials said the building wasn't in use then. Over 70 firefighters and 25 units were used to put out this fire.

== Organization ==
- JSC Sukhoi Company
  - CJSC Sukhoi Civil Aircraft (now acquired by Irkut Corporation and renamed: Regional Aircraft – Branch of the Irkut Corporation)
  - JSC Sukhoi Design Bureau
  - JSC Sukhoi Holdings
  - Branches
    - Komsomolsk-on-Amur Aircraft Production Association (KnAAPO)
    - Novosibirsk Aircraft Production Association (NAPO)

== Corporate governance ==
=== Chairman of Board of Directors ===
- Yury B. Slyusar, President of the UAC

=== General Director ===
- Igor Y. Ozar

=== Members of Board of Directors ===
Members are elected by the annual general meeting of shareholders of the PJSC Sukhoi Company, with the election recently on June 28, 2017.

- Ivan M. Goncharenko
- Oleg Y. Demidov
- Oleg F. Demchenko
- Sergei N. Konosov
- Nikolai F. Nikitin
- Igor Y. Ozar, General Director of the PJSC Sukhoi Company
- Yuri B. Slyusar, President of the UAC
- Alexander V. Tulyakov
- Sergei V. Yarkovoy

== See also ==
- List of Sukhoi aircraft
- List of military aircraft of the Soviet Union and the CIS
