= Komsomolsk-on-Amur Aircraft Plant =

Russian aerospace manufacturer

Coordinates: 50°35′31″N 137°5′25″E

- Industry: Aerospace industry
- Founded: 1927; 99 years ago
- Headquarters: Komsomolsk-on-Amur
- Products: Commercial and military aircraft
- Revenue: 80,000,000,000 Russian ruble (2014)
- Number of employees: 13,500 (2011)
- Parent: Sukhoi (UAC)
- Website: www.knaapo.ru

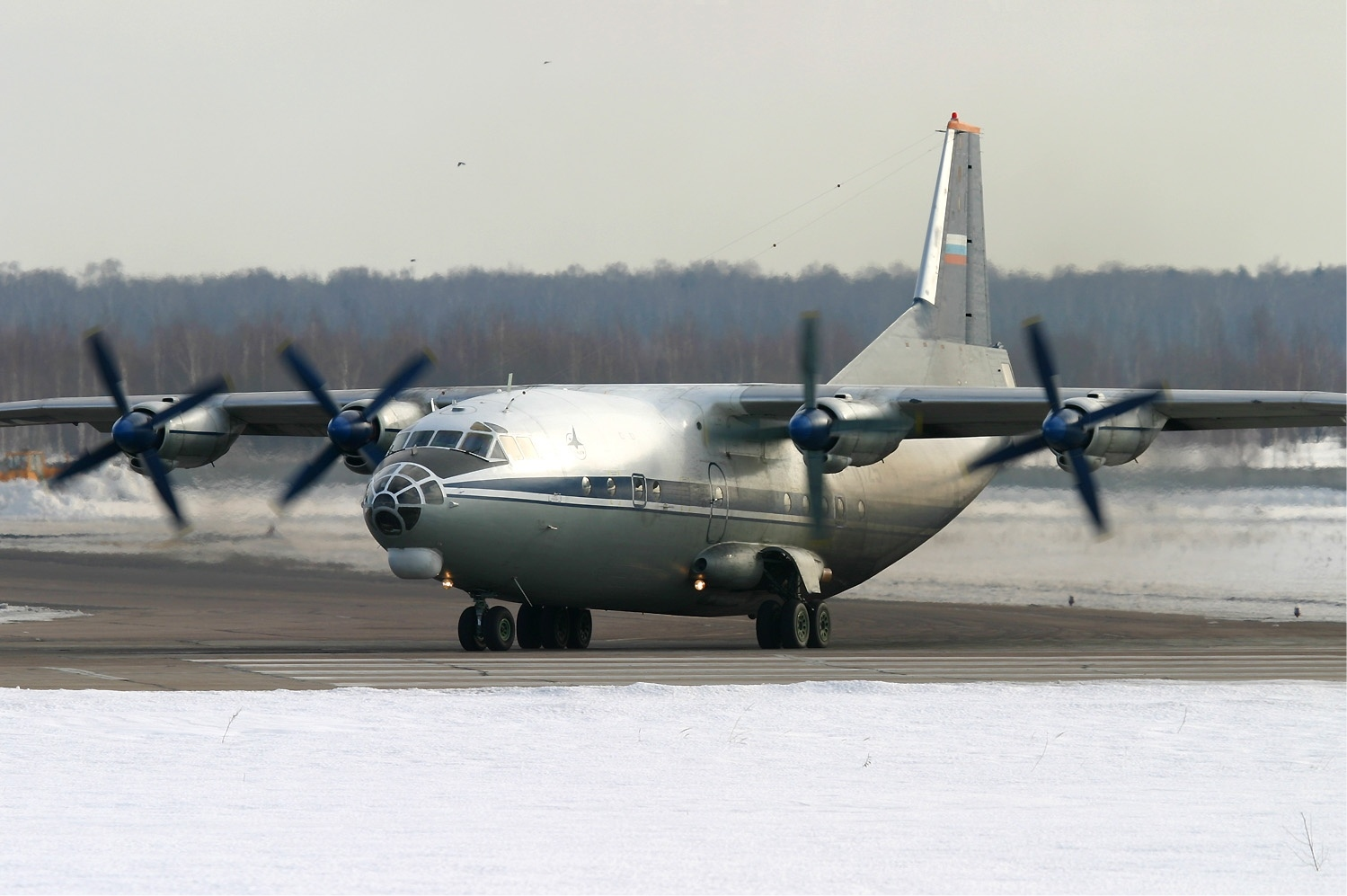
KnAAPO Antonov An-12, Moscow, 2005

Komsomolsk-on-Amur Aircraft Plant (KnAAPO or KnAAZ; Russian: Комсомольский-на-Амуре авиационный завод имени Ю. А. Гагарина); based in Komsomolsk-on-Amur in the Russian Far East, is the largest aircraft-manufacturing company in Russia.

The company is among Khabarovsk Krai's most successful enterprises, and for years has been the largest taxpayer of the territory.

In 1999 and 2001 the Russian Union of Industrialists and Entrepreneurs and the Chamber of Commerce and Industry of RF granted KnAAPO the title "best Russian enterprise".

== Production ==
The company currently produces Su-27SM/SKM fighters, Su-33 and Su-27KUB shipborne fighters, and Be-103 amphibians, among others. In February 2015 the company decided to stop the production of Su-30MK2 multirole fighters to focus on producing the Su-35 and Su-57 stealth multirole fighter aircraft. The assembly line for all versions of the new Sukhoi Superjet 100 is located at the company's facilities. Together with Novosibirsk Aircraft Production Association (which focuses on component production), the company is expected to produce 70 Superjet airframes by 2012.

The plant uses Dzyomgi Airport as a testing and delivery airfield.

== Ownership ==
Shareholders of KnAAPO (JSC):

- United Aircraft Corporation (25.5% of the shares)
- “Sukhoi Company“ JSC (74.5% of the shares)
- KnAAPO (JSC) owns 5.41% of the shares of Sukhoi Design Bureau (JSC)
