= Sukhoi Su-6 =

1941 Soviet attack aircraft

Su-6
- Su-6(S2A) second prototype, two-seater with M-71 engine

General information
- Type: Ground-attack aircraft
- National origin: Soviet Union
- Manufacturer: Sukhoi
- Status: Prototype
- Primary user: Soviet Air Forces
- Number built: 3

History
- First flight: 1 March 1941

The Sukhoi Su-6 was a Soviet ground-attack aircraft developed during World War II. The mixed-power (rocket and piston engines) high-altitude interceptor Su-7 was based on the single-seat Su-6 prototype.

== Design and development ==
Development of the Su-6 began in 1939, when the Sukhoi design bureau began work on a single-seat armoured ground-attack aircraft. An order for two prototypes was placed on 4 March 1940, and on 1 March 1941 flight testing of the first prototype was begun by test pilot A.I. Kokin.

The flight tests indicated that the Su-6 was superior to the Ilyushin Il-2 in nearly all performance categories, however its engine exceeded its age limit before testing could be completed, and no further Shvetsov M-71 engines were available.

The second prototype flew only in January 1942 because the OKB had to be evacuated after the start of the Great Patriotic War. It was armed with two 23 mm cannon, four machine guns and ten rails for aerial rockets. Test results were very favorable, and the AFRA Scientific Research Institute recommended the acquisition of a small production batch for testing under front-line conditions. A draft resolution for the production of 25 aircraft was prepared, however unfortunately for Sukhoi, it was never officially issued.

Meanwhile, combat experience with single-seat Il-2s demonstrated the need for a rear gunner. The third prototype was therefore designed with the second crewman at the expense of bomb load (decreased from 400 kg/881 lb to 200 kg/440 lb), and was fitted with a more powerful M-71F engine. Official tests revealed that the two-seat Su-6 had a 100 km/h (54 kn, 62 mph) greater top speed than the Il-2, although with a considerably smaller payload. When the troublesome M-71 was canceled, Sukhoi was directed to utilize the liquid-cooled Mikulin AM-42 engine. When flight tests began on 22 February 1944, the re-engined Su-6 proved inferior to the Ilyushin Il-10 using the same engine thanks to the additional 250 kg (551 lb) of armor required to protect the liquid-cooled engine and the lower power output of the AM-42 compared with M-71F.

Although the Su-6 never entered production, in 1943 Pavel Sukhoi was awarded the Stalin Prize of the 1st Degree for the development of the aircraft.

=== Su-7 ===
As an experiment, the basic single-seat Su-6 design was converted into a mixed-power high-altitude interceptor named Su-7 (the name was reused in the 1950s for a supersonic fighter-bomber). The armor was removed and the fuselage was of all-metal construction. Power came from a Shvetsov ASh-82FN piston engine with two TK-3 turbochargers in the nose and a Glushko RD-1-KhZ rocket engine in the tail. The piston engine produced 1,380 kW (1,850 hp), while the rocket engine utilized kerosene and nitric acid for fuel and generated 2.9 kN (600 lbf) of thrust for up to 4 minutes. Armament consisted of three 20 mm ShVAK cannon with 370 rounds of ammunition. The sole Su-7 was completed in 1944. Test flights demonstrated a top speed of 510 km/h (275 kn, 315 mph) at 12,000 m (39,370 ft) without the rocket motor, and 705 km/h (380 kn, 440 mph) with the rocket. In 1945, the rocket motor exploded during flight testing, killing the pilot and destroying the aircraft.

== Variants ==
A
The initial design for the Su-6.
S
The second prototype with various modifications.
SA (modified)
The SA with 2 x OKB-16 37 mm (1.46 in) Cannon and 2x 7.62 mm (0.30 in) ShKAS machine guns.
S2A
The Su-6 fitted with a second cockpit with a rear-firing 12.7 mm (0.50 in) Berezin UBT machine gun. Testing revealed better performance and armour than the Il-2, but despite recommendations, production was not carried out due to the M-71 engine not entering production.

== Operators ==
Soviet Union

- Soviet Air Force

== Specifications (Su-6(SA) 2nd prototype) ==
Data from OKB Sukhoi,

General characteristics

- Crew: 1
- Length: 9.243 m (30 ft 4 in)
- Wingspan: 13.58 m (44 ft 7 in)
- Height: 3.89 m (12 ft 9 in) (S2A)
- Wing area: 26 m^{2} (280 sq ft)
- Airfoil: root:TsAGI B (18%); tip: TsAGI B (8%)
- Empty weight: 3,727 kg (8,217 lb) (SA)

(S2A) 4,000 kg (8,800 lb)

- Gross weight: 5,534 kg (12,200 lb) (S2A)
- Fuel capacity: 480 kg (1,060 lb)
- Powerplant: 1 × Shvetsov M-71 18-cylinder two-row air-cooled radial piston engine, 1,500 kW (2,000 hp)

(S2A) 1x 1,600 kW (2,200 hp) Shvetsov M-71F

- Propellers: 4-bladed AV-54A, 3.25 m (10 ft 8 in) diameter constant-speed propeller

Performance

- Maximum speed: 496 km/h (308 mph, 268 kn) at sea level with 10x RS-132 rockets

510 km/h (320 mph; 280 kn) at sea level without warload
491 km/h (305 mph; 265 kn) at 2,500 m (8,200 ft) with bombs
527 km/h (327 mph; 285 kn) at 2,500 m (8,200 ft) without bombs

(S2A) 514 km/h (319 mph; 278 kn) at 3,800 m (12,500 ft)

- Landing speed: 136 km/h (85 mph; 73 kn)
- Take-off speed: 160 km/h (99 mph; 86 kn)
- Range: 450 km (280 mi, 240 nmi)
- Ferry range: 576 km (358 mi, 311 nmi)

(S2A) 973 km (605 mi; 525 nmi)

- Service ceiling: 8,100 m (26,600 ft) (S2A)
- Time to altitude: (S2A)1,555 m (5,102 ft) in 10 minutes 36 seconds
- Take-off run: 520 m (1,710 ft)
  - Take-off roll (S2A): 410 m (1,350 ft)
  - Landing roll (S2A): 730 m (2,400 ft)

Armament

- Guns:
  - 2 × 37 mm (1.46 in) Nudelman-Suranov NS-37 autocannon in the wings (90 rounds per gun, 180 rounds total)
  - 2 × 7.62 mm (0.30 in) ShKAS machine guns in the wings (1,400 rounds per gun, 2,800 rounds total)
  - 1 × 12.7 mm (0.50 in) Berezin UBT machine gun in rear turret with 196 rounds
- Rockets: 10x RS-132 rockets
- Bombs: Up to 400 kg (880 lb) of bombs

== See also ==
Aircraft of comparable role, configuration, and era

- Ilyushin Il-2
- Ilyushin Il-10
- Sukhoi Su-2

Related lists

- List of military aircraft of the Soviet Union and the CIS
