= 2013 Irkut-Avia An-12 crash =

2013 aviation accident in Russia

2013 Irkut-Avia Antonov An-12 crash
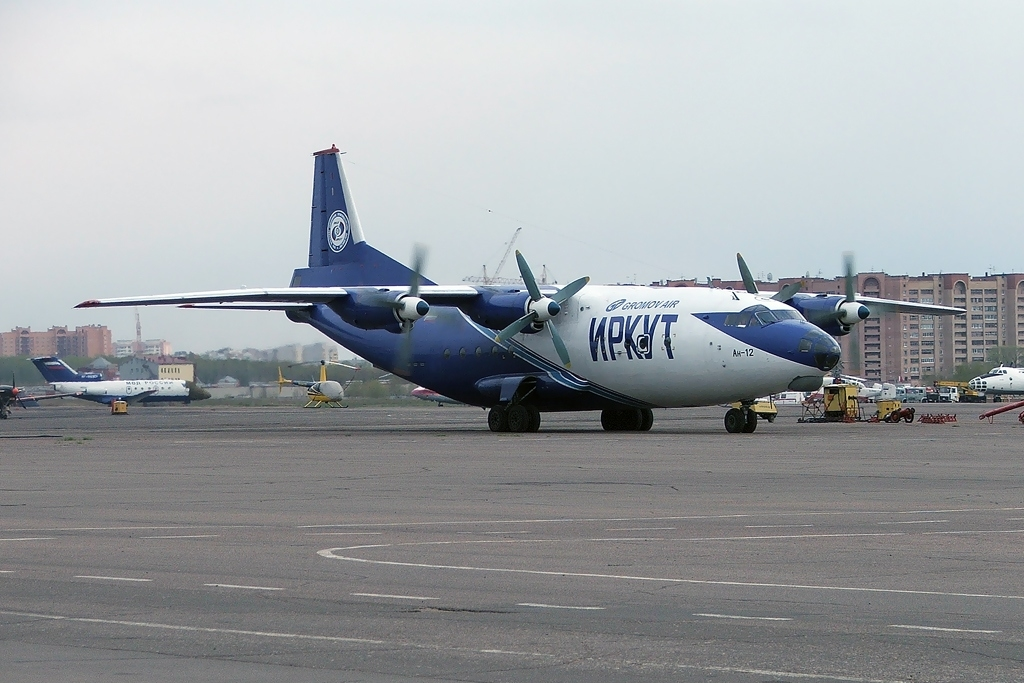
- 12162, the aircraft involved in the accident

Accident
- Date: 26 December 2013
- Summary: Crashed on approach due to pilot error
- Site: Near Irkutsk Northwest Airport, Irkutsk, Russia; 52°23′24.4″N 104°08′56.9″E

Aircraft
- Aircraft type: Antonov An-12
- Operator: Irkut-Avia
- Registration: 12162
- Flight origin: Yeltsovka Airport, Novosibirsk, Russia
- Destination: Irkutsk Northwest Airport, Irkutsk, Russia
- Occupants: 9
- Passengers: 3
- Crew: 6
- Fatalities: 9
- Injuries: 0
- Survivors: 0

On 26 December 2013, an Irkut-Avia Antonov An-12 operating a domestic cargo flight in Russia from Yeltsovka Airport, Novosibirsk, crashed on approach to its destination, Irkutsk Northwest Airport, Irkutsk. All nine people on board, six crew members and three passengers, were killed in the accident. The accident has been found to have been caused mainly by pilot error, even though later inquiries suggested that a failure of the engine number two might have been the main factor that led to the crash.

== Background ==
=== Aircraft ===
The aircraft involved was a cargo Antonov An-12 registered as RA-12162. The aircraft was manufactured in 1963, with serial number 3341509, and it was initially delivered to the Soviet Air Force, Irkut-Avia acquired the aircraft in 2008.

=== Crew and passengers ===
On board the aircraft there were six crew members and three passengers.

The crew of the An-12 consisted of 50 years old captain Valery V. Shargorodsky, 53 years old first officer Pavel P. Erofeev, 51 years old navigator Sergei V. Abrasimov, 51 years old flight engineer Seitzhan M. Makhmutov, 46 years old radio operator Pavel I. Sebekin and 29 years old Alexander S. Levakovsky.

The three passengers were 46 years old Oleg Vladimirovich Trunin, 45 years old Igor Leonidovich Fursov and 55 years old Alexander L. Yakovlev, they were all technicians.

== Flight ==
The Antonov An-12 was scheduled to perform a cargo flight between Yeltsovka Airport and Irkutsk Northwest Airport, to transport freight between the factories of the Irkut Corporation in the cities of Novosibirsk and Irkutsk. The aircraft was carrying six crew members, three passengers and 1.5 tons of spare parts. The first part of the flight went uneventful, then when on approach the aircraft lined up with runway 14 at Irkutsk Northwest Airport. At 9:01 pm local time the Irkutsk air traffic control centre lost contact with the plane, which was about 1.7 km before the runway. The aircraft impacted some birch trees with its landing gear and belly, before crashing into an hangar belonging to the Russian Ministry of Defence and catching fire. Multiple replacement tools and ZIL-131 veichles that were inside the hangars or on the ground were destroyed. 37 minutes after the crash the Russian Ministry of Emergency Situations received reports of the accident. Ten fire engines and numerous firefighters reached the crash scene soon after the accident; the cost of the damage was estimated to be over 78 million rubles.

== Investigation ==
The investigation on the crash found out that pilot error was the main cause of the crash, with weather at the time, which was snowy and with a poor visibility, and air traffic control errors cited as contributory causes.

A legal procedure was initiated, pursuant to part 3 of article 263 of the Criminal Code of Russia, for the "violation of norms regarding air safety". During the procedure the directors of the testers' division of Irkut-Avia, Andrei Starkov and Aleksandr Oseiko, have been sentenced to three years in a penal colony.

In 2016 a judicial investigation ruled that the malfunction of the number two engine of the Antonov An-12 was one of the main causes of the crash, at the same level as pilot error. The position of the propellers of the engine number two at the crash site, which was only possible in case of a malfunction, was cited as the main probe during this investigation.
