= Tupolev ANT-43 =

ANT-43

General information
- Type: Prototype passenger/liaison aircraft
- National origin: Soviet Union
- Manufacturer: Tupolev
- Number built: 1

History
- First flight: never flown
- Developed from: Tupolev ANT-31

The Tupolev ANT-43 was an experimental passenger aircraft designed and built by the Tupolev Design Bureau in the 1930s, for purposes of gaining practical experience with the so-called "placemeter" production method.

== Design and development ==
The ANT-43 was a seven-passenger, low-wing monoplane design of all-metal construction, bearing resemblance to the Tupolev ANT-31 (I-14) fighter. Intended as an HQ liaison aircraft, it was conceived using a stencil-based template design method rather than project drawings, and construction of the prototype was undertaken 1935–1936; it was this design method that proved to be the project's undoing. Due to concerns about weaknesses in the ANT-43's airframe construction, when the ANT-43 prototype was completed, TsAGI summoned a commission led by Viktor N. Belyayev to decide whether the ANT-43 was fit for flight testing. The commission, deciding that the ANT-43 prototype did not meet structural strength norms, refused to approve flight tests for the aircraft, and the ANT-43 was scrapped without ever being flown.

== Specifications ==
Data from OKB Tupolev

General characteristics

- Crew: 1
- Capacity: 6 passengers
- Powerplant: 1 × Gnome et Rhône 14Rsd 14-cylinder air-cooled radial piston engine, 600 kW (800 hp)
