= Irkutsk Northwest Airport =

Irkutsk Northwest
- IATA: none; ICAO: UIIR

Summary
- Airport type: Public
- Location: Irkutsk
- Elevation AMSL: 1,470 ft (450 m)
- Coordinates: 52°22′6″N 104°11′0″E
- Interactive map of Irkutsk Northwest

Runways
Direction	Length		Surface
Direction	ft	m	Surface
14/32	8,202	2,500	Concrete

Irkutsk Northwest Airport is an airport in Russia located 11 km northwest of Irkutsk. It is a flyaway airfield for the Irkutsk Aviation Plant, and has no parallel taxiways. It is also known as Irkutsk II airport, and occasionally serves as a diversion airport for the main Irkutsk International Airport

No one had forgot this accident in Irkutsk International Airport back in 2013. The 2013 Irkut-Avia Antonov An-12 crash was an accident caused a factor of pilot errors. The plane was on approach to the airport but the pilot made an error causing it to crash. The pilots tried to go around but failed. All 9 crew members died in the crash in 2013.

== History ==
In 1932, the factory Irkutsk Aircraft Plant Stalin 125 was built here, and was expanded in 1941 during World War II. By the 1960s, it was known as Irkutsk Airframe Plant 39 and observed by Western satellites in August 1962. It produced the Ilyushin Il-28 Beagle, the Antonov An-12 Cub, the Yakovlev Yak-28 Brewer, and the Antonov An-24 Coke. By the late 1970s the factory was involved in the production of the MiG-23U (Flogger C) and ground attack MiG-23B (Flogger D/F), and produced components for the Tupolev Tu-22M Backfire bomber. The factory is now known as the Irkutsk Aviation Plant.

== Accidents and incidents ==
- On 6 December 1997, a Russian Air Force Antonov An-124-100 en route to Cam Ranh Air Base in Vietnam, crashed in a residential area shortly after takeoff.
- On 26 December 2013, an Irkut-Avia Antonov An-12 operating a domestic cargo flight in Russia from Yeltsovka Airport, Novosibirsk, crashed on approach to the airport. All nine people on board, six crew members and three passengers, were killed in the accident. The accident has been found to have been caused mainly by pilot error, even though later inquiries suggested that a failure of the engine number two might have been the main factor that led to the crash.
