= I14 =

I14 or I-14 may refer to:

- Interstate 14, a highway in the U.S. state of Texas
- I14 engine, a type of fourteen-cylinder internal combustion engine
- International 14, a high-performance sailing dinghy
- Hälsinge Regiment, a Swedish Army infantry regiment
- Japanese submarine I-14, a submarine of the Imperial Japanese Navy
- Tupolev I-14, Soviet aircraft
