= Irkutsk Aviation Plant =

Russian aircraft manufacturer

Coordinates: 52°21′10″N 104°12′34″E

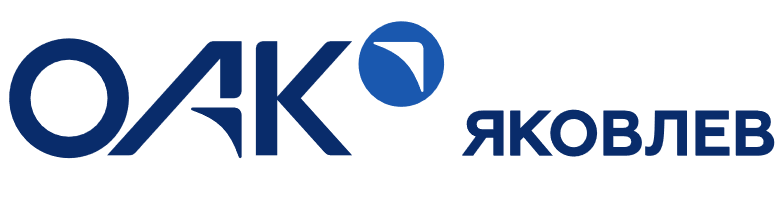

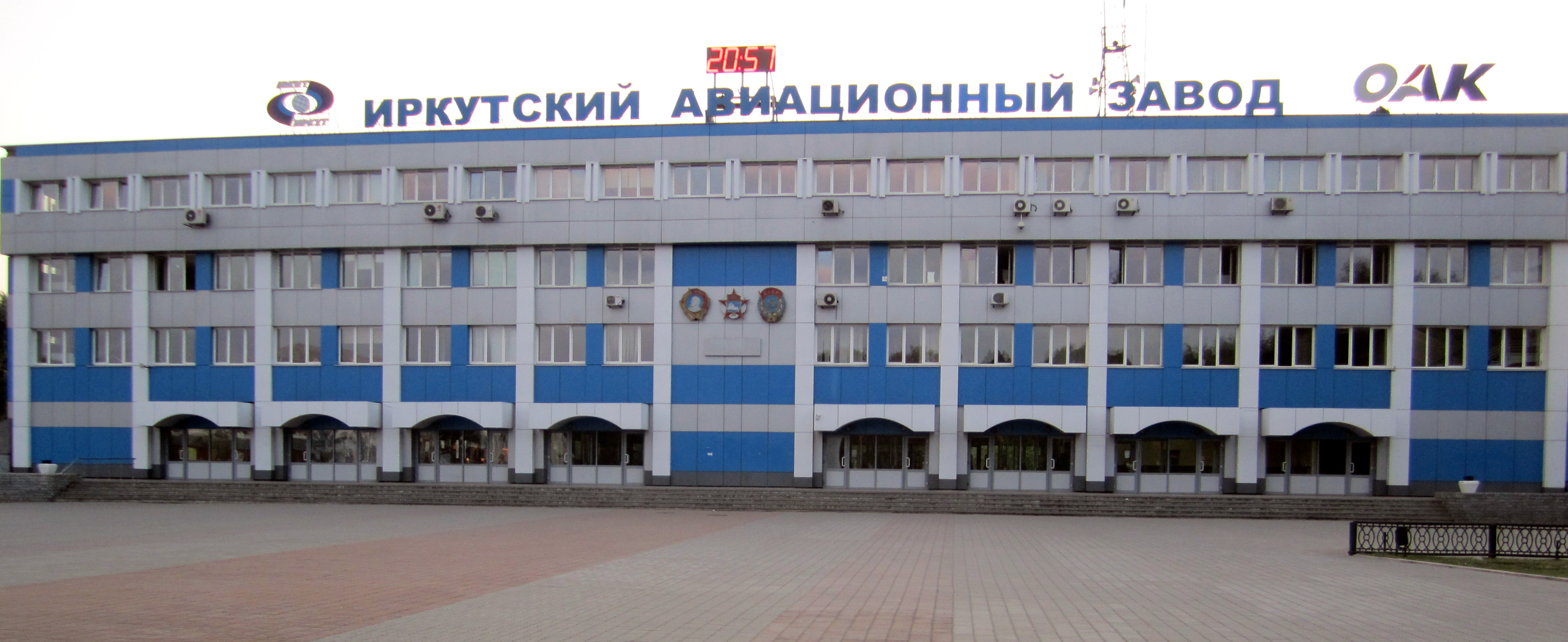
- Native name: Иркутский авиационный завод
- Type: Open joint-stock company
- Industry: Aerospace
- Founded: March 28, 1932; 94 years ago
- Founder: People's Commissariat of Heavy Industry
- Headquarters: Irkutsk Northwest Airport, Irkutsk, Russia
- Products: Sukhoi Su-30; Yakovlev Yak-130; Yakovlev MC-21
- Owner: United Aircraft Corporation
- Parent: JSC Yakovlev Corporation
- Website: https://eng.yakovlev.ru/

The Irkutsk Aviation Plant (Russian: Иркутский авиационный завод) is an aircraft manufacturing company based in Irkutsk, Russia. The company is a subsidiary of Yakovlev Corporation and produces a number of civilian and military aircraft, including the Sukhoi Su-30 multirole fighter, Yakovlev Yak-130 trainer and Yakovlev MC-21 airliner.

Since its establishment in 1932, the plant has produced over 8,000 aircraft. The plant is based at Irkutsk Northwest Airport, located along the Angara River.

== History ==
=== 1932–1941: early years ===
On 28 March 1932, the People's Commissariat of Heavy Industry issued order No. 181 for the construction of "Plant No. 125 named after Joseph Stalin" in Irkutsk. Construction was carried out in difficult conditions and in strict secrecy, primarily through manual labour from the Komsomol. From July 1932, a large number of construction workers were sent by the Komsomol Central Committee from around the Soviet Union.

By 1934, the first facilities at the plant had been completed, with production readying for the manufacture of the Tupolev I-14 fighter. In February 1935 the first I-14 built at the plant took to the skies, six months after the opening of the plant. Later in 1936, production of the Tupolev SB fast bomber began.

=== 1941–1945: the Great Patriotic War ===
The Red Army Air Force was devastated in the aftermath of Operation Barbarossa. As the Irkutsk plant was safely located east of the Ural Mountains, the plant bore a significant responsibility for the restoration of the countries air fleet. In late 1941, the plant was merged with the evacuated Moscow Aviation Plant No. 39, inheriting its plant number. 144 Petlyakov Pe-2 dive bombers had been built by the end of 1941, to be shipped to the frontline via the Trans-Siberian Railway. By 1942, the plant had reached a peak of five aircraft produced per day. Following the Pe-2, several additional bomber aircraft would also be built.

In total, more than two thousand aircraft were produced during the war years, including:

- 730 Petlyakov Pe-2
- 134 Petlyakov Pe-3
- 919 Ilyushin Il-4
- 391 Yermolayev Yer-2 and 4 Yer-2ON

The production of several aircraft, including the Yer-2 and Tu-2 medium bombers would continue for several years after the war.

=== 1945–1991: jet age ===
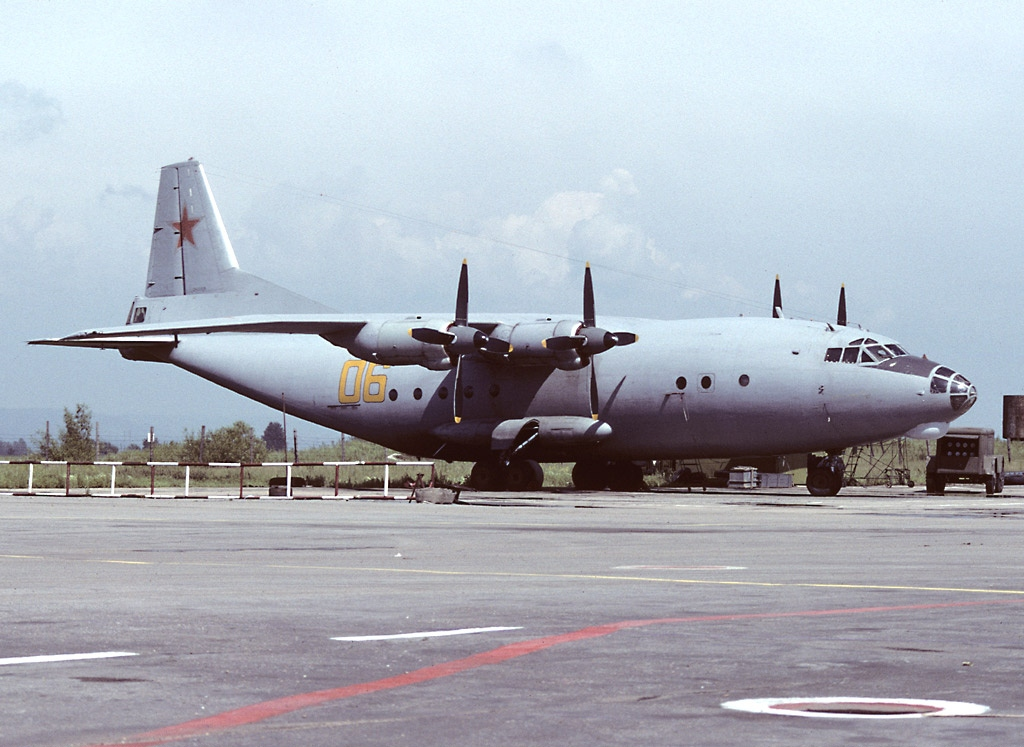
Antonov An-12

The 1950s saw the beginning of the jet age at Irkutsk, with the construction of Tupolev Tu-14 and Ilyushin Il-28 jet bombers. The latter would become the backbone of Warsaw Pact frontal aviation in the early jet era. At the same time the plant began producing a large number of consumer goods, such as backpacks, cutlery, lamps and toys. In 1957, the plant was overhauled to allow for production of the new Antonov An-12 tactical airlift aircraft, the largest aircraft built to date. The first prototype aircraft flew from Irkutsk-2 on 16 December 1957. From 1956 to 1962, 155 aircraft were assembled at the plant, before being moved to Tashkent to free up production space. The production of military transport aircraft would continue in 1967 with the production of the Antonov An-24T.

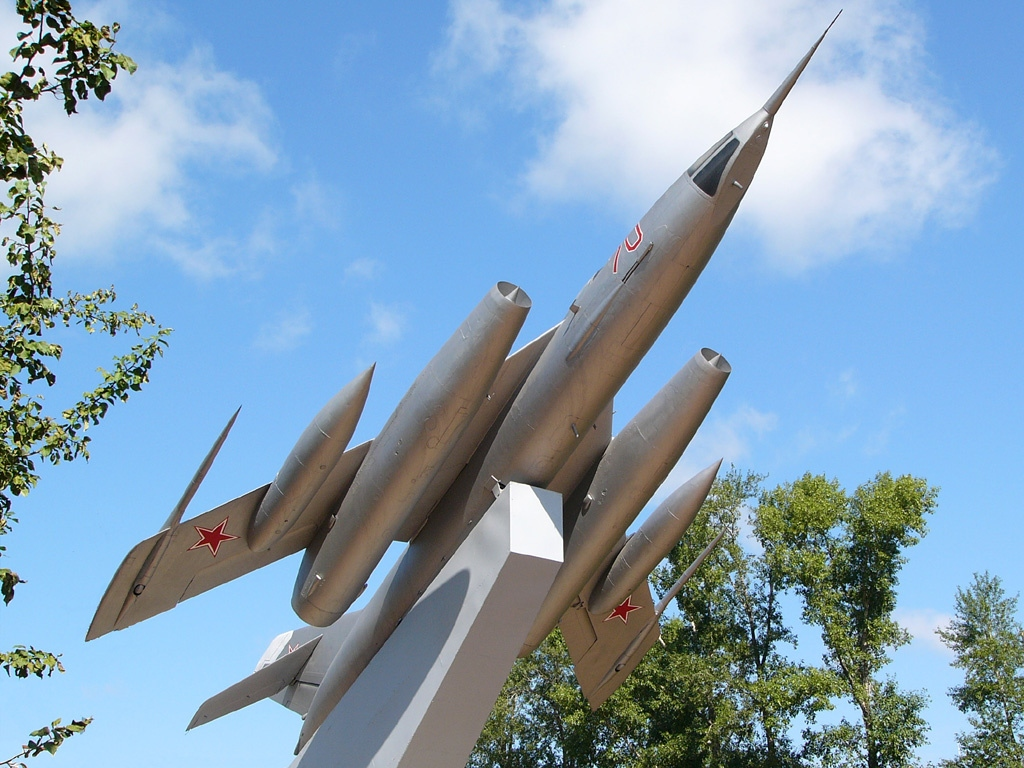
Yak-28

From 1960 to 1972, the plant produced 697 airframes of the Yakovlev Yak-28 combat aircraft. While initially conceived as a medium bomber, variants for reconnaissance, electronic warfare, interceptor and trainer use were built. In August 1982, a Yak-28 was installed as a gate guardian at the front of the complex to coincide with its 50th anniversary.

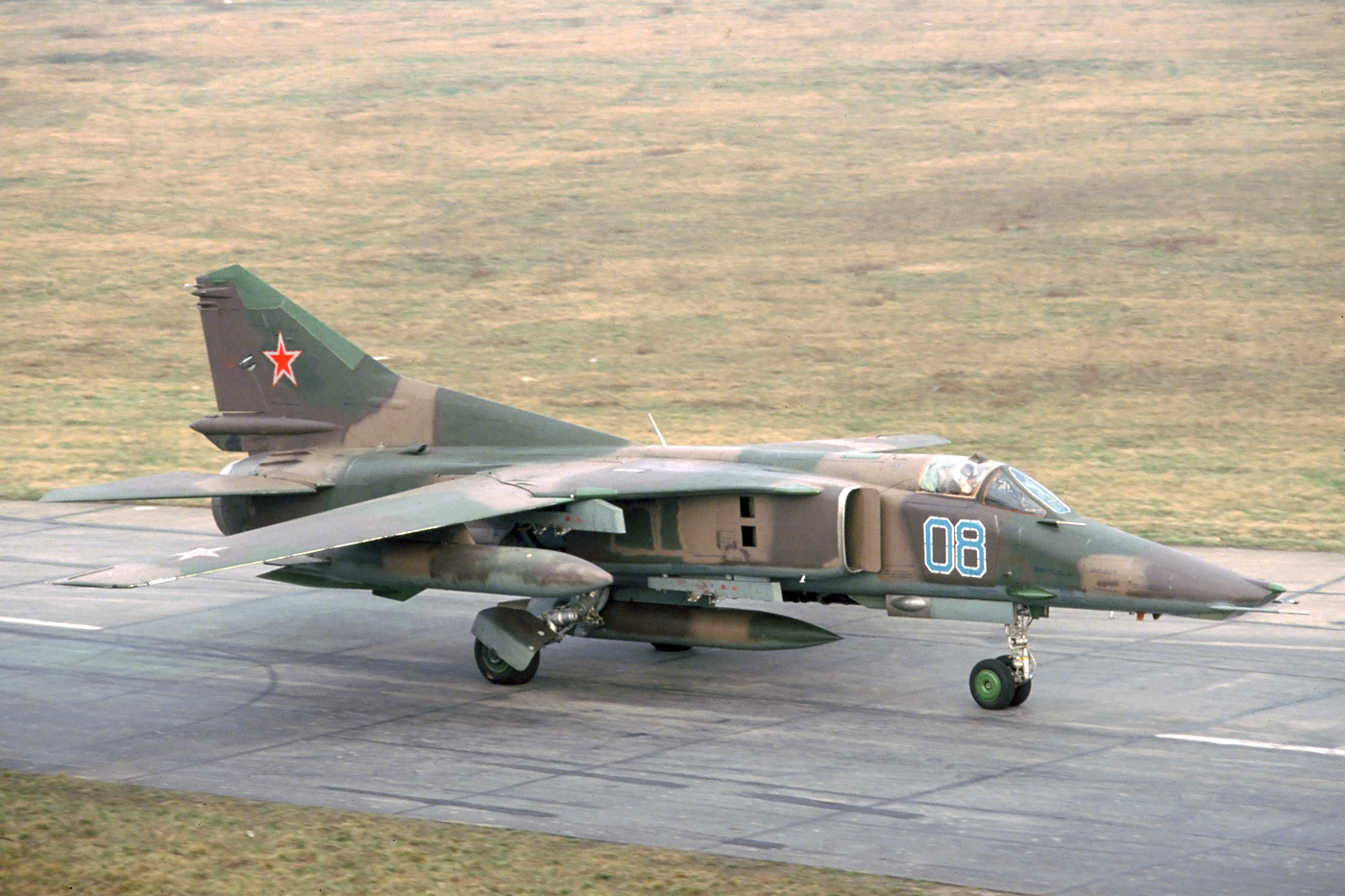
MiG-27K

In the early 1970s, the variable-geometry Mikoyan-Gurevich MiG-23 was produced at Irkutsk. In particular, production of the twin-seat training variant MiG-23U began in 1971, eventually converted to the MiG-23UB. From 1977 to 1988, the ground attack variant MiG-27 would also be produced, including the MiG-27K equipped with highly advanced navigation-attack system. Both MiG-23 and MiG-27 aircraft were successfully exported to several countries, as well as licensed production carried out in cooperation with Hindustan Aeronautics Limited (HAL) in India. In total 1,008 MiG-23 and 360 MiG-27 were assembled in Irkutsk.

In the mid-1980s, the production of the two-seater Su-27UB was transferred to Irkutsk. While the original Su-27 had good range, it still did not have enough range for the Soviet Air Defence Forces. Hence, development began in 1986 on the Su-27PU, an improved-capability variant of the Su-27UB capable of serving as a long-range interceptor or airborne command post. The first Su-27PU flew at Irkutsk on 31 December 1989, and the first of three pre-production models flew on 14 April 1992, amidst the turmoil surrounding the Dissolution of the Soviet Union.

=== 1991–2006: time of troubles ===
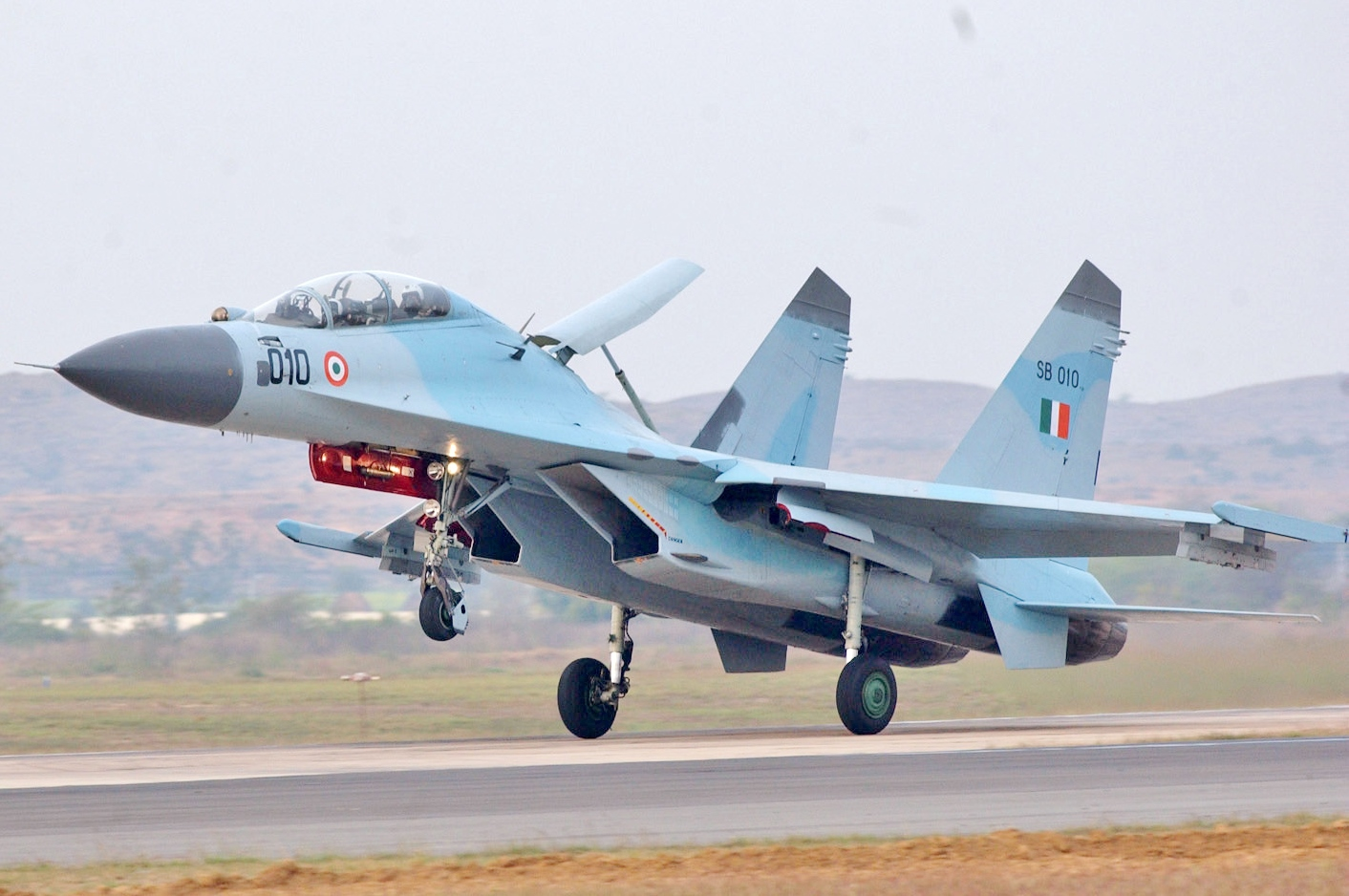
Su-30MKI

On 21 April 1989, the plant was reorganised into the Irkutsk Aviation Production Association (IAPO), before being privatised in 1992, led by Alexey Innokentievich Federov. IAPO was on the brink of collapse in the chaotic post-Soviet 1990s. The fall of the Soviet Union evaporated the state military budget, resulting in the Russian aerospace industry facing layoffs, frozen wages and closure. The now cash-strapped Russian government had no money to fulfil outstanding orders from the Soviet era.

A critical cash-injection was provided by a deal between Russia and India to procure a large number of Sukhoi Su-30MKI aircraft, an updated variant based on the earlier Su-27PU for the Indian Air Force. Initial batches would be produced by IAPO, while licensed production will be established by Hindustan Aeronautics Limited.

== Products ==
Aircraft produced by Irkutsk Aviation Plant
Aircraft	Type	Production start	Production end	Notes
I-14	Fighter	1935	1937	
SB	Fast bomber	1936	1940	
Pe-2	Dive bomber	1941	1943	
Pe-3	Heavy fighter	1942	1943	
Il-4	Long-range bomber	1942	1944	
Il-6	Long-range bomber	1943	1944	Further development halted in 1944
Yer-2	Medium bomber	1944	1946	
Tu-2	Medium bomber	1947	1950	
Tu-14	Torpedo bomber	1948	1953	
Il-28	Medium bomber	1953	1953	
An-12	Tactical airlifter	1956	1962	An-12T variant
Yak-28	Medium bomber	1960	1972	
An-24	Tactical airlifter	1967	1971	
MiG-23	Fighter	1970	1985	U, UB, UM variant
MiG-27	Attack	1977	1983	
Su-27	Fighter	1986	2002	UB variant
Be-200	Amphibious aircraft	1992	2011	Production transferred to Taganrog Aviation Plant
Su-30	Multirole	1992		Su-30K, Su-30MK since 1997, Su-30SM since 2012, Su-30SM2 since 2025
Yak-130	Lead-in fighter trainer	2008		
MC-21	Airliner	2014		First flight took place on May 28, 2017

The plant's products are supplied to 37 countries of the world: Vietnam, India, Bangladesh, China, Afghanistan, Egypt and others.

== Directors ==
- 1932 - Lyushinsky Alexander Danilovich
- 1932-1935 - Iryanov Vladimir Grigoryevich
- 1935-1936 - Makar Yevsey Grigorievich
- 1936-1937 - Gorelits Abram Grigorievich
- 1938-1940 - Levin Israel Solomonovich
- 1940-1942 - Iosilovich Isaac Borisovich
- 1942-1946 - Abramov Viktor Ivanovich
- 1946-1947 - Petrov Kirill Alexandrovich
- 1948-1952 - Semenov Mikhail Pavlovich
- 1953-1960 - Ivanchenko Sergey Kuzmich
- 1960-1968 - Khlopotunov Anatoly Sergeevich
- 1968-1979 - Maksimovsky Viktor Afanasievich
- 1980-1993 - Gorbunov Gennady Nikolaevich
- 1993-1997 - Fedorov Alexey Innokentievich
- 1997-2008 Kovalkov Vladimir Vasilyevich
- from 2008 - Veprev Alexander Alekseevich
