= 1997 Irkutsk An-124 crash =

Aviation accident in Russia

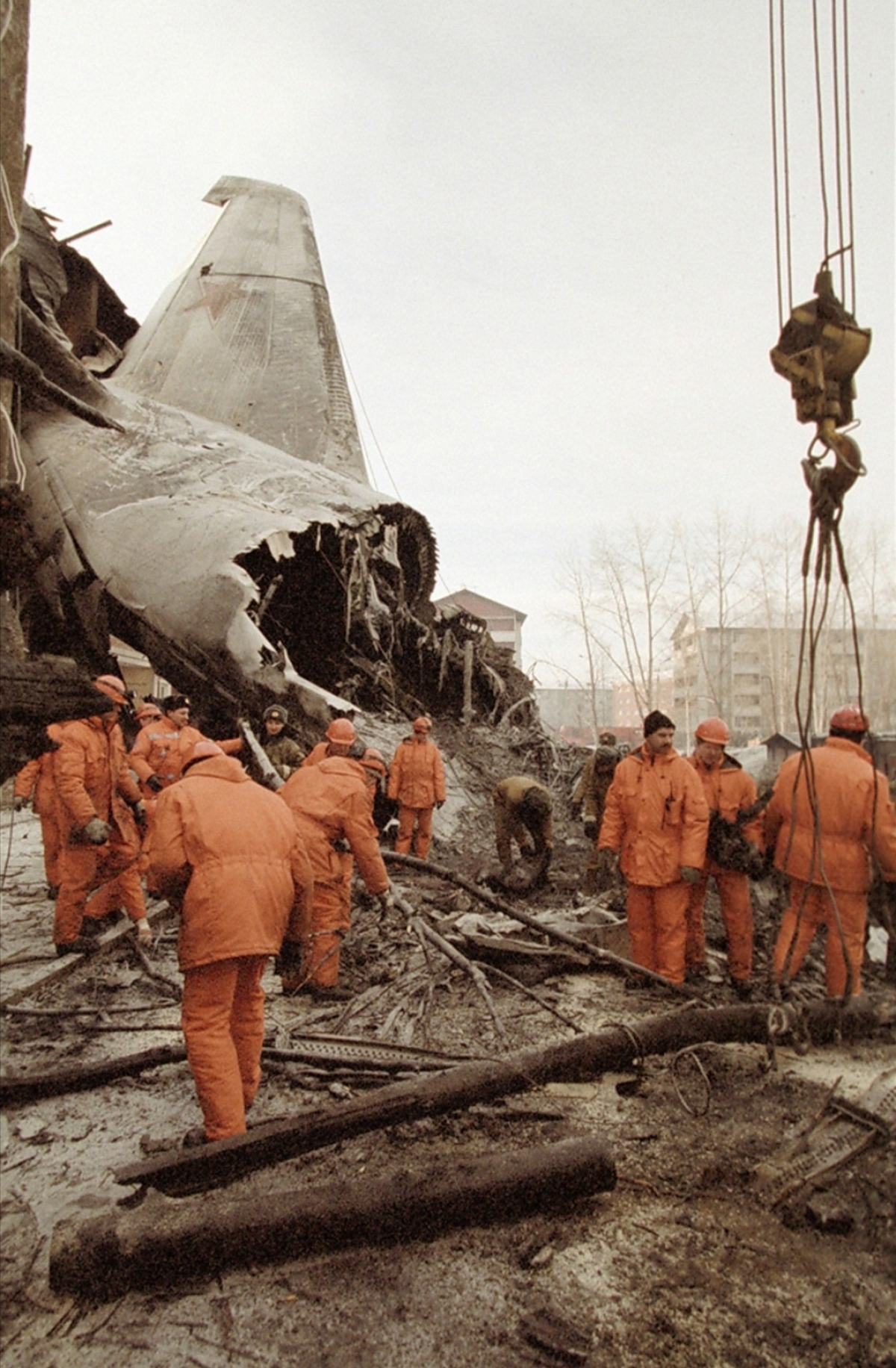
- Wreckage of RA-82005 at the crash site

Accident
- Date: 6 December 1997
- Summary: Multiple engine failure on climb-out
- Site: Mira Street, near Irkutsk Northwest Airport, Irkutsk, Russia; 52°21′2″N 104°12′48″E
- Total fatalities: 72

Aircraft
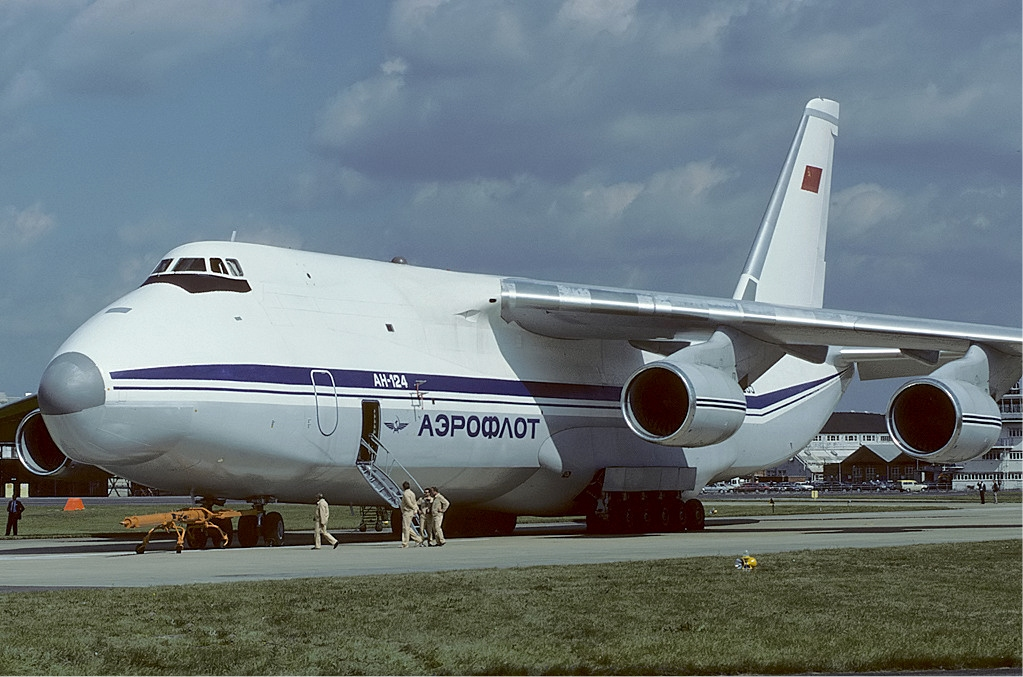
- The aircraft involved in the accident, while in an Aeroflot livery in 1986
- Aircraft type: Antonov An-124-100
- Operator: Russian Air Force
- Registration: "08" black
- Flight origin: Irkutsk Northwest Airport
- Stopover: Vladivostok International Airport
- Destination: Cam Ranh Air Base, Cam Ranh Bay, Vietnam
- Occupants: 23
- Passengers: 15
- Crew: 8
- Fatalities: 23
- Survivors: 0

Ground casualties
- Ground fatalities: 49

On 6 December 1997, a Russian Air Force Antonov An-124-100, en route from Irkutsk Northwest Airport to Cam Ranh Air Base in Vietnam, crashed in a residential area after takeoff from the airport.

Leased by Ukrainian Cargo Airways, the aircraft was carrying two Sukhoi Su-27UBK fighters (8524 and 8525) for delivery to the Vietnam People's Air Force, with a planned stopover at Vladivostok.

Three seconds after lift-off from Runway 14 at Irkutsk, the No.3 engine surged at approximately 5 metres (16 ft) altitude. The aircraft continued to climb, but at a high angle of attack, disrupting airflow to No.1 and No.2 engines which also surged.

Unable to continue climbing the aircraft descended until it struck houses in Mira Street, 1,600 metres (5,200 ft; 1,700 yd) beyond the runway end, killing all 23 on board and 49 persons on the ground.

== Aircraft ==
The Antonov An-124-100 aircraft that crashed was first leased by Aeroflot in 1985 with her maiden flight on 30 October 1985. On 14 February 1988, ownership was transferred to the Soviet Air Forces, under the 566th Military Transport Aviation Regiment, 12th Military Transport Aviation Division "Crazy Russian Girls" based in Seshcha, Bryansk Oblast airbase, with a tail number of CCCP-82005 (RA-82005). On the day of the accident the Antonov had accumulated 576 takeoff/landing cycles for the Russian Air Force and had flown over 1,034 hours.

== Accident ==
On 6 December 1997, RA-82005 was transporting two Su-27UBK fighters with a total weight of 40 tons to Vietnam.

At 14:42 IKT aircraft took off from Irkutsk. However, just three seconds after lift-off from the runway at a height of 5 metres (16 ft), there was a surge in engine number 3 which caused an increase of the angular velocity of the Antonov. This resulted in a shutdown of engine number 2. Eight seconds after takeoff at the altitude of 66 metres (217 ft), following a surge in engine number 1, the aircraft began losing altitude.

Although the pilots had tried to maintain control over the aircraft with a single remaining functioning engine, the aircraft crashed into apartment block number 45 on Grazhdanskaya Street. The tail section of the Antonov significantly damaged block number 120 and a neighboring orphanage.

== Aftermath ==
The crash resulted in the deaths of all of the crew on board the aircraft as well as 49 people on the ground (including 12 children from the orphanage). More than 70 families were left homeless due to the damage dealt on the two blocks by the crashed aircraft. The damage was aggravated by the ignition of tons of aviation fuel leaked during the crash.

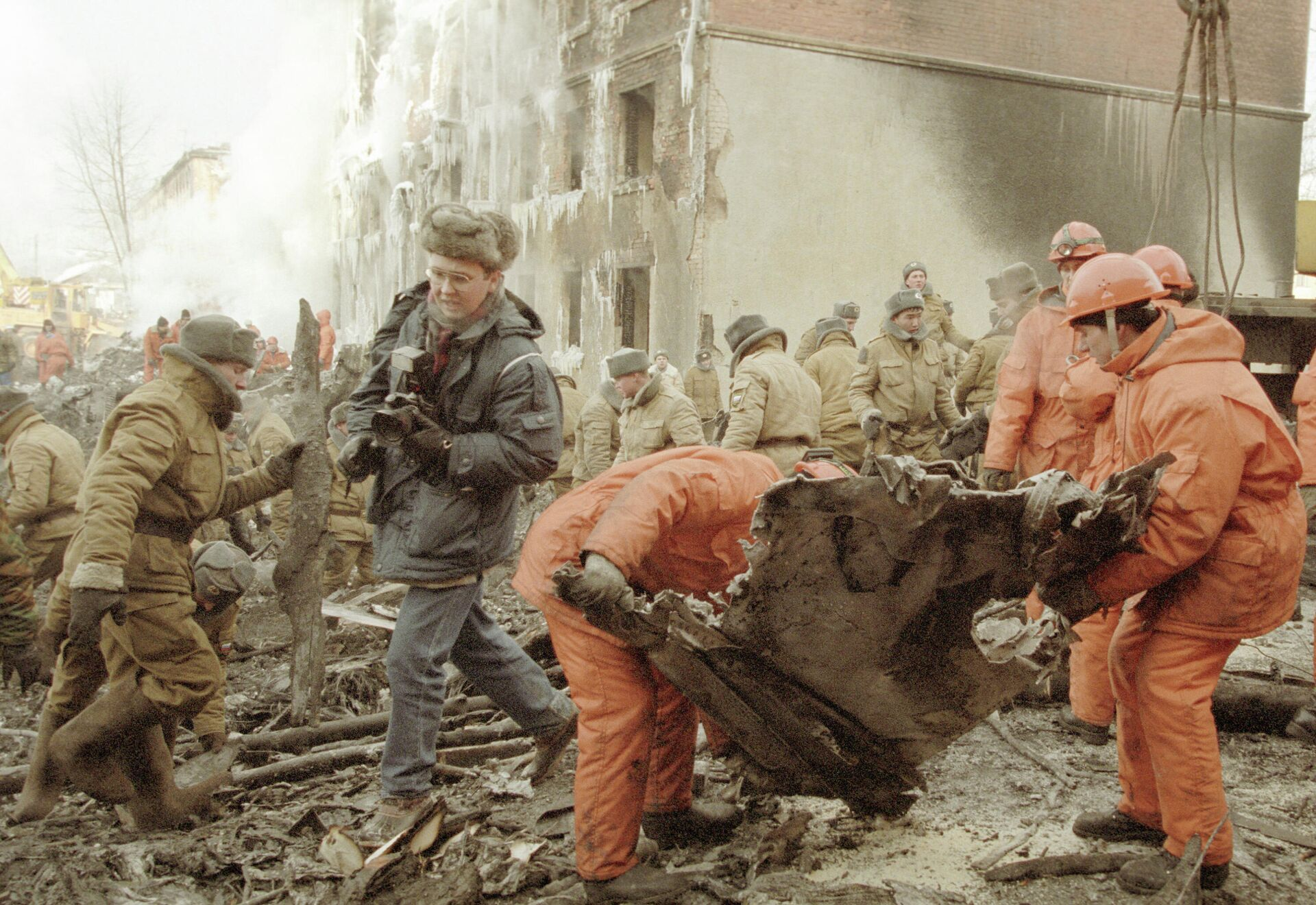
Workers amongst the wreckage

== Investigation ==
A special commission was established to investigate the causes of the disaster.

The two flight recorders, including the cockpit voice recorder, were in the center of the fire and were too badly damaged to provide meaningful data. The cause of failure of the three engines was never fully confirmed and the final conclusion of the commission has not been made public.

However, temperatures in Irkutsk were below −20 °C (−4 °F) and it was theorized that the disaster was caused by mixing cold-weather fuel with regular fuel, which was present in the tanks of An-124 after previous flight from Vietnam. That mix would have produced ice crystals which would clog the fuel filters, which would cut the fuel flow to the engines.

In an interview with the Moskovsky Komsomolets newspaper, the test pilot Alexander Akimenkov said that the accident could have been caused by the call of a passenger with the Chinese radiotelephone, which affected how the electronics work.

Major General Boris Tumanov, former Chief of the Russian Air Force Flight Safety Service (1993–2002) and a member of the Commission of Inquiry into Air Accidents with military aircraft, told the Moskovsky Komsomolets that the accident was caused by failure of three engines as a result of the surge.

In 2009, Fedor Muravchenko, General Designer of Ivchenko-Progress Design Bureau (which is the developer of aircraft engines for the An-124), gave his own version of the causes of the disaster. Based on the results of this enterprise research and experiments and his own theoretical calculations, he concluded that the disaster situation was caused by high (in excess of standard) water content in the aviation fuel (kerosene) that resulted in the ice formation and clogging the fuel filters, causing the engines to surge.

== See also ==
- 2022 Yeysk military aircraft crash - another Russian military aircraft that crashed into a residential area.
- List of aircraft accidents and incidents by number of ground fatalities
- Turkish Airlines Flight 6491 – another crash with many fatalities on the ground.

== Bibliography ==
- Haine, Edgar A. (2000). Disaster in the Air. Associated University Presses. p. 43. ISBN 9780845347775.
