= United Aircraft Corporation =

Subsidiary of Rostec

PJSC United Aircraft Corporation
- Native name: Russian: ПАО Объединённая Авиастроительная Корпорация
- Formerly: OJSC United Aircraft Corporation (2006–2015)
- Type: Public, PJSC
- Traded as: MCX: UNAC
- Industry: Aerospace, defense
- Predecessor: Ilyushin, Irkut, Mikoyan, Sukhoi, Tupolev, Yakovlev
- Founded: 20 February 2006; 20 years ago
- Founder: Vladimir Putin by presidential decree
- Headquarters: Leningradsky Avenue, Khoroshyovsky District, Moscow, Central, Russia
- Area served: Worldwide
- Key people: Denis Manturov (Chairman); Yury Slyusar (President)
- Products: Airliners (see list); Cargo aircraft (see list); Special-purposed aircraft (see list); Military aircraft (see list)
- Revenue: ▲ ₽476.5 billion (2023)
- Operating income: 11,203,000,000 Russian ruble (2016)
- Net income: 1,100,000,000 Russian ruble (2021)
- Total assets: 983,929,000,000 Russian ruble (2016)
- Owner: Rostec (92.31%); VEB (4.47%); Private investors (3.32%)
- Number of employees: 100,000
- Divisions: UAC Health; UAC - Transport Aircraft; LLC UAC - Aggregation Center
- Subsidiaries: see organization
- Website: www.uacrussia.ru

The PJSC United Aircraft Corporation (UAC; Russian: Объединённая авиастроительная корпорация, romanized: Obyedinyonnaya Aviastroitelnaya Korporatsiya; OAK) is a Russian aerospace and defense corporation. With a majority stake belonging to the Russian government, it consolidates Russian private and state-owned aircraft manufacturing companies and assets engaged in the manufacture, design, and sale of military, civilian, transport, and unmanned aircraft. Its corporate office is at Leningradsky Avenue, Khoroshyovsky District, Moscow.

Many of the corporation's assets are located in various regions in Russia, with joint ventures with foreign partners in China, India, and Italy.

== History ==
=== Predecessor ===
After the Soviet Union's sudden collapse in 1991, the aerospace industry of Russia was in turmoil. An excessive amount of imports and highly protective tariffs devastated the manufacturing industry, both the aerospace and the automotive industry. The military aircraft industry was able to benefit from improving export possibilities by profiting from a large storage of components and parts from Soviet times. In contrast, the civilian aircraft industry suffered large losses and production of civilian aircraft diminished significantly. For example, in 1990 Soviet industry produced 715 aircraft. Eight years later that number decreased by 661 to only 56 aircraft. In 2000 just four civilian aircraft were produced. To address this, the president of Russia at that time, Boris Yeltsin decided that consolidation was necessary. He decided to create the VPK-MAPO (Military Industrial Complex – Moscow Aircraft Production Association), which includes companies such as Mikoyan. The consolidation was not successful and MAPA later merged with Sukhoi.

=== 2006 amalgamation ===
The UAC was created on 20 February 2006 by Russian president Vladimir Putin in Presidential Decree No. 140 by merging shares from Ilyushin, Irkut, Mikoyan, Sukhoi, Tupolev, and Yakovlev as a new joint-stock company named the OJSC United Aircraft Corporation to optimize production and minimize losses. The UAC stated that the corporation was created to protect and develop the scientific and industrial potential of the Russian aircraft industry, the security and defense of the state, and the concentration of intellectual, industrial, and financial resources to implement long-term aviation programs. The United Aircraft Corporation started out producing the Tupolev Tu-154 "Careless", the Tupolev Tu-204, the Ilyushin Il-96, the Ilyushin Il-114, and all of Mikoyan, Sukhoi, Yakovlev, Tupolev, and Ilyushin military aircraft; all created before the corporation's creation.

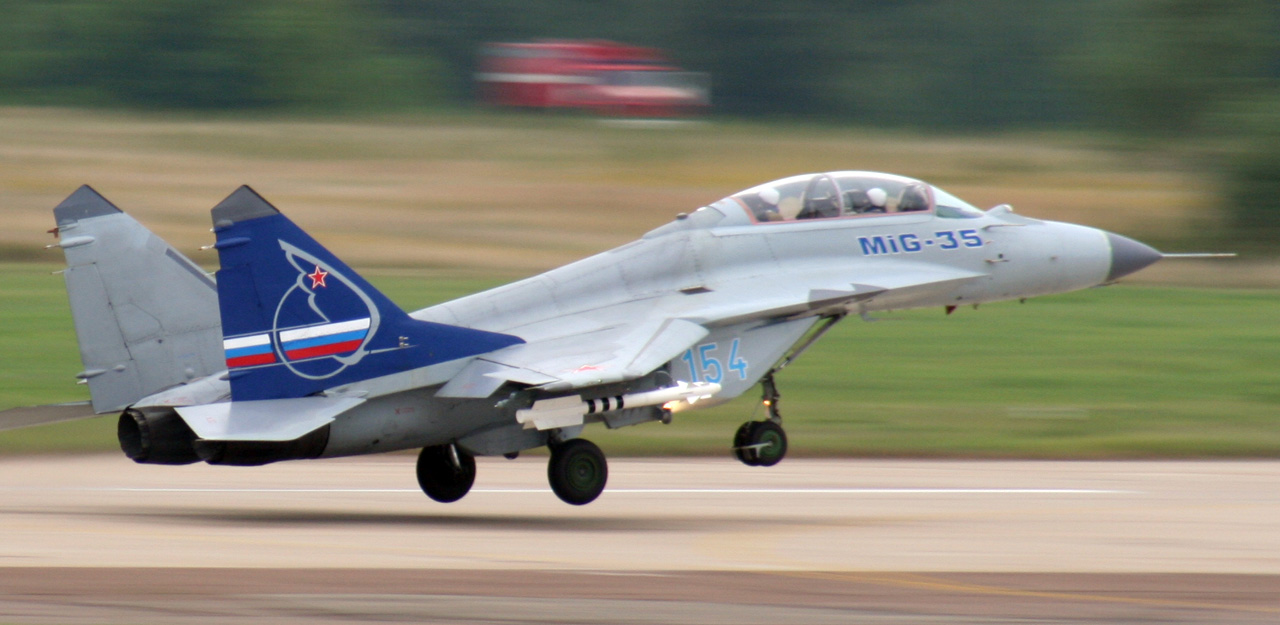
The Mikoyan MiG-35 is the first aircraft and first military aircraft to be developed under the UAC brand since Mikoyan became a branch of the corporation.

In February 2007, the UAC presented its first aircraft and the first military aircraft designed and exported under the UAC brand, the Mikoyan MiG-35, designated by NATO as "Fulcrum-F" and a Generation 4++ jet fighter by Mikoyan. The MiG-35 was officially presented during the Aero India 2007 air show in Bangalore, India and officially unveiled when the Russian Minister of Defense, Sergei Ivanov, visited the Lukhovitsky Machine Building Plant "MAPO-MIG". The MiG-35 was a contender for its fourth-generation counterparts in the Indian MRCA competition but was taken out of the competition in April 2011. The MiG-35 would be adopted by the Russian Air Force and was planned to be introduced in 2018.

In October 2007, the Federal Financial Markets Service registered a primary issue of common shares for the United Aircraft Building Corporation. The issue included 96,724,000,000 shares priced at 1 RUB = US$0.04. In December 2007, the state-owned Vneshtorgbank announced that it would sell its 5% share in EADS to UAC at market price. Later that month VTB sold its share in EADS to the state-owned Russian Development Bank (VEB). EADS already owned a 10% stake in Irkut in 2012, which it planned to convert into UAC shares, which would result in EADS and UAC owning shares of each other. They also announced plans for a possible 10–15% share issue in 2008, planning to retain a 75% stake. After placing 5 additional share issues, the Corporation's chartered capital amounts to 174.61 bln. RUB. The share of the Russian Federation in UAC's chartered capital is 80.29%.

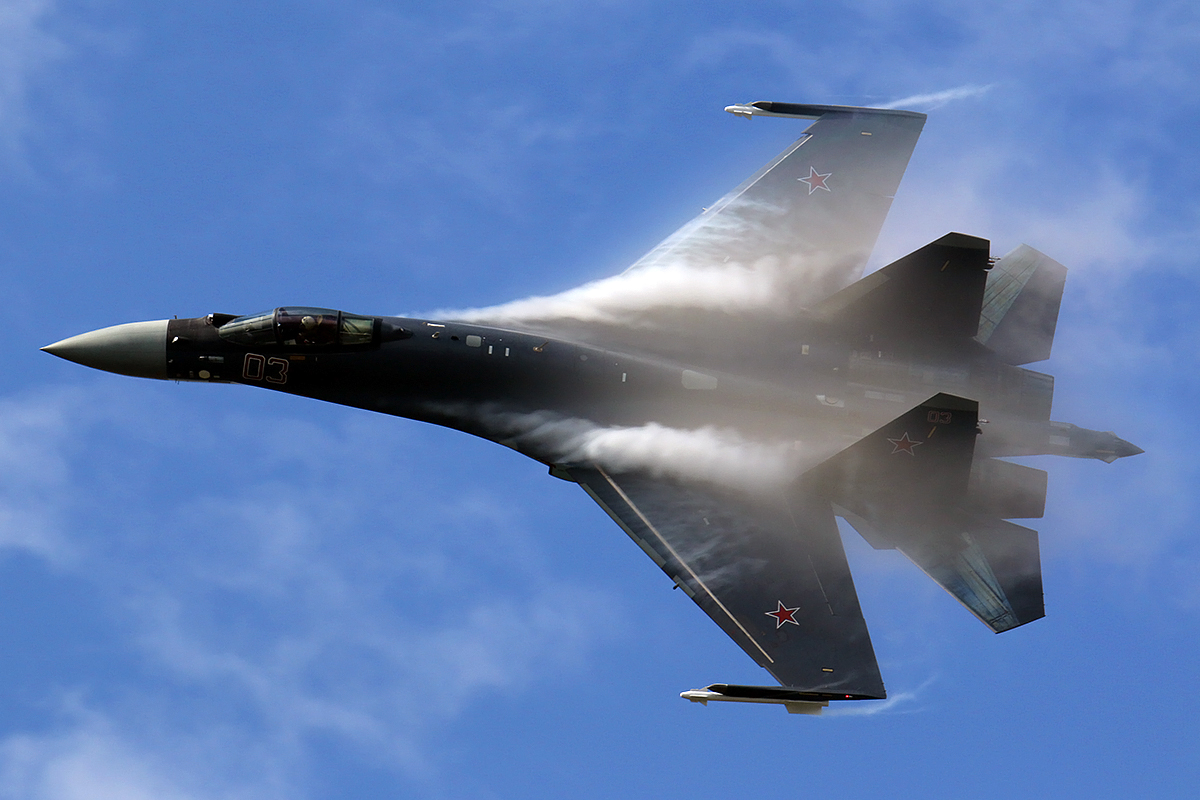
The Sukhoi Su-35 is the second military aircraft to be developed under the UAC brand and is meant to serve as the interim aircraft for the upcoming Sukhoi Su-57.

In February 2008, the UAC brought out an improved version of the Sukhoi Su-27, the Sukhoi Su-35S, also called the Su-35BM, which was to serve as the interim aircraft for the upcoming Sukhoi PAK FA, Russia's first fifth generation jet fighter. This is the second modernized version of the Su-27, where the first modernized version took place back on 28 June 1988, designated as the Sukhoi Su-27M, also known as the Su-35. The improved aircraft includes a reinforced airframe, air-trusted engines, radar, and improved avionics while excluding canards and an air brake. The Russian Air Force designated them as the Su-35S and ordered 98 units with additional orders from China and Indonesia. Sukhoi thought sales of the Su-35S would go over 160 but they are blunted by updated versions of the Sukhoi Su-30.

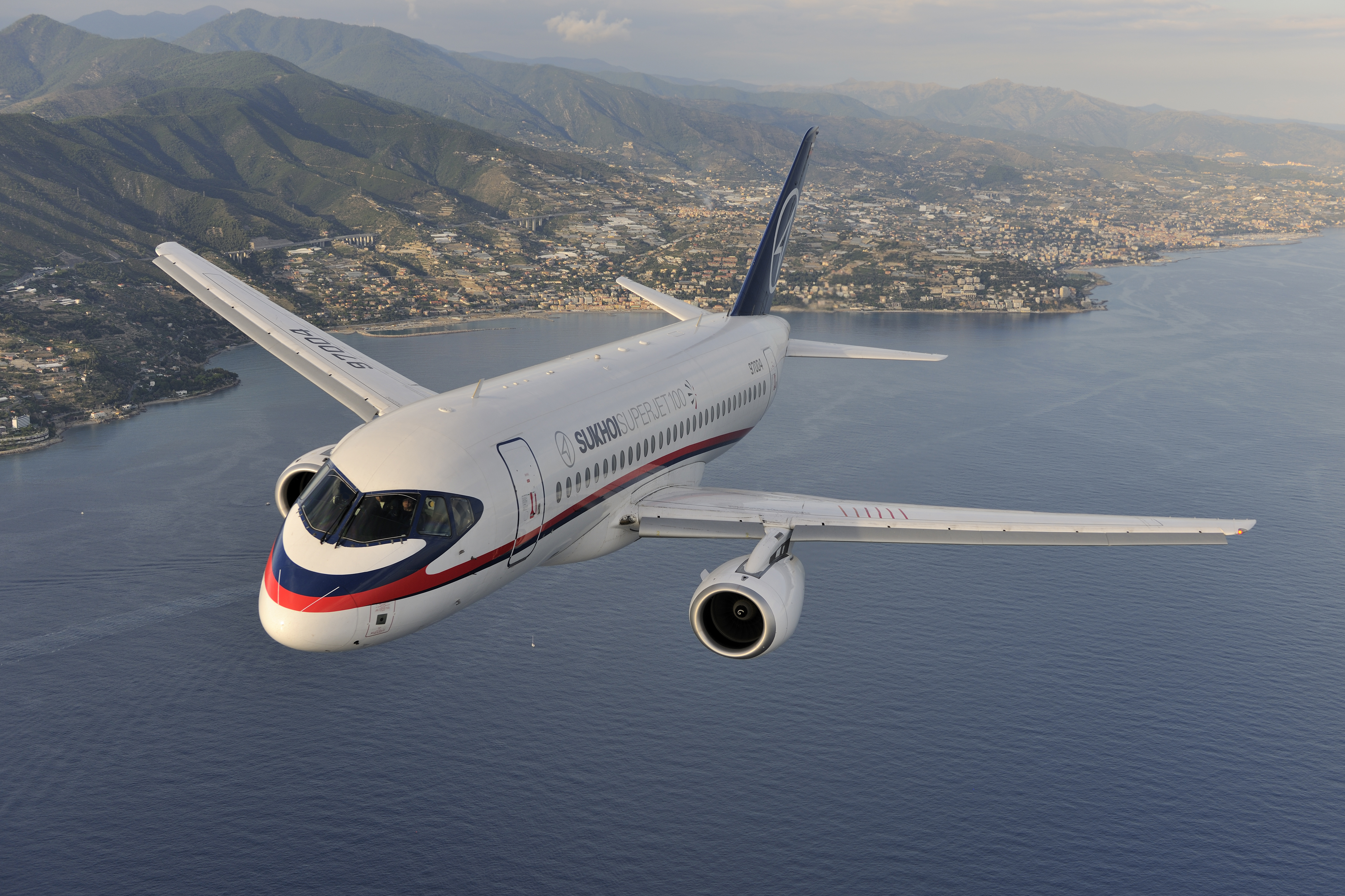
The Sukhoi Superjet 100 is the first airliner to be developed under the UAC brand, since Sukhoi Civil Aircraft became a branch of the corporation.

In May 2008, the UAC presented its third aircraft and the first airliner designed and exported under the UAC brand, the Sukhoi Superjet 100 (SSJ 100). The SSJ 100 is the fourth civilian aircraft and the first airliner to be made by Sukhoi. Previously, Sukhoi and Boeing made a cooperation agreement and which Boeing consultants would help and advise Sukhoi on the airliner. The SSJ 100 was introduced on 21 April 2011, with Armavia.

The Sukhoi Superjet 100 was subsequently described as the most important and the most successful airliner program of the Russian aerospace industry, and is regarded by the Ministry of Industry and Trade as a top priority project. Sukhoi Holdings of the UAC signed a joint venture with Leonardo-Finmeccanica (now Leonardo S.p.A.) to establish Superjet International to sell the SSJ 100 to potential customers.

In October 2009, the UAC signed a joint venture with Hindustan Aeronautics Limited (HAL) of India named the Multirole Transport Aircraft Limited (MTAL) where the two companies would cooperate on manufacturing aircraft for both of the Russian Armed Forces, the Indian Armed Forces, and for friendly third-party countries. One of the projects being developed in 2017 by the joint venture was the Ilyushin Il-214 Multirole Transport Aircraft (MTA) which was intended to replace India's Antonov An-32 transport fleet. The Il-214 was planned to perform regular transport duties as well as deploy paratroopers. The aircraft is planned to be revealed in 2017 and planned to be introduced in 2018.

In 2009, UAC delivered 90 aircraft, including 17 passenger models. This figure includes 31 MiG-29 and two Su-34 fighter jets produced for the Russian Air Force. The company's revenues for 2009 were expected to be 115 billion–120 billion rubles.

=== 2010–2020 ===
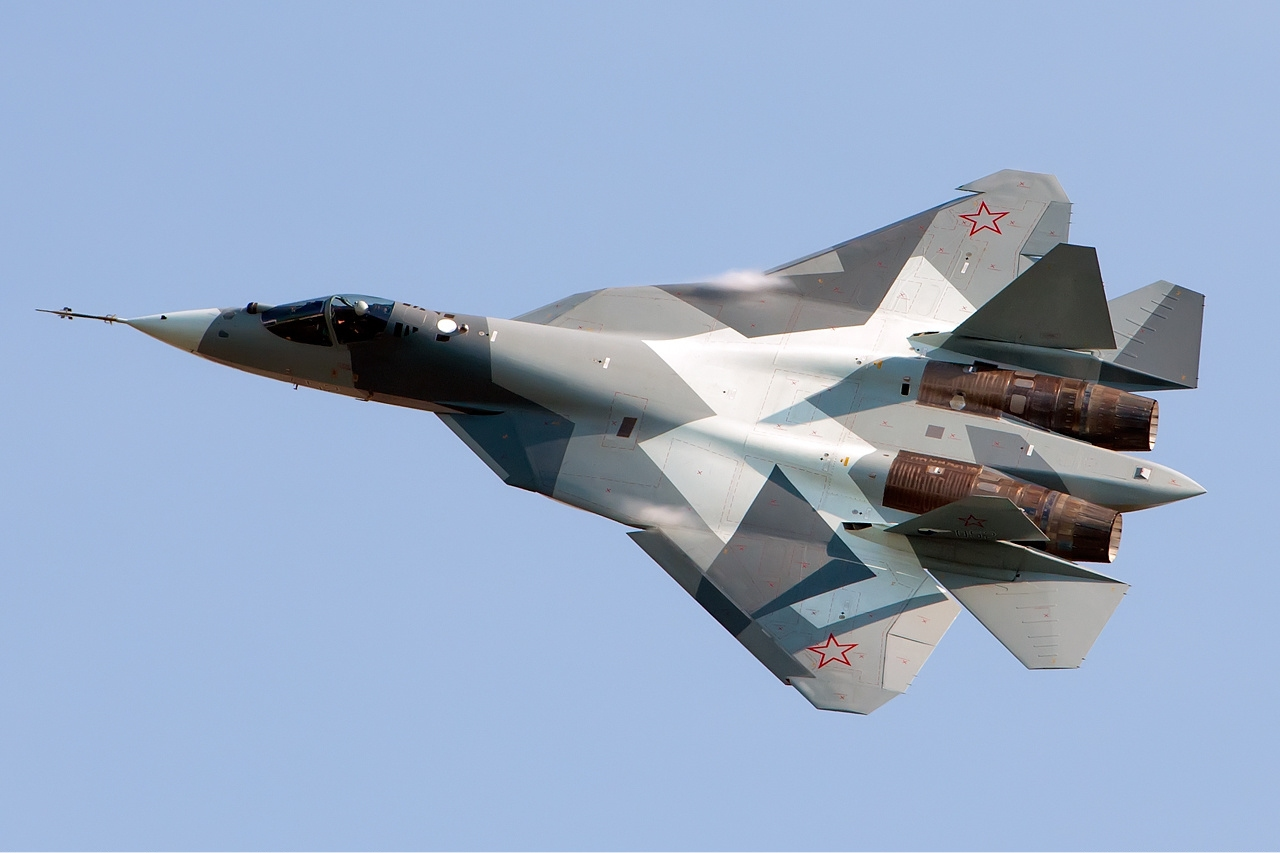
The Sukhoi Su-57 would be Russia's first fifth generation jet fighter, and is developed by Sukhoi, a branch of the corporation.

On 29 January 2010, Sukhoi and the UAC revealed Russia's first fifth generation jet fighter, the Sukhoi PAK FA (T-50). The PAK FA is a stealth, single-seat, twin-engine, multirole jet fighter designed for air supremacy and attack roles. The PAK FA would also be Russia's first aircraft to use stealth technology. The PAK FA was designed to replace the Mikoyan MiG-29 and the Sukhoi Su-27 and was expected to be introduced to the Russian Air Force in 2019. Also, under the MTAL joint venture, Sukhoi and HAL would co-develop the Sukhoi/HAL FGFA, now known as the Perspective Multirole Fighter (PMF), a variant of the PAK FA, of which would be designed for the Indian Air Force. On 11 August 2017, the Russian Air Force designated the Sukhoi PAK FA as the Sukhoi Su-57.

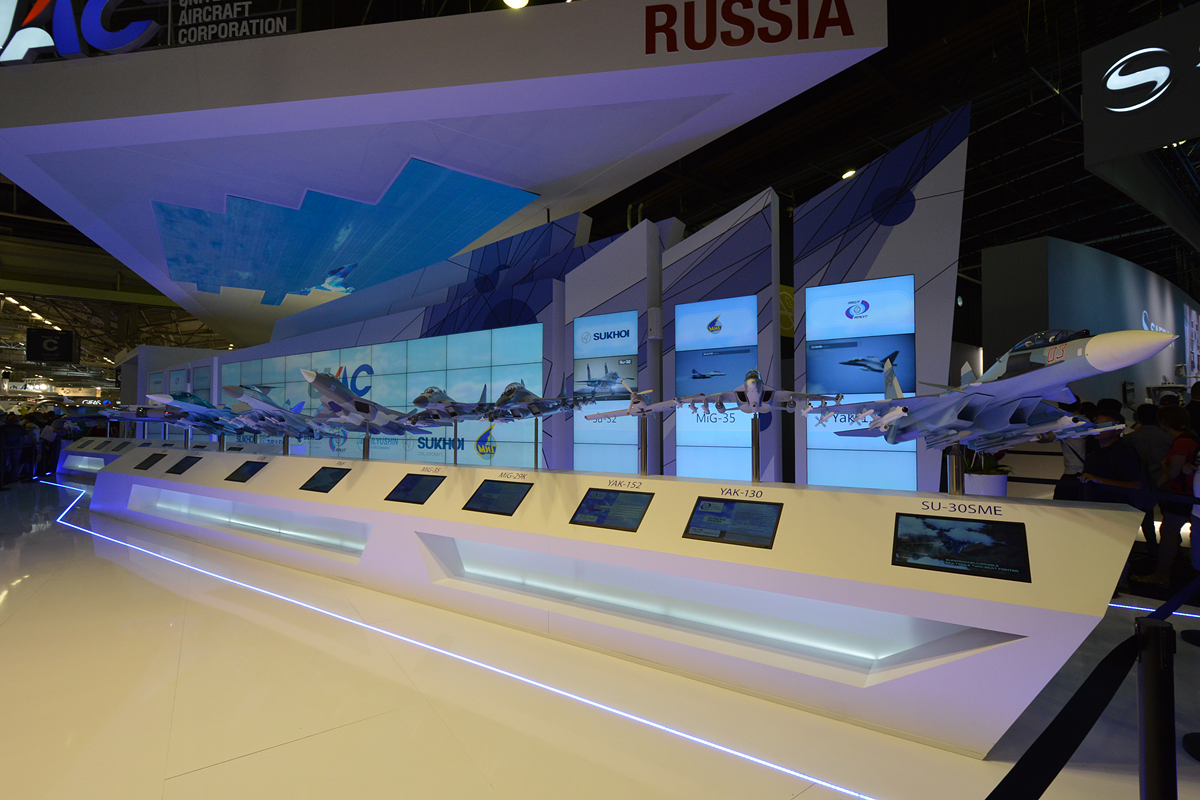
Lineup of military aircraft models of the UAC, 2017.

On 27 October 2010, the UAC and the Ukrainian state-owned aircraft corporation, Antonov, signed a joint venture contract, LLC UAC - Antonov, in the capital city of Ukraine, Kyiv. The purpose of the joint-venture was to deal with the coordination of Antonov and the UAC on purchasing spare parts, production, marketing, and sales, as well as servicing and joint creation of new modifications of Antonov aircraft, according to Defense-Aerospace.

In 2013, nine aircraft repair plants of the Ministry of Defense were transferred under the ownership of the UAC. As a result, in 2014, the serviceability of the Russian Air Force increased from 40% to 65%.

As a result of Russian military intervention in Ukraine in 2014, international sanctions were invoked against Russia, and because the UAC was part of Russia's aerospace and defense industry, it was sanctioned as well by the European Union. However, the 2014 sanctions did not include the civilian airliner industry of the UAC, such as the Sukhoi Superjet 100, exports of the regional jet to Western nations so the economic activities of Superjet International were not expected to be affected.

In April 2015, the company changed its full name to Public Joint-Stock Company (PJSC) "United Aircraft Corporation" (UAC). In the five years 2011–2015, UAC companies delivered to the Russian Defence Ministry more than 200 aircraft.

On 28 September 2015, according to a resolution by the Ukrainian government, the state-owned corporation Antonov would exit the LLC UAC - Antonov joint venture between the Russian and Ukrainian companies.

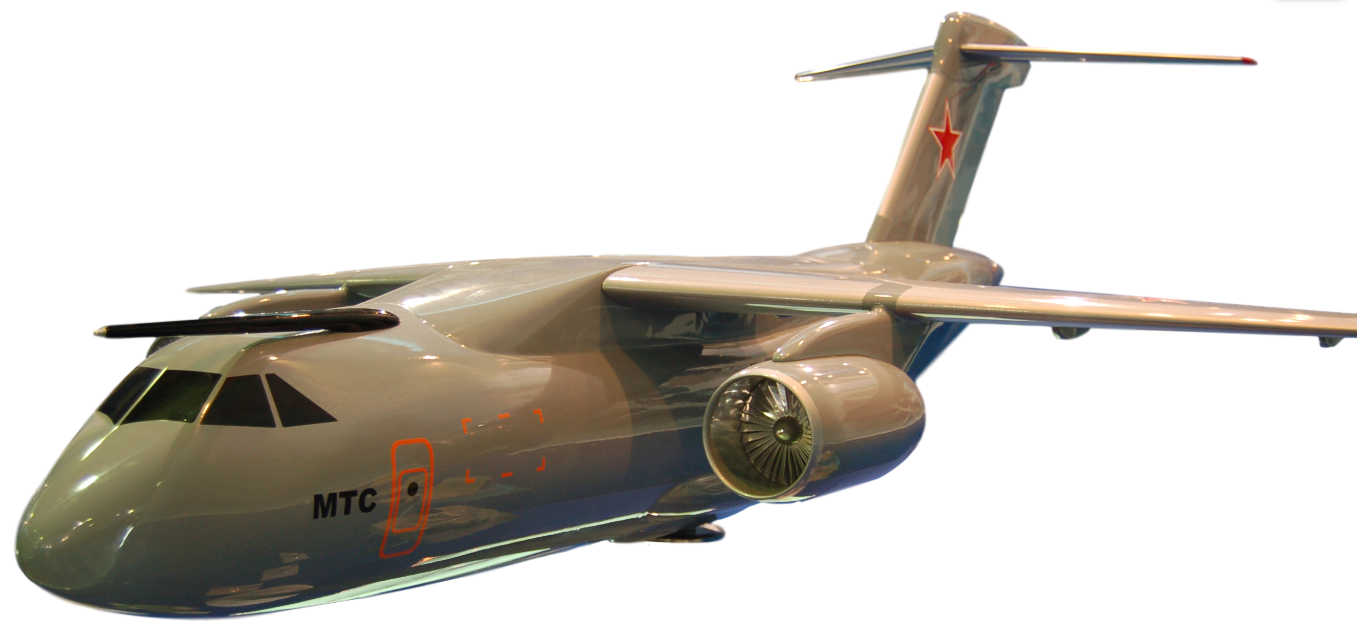
A model of the Ilyushin Il-214. The frustration between Ilyushin and India's HAL on working on the aircraft led to HAL resigning from the project. The aircraft was later renamed Il-276.

On 13 January 2016, India's HAL announced it would cease involvement in the Ilyushin Il-214 MTA project, and that Ilyushin would have to work on the project alone. The project was subsequently redesignated as the "Ilyushin Il-214" (with the MTA removed) since the project is no longer under the Multirole Transport Aircraft Limited joint-venture.

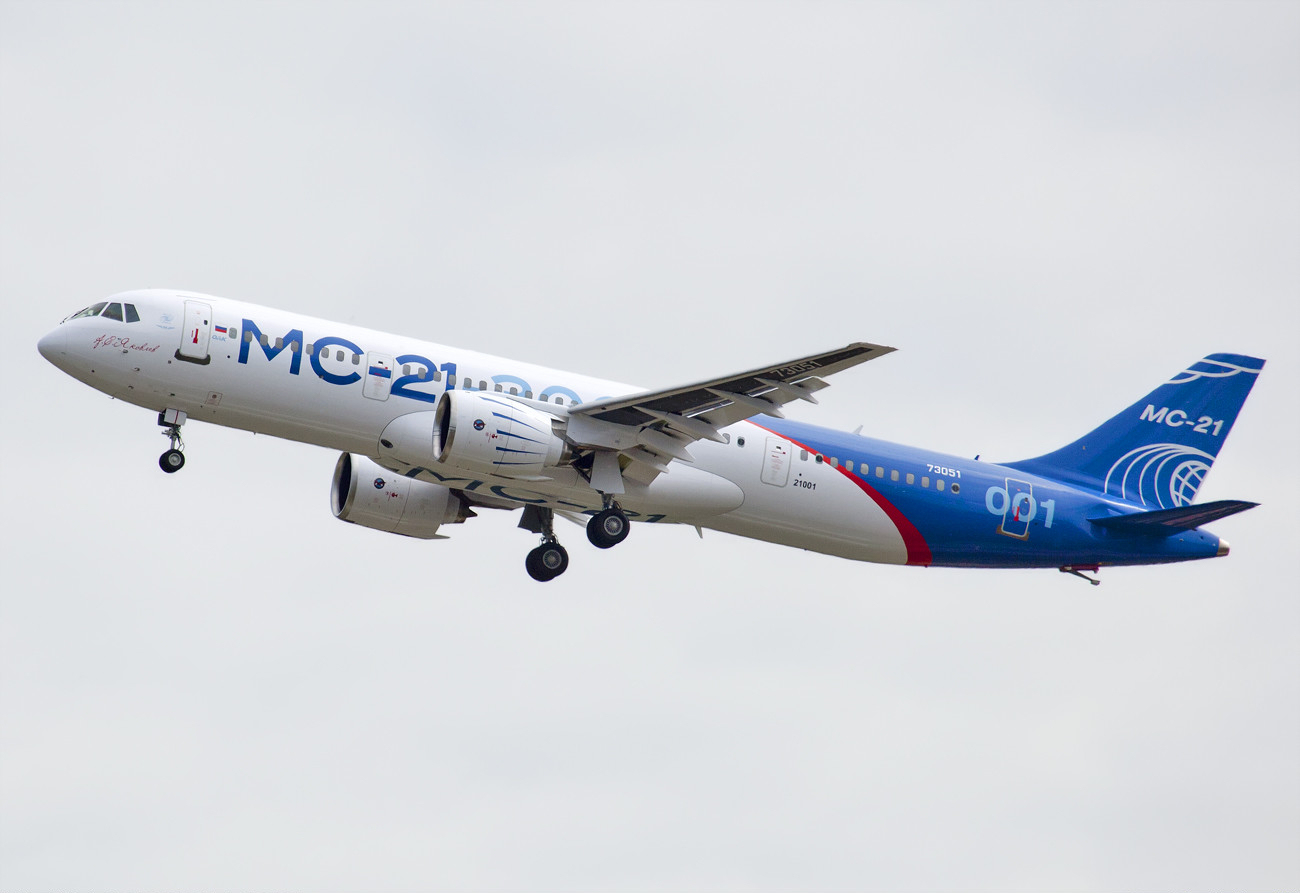
The first medium-range jet airliner developed under the UAC brand, the Irkut MC-21, on its maiden flight on 28 May 2017.

On 8 June 2016, UAC officially revealed the Irkut MC-21, its first medium-range jet airliner, when it rolled out in Irkutsk. The aircraft could be the first with an out of autoclave composite manufacturing for its wings. The goal of the MC-21 was to replace the Tupolev Tu-154, Tupolev Tu-134, Tupolev Tu-204, and the Yakovlev Yak-42. and to compete with the Airbus A320neo and the Boeing B737 MAX. Despite the domination of the airliner market by Boeing and Airbus as well as Russian protectionism preventing western companies from being suppliers to the program, the MC-21 was able to make its maiden flight on 28 May 2017, with two prototypes built and another four in assembly, while obtaining a total of 205 orders by July 2017, with an introduction planned in 2019 with Aeroflot.

In 2018, the United Aircraft Corporation's revenue amounted to 53 billion rubles.

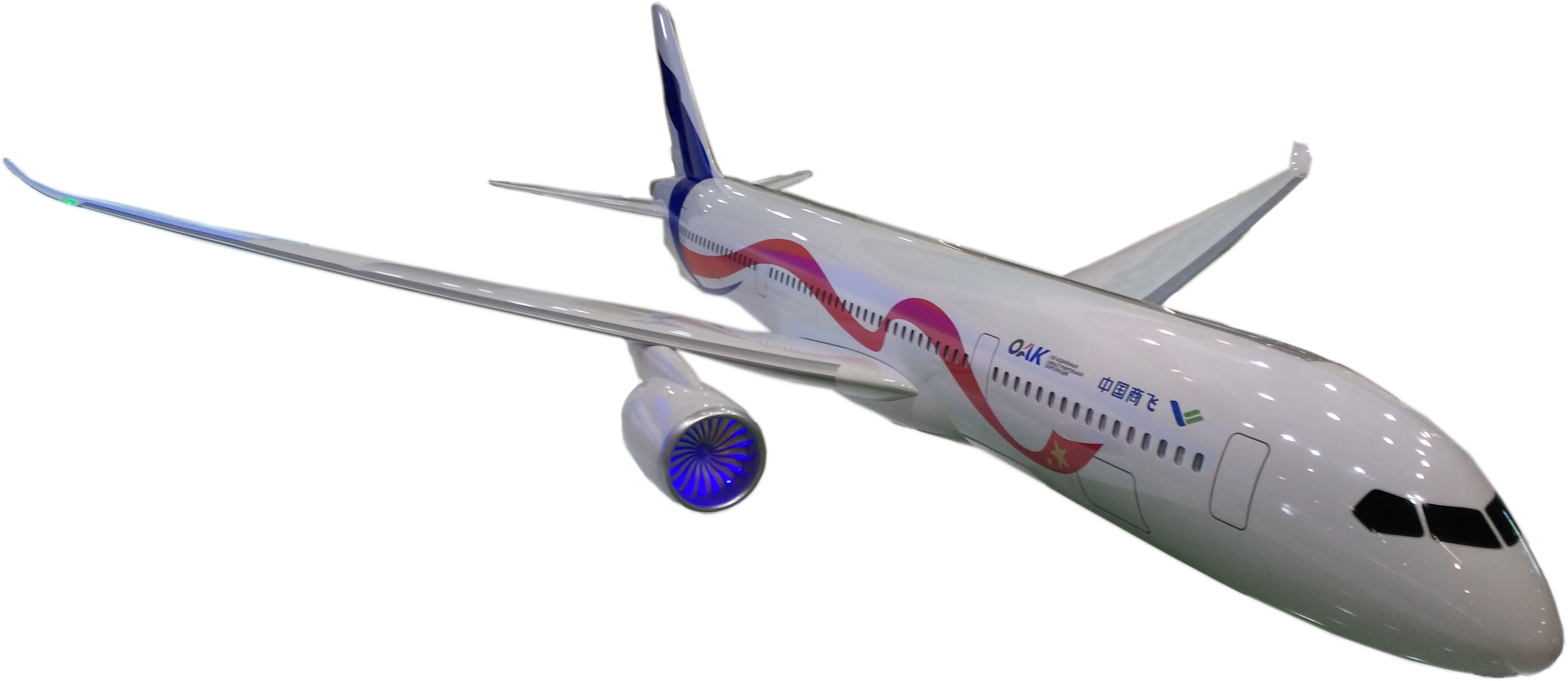
A model of the CRAIC CR929, an airliner designed by the UAC and Comac in a joint-venture agreement to break the Airbus-Boeing duopoly.

On 25 June 2016, the UAC and the Chinese Government-owned aircraft corporation, Comac, signed a joint venture contract to create China-Russia Aircraft International Co, Ltd. (CRAIC), to be based in Shanghai to develop a commercial aircraft. According to the UAC, CRAIC is responsible for product and technology development, manufacturing, marketing, sales and customer service, consulting, program management, and other related fields. By 2017, the two companies were cooperating in creating a new generation of long-range wide-body commercial aircraft and taking charge of its operation under the joint venture. The aircraft was named the CRAIC CR-929, formerly the C929, and is intended to compete with the Airbus A330neo and the Boeing 787; thus challenging the Airbus-Boeing duopoly.

On 1 September 2017, the UAC Board of Directors, and UAC's subsidiaries, Sukhoi Civil Aircraft and the Irkut Corporation agreed to merge the civil industry Irkut Corporation and the Sukhoi Civil Aircraft into a Civil Aviation Division based on Irkut Corporation, with the intent being that Sukhoi would become the financial entity for all civil aircraft produced by UAC. According to UAC, the corporate restructuring was aimed at realizing UAC's strategic goal to increase the share of civil products in its portfolio to 45% by 2035 and to drive annual civil aircraft production to 100–120 aircraft per year, as well as to increase UAC's economic effectiveness and lower costs by centralizing supporting processes and decreasing levels of management. The transformation was intended to concentrate resources to develop, manufacture, and market Russian civil aircraft, while ensuring consistency in these areas and simplifying certification and licensing procedures.

On 9 July 2018, UAC was targeting 4.5% of global airliner market share by value and profitability by 2025, to grow its civil aircraft business from 17% to 40% of its income and to attract private investors before 2035.

On 25 October 2018, the United Aircraft Corporation was acquired from the Federal Agency for State Property Management by Russian conglomerate state corporation Rostec, with a turnover cost over one billion rubles (US$15 million). This would result in all Russian national aviation assets being put in the hands of Rostec, as Rostec also owns the helicopter monopoly Russian Helicopters and the engine monopoly United Engine Corporation. Rostec had stated it was willing to invest up to 40 billion rubles into the MC-21, taking some burden away from the federal budget. The restructuring was to be completed within 18 months.

=== 2020–present ===
On 30 November 2021, the UAC board of directors approved the annexation to the corporation of both military aircraft producers Mikoyan and Sukhoi, previewed for 2022. The daily management of both is already made by UAC. In January 2022, UAC shareholders approved the annexation. As of 2022, UAC was 88 percent owned by Rostec.

On 22 March 2022, it was remarked that the Russian aviation industry was not receiving imported parts already paid for as a result of the 2022 Russian invasion of Ukraine.

The company and its CEO Yury Slyusar were sanctioned by the British government on 24 February 2022, as it was judged to have aided in the Russian invasion of Ukraine. In May 2022 the United States Department of the Treasury placed sanctions on Slyusar under Executive Order 14024 as a member of the Government of Russia.

The conglomerate finished the process of Mikoyan and Sukhoi absorption in June 2022. Relevant records were changed on June 1 in the United States Register of Legal Entities.

UAC said in late December 2023 that it had successfully performed the year's state defense orders.

== Organization ==
Company structure:

=== Aircraft manufacturers ===
- Aviastar-SP
- Beriev
- Ilyushin
- Yakovlev
  - Branch: Regional Aircraft-Branch of the Irkut Corporation (before:Sukhoi Civil Aircraft)
  - Branch: Irkutsk Aviation Plant
  - Branch: Yakovlev Design Bureau
- Myasishchev
- Mikoyan
  - Branch: Sokol Plant
- Sukhoi
  - Design Bureau
  - Civil Aircraft (now acquired by Irkut Corporation)
  - Branch: Komsomolsk-on-Amur Aircraft Production Association
  - Branch: Novosibirsk Aircraft Production Association
- Tupolev
  - Branch: Kazan Aircraft Production Association
- Voronezh Aircraft Production Association

=== Divisions ===
- UAC Health
- UAC - Transport Aircraft
- LLC UAC - Aggregation Center

=== Business and financial activities ===
- Finance Leasing Company
- Ilyushin Finance Co.
- LLC UAC - Purchases
- Sukhoi Holdings

=== Joint ventures ===
- China-Russia Aircraft International Co, Ltd. (CRAIC) with Comac
- LLC UAC with Antonov (terminated in 2015)
- Multirole Transport Aircraft Limited with Hindustan Aeronautics Limited
- SuperJet International (with Leonardo S.p.A.); in May 2022, Italian local police froze the assets of 146 million euros ($153 million) owned by Superjet International due to EU sanctions against Russia for its invasion of Ukraine.

=== Material providers ===
- KAPO-Composit
- AeroComposit
  - Ulyanovsk Branch

=== Others ===
- Gromov Flight Research Institute

== Products ==
This section contains present and future products to be distributed under UAC umbrella

=== Airliners ===
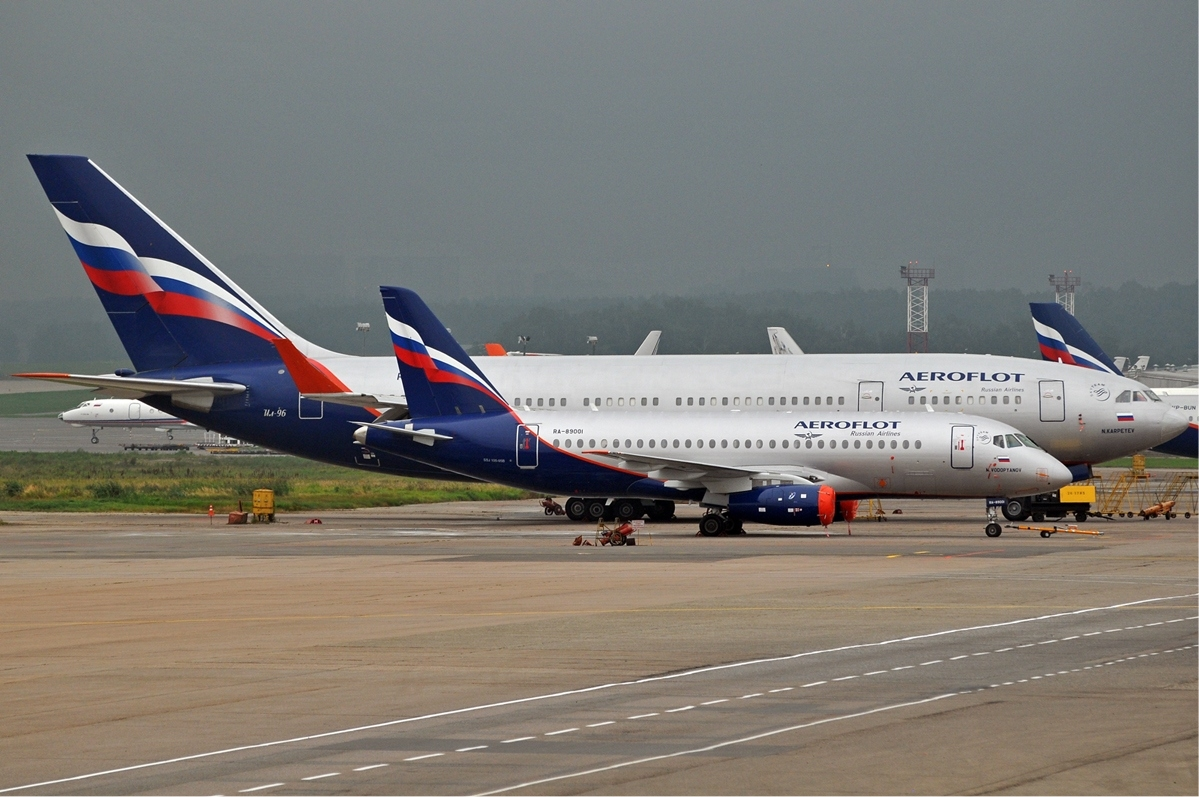
Ilyushin Il-96 and Yakovlev SJ-100 of Aeroflot

The United Aircraft Corporation started out producing the Tupolev Tu-154, the Tupolev Tu-204, the Ilyushin Il-86, the Ilyushin Il-96, and the Ilyushin Il-114, all created before the UAC merger.

The Tupolev Tu-154 is now-discontinued a medium-range, narrow-body, three-engine jet airliner developed and introduced in Soviet times. It saw large use in Aeroflot and was exported to many nations that had connections to the Soviet Union, and a total of 1,026 were built. Production of the Tu-154 stopped in 2013. Following a crash in 2016, all Russian Tu-154s were grounded, and now the airliner is in limited service by a few airlines and militaries.

The Ilyushin Il-86 is a short/medium-range, wide-body jet airliner, developed and introduced in Soviet times as well. The Ilyushin Il-86 was the first Soviet wide-body airliner and the world's second four-engine wide-body airliner developed. The Il-86 was praised for its safety and reliability, but only 106 were built, as a result of many delays during development. Production of the airliner stopped in 1995, and the airliner was retired by civil operators in 2011, with only four in service in the Russian Air Force for VIP transport.

The Ilyushin Il-96 is a shortened, longer-ranged successor to the Il-86, with updated technologies, and the first airliner from the Russian Federation to be introduced. Only 30 were built however. The Il-96's production ended in 2009, as it was deemed inferior to its Boeing and Airbus counterparts.

The Tupolev Tu-204 is a medium-range, narrow-body jet airliner featuring many technological advancements such as a fly-by-wire control system and a glass cockpit which was developed primarily for Aeroflot. The Tupolev Tu-214 is a later variant. Production of the Tu-214 continues with an updated version featuring almost entirely Russian parts developed in response to sanctions following the 2022 Russian invasion of Ukraine.

The Ilyushin Il-114 is a turboprop, narrow-body regional airliner developed to replace the Antonov An-24, which most were in service of Aeroflot. However, only 20 had been built, and only two airlines were using it, so the Il-114's production was temporarily halted. The Il-114's production and development restarted as the Ilyushin Il-114-300, now with all-Russian parts, with an introduction planned in 2026.

The Yakovlev SJ-100, originally called the Sukhoi Super Jet, is the first regional jet and airliner in general that was developed and exported entirely under UAC; it was developed by Sukhoi's Civil Aircraft division, a branch of the UAC, which was later transferred to Yakovlev Corporation, another UAC branch. The SJ-100 was designed to compete with the Embraer E-Jet series and the Bombardier CSeries (now the Airbus 220), and to replace the aging Tupolev Tu-134 and the Yakovlev Yak-42 jet airliners. The SJ-100 was later described as the most important and the most successful airliner program of the Russian aerospace industry, and is regarded by the Ministry of Industry and Trade as a top priority project.

The Yakovlev MC-21 is the newest jet airliner developed under the UAC brand, developed by the Yakovlev Corporation. The goal of the MC-21 is to replace the Tupolev Tu-154, Tupolev Tu-134, Tupolev Tu-204, and the Yakovlev Yak-42. and to compete with the Airbus A320neo and the Boeing 737 MAX. Despite the domination of the airliner market by Boeing and Airbus as well as Russian protectionism preventing western companies to supply the program, the MC-21 was able to have its maiden flight, have two prototypes built and another four in assembly, and getting a total of 366 orders as of 24 July 2017, with an introduction planned in 2019 with Aeroflot. As a result of sanctions following the 2022 invasion of Ukraine preventing access to western parts suppliers, the introduction was delayed to redevelop the airliner with almost entirely Russian parts, with the new date planned for 2025.

CRAIC, a joint-venture between the UAC and Chinese aircraft corporation Comac, was formed to design a wide-body jet to compete with the Boeing 787 and the Airbus A330neo. After tensions with the Chinese company, and amidst the 2022 invasion of Ukraine, UAC withdrew from the project in 2023; development is being continued by Comac alone as the Comac C929.

List of airliners of UAC
Aircraft	Type	Description	Developer	Seats	Number Built	Maiden Flight	Introduction	Production Ceased	Retired
Tupolev Tu-154	jet airliner	narrow-body, trijet	Tupolev	164	1,026	4 October 1968	7 February 1972, with Aeroflot	2013	-
Ilyushin Il-86	jet airliner	wide-body, four engines	Ilyushin Aviation Complex	359	106	22 December 1976	1980, with Aeroflot	1995	2011 (as an airliner)
Ilyushin Il-96	jet airliner	wide-body, four engines	Ilyushin Aviation Complex	262	30	28 September 1988	29 December 1992, with Aeroflot	2009	-
Tupolev Tu-204/Tu-214	jet airliner	narrow-body, twinjet	Tupolev	210	82	2 January 1989	1995, with Aeroflot	-	-
Ilyushin Il-114	regional airliner	twin turboprop	Ilyushin Aviation Complex	64	20	29 March 1990	August 1998, with Uzbekistan Airways	July 2012, production restarted with Ilyushin Il-114-300	-
Yakovlev SJ-100	regional jet airliner	narrow-body, twinjet	Sukhoi Civil Aircraft (now Yakovlev Corporation)	87	172	19 May 2008	21 April 2011, with Armavia	-	-
Yakovlev MC-21	jet airliner	narrow-body, twinjet	Yakovlev Corporation	163	2	28 May 2017	2025, with Aeroflot (planned)	-	-
Ilyushin Il-114-300	regional airliner	twin turboprop	Ilyushin Aviation Complex	52	0	16 December 2020	Planned in 2026	-	-

=== Cargo ===
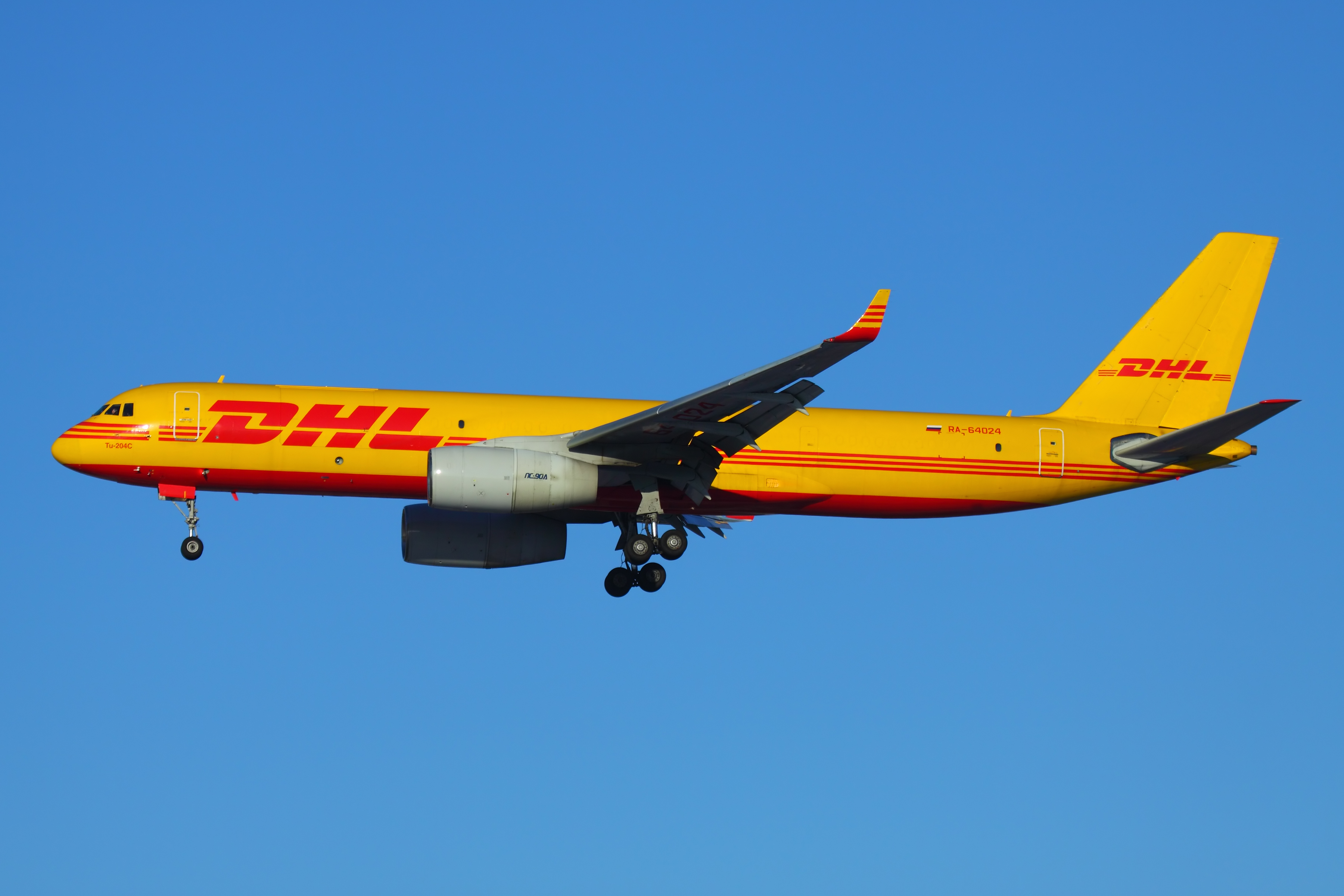
Tupolev Tu-204C under service of the DHL Aviation and operated by Aviastar-TU

The United Aircraft Corporation started out producing the Ilyushin Il-96-400T and the Tupolev Tu-204C, both cargo variants of their airliner counterparts, and the Sukhoi Su-80, a twin-turboprop, twin-boom STOL aircraft. The Il-96-400T is a freight version of the Il-96-400, which features Russian avionics and engines and carries more room than the standard Il-96. The Sukhoi Su-80 can be used for both civilian and military purposes and has a sleek hull which can provide space for 30 passengers and a "beaver-tail" ramp that can help unload cargo easier. The Su-80 was made by Sukhoi Civil Aircraft to replace the Antonov An-24/26, the Antonov An-28, and the Yakovlev Yak-40, and to compete with the Antonov An-38.

The Ilyushin Il-214 was formerly a project designated as the "Ilyushin Il-214 Multirole Transport Aircraft" under the joint venture between the UAC and HAL. The project was first conceived in 2007, two to three years before the joint venture, "Multirole Transport Aircraft Ltd." between the two state corporations was created, and development began in 2012. However, the team under Ilyushin Aviation Complex, a branch of the UAC, and the team under HAL had many disagreements and misunderstandings. In January 2016, Ilyushin halted the project, and HAL announced it would not be involved in the Ilyushin Il-214 MTA project anymore, and that Ilyushin would have to work on the project alone. The project is now designated as the "Ilyushin Il-214" with the MTA taken out since the project is no longer under the Multirole Transport Aircraft Ltd. joint venture. The Il-214 was later renamed the Ilyushin Il-276 in October 2017.

The Ilyushin Il-112 is a high-wing, light, military transport aircraft based on the Ilyushin Il-114 currently being developed by Ilyushin Aviation Complex for air landing and airdrop. Development of the aircraft started before 2011, the year of which the maiden flight of the Ilyushin Il-112 is supposed to occur. The project was later abandoned in May 2011 by the Russian Ministry of Defense and seven Antonov An-140T were purchased. The project was later continued in January 2013 and a maiden flight conducted in 2019.

List of Cargo Aircraft of UAC
Aircraft	Type	Description	Developer	Number Built	Maiden Flight
Ilyushin Il-96-400T	transport aircraft	four engines	Ilyushin Aviation Complex	2	28 September 1988 (as standard Ilyushin Il-96)
Tupolev Tu-204C	transport aircraft	twinjet	Tupolev	7	2 January 1989 (as standard Tupolev Tu-204)
Sukhoi Su-80	STOL transport aircraft	twin-turboprop, twin-boom	Sukhoi Civil Aircraft	8	4 September 2001
Ilyushin Il-276	military transport aircraft	medium air-lift	Ilyushin Aviation Complex, Hindustan Aeronautics Limited (formerly)	0	Planned in 2023
Ilyushin Il-112 Ilyushin Il-212	light military transport	turboprop, two engines, high-wing turbofan, two engines, high-wing	Ilyushin Aviation Complex	3 prototypes	30 March 2019

=== Special purposes ===
The Beriev Aircraft Company is a branch of the UAC that specializes in special purposes and amphibious aircraft. The Beriev Be-200 "Altair", based on the Beriev A-40 "Albatross", was designed before the UAC's creation and is a multi-purpose amphibious aircraft. The Be-200 is marketed as a firefighter, search and rescue aircraft, maritime patrol aircraft, cargo aircraft, and an airliner. The Beriev A-100 is an airborne early warning and control aircraft designed to replace the Beriev A-50, also made by Beriev. Its maiden flight was on 26 October 2016, with an introduction with the Russian Air Force. The A-100 is developed from the Ilyushin Il-476 with avionics and configuration being similar to the A-50U as well as a new active phased array radar made by JSC Vega.

List of Special Purposed Aircraft of UAC
Aircraft	Type	Description	Developer	Number Built	Maiden Flight	Introduction
Beriev Be-200 "Altair"	multirole amphibian	twin-seat	Beriev	19	24 September 1998	2003
Beriev A-100	airborne early warning and control	four engines, turbofan	Beriev	1	26 October 2016	-

=== Military ===
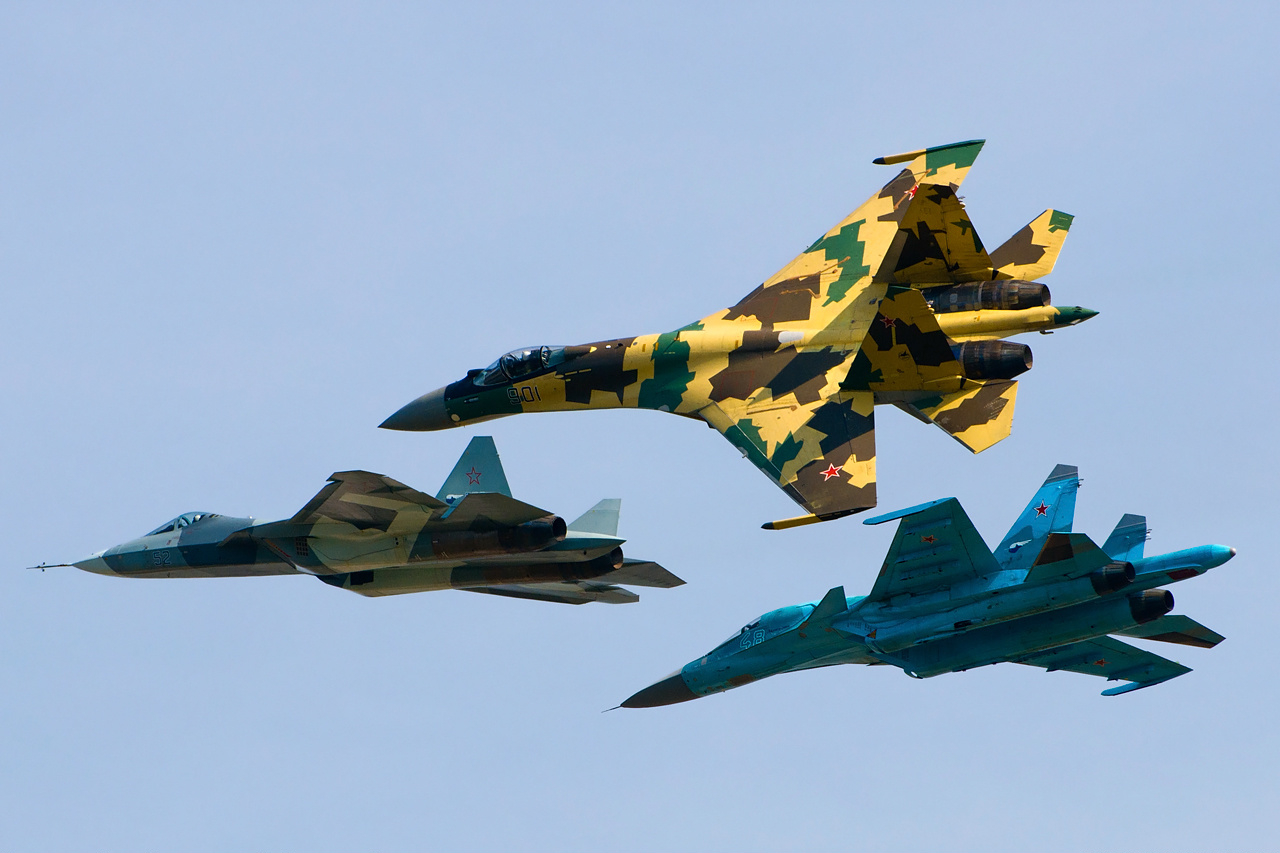
The Su-35S, Su-34, and the Su-57 PAK FA, all designed by the Sukhoi Design Bureau, a branch of the UAC

Most of the military aircraft produced by the UAC were designed before the corporation's creation, many of them designed in the Soviet era. Jet fighters such as the Sukhoi Su-25 "Grach", Sukhoi Su-27 "Sofiyka", Mikoyan MiG-29, Sukhoi Su-33, Sukhoi Su-30, and the Sukhoi Su-34, and large military aircraft such as the Ilyushin Il-76, Tupolev Tu-160 "Beliy Lebed", and the Ilyushin Il-78, were all designed in the Soviet Union. However, though, some Soviet aircraft such as the Tupolev Tu-160 "Beliy Lebed", Sukhoi Su-33, Sukhoi Su-30, and the Sukhoi Su-34, were introduced later in the Russian Federation, the Soviet Union's successor. The Yakovlev Yak-130 is the only aircraft to be developed after the Soviet era and before the creation of the UAC.

The Mikoyan MiG-35 is the first aircraft and the first military aircraft designed and exported under the UAC brand, as Mikoyan, the company that designed it, is a branch of the corporation. The MiG-35 was a contender for its fourth-generation counterparts in the Indian MRCA competition but was taken out of the competition in April 2011. The MiG-35 would be adopted by the Russian Air Force and introduced in 2018. The Sukhoi Su-35S, the UAC's second military aircraft, is designed by the Sukhoi Design Bureau, a branch of the UAC. The aircraft is to serve as the interim for the Sukhoi PAK FA, Russia's first fifth-generation jet fighter. This is the second modernized version of the Su-27, where the first modernized version took place back on 28 June 1988, designated as the Sukhoi Su-27M, also known as the Su-35. The improved aircraft includes a reinforced airframe, air-thrusted engines, radar, and improved avionics while excluding canards and an air brake. The Russian Air Force designated them as the Su-35S and ordered 98 units with additional orders from China and Indonesia. Sukhoi thought sales of the Su-35S would go over 160 but they are blunted by updated versions of the Sukhoi Su-30. 30 Tupolev Tu-22M3 bombers would be upgraded to the Tupolev Tu-22M3M with advanced avionics, ability to use air-to-surface weaponry, hardware components, and adapted for extended ranged weaponry. The first flight is scheduled for August 2018. Remaining Tupolev Tu-22M3 bombers would be undergoing modernization.

The Sukhoi PAK FA, designated by the Russian Air Force as the Sukhoi Su-57, under the Prospective Airborne Complex (PAK) platform, would be the first Russian aircraft to use stealth technology, as well as being Russia's first fifth-generation jet fighter, as stated before. The Sukhoi Su-57 would replace the aging Sukhoi Su-27 and the Mikoyan MiG-29 in the Russian Air Force with an introduction in 2020. Other aircraft being developed under the PAK platform are the Ilyushin PAK TA, a heavy transport aircraft, the Tupolev PAK DA, a strategic bomber, and the Mikoyan PAK DP, a new fast interceptor aircraft.

At the MAKS 2021 Air show UAC announced that the Mikoyan LMFS project was developed into the Sukhoi LFS.

In August 2023, Yury Slyusar reported that UAC had received an additional order for the equipment of the new Moscow and Leningrad military districts.

All of the aircraft listed were either put into or going into service in the Russian Air Force.

List of Military Aircraft of UAC
Aircraft	NATO Designation Name	Type	Description	Developer	Number Built	Maiden Flight	Introduction
Ilyushin Il-76	Candid	strategic airlifter	four engines, turbofan	Ilyushin Aviation Complex	960	25 March 1971	June 1974
Sukhoi Su-25 "Grach"	Frogfoot	close air support	twinjet, single-seat	Sukhoi Design Bureau	1000+	22 February 1975	19 July 1981
Sukhoi Su-27 "Sofiyka"	Flanker	multirole fighter, air superiority fighter	twinjet, single-seat	Sukhoi Design Bureau	809	20 May 1977	22 June 1985
Mikoyan MiG-29	Fulcrum	multirole fighter, air superiority fighter	twinjet, single-seat	Mikoyan	1600+	6 October 1977	July 1982
Tupolev Tu-22M3 "Troika"	Backfire-C	supersonic maritime strike bomber	variable-sweep wing, twinjet, turbofan	Tupolev	268	30 August 1969 (as Tu-22M)	March 1989
Tupolev Tu-160 "Beliy Lebed"	Blackjack	supersonic strategic bomber	variable-sweep wing, four engines, turbofan	Tupolev	27 serial and 8 prototypes	19 December 1981	30 December 2005
Ilyushin Il-78	Midas	inflight refuelling tanker	four engines	Ilyushin Aviation Complex	53	26 June 1983	1984
Sukhoi Su-33	Flanker-D	carrier-based multirole fighter, air superiority fighter	twinjet, single-seat	Sukhoi Design Bureau	35	17 August 1987	31 August 1998
Sukhoi Su-30	Flanker-C	multirole fighter	twinjet, twin-seat	Sukhoi Design Bureau	540+	31 December 1989	1996
Sukhoi Su-34	Fullback	fighter-bomber, strike fighter	twinjet, twin-seat	Sukhoi Design Bureau	155	13 April 1990	20 March 2014
Yakovlev Yak-130	Mitten	advanced trainer, light fighter	twinjet, twin-seat	Yakovlev Design Bureau	186+	25 April 1996	19 February 2010
Mikoyan MiG-35	Fulcrum-F	multirole fighter	twinjet, single-seat/twin-seat	Mikoyan	6 serial, 2 pre-series	February 2007	2018
Sukhoi Su-35S	Flanker-E	multirole fighter, air superiority fighter	twinjet, single-seat	Sukhoi Design Bureau	151+	19 February 2008	February 2014
Sukhoi Su-57 PAK FA	Felon	stealth aircraft, air superiority fighter	twinjet, single-seat	Sukhoi Design Bureau	21, including prototypes	29 January 2010	25 December 2020
Tupolev Tu-22M3M "Troika"	Backfire-C	supersonic maritime strike bomber	variable-sweep wing, twinjet, turbofan	Tupolev	30 Tu-22M3 being upgraded	30 August 1969 (as Tu-22M)	August 2018
Yakovlev Yak-152	-	trainer aircraft	single-seat	Yakovlev Design Bureau	4 prototypes	29 September 2016	Planned
Tupolev PAK DA	-	strategic bomber	under development	Tupolev	0	Planned for 2023	Planned for 2028
Ilyushin PAK TA	-	heavy military transport	under development	Ilyushin Aviation Complex	0	N/A	Planned for 2030

== Corporate governance ==
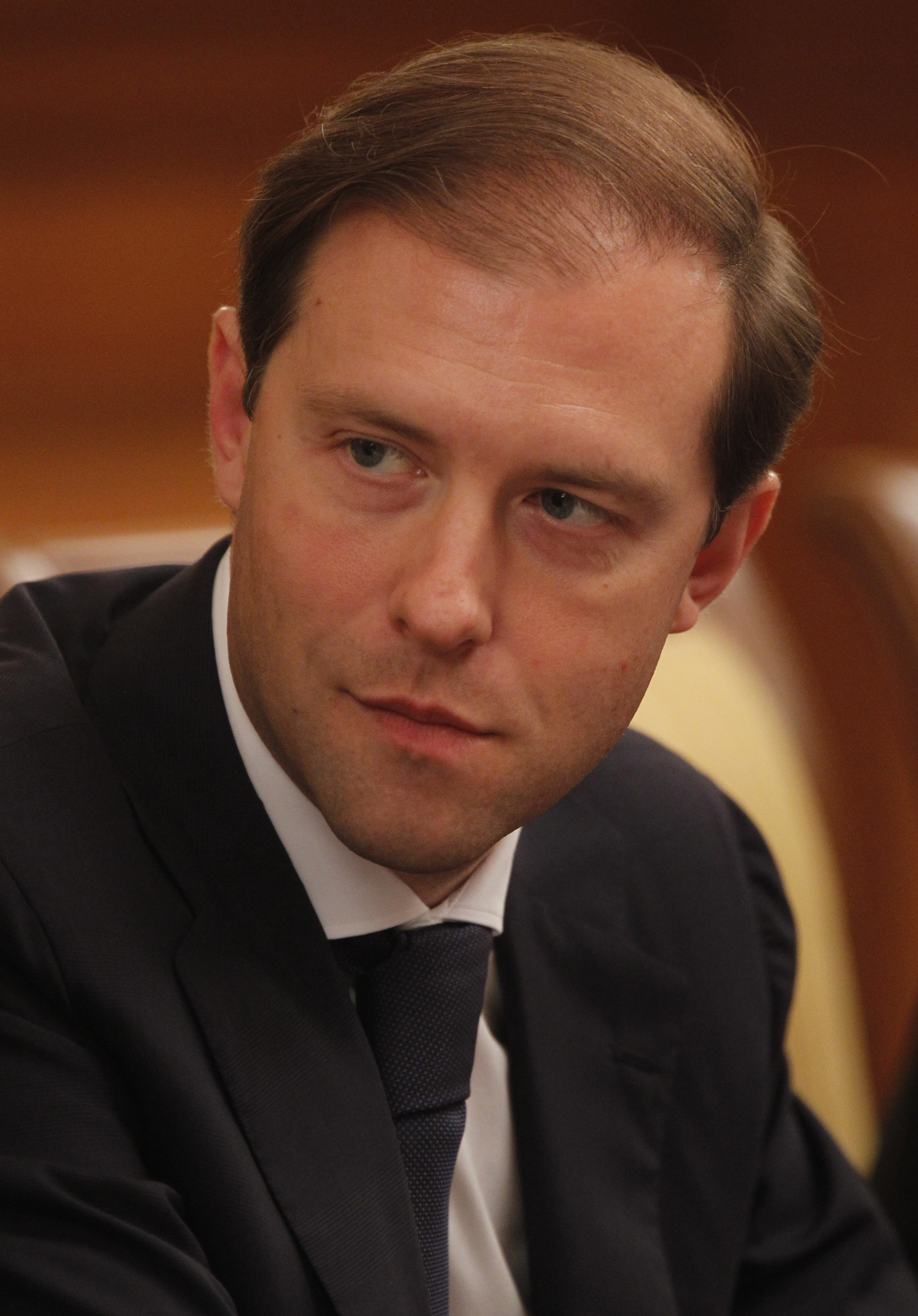
Denis Manturov, current chairman of the UAC since 2015

=== Board of directors ===
- Denis Manturov (Chairman since July 2015)
- Yury Slyusar (President since January 2015)
- Boris Alyoshin (Advisor to the President of UAC on Science and Technology since May 2015)
- Vladimir Potapov (Independent Director since June 2017)
- Yury Borisov
- Valery Okulov
- Andrey Ivanov
- Evgeniy Yelin
- Anatoly Serdyukov
- Ivan Kharchenko
- Evgeny Jurchenko

=== Chairman ===
- 2006–2015: Sergei Ivanov
- 2015–present: Denis Manturov

=== President ===
According to the UAC, the president is the sole executive body of PJSC UAC with functions of the chairman of the management board. The president is empowered to decide all issues about the corporation's current activities, except for matters falling within the competence of the general shareholders' meeting, the board of directors, and the management board.

- Before January 2015: Alexei Fyodorov
- January 2015–present: Yury Slyusar

=== Management board ===
- President: Yury Slyusar
- Member: Demchenko Oleg Fedorovich

==== Vice presidents ====
- First Vice President: Alexander Tulyakov
- Vice President for State Defense Order and Service Support of State Aviation Aircraft: Alexander Bobryshev
- Vice President for special-purpose aviation: Sergey Gerasimov
- Vice President of Economics and Finance: Demidov Alexey
- Vice President for Security: Koval Artur
- Vice President of special purpose and strategic aviation: Konyukhov Alexander
- Vice President for Innovations: Sergey Korotkov
- Vice President of Civil Aviation: Vladislav Masalov
- Vice President for Military Aviation: Igor Ozar
- Vice President - Head of the Office: Alexander Skokov
- Vice President for Production: Sergey Yurasov
- Former member: Alexey Rogozin

== See also ==
- Aircraft industry of Russia
- Companies similar to the UAC
  - Airbus
  - Aviation Industry Corporation of China
  - Boeing
  - BAE Systems
  - Lockheed Martin
  - Russian Helicopters
- List of companies of Russia
