= Yakovlev Corporation =

Russian aircraft manufacturer

JSC Yakovlev Corporation
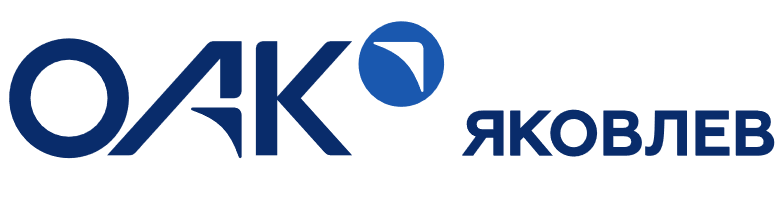
- Native name: AК Корпорация «Яковлев»
- Type: Subsidiary, Joint Stock Company
- Traded as: MCX: IRKT
- Industry: Aerospace and Defense
- Founded: 28 March 1932; 94 years ago
- Fate: merged into United Aircraft Corporation
- Headquarters: Moscow, Russia
- Key people: Andrey Boginsky, General Director
- Products: see products Components for the Airbus A320 family aircraft
- Revenue: $1.45 billion (2017)
- Operating income: $132 million (2017)
- Net income: $51.9 million (2017)
- Total assets: $2.83 billion (2017)
- Total equity: $408 million (2017)
- Number of employees: Over 14,000
- Parent: United Aircraft Corporation
- Subsidiaries: Yakovlev Design Bureau; Irkutsk Aviation Plant; BETA AIR; Regional Aircraft
- Website: eng.yakovlev.ru

The JSC Yakovlev Corporation (MCX: IRKT) (Russian: Яковлев) is a Russian aircraft manufacturer, headquartered in the Aeroport District, Northern Administrative Okrug, Moscow. It is the manufacturer of the Sukhoi Su-30 family of interceptor/ground-attack aircraft. The company was founded in 1932 in the Transbaykal region of the Soviet Union as the Irkutsk Aviation Plant (IAP). It was formerly known as Irkut Corporation.

United Aircraft Corporation was formed in 2006 from the merger of Mikoyan, Ilyushin, Sukhoi, Tupolev, and Yakovlev.

== History ==
=== Soviet era (1932–1993) ===
On 28 March 1932, the Irkutsk Aviation Plant (IAP) was established under order No. 181 by the Main Directorate of the USSR People's Commissariat for Heavy Industry. On 18 August 1934, the form marking the completion of construction manufacturing plant for the new bureau was signed. The first aircraft manufactured by the IAP was the Tupolev I-14, which had its flight on 16 February 1935. The IAP later started mass production of the Tupolev SB Bomber in the spring of 1936. In July 1941, the IAP started delivery of Petlyakov Pe-2 dive bombers. From 1942, the IAP started mass production of two long-range bomber aircraft: Ilyushin Il-4 and Yermolayev Yer-2 until 1945, probably for the Soviet Air Forces for World War II. From 1946, the IAP started production of the Tupolev Tu-2 tactical bomber until 1949. From 1950, the IAP started mass production of two bomber aircraft, the Tupolev Tu-14 and the Ilyushin Il-28 until 1956. In 1957, the IAP renovated itself and started production of the Antonov An-12 military transport aircraft. From 1960, the IAP started mass production of the supersonic bomber and reconnaissance aircraft, the Yakovlev Yak-28 until 1972. From 1967, the IAP started mass production of the Antonov An-24 military transport aircraft until 1971. From 1970, the IAP started mass production of the fighter-bombers, the Mikoyan MiG-23UB and the Mikoyan MiG-27 until 1986. In 1982, IAP specialists started organization of Mikoyan MiG-27 licensed production in India. The Sukhoi Su-27UB, produced by the IAP as a two-seat operational conversion trainer, had its maiden flight on 10 September 1986. The first Sukhoi Su-30 developed by the aviation plant had its first flight on 14 April 1992.

=== Russian Federation era (1993–present) ===
On 30 December 1996, a contract was signed between the IAP and the Indian Air Force (IAF) for the delivery of the Sukhoi Su-30MKI to the IAF. The first Beriev Be-200, an amphibious aircraft, developed by the IAP, had its first flight on 24 September 1998. On 27 December 2002, the Irkutsk Aviation Production Association renamed themselves as the Irkut Corporation. The Irkut Corporation became the first Russian defence firm to carry out an initial public offering in March 2004. It traded 23.3% of the corporation's shares in the stock market. In the same year, the Irkut Corporation had integrated the Yakovlev Design Bureau into its corporate structure, making it a subsidiary.

On 20 December 2004 the company signed a contract with Airbus to produce components for the Airbus A320 family aircraft (the nose landing gear bay, keel beam, flap track and a floor grid section). As a result EADS owned a 10% stake in Irkut which it planned as of 2007 to convert into United Aircraft Corporation shares.

In 2006, the Russian government merged Irkut with Ilyushin, Mikoyan, Sukhoi, Tupolev and Yakovlev as a new company called United Aircraft Corporation.

In 2007 the company entered into a joint venture with Indian military aircraft manufacturer HAL to manufacture the UAC/HAL Il-214, which will be designed by Ilyushin. In July 2007, the company was selected as a head contractor for MC-21 short/mid range airliner program. The MC-21 would be the first aircraft the Irkut Corporation had designed. Production of the aircraft would start in 2014.

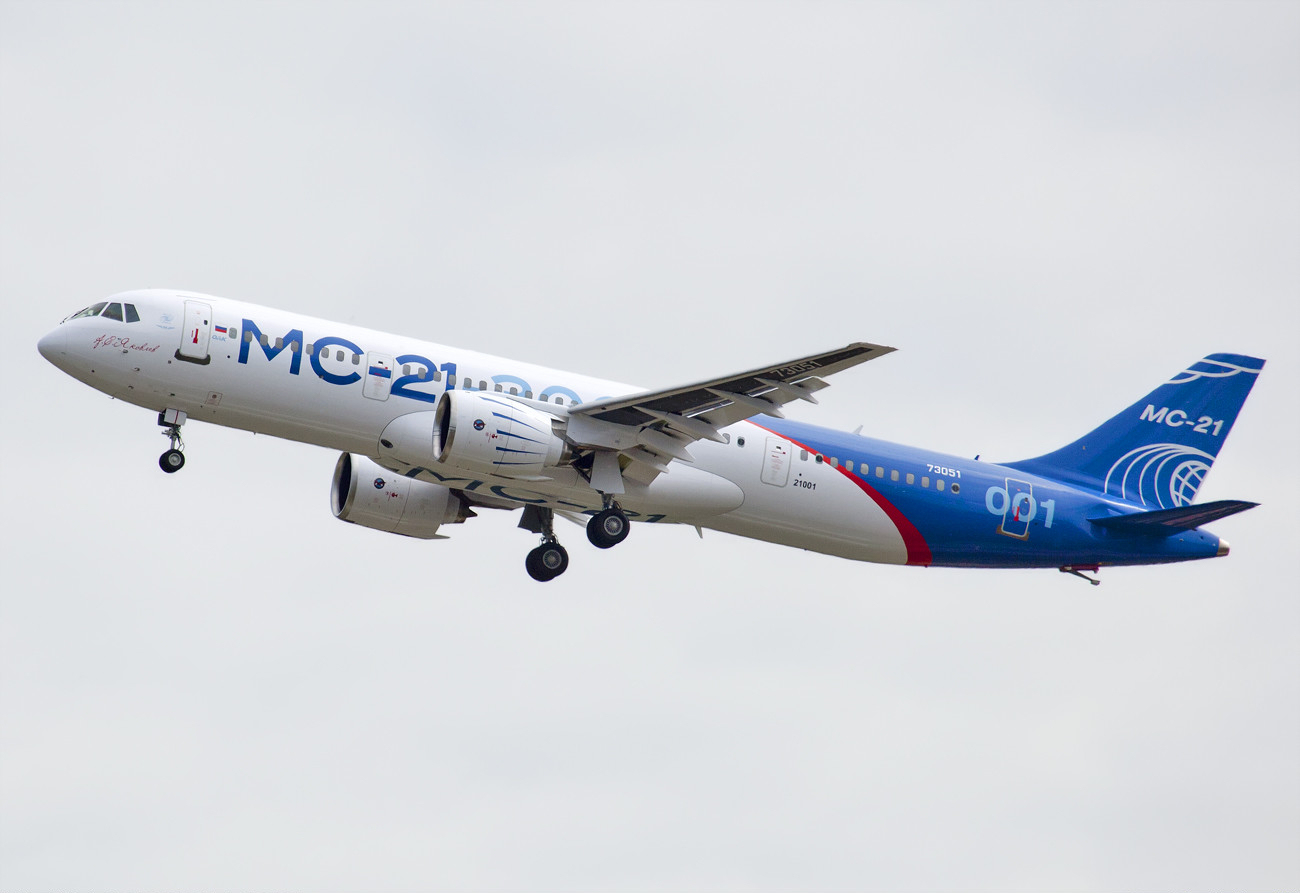
MC-21

In 2009, Irkut became the first on the Russian market to receive the EN 9100 norm certification for quality control management. This certificate allowed the Irkut to put its products on the European market.

In June 2011 the joint venture project with EADS to convert old A320 passenger aircraft to freighter mode was terminated because of increased demand for the precursor products.

In December 2016 the joint venture project to build and market a seaplane based on the Beriev Be-200 firefighter with EADS-Airbus was terminated.

==== 2018 integration of Sukhoi Civil Aircraft into the Irkut Corporation ====
At the end of November 2018, United Aircraft Corporation transferred SCAC from Sukhoi to the Irkut Corporation, to become UAC's airliner division, as Leonardo S.p.A. pulled out in early 2017 because of Superjet's poor financial performance.

The company manages the Superjet 100, the MC-21 and the Russo-Chinese CR929 widebody, but the Il-114 passenger turboprop and modernized Ilyushin Il-96-400 widebody stay with Ilyushin.

The new commercial division will also include the Yakovlev Design Bureau, avionics specialist UAC—Integration Center and composite manufacturer AeroComposit.

==== 2023 rebranding as Yakovlev ====
In August 2023, Irkut rebranded itself as Yakovlev. The Sukhoi Superjet 100 was redesignated as the SJ-100, and the Irkut MC-21 also adopted the Yakovlev name.

==== Sanctions ====
In June 2022, the company was designated by the United States pursuant to Executive Order 14024 for operating or having operated in the defence and related materiel sector and the aerospace sector of the Russian Federation economy. Irkut has also been sanctioned by Canada, New Zealand, and Switzerland.

In January 2023, Japan imposed sanctions on the company.

In January 2024, a report was published on how Yakovlev evaded sanctions to continue to procure components from US firms like Honeywell, through a European intermediary.

== Products ==
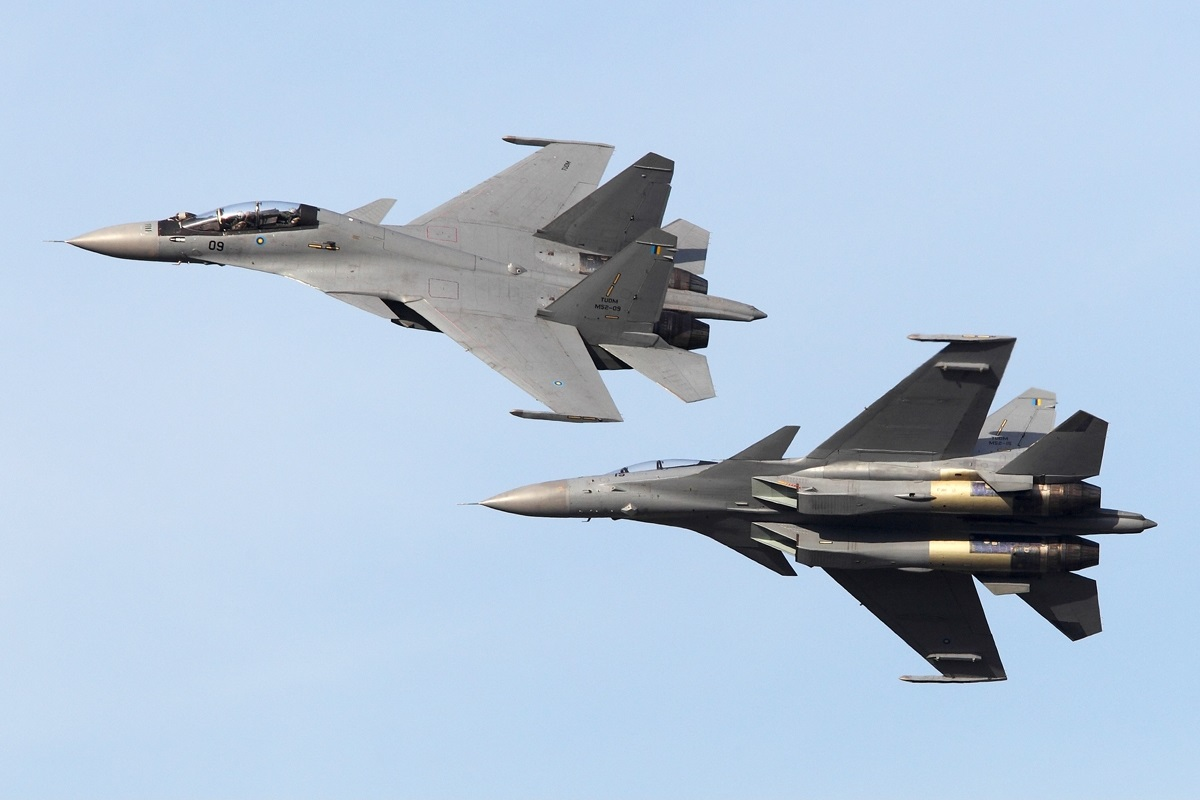
Su-30MKM produced by Irkut

=== Manufactured products ===
Products manufactured by the company are:

Aircraft	Type	Description	Designer	Maiden Flight	Introduction	Production Starts	Production Ends
Tupolev I-14	fighter aircraft		Tupolev	27 May 1933	1935	1935	1935
Tupolev SB	medium bomber		Tupolev	7 October 1934	1936	Spring of 1936	1941
Petlyakov Pe-2	dive bomber		Petlyakov	22 December 1939	1941	1939	1954
Ilyushin Il-4	torpedo bomber		Ilyushin Aviation Complex	31 March 1936	1942	1942	1945
Yermolayev Yer-2	medium bomber		Yermolayev OKB	14 May 1940	1941	1942	1945
Tupolev Tu-2	tactical bomber		Tupolev			1946	1949
Tupolev Tu-14			Tupolev			1950	1956
Ilyushin Il-28			Ilyushin Aviation Complex			1950	1956
Antonov An-12			Antonov			1957	1973
Antonov An-24			Antonov			1967	1971
Mikoyan MiG-23UB			Mikoyan			1970	1986
Mikoyan MiG-27			Mikoyan			1970	1986
Sukhoi Su-27UB			Sukhoi Design Bureau	10 September 1986	1986	1986	–
Sukhoi Su-30	multirole fighter	twinjet, twin-seat	Sukhoi Design Bureau	31 December 1989	1996	1992	–
Sukhoi Su-30SM	multirole fighter	twinjet, twin-seat	Sukhoi Design Bureau	1993	1993	1993	–
Beriev Be-200			Beriev				
Sukhoi Su-30MK	multirole fighter	twinjet, twin-seat	Sukhoi Design Bureau	21 September 2012	2016	2012	–
Yakovlev SJ-100 (formerly Sukhoi Superjet 100)	jet airliner	narrow-body, twinjet	Sukhoi Design Bureau	19 May 2008	2011	2007	–

=== Designed products ===
These products are designed by the Irkut Corporation and its branches.

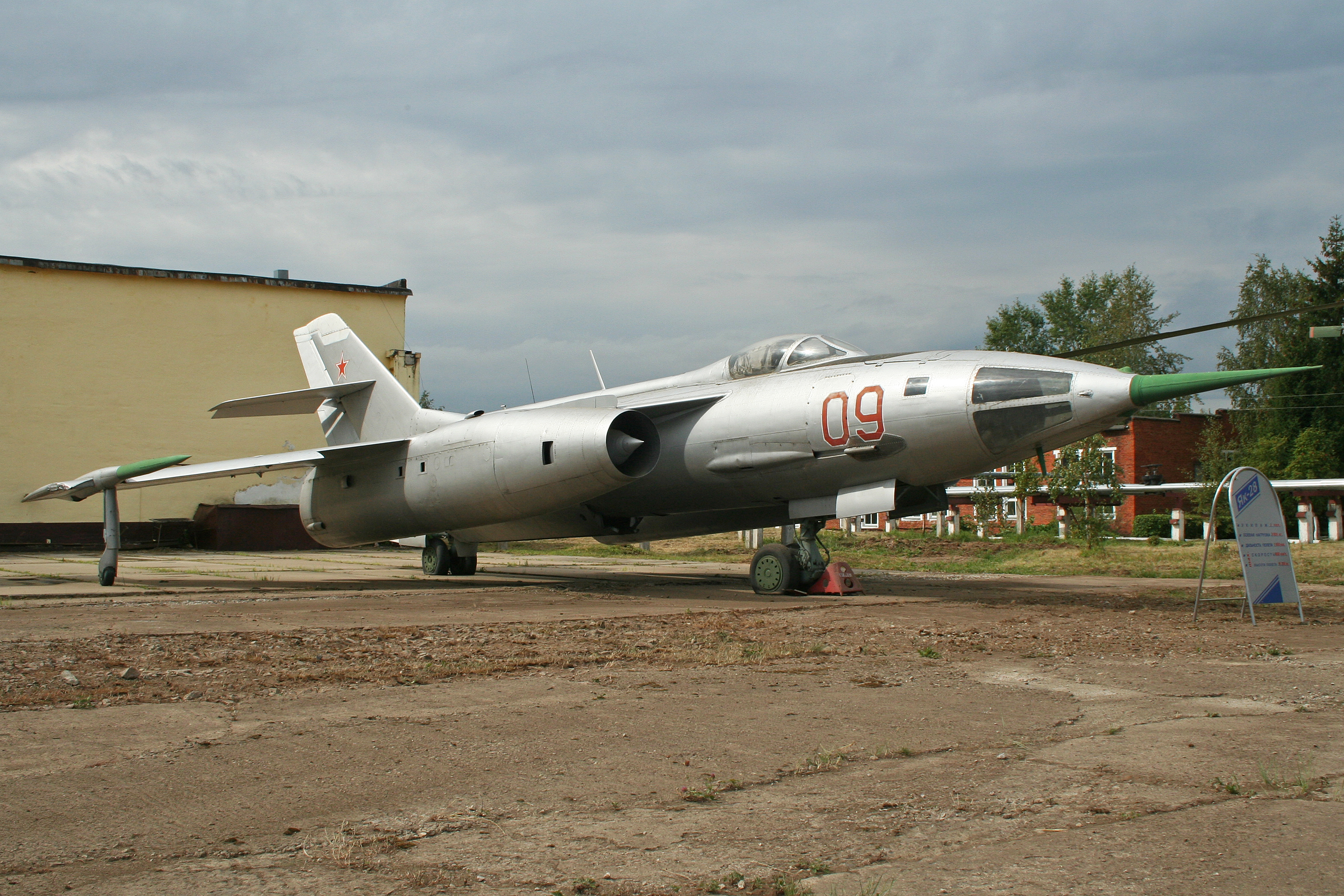
Yak-28

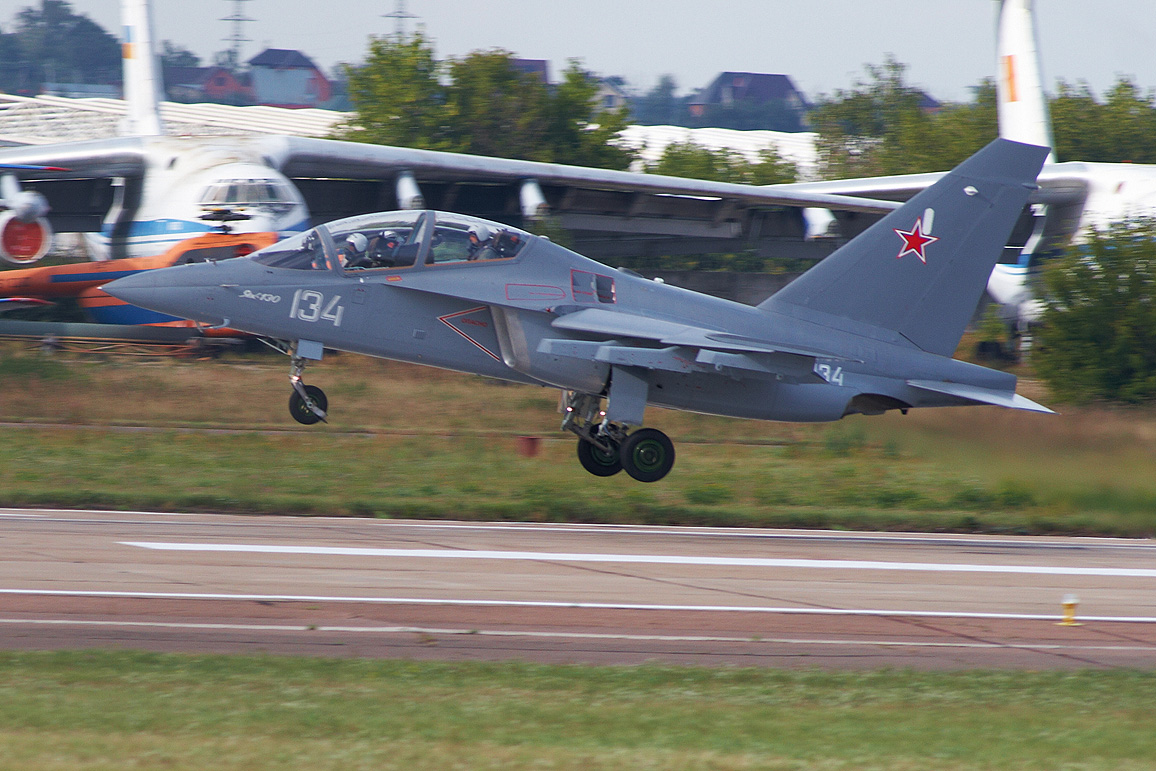
Yak-130

Aircraft	Type	Description	Designer	Maiden Flight	Introduction
Yakovlev Yak-28			Yakovlev Design Bureau		
Yakovlev Yak-130	advanced trainer, light fighter	twinjet, twin-seat	Yakovlev Design Bureau	25 April 1996	19 February 2010
Yakovlev Yak-152	trainer aircraft	single-seat	Yakovlev Design Bureau	29 September 2016	Planned for 2017
Yakovlev MC-21	jet airliner	narrow-body, twinjet	Irkut Corporation, Yakovlev Design Bureau	28 May 2017	delayed to 2026
