= Yeltsovka Airport =

Airport in Russia

Yeltsovka Airport Аэропорт Ельцовка
- IATA: none; ICAO: UNNE; LID: НВЦ

Summary
- Airport type: Public
- Operator: NAPO
- Location: Novosibirsk
- Elevation AMSL: 617 ft / 188 m
- Coordinates: 55°5′30″N 83°0′30″E
- Interactive map of Yeltsovka Airport; Аэропорт Ельцовка

Runways
Direction	Length		Surface
Direction	ft	m	Surface
01/19	10,991	3,350	Concrete

Yeltsovka Airport (Russian: Аэропорт Ельцовка) (ICAO: UNNE) is an airport in Novosibirsk Oblast, Russia located 8 km northeast of Novosibirsk. It is a large airfield on the northeast side of Novosibirsk with tarmac space. Currently, the airport has the ability to handle up to 1.5 million passengers a year. It handles Ilyushin Il-76 traffic, and an Antonov factory and government experimental facilities are present.

== See also ==
- List of airports in Russia
