= Tupolev I-14 =

1930s Soviet fighter aircraft

I-14 / ANT-31
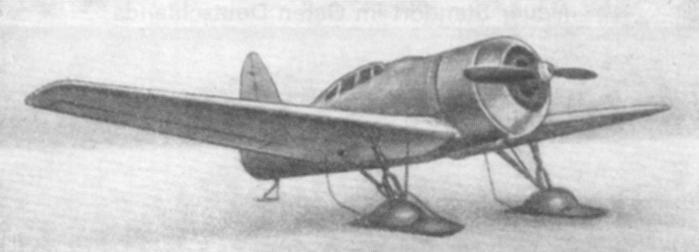

General information
- Type: Fighter
- National origin: Soviet Union
- Manufacturer: Tupolev
- Primary user: Soviet Air Force
- Number built: 20

History
- Introduction date: 1935
- First flight: 27 May 1933

The Tupolev I-14 (also designated ANT-31) was a Soviet fighter aircraft of the 1930s. It was a single-engined, single-seat monoplane with retractable undercarriage, designed to carry heavy armament, and as such was one of the most advanced fighters of its time. It was ordered into production, but this was cancelled after only a small number had been built, the competing Polikarpov I-16 being preferred.

== Development and design ==
In 1932, the Soviet Air Force developed a requirement for a high-speed monoplane fighter to serve alongside agile but slower biplane fighters. In order to meet this requirement, the Tupolev design bureau assigned a team led by Pavel Sukhoi. Sukhoi's team produced the ANT-31, a low-wing monoplane with an unbraced cantilever wing, retractable undercarriage, an enclosed cockpit and heavy cannon armament.

The aircraft had a metal monocoque fuselage, while the wings were of corrugated metal construction. The mainwheels of the conventional landing gear retracted backwards into the wing, being operated by cables driven by a handwheel turned by the pilot. The first prototype was powered by an imported 433 kW (580 hp) Bristol Mercury radial engine enclosed by an NACA cowling and driving a two-bladed wooden propeller. It was armed with a single PV-1 machine gun, with provision for two Kurchevsky APK-37 recoilless autocannon under the wing.

The ANT-31, given the air force designation I-14 (Istrebitel – fighter), made its maiden flight on 27 May 1933. It proved agile but difficult to handle, and with the supercharged Mercury was underpowered, particularly at low altitude. It was therefore decided to build a second prototype, the I-14bis (also known as the ANT-31bis and the I-142 with a more powerful (531 kW (712 kp) Wright Cyclone engine, also imported, an uncorrugated wing and a new undercarriage. The I-14bis demonstrated excellent performance, although handling was still difficult, and an order was placed for production of 55 aircraft, to be powered by the Shvetsov M-25, a licensed version of the Cyclone, with an armament of two 45 mm (1.8 in) Kurchevsky APK-11 recoilless cannons and two ShKAS machine guns.

== Operational history ==
Deliveries began from the GAZ-125 factory at Irkutsk, Siberia in November 1936. The aircraft's armament had changed to a single ShKAS machine gun and a 20 mm ShVAK cannon as Kurchevsky's recoilless guns had fallen out of favour (with Kurchevsky himself soon to be arrested). By this time, the rival Polikarpov I-16 fighter was well established in production and service, and production of the I-14 was stopped after 18 had been built, the type soon being phased out of service.

== Operators ==
Soviet Union

- Soviet Air Force

== Specifications (production I-14) ==
Data from Tupolev: The Man and His Aircraft

General characteristics

- Crew: one
- Length: 6.11 m (20 ft 1 in)
- Wingspan: 11.25 m (36 ft 11 in)
- Height: 3.14 m (10 ft 4 in)
- Wing area: 16.8 m^{2} (181 sq ft)
- Empty weight: 1,170 kg (2,579 lb)
- Gross weight: 1,540 kg (3,395 lb)
- Powerplant: 1 × Shvetsov M-25 9-cylinder air-cooled radial engine, 521.8 kW (699.7 hp)

Performance

- Maximum speed: 449 km/h (279 mph, 242 kn)
- Range: 1,050 km (650 mi, 570 nmi)
- Service ceiling: 9,430 m (30,940 ft)
- Time to altitude: 6.5 min to 5,000 m (16,400 ft)

Armament

- Guns: 1× 7.62 mm (0.30 in) ShKAS machine gun and 1× 20 mm (0.79 in) ShVAK cannon

== See also ==
Aircraft of comparable role, configuration, and era

- Polikarpov I-16
- Grigorovich IP-1
