= KB SAT SR-10 =

Russian single-engine jet trainer aircraft

SR-10
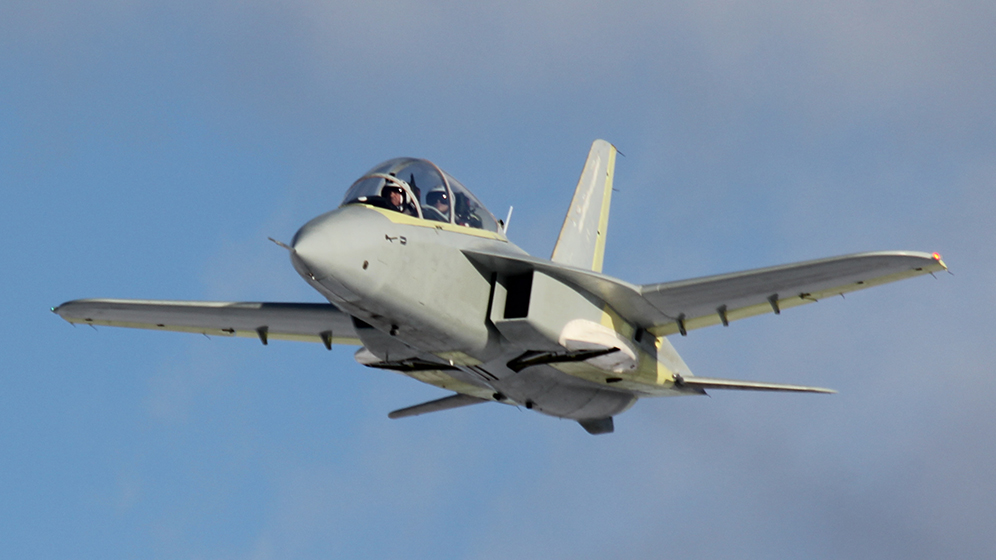
- First prototype of SR-10 during the flight

General information
- Type: Training aircraft
- National origin: Russia
- Manufacturer: KB SAT, Aviaaggregat, Smolensk SmAZ, KTRV
- Designer: KB SAT
- Number built: 1

History
- First flight: 25 December 2015

The KB SAT SR-10 is a prototype Russian single-engine jet trainer aircraft, fitted with forward-swept wings. It first flew in 2015 and is being offered to the Russian Air Force and for export.

== Design and development ==
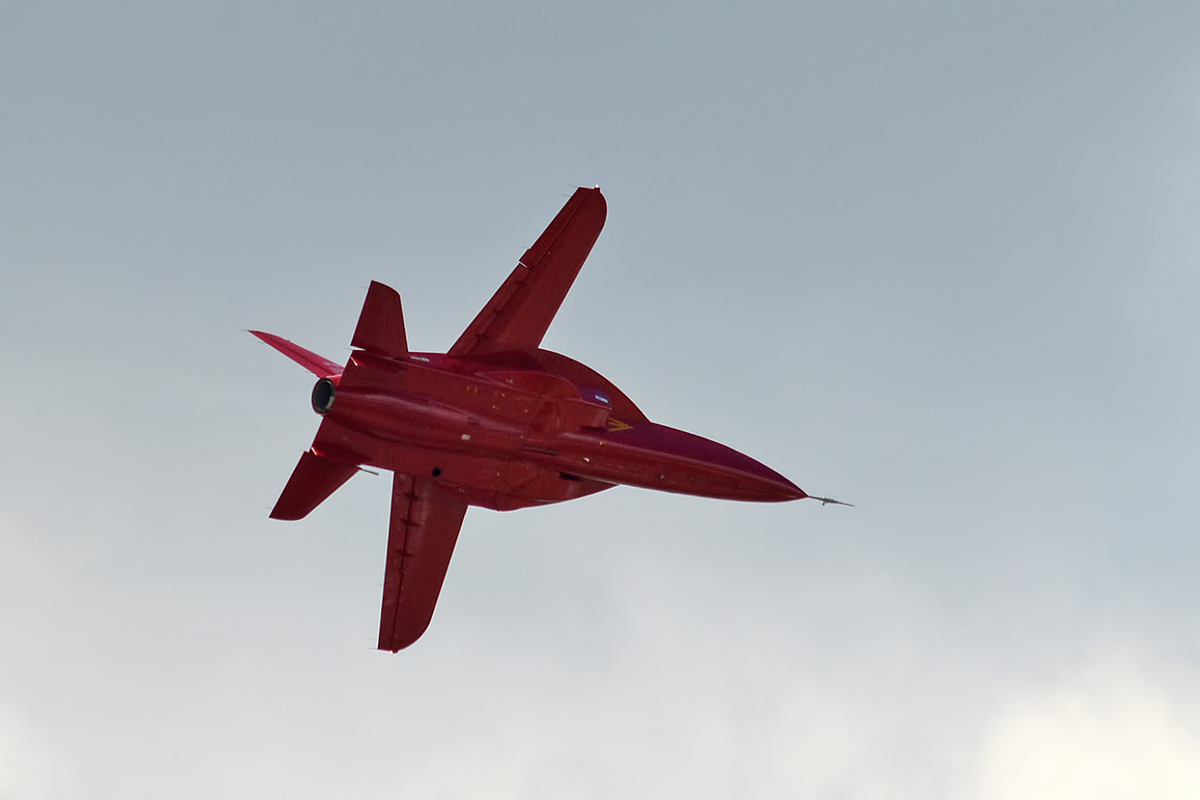
An SR-10 in flight

The Russian design bureau KB SAT (Sovremyenne Aviatsyonne Tekhnologii – Modern Aircraft Technologies) began work on a single-engine jet trainer and sport aircraft, the SR-10, in 2007, displaying a mockup at the MAKS airshow at Zhukovsky in August 2009. The SR-10 is a mid-wing monoplane of all-composite construction, with a wing swept forward at an angle of 10 degrees. The crew of two sit in a tandem cockpit. It is powered by a single turbofan, with an Ivchenko AI-25V AI25TSR (modification of AI25TL) fitted in the prototype, but more modern Russian engines, such as the NPO Saturn AL-55 were proposed for production aircraft.

The SR-10 was offered to meet a 2014 requirement for a basic trainer for the Russian Air force, but was rejected in favour of the Yakovlev Yak-152, a piston-engined trainer. Despite this setback, KB SAT continued to develop the SR-10, proposing it as an intermediate trainer between the Yak-152 and the Yak-130 advanced jet trainer and for export. The first prototype SR-10 made its maiden flight on 25 December 2015.

In July 2017, KB SAT announced that it had developed an unmanned variant of the aircraft named the AR-10 Argument.

In September 2018, according to media reports, the Russian government failed to allocate funds to start production of SR-10 for the Russian Air Force and as a result KB SAT suspended all work on the project.

On September 19 2020, the SR-10 took part in the "Russian Aviation Race", held at Oreshkovo airfield in Kaluga Oblast.

== Specifications (SR-10) ==
Data from Russia's New Jet Trainer

General characteristics

- Crew: 2
- Length: 9.59 m (31 ft 6 in)
- Wingspan: 8.40 m (27 ft 7 in)
- Height: 3.55 m (11 ft 8 in)
- Gross weight: 2,400 kg (5,291 lb)
- Max takeoff weight: 2,700 kg (5,952 lb)
- Powerplant: 1 × Ivchenko AI-25V turbofan, 16.87 kN (3,790 lbf) thrust

Performance

- Maximum speed: 900 km/h (560 mph, 490 kn)
- Cruise speed: 520 km/h (320 mph, 280 kn)
- Range: 1,500 km (930 mi, 810 nmi)
- Service ceiling: 6,000 m (20,000 ft)
- g limits: +10/−8
- Rate of climb: 60 m/s (12,000 ft/min)

== See also ==
Aircraft of comparable role, configuration, and era

- Yakovlev Yak-130
- Mikoyan MiG-AT
- Sukhoi S-54
- EADS Mako/HEAT
- Guizhou JL-9
- HAL HJT-36 Sitara
- HESA Shafaq
- Hongdu JL-8
- Hongdu L-15
- KAI T-50 Golden Eagle
