= Sukhoi S-54 =

Proposed light fighter aircraft

S-54
- Sketch of the S-54 in its original trainer form.

General information
- Type: trainer / light fighter
- National origin: Russian Federation
- Manufacturer: Sukhoi

The Sukhoi S-54 was a series of three closely related aircraft proposals; the S-54 trainer aircraft, S-55 light fighter designed for export, and the S-56 carrier-capable light fighter. All members of the family resemble the Sukhoi Su-27 in general form, or the Sukhoi Su-33 more closely, but built around a single Saturn AL-31 engine instead of two, and scaled down accordingly to a smaller layout. The design was offered to several potential customers, including South Africa and India, but was turned down. Development is apparently on hold, awaiting a launch customer.

== Design and development ==
=== Genesis ===
The project traces its origins to a 1990 requirement to replace the aging Aero L-39 jet trainers, which were reaching the end of their service lives. The Aero L-29 had originally been selected as a Warsaw Pact standard trainer in 1961, in preference to the Yak-30 and PZL TS-11 Iskra. It started to be replaced in 1974 by the greatly updated L-39, powered by the new Ivchenko AI-25 engine. By 1990 the Soviet Air Force had about 1,000 L-39s on force, when the new Czech Republic stated they would no longer be supplying spares.

The Soviet Air Force's commander-in-chief, Air Marshal Yefimov, issued a statement on the issue on 20 April 1990. On 25 June 1990 the first official RFP document was issued for the Uchebno-Trenirovochnyi Samolyot (UTS) program. Four companies responded with designs, the Mikoyan MiG-AT, Yakovlev Yak-130 (then known as the Yak-UTS), the Myasischev M-200 and the S-54. Most of these designs were typical trainers; they were built to be docile in handling, low cost in operation, and were essentially all-new in design.

Sukhoi decided to take a different approach, and develop a true high-performance design closer to a fighter than a trainer. Advances in aerodynamics and flight controls allowed even the most advanced fighters have docile handling suitable for transition training, while at the same time the older generation aircraft had handling so different from modern aircraft that it gave them limited utility. Given their extensive experience with upgraded versions of the original Su-27, Sukhoi chose to use much of this design in the new trainer. Versions with one AL-31 or two smaller engines were studied, with the single-engine version favoured throughout.

The design that emerged appeared to be a Su-33 with a fuselage plug removed behind the cockpit, giving it a cross-section similar to other advanced trainers of the era. The first design study, shown publicly not long afterwards, was upgraded and improved during 1992. A new version, with airframe enlarged by approximately 25 per cent, was revealed at 1996 Farnborough Air Show.

The Yak-130 eventually won the UTS contract, and Sukhoi started looking for other markets.

=== S-55 and S-56 ===
Sukhoi then modified the design to allow it to mount the same radar as the Su-27, the Phazotron Sokol. Shown in June 1997, the S-55 was a lighter, shorter-range fighter that complemented the Su-27 in the same way the F-16 complements the F-15. Designed as a low-cost fighter, primarily for export, the S-55 was nevertheless a very advanced design compared to similar fighters that were "up-converted" from trainers.

Sukhoi also produced the S-56, essentially an S-55 adapted for carrier use. The design was deliberately tailored for the Admiral Kuznetsov, and was designed to fit into a 10 by 3 by 3 meter space, making it one of the most compact naval fighters ever designed. The small size, especially vertically, opened the possibility of adding another internal deck between the two existing aircraft decks in the Kuznetsov, increasing the total number of fighters that could be carried by two to three times. The S-56 was also offered to the Indian Navy in 1999, but was not purchased.

== Specifications ==
General characteristics

- Crew: 1-2
- Length: 12.3 m (40 ft 4 in)
- Wingspan: 9.8 m (32 ft 2 in)
- Height: 4.47 m (14 ft 8 in)
- Wing area: 26.42 m^{2} (284.4 sq ft)
- Empty weight: 4,200 kg (9,259 lb)
- Max takeoff weight: 9,410 kg (20,745 lb)
- Powerplant: 1 × Saturn AL-31FL afterburning turbofan engine, 74.5 kN (16,700 lbf) thrust dry, 122.58 kN (27,560 lbf) with afterburner

Performance

- Maximum speed: 1,660 km/h (1,030 mph, 900 kn) / M1.56 at high altitude

1,200 km/h (750 mph; 650 kn) / M0.98 at sea level

- Range: 2,000 km (1,200 mi, 1,100 nmi) at altitude
- Service ceiling: 18,000 m (59,000 ft)
- g limits: +9
- Rate of climb: 230 m/s (45,000 ft/min)

Armament
(light fighter versions) a variety of bombs rockets and missiles on external hardpoints

== See also ==
Related development

- Sukhoi Su-27

Aircraft of comparable role, configuration, and era

- Mikoyan MiG-AT
- KB SAT SR-10
- Yakovlev Yak-130
- General Dynamics F-16
