= Mikoyan MiG-AT =

Russian military aircraft

MiG-AT
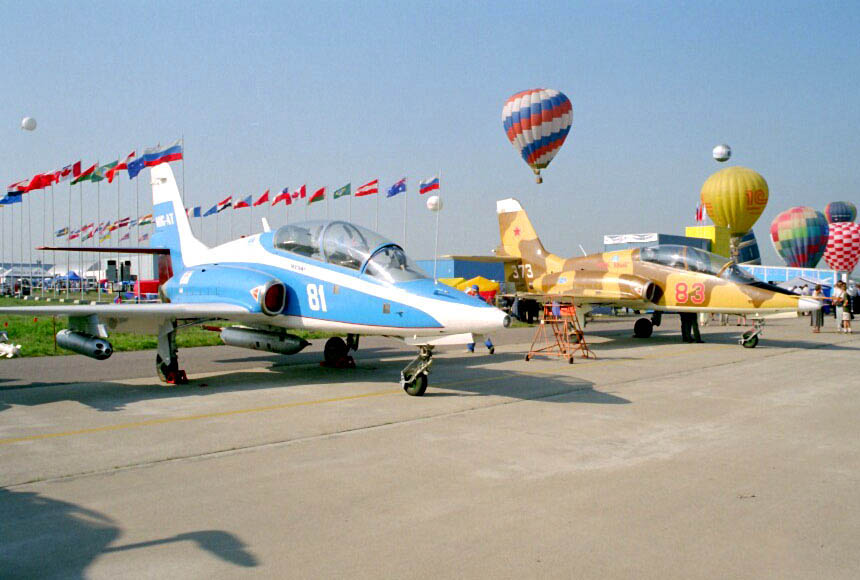
- MiG-AT "81" and "83"

General information
- Type: Advanced trainer / Light attack aircraft
- National origin: Russia
- Manufacturer: Moscow Aircraft Production Association
- Designer: Mikoyan Design Bureau
- Status: Cancelled
- Number built: 2

History
- First flight: 21 March 1996

The Mikoyan MiG-AT (Russian: МиГ-АТ) is a Russian advanced trainer and light attack aircraft that was intended to replace the Aero L-29 and L-39 of the Russian Air Force. Designed by the Mikoyan Design Bureau and built by the Moscow Aircraft Production Association, the MiG-AT made its first flight in March 1996. It is the first joint aircraft development programme between Russia and France and the first military collaborative project between Russia and the West to reach first flight. The design lost out to the Yakovlev Yak-130 in 2002 in the competition for a government contract, and had also been unsuccessfully marketed to countries such as India, Greece, and those of the Commonwealth of Independent States.

== Design and development ==
The design effort on the MiG-AT began when Soviet authorities looked to replace the country's ageing fleet of Aero L-29 and L-39 military trainer aircraft. The project competed with proposals from the design bureaus of Sukhoi, Myasishchev and Yakovlev; in 1992, the designs of the two former firms were eliminated, leaving the MiG-AT and Yak-130 as the sole contenders for a government contract. Due to the dissolution of the Soviet Union in 1991 and the subsequent fall in defence spending, Mikoyan entered into collaboration with French firms Snecma/Turbomeca and Sextant Avionique (later Thales Avionics), who would provide the aircraft engines and avionics, respectively.

Following the freezing of the MiG-AT's final design in early 1994, the Moscow Aircraft Production Association (MAPO) started fabricating the first prototype. The two companies, which would merge in 1995 to form MAPO-MiG, used their own funds for the construction of the aircraft. The first MiG-AT (81 White) was rolled out in May 1995, before it was transferred to Zhukovsky, where it made a short initial "hop" in early March 1996. Its official first flight, however, took place on 21 March 1996, when Roman Taskayev took the aircraft aloft for 45 minutes, accompanied by a MiG-29UB and an L-39 acting as chase planes. The aircraft reached a height of 1,200 m (4,000 ft) and a speed of 400 km/h (250 mph). The second prototype joined the flight test programme in October 1997; by then, the first aircraft had accumulated more than 200 test flights. Mikoyan had originally planned to conduct the test programme using three flying prototypes and a static aircraft and also to construct about fifteen additional aircraft for its joint international marketing effort with Snecma.

The MiG-AT is more conventional than the competing Yak-130. It has a low-set, straight wing, engines mounted on either side of the fuselage and a mid-mounted tail. The first aircraft had avionics that had been jointly developed by Sextant Avionique and GosNIIAS that was derived from prior French software. The avionics system comprised multi-function liquid crystal displays, a head-up display and other navigation systems, some of which used commercial technology to shorten development time. The avionics systems, when working with the MiG-AT's fly-by-wire flight-control system, allowed the aircraft to adopt the characteristics of third- and fourth-generation jet fighters. The second prototype differed from the first in having Russian avionics and hardpoints for the carriage of armament.

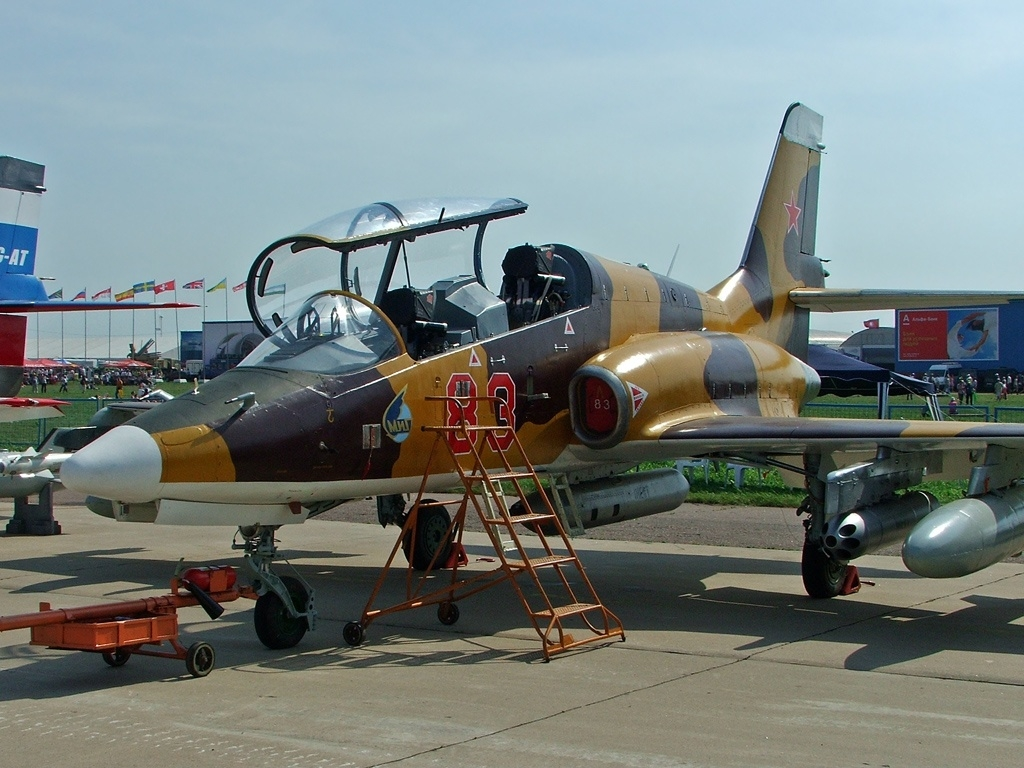
MiG-AT at MAKS-2007 airshow

The aircraft is powered by two Snecma-Turbomeca Larzac 04R20 turbofan engines, rated at 3,175 lbf (14.12 kN), that had been developed in the 1970s for the Alpha Jet. Under a 1995 agreement between French and Russian authorities, the Russian side reserved the right to locally produce and develop a higher thrust derivative of the engine. In November 1996, a contract was signed for the production of ten Larzac engines for the initial pre-production aircraft, which did not come into fruition. At the same time, the Soyuz Design Bureau was working on a Russian alternative to the Larzac, named the RD-1700, rated at 3,750 lbf (16.7 kN) at take-off. Both aircraft prototypes later served as a separate test beds for the RD-1700 and NPO Saturn AL-55I engine.

As the tender for a military trainer progressed, operational experience in the air force and pressure from foreign participating companies shifted the original requirements for a purely trainer aircraft to one that encompassed a light combat capability. In mid-March 2002, Commander-in-Chief Vladimir Mikhailov stated that the Yak-130 had been chosen over the MiG-AT as the air force's new trainers, only for the media to subsequently report that both aircraft had been chosen. The Yak-130, however, was said to be superior as it could serve the dual role of a trainer and combat jet, and in the end, on 10 April 2002, it was announced that the Yak-130 had indeed been selected over the MiG-AT. Mikoyan protested the decision, in particular the expanded requirements for a lightweight combat trainer, and the weapons load requirement that was apparently too great for such physically-inadequate designs. By then, the two prototypes had amassed 750 flights.

An aspect of the Mikoyan's original 1993 agreement with the French companies was that the latter would assist in the marketing of the MiG-AT outside the Commonwealth of Independent States (CIS). In particular, the agreement was intended to add credibility to the project, and to draw on Snecma's international business network. Aside from the CIS, Russia would market the aircraft to countries that had traditionally purchased the country's aircraft, including India and Malaysia. The aircraft was demonstrated to officials and pilots of such countries as Algeria, Greece, India and the United Arab Emirates. Despite the loss in 2002 to the Yakovlev design, Mikoyan proceeded with discussions with prospective overseas partners and continuing flight-test programme. In February 2004, the design received its Russian military certification, and it was expected that Algeria would be the first to place an order for the aircraft.

In June 2018, vice president of the United Aircraft Corporation Sergei Korotkov announced the Russian Defence Ministry is considering a revival of the program and possibility of using the aircraft as a main platform for base training of pilots. Further, it was reported by Viktor Bondarev if the decision is taken, the aircraft may be introduced to the Russian Air Force in 2023.

UAC announced in December 2023 that it plans to build a new training complex, the main element of which will be the new single-engine MiG-UTS aircraft, which is a spiritual successor of MiG-AT.

== Variants ==
- MiG-AT – two-seat basic military trainer variant.
- MiG-AC – proposed single-seat combat variant with shortened fuselage.
- MiG-ATC – proposed trainer/light combat variant of the baseline MiG-AT with helmet-mounted target designation system for air-to-air and air-to-ground operations.

== Specifications (MiG-AT) ==
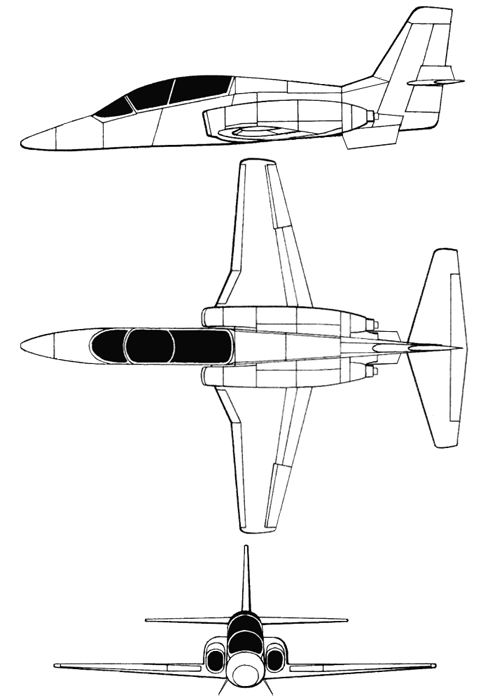

Data from Jane's All The World's Aircraft 2003–2004, airforce-technology.com,

General characteristics

- Crew: 2
- Length: 12.01 m (39 ft 5 in)
- Wingspan: 10.16 m (33 ft 4 in)
- Height: 4.42 m (14 ft 6 in)
- Wing area: 17.67 m^{2} (190.2 sq ft)
- Gross weight: 4,610 kg (10,163 lb) (training)
- Max takeoff weight: 7,800 kg (17,196 lb) (combat)
- Fuel capacity: 2,390 L (630 US gal; 530 imp gal)
- Powerplant: 2 × SNECMA Turbomeca Larzac 04-R-20 turbofan engines, 14.4 kN (3,200 lbf) thrust each

Performance

- Maximum speed: 1,000 km/h (620 mph, 540 kn) at 2,500 m (8,202 ft)
- Maximum speed: Mach 0.81
- Range: 1,200 km (750 mi, 650 nmi)
- Ferry range: 2,000 km (1,200 mi, 1,100 nmi)
- Service ceiling: 14,000 m (46,000 ft)
- g limits: +8
- Rate of climb: 81.7 m/s (16,080 ft/min)

Armament

- Guns: UPK-23 gun pod for Gryazev-Shipunov GSh-23 autocannon
- Hardpoints: 9 with a capacity of up to 2,000 kg (4,400 lb) of stores, with provisions to carry combinations of:
  - Rockets: *** UB-16 rocket pods for S-5 rockets
    - UB-8M rocket pods for S-8 rockets
  - Missiles: *** Air-to-air missiles:
      - R-73E
      - R-77
      - AIM-9L Sidewinder
      - R.550 Magic
    - Air-to-surface missiles:
      - Kh-29TD
    - Anti-ship missiles:
      - Kh-31AE
    - Anti-radiation missiles:
      - Kh-31PE
    - Anti-tank missiles:
      - 9K121 Vikhr
  - Bombs: up to 500 kg (1,100 lb) bombs

== See also ==
Aircraft of comparable role, configuration, and era

- EADS Mako/HEAT
- Hongdu L-15
- HAL HJT-36 Yashas
- Sukhoi S-54 – although single-engined it was entered into the same UTS (new generation jet trainer) design competition
- Yakovlev Yak-130 – selected UTS design
- KB SAT SR-10 - a competing single-engine light trainer from the KB SAT design bureau
