= Ivchenko AI-25 =

Turbofan engine family by Ivchenko

AI-25
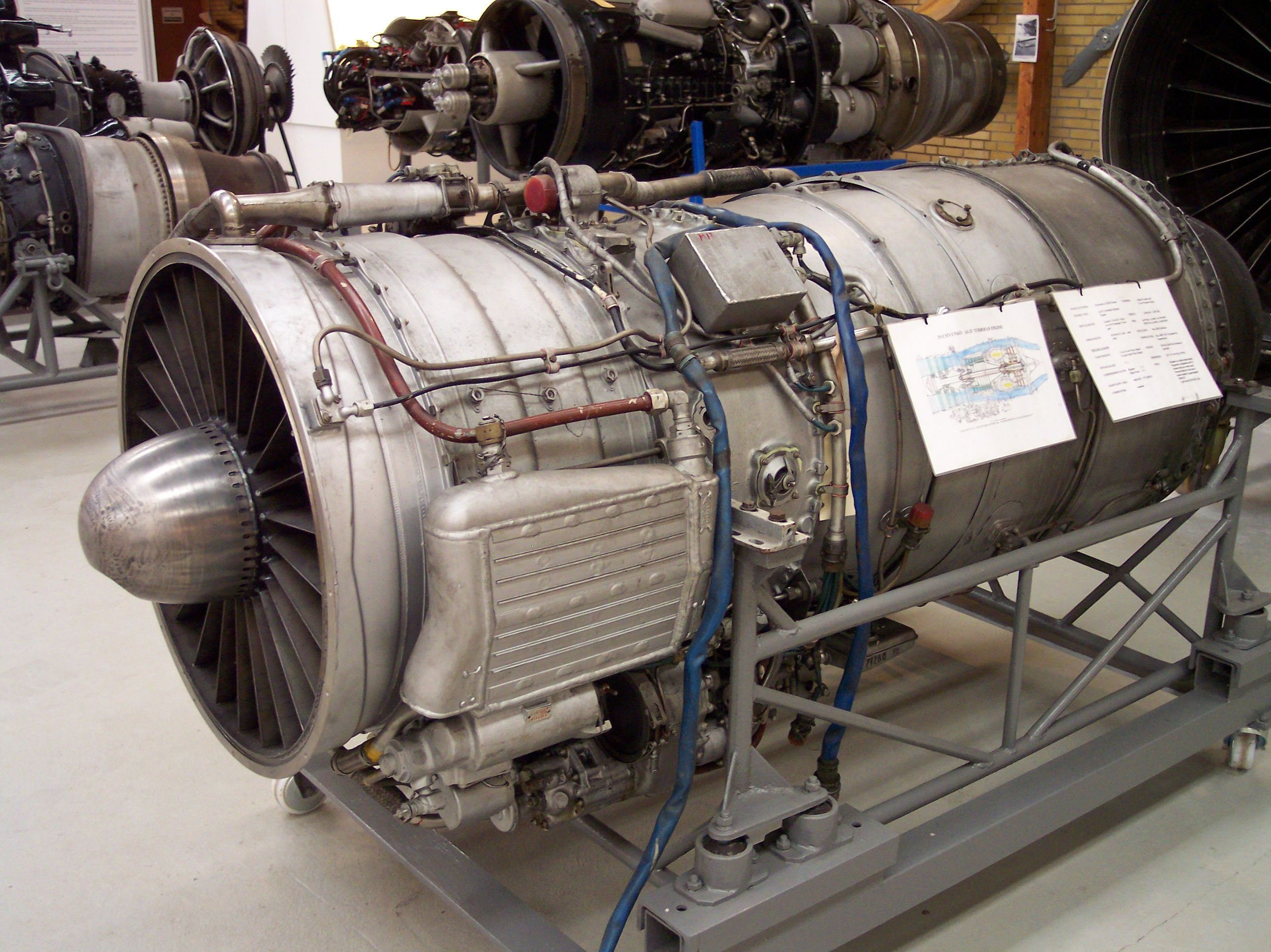
- Ivchenko-Progress AI-25 turbofan engine
- Type: Medium Bypass Turbofan
- National origin: Soviet Union
- Manufacturer: Ivchenko-Progress
- First run: 1966
- Major applications: Aero L-39 Albatros; Hongdu JL-8; FP-5 Flamingo; Yakovlev Yak-40; PZL M-15 Belphegor; Bayraktar Kızılelma
- Number built: 9,360+
- Developed into: DV-2

The Ivchenko AI-25 (Russian: Ивченко АИ-25) is a family of twin-shaft medium bypass turbofan engines for military and civilian aircraft use developed by Ivchenko OKB of the Soviet Union. It was the first bypass engine used on short haul aircraft in the USSR. The engine is still produced by Ukrainian aircraft engine manufacturing company Motor Sich.

== Development ==
The AI-25 was designed to power the Yakovlev Yak-40 tri-jet airliner, often called the first regional jet transport aircraft, and is the starting point for the Lotarev DV-2 turbofan engine. The project was launched in 1965, with the AI-25s first test flight in 1966, and finally cleared for production in 1967. In 1972, the AI-25 was selected for the Polish PZL M-15 Belphegor, the world's only jet-powered biplane.

Development of the AI-25 continued and the uprated AI-25TL was designed for use by the Czechoslovak Aero L-39 Albatros military trainer with the first flight occurring in 1968. The L-39, would go on to become one of the most popular, and widespread trainer aircraft in the world, with over 3,000 L-39s produced, and with 2,900 examples still in active service today. A smaller version of the AI-25TL, the AI-25TLK has equipped the People's Republic of China Hongdu L-11 fighter-trainer.

The AI-25TLK is also licensed built in the People's Republic of China as the WS-11. Another variant of the AI-25, is the AI-25TLSh in the 1990s, which underwent flight testing by the Ukrainian Ministry of Defense in 2002. Ivchenko-Progress is currently marketing the AI-25TLSh as an upgrade to existing L-39 and JL-8 operators that would extend the service life of the aircraft and improve performance. The latest AI-25 is the AI-25TL Series 2 designed for the Mikoyan MiG-AT.

For the demand of a stronger turbofan engine by Turkey for its jet-powered Bayraktar MIUS UAV the Ukrainian company developed the stronger AI-25TLT variant

=== Usage in FP-5 Flamingo missile ===
Ukrainian company Fire Point had obtained a large number of Ivchenko AI-25, purchased from various stockpiles and found in landfills and dumps, for powering the FP-5 Flamingo cruise missile. Many had a remaining flight time of some 10 hours. As the engines will not be used for multiple flights by jet aircraft, Fire Point restores them just enough for a Flamingo missile's flight time of three and a half hours. Media reports had said that the engines were made by Motor Sich, but Fire Point said that they had found "thousands of such engines" at various landfills in Ukraine. These engines, in order to keep costs down, have had their titanium parts replaced by "cheaper and easier-to-produce alternatives" to make them flightworthy. Some six thousand of these engines are still in use in aircraft such as the L-39 Albatross and Hongdu JL-8 jet trainers in "post-Soviet countries, Asia, and Africa". Fire Point has also established its own plant to produce engines for the missiles; it is not clear whether this is the Ivchenko AI-25 under licence.

== Variants ==
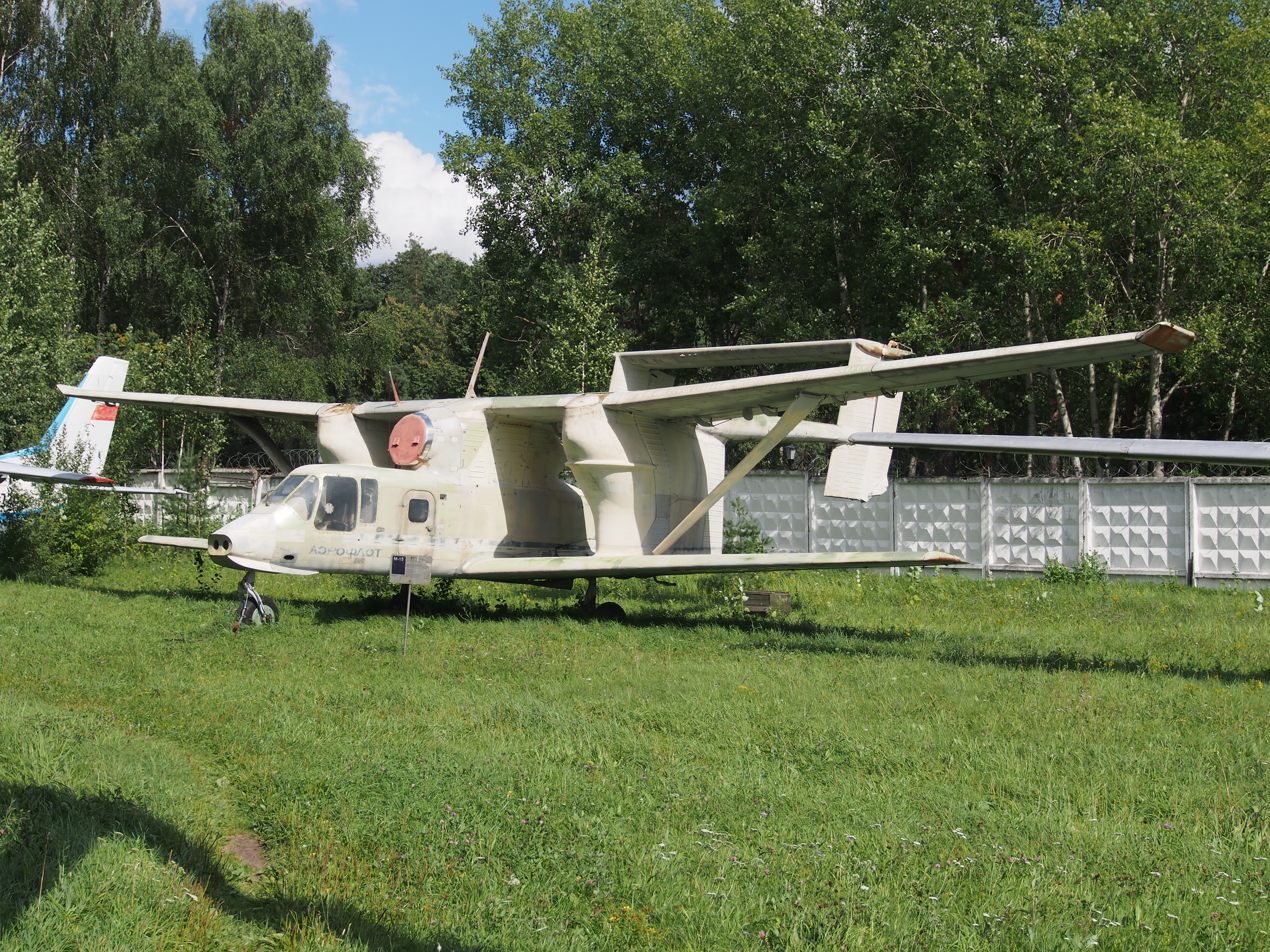
M-15 powered by AI-25 turbofan engine

AI-25
AI-25A
AI-25TL
AI-25TL series 2
AI-25TLT
(Black Sea Shield - turbofan) The AI-25TLT licence-built by Turkish-Ukrainian joint venture BSS based in Istanbul for the Bayraktar MIUS unmanned fighter aircraft
AI-25TLK
AI-25TLSh
AI-25W
AI-25WM
WS-11
(WoShan - turbofan) The AI-25TLK licence-built in China for the Hongdu L-11
Walter Titan
(AI-25WM)
Walter Sirius

== Applications ==
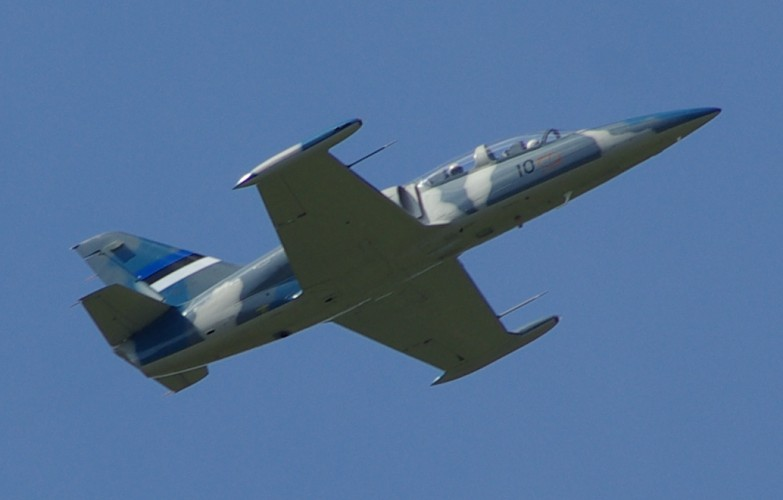
An Estonian L-39 Albatros in flight powered by an AI-25TL turbofan engine

- Aero L-39 Albatros – (Czechoslovakia)
- Comp Air Jet – (United States)
- Hongdu JL-8 – (China, Pakistan)
- PZL M-15 Belphegor – (Poland)
- Yakovlev Yak-40 – (Soviet Union)
- KB SAT SR-10 – (Russia)
- Bayraktar MIUS – (Turkey)
- FP-5 Flamingo – (Ukraine)

== Specifications (AI-25TL) ==
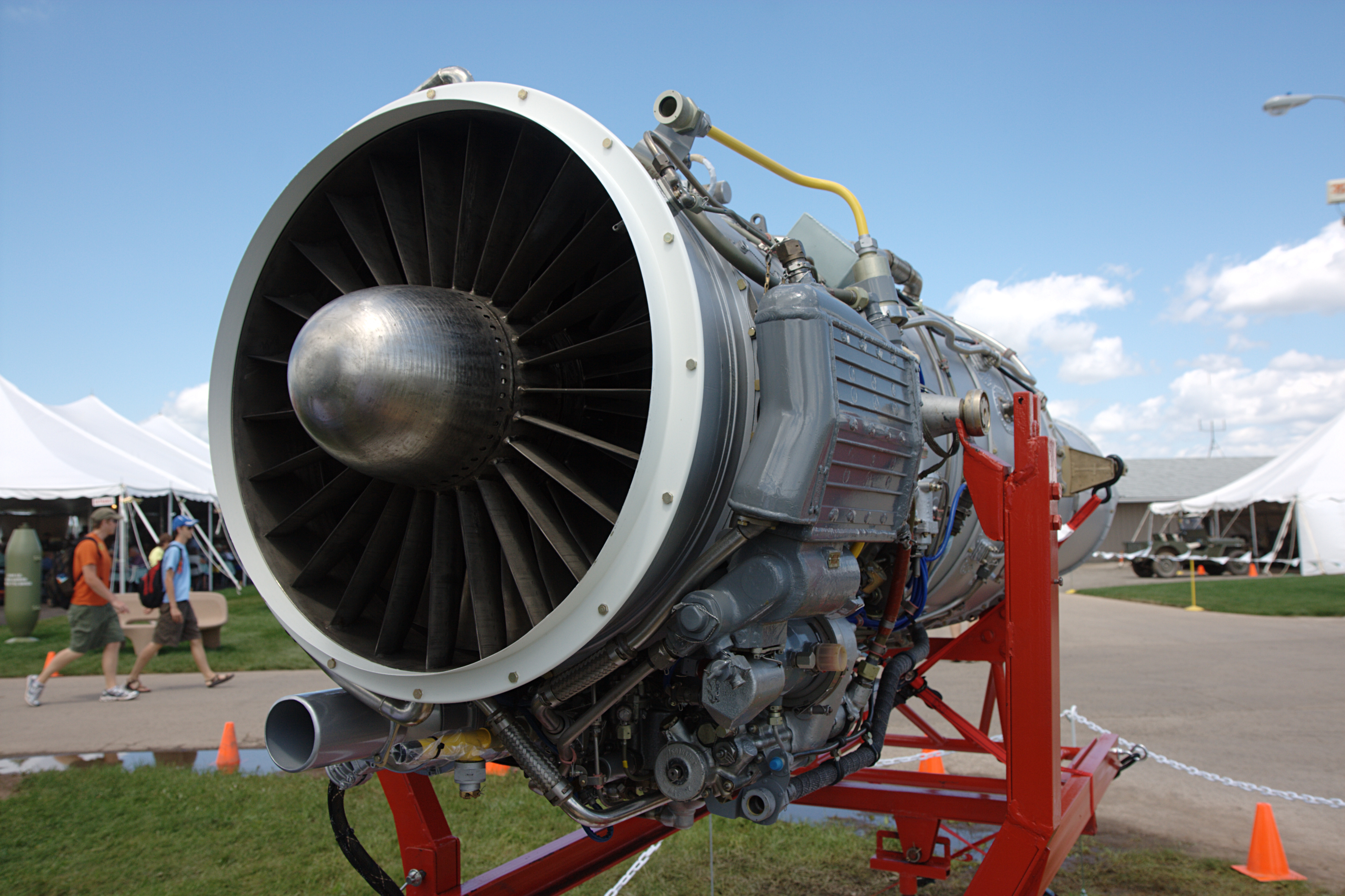
An AI-25 from an Aero L-39 Albatros

Data from

==== General characteristics ====
- Type: Medium Bypass Turbofan
- Length: 3,358 mm (132.2 in)
- Diameter: ~611.6 mm (24.08 in)(intake casing)
- Dry weight: 350 kg (770 lb)

==== Components ====
- Compressor: Axial, 3 fan/low pressure compressor stages, 9 high pressure compressor stages
- Combustors: Annular
- Turbine: 1 high pressure turbine stage, 2 low pressure turbine stages
- Fuel type: Aviation kerosene, JP-1 for example
- Oil system: Pressure spray with return

==== Performance ====
- Maximum thrust: Takeoff: 1,720 kgf (16.9 kN; 3,800 lbf); Cruise: 515 kgf (5.05 kN; 1,140 lbf)
- Overall pressure ratio: 9.5:1
- Bypass ratio: 2.0:1
- Fuel consumption: 468.1 kg/h (1,032 lb/h)
- Specific fuel consumption: Takeoff: 17 g/(kN⋅s) (0.6 lb/(lbf⋅h)); Cruise: 23.1 g/(kN⋅s) (0.815 lb/(lbf⋅h))
- Thrust-to-weight ratio: 4.914

== See also ==
Related development

- Lotarev DV-2

Comparable engines

- Garrett F109
- Garrett TFE731
- Williams FJ44
- Ivchenko-Progress AI-222

Related lists

- List of aircraft engines
