= List of slowest fixed-wing aircraft =

This article lists powered fixed-wing aircraft with a stall speed of 50 kilometres per hour (31 mph) or less, and certain other aircraft. It does not list helicopters or vertical take-off and landing aircraft.

Fixed-wing aircraft are limited by their stall speed, the slowest airspeed at which they can maintain level flight. This depends on weight, however an aircraft will typically have a published stall speed at maximum takeoff weight.

Short take-off and landing aircraft typically have a low stall speed.

== Slowest aircraft ==
The MacCready Gossamer Condor is a human-powered aircraft capable of flight as slow as 8 miles per hour (13 km/h). Its successor, the MacCready Gossamer Albatross can fly as slow as 9.23 miles per hour (14.85 km/h). It has a maximum speed of 18 miles per hour (29 km/h).

The To Phoenix, an inflatable human-powered aircraft, flew at 8.1 miles per hour (13.0 km/h). It had a wing loading of 0.15 lb/sqft, or 0.73 kg/m^{2}.

The Ruppert Archaeopteryx has a certified stall speed of 30–39 kilometres per hour (19–24 mph).

The Vought XF5U can fly as slow as 32 kilometres per hour (20 mph).

The Tapanee Pegazair-100 stall speed is 45 kilometres per hour (28 mph).

The Zenith STOL CH 701 and ICP Savannah both have stall speeds of 48 kilometres per hour (30 mph).

The Slepcev Storch has a stall speed of 40 kilometres per hour (25 mph). It is a 3/4 scale replica of the Fieseler Fi 156 Storch, which had a stall speed of 50 kilometres per hour (31 mph).

The British Auster WW2 reconnaissance aircraft had a placarded stall speed of 24 knots (44 km/h; 28 mph), but that was merely the speed at which its control surfaces lost authority. As reported in many personal accounts by the pilots in their memoirs, the speed at which the aircraft would actually stall was 24 miles per hour (39 km/h). Either speed making it the slowest aircraft used in WW2 and possibly the slowest conventional warplane of all time.

The Antonov An-2 had no published stall speed. At low speeds its elevator cannot generate enough downforce to exceed the stalling angle of attack. In practice it could maintain approximately 35 miles per hour (56 km/h) without descending.

The slowest jet-powered aircraft is the PZL M-15 Belphegor, with a stall speed of 58.5 knots (108.3 km/h; 67.3 mph)
