= PZL M-15 Belphegor =

Polish jet-powered biplane

M-15 Belphegor
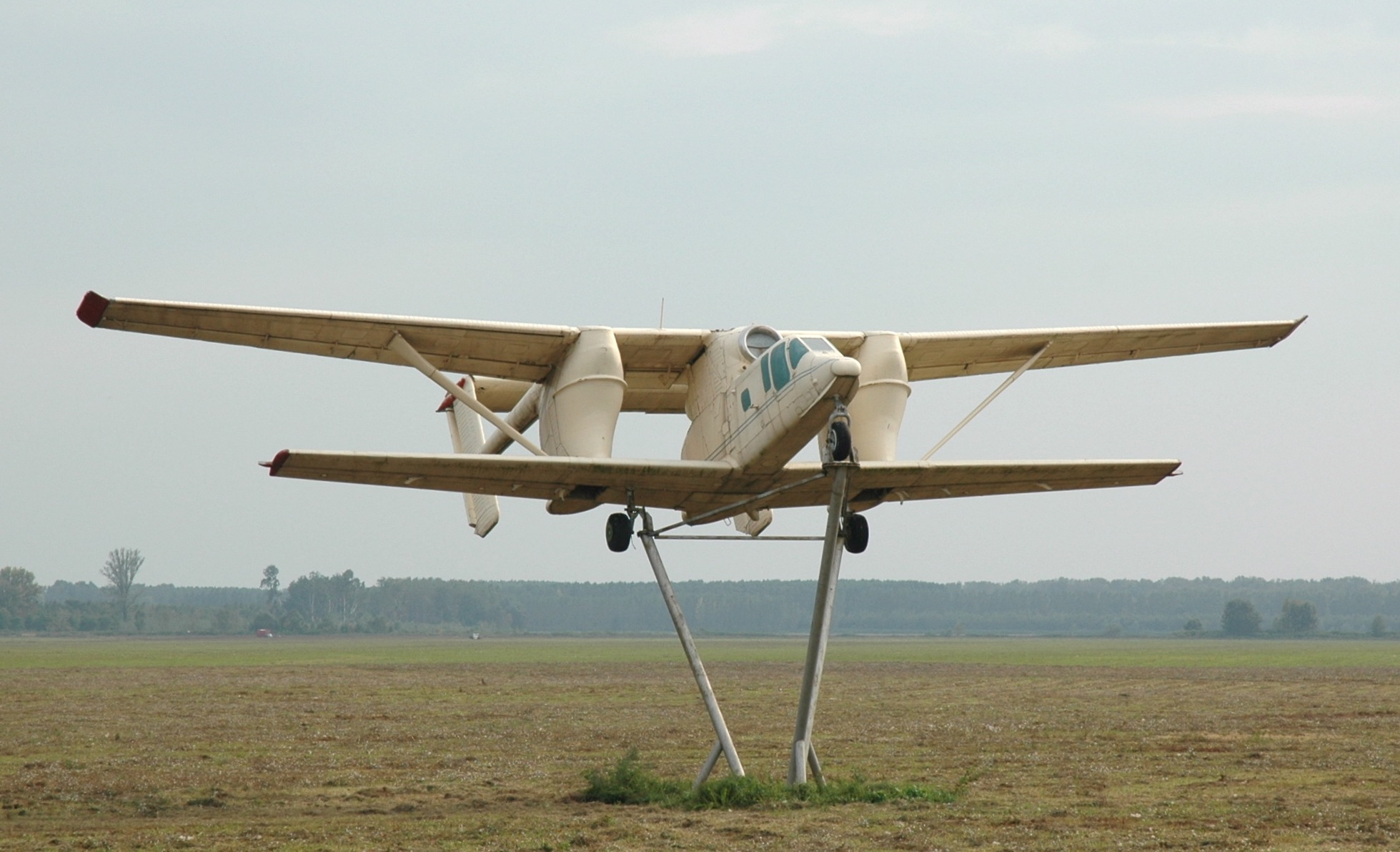
- M-15 displayed at the Szolnok-Szandaszőlős airfield

General information
- Type: Agricultural (jet) aircraft
- National origin: Poland
- Manufacturer: WSK PZL-Mielec
- Status: Out of production
- Number built: 175

History
- Manufactured: 1973–1981
- First flight: 20 May 1973

The PZL M-15 was a jet-powered sesquiplane designed and manufactured by the Polish aircraft company WSK PZL-Mielec for agricultural aviation. In reference to both its strange looks and relatively loud jet engine, the aircraft was nicknamed Belphegor, after the noisy demon.

Development of the M-15 can be traced back to a Soviet requirement for a modern agricultural aircraft to succeed the Antonov An-2; it was at the insistence of Soviet officials that jet propulsion would power the type. WSK Mielec's design team recognised the value of the An-2's biplane configuration to the role and set about developing an initial experimental aircraft, the Lala-1, for Latające Laboratorium 1 ("Flying Laboratory 1") to explore the use of a jet engine with such a configuration. On 20 May 1973, the first M-15 prototype performed its maiden flight; even during the test flight phase, it was apparent that there were several drawbacks to the aircraft, including its poor handling, limited range, and high operating costs. While production commenced in 1976, these problems remained unresolved and meant that the M-15 was noticeably inferior in several respects to the An-2. During 1981, production was terminated in favour of procuring more An-2s; a total of 175 M-15s were built against the many thousands which had once been planned.

== Development ==
=== Origins ===
By 1970, the Soviet Union was formulating a new requirement for an agricultural aircraft that it intended to use above the very large areas of Soviet farms, the kolkhoz collectives, and state-owned sovkhoz. It was explicitly stated in the requirement that the envisioned aircraft was to be both more efficient and modern than the existing Antonov An-2SKh and An-2R, of which tens of thousands had been produced primarily to perform this role. During 1971, following an agreement between the Soviet Union and Poland on the matter, the Polish aircraft manufacturer WSK Mielec set about developing its own original response to the requirement. By this point, Poland had already produced the agricultural Antonov An-2R under licence for export back to the USSR, while agricultural planes had become a Polish specialization within the Comecon.

WSK Mielec's design team was headed by two engineers, Kazimierz Gocyła and Riamir Izmailov. The designers recognised that it would be highly desirable to retain many of the characteristics of the successful An-2, while also improving upon them where feasible. As such, there was a reported desire to incorporate state-of-the-art technologies and to make the aircraft into a symbol of the rapid progress of development. According to aviation author Krzysztof Luto, the highly unusual decision to adopt jet engine propulsion for the prospective aircraft had been at the insistence of Soviet officials, who also actively participated in the design process. Accordingly, the design team were compelled to use such an engine due to political factors rather than practical ones. Recognising the favourable qualities of the An-2, it was decided to adopt some similar design features, such as its biplane configuration that gave favourable lift characteristics.

=== Flight testing ===
It was recognised from the onset that use of a jet engine for a relatively slow agricultural biplane posed several problems that would need to be addressed, including unforgiving handling and maintenance issues. In order to better explore these problems, an experimental airplane Lala-1, for Latające Laboratorium 1 ("Flying Laboratory 1"), was constructed in Poland. Performing its first flight on 10 February 1972, this aircraft comprised the whole forward section of an An-2, together with its wings, while the rear part was cut off and replaced with a frame construction that housed a single Ivchenko-Progress AI-25 turbofan engine (as used on the tri-engined Yakovlev Yak-40 and the single-engined Aero L-39 Albatros fighter-trainer). The Lala-1 was equipped with agricultural devices; experiences and data gathered from its test flights greatly influenced the design of the M-15.

On 30 May 1973, the first variant of the M-15 conducted its maiden flight; it was followed by the second prototype on 9 January 1974. During the following years, both aircraft were intensively tested, and were joined by a pre-production series. Even at this stage of the project, the aircraft's performance was being criticised and constantly compared unfavourably with its An-2 predecessor. The M-15 was publicly displayed at the Paris Air Show of 1976; it has been claimed that it was at this event that the aircraft received its popular nickname of "Belphegor", a result of its strange appearance and noisy jet engine propulsion.

=== Production ===
During 1976, serial production of the M-15 commenced. At one stage, Soviet agriculture planners had intended to order as many as 3,000 aircraft to meet its needs; however, operations of the M-15 under real world circumstances proved to be a largely disappointing experience. As an inherent consequence of adopting a jet engine, it was not an economical aircraft to operate, being inferior in this aspect to the An-2 that the M-15 had been envisioned to succeed. In contrast, the M-15 could only achieve a range of 215 nautical miles, half that of the An-2, largely due to its jet engine and relatively high weight. Maintenance was also more intensive, a factor which was compounded by the typically austere nature of agricultural airstrips. The aircraft was also expensive, both to construct and to operate. Furthermore, pilots would commonly need additional training for handling jet-powered aircraft, which was a further complication for any transition to the M-15.

Production of the aircraft was terminated without ceremony during 1981, by which point only 175 aircraft had been completed. The M-15 was only ever operated inside the USSR, despite the type having been made available to potential export customers. Taking its envisioned role was the preexisting An-2, which continued to be used in the agricultural role into the twenty-first century. Of those M-15s that were produced, very few remained operational by 1995, its operators having rarely found the aircraft to be satisfactory. It is believed that the M-15 is the world's only jet agricultural aircraft (i.e., the world's only jet cropduster), as well as the world's only jet biplane and the world's slowest jet aircraft, at least amongst aircraft that have been put in mass production.

== Design ==
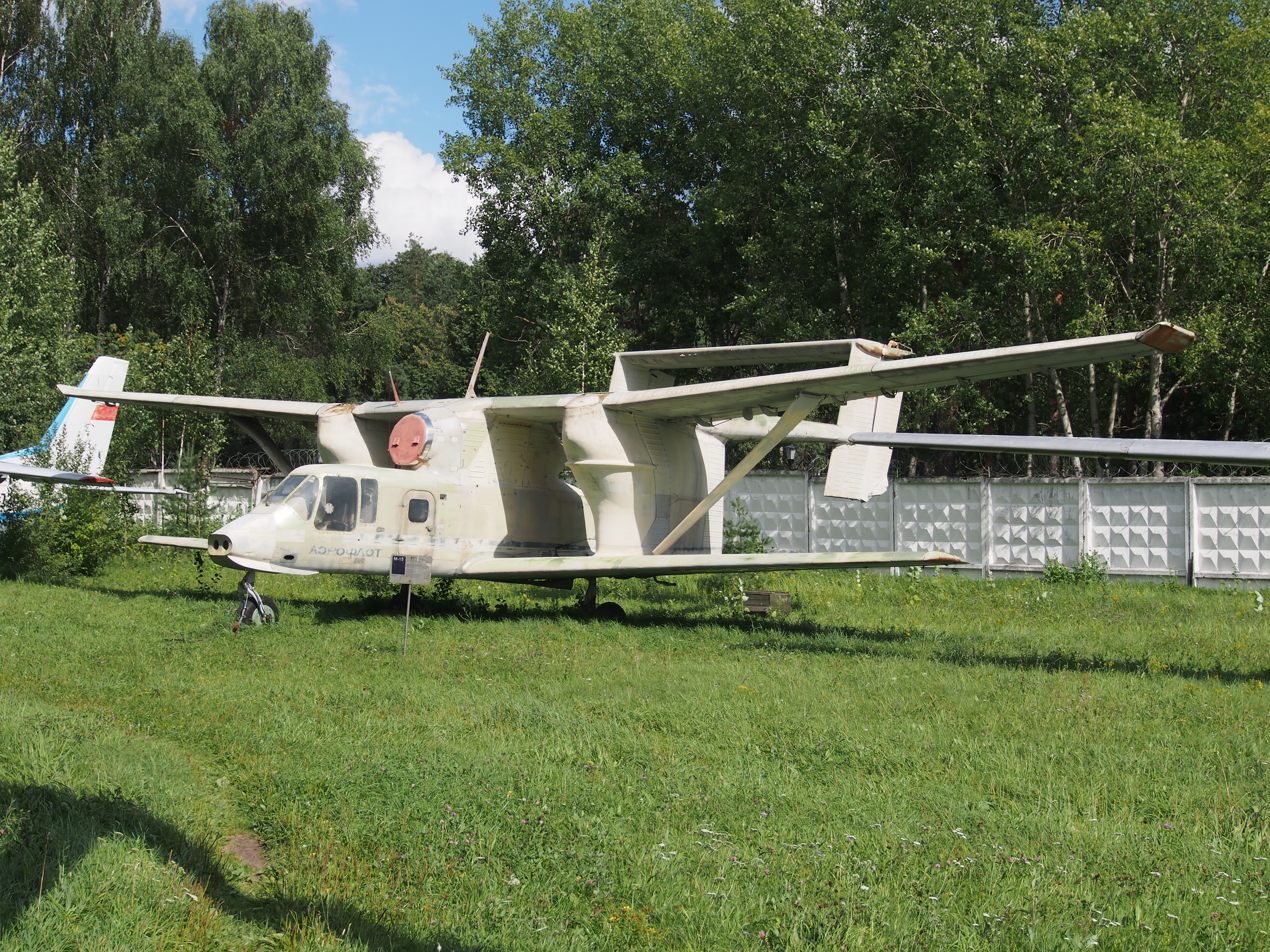
M-15 at Central Air Force Museum in Monino

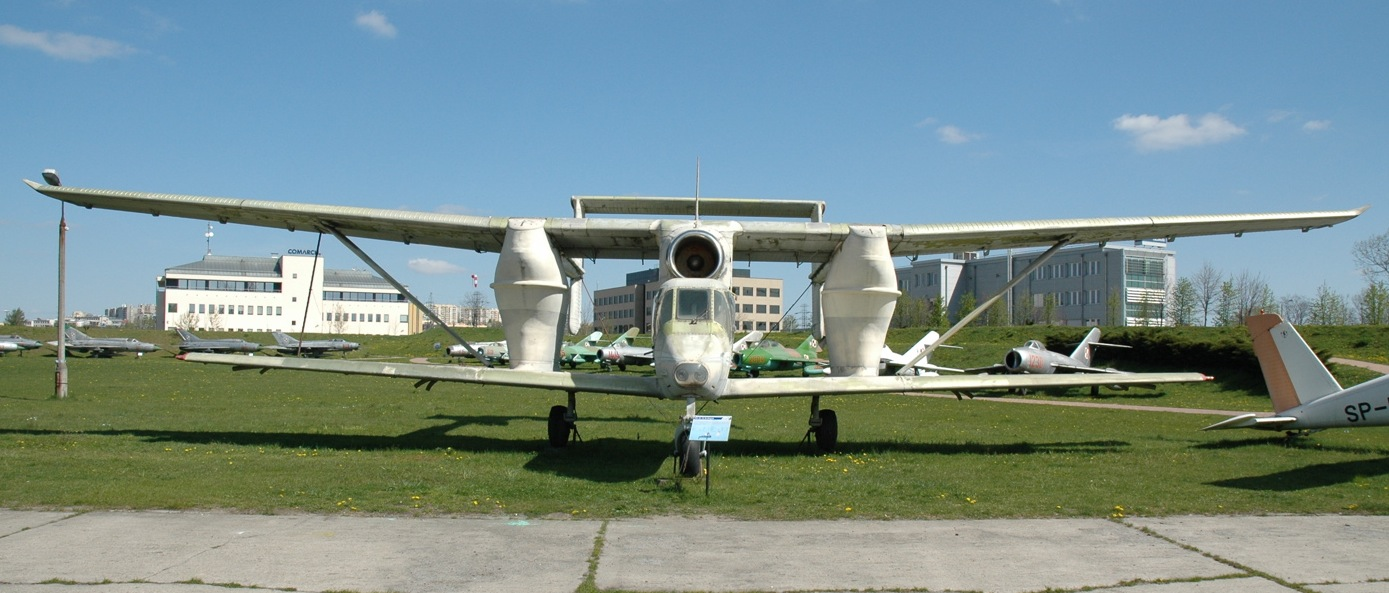
M-15 at Polish Aviation Museum

The PZL M-15 Belphegor was a metal twin-boom sesquiplane. It was intended to be routinely operated by a single pilot, but also had provisions for two additional crew to serve as technicians when deemed necessary. Portions of the lower wings and the chemicals tanks were composed of a laminate to avoid corrosion. The upper and lower wings were connected with two thick columns which housed the chemical tanks. It was outfitted with a fixed tricycle landing gear arrangement. The M-15 was a relatively heavy aircraft, and has been described as being the heaviest biplane ever to be produced.

For the crop-dusting mission, the M-15 could accommodate a payload of just under three tons of pesticides within two sizable pylons that separated its two wings; chemical dispersal was achieved via compressed air. This storage system was relatively unorthodox, as the conventional An-2 simply stored these in a single tank housed within the fuselage in a space that could be reused for various other cargoes if not fitted. As such, the arrangement adopted upon the M-15 allowed for no such flexibility and severely limited alternative uses for the aircraft. To avoid the engine exhaust interfering with the dispersal system during release, the engine had to be positioned in a relatively elevated location on top of the fuselage; this was also beneficial to minimise the engine's ingestion of debris, which was a particular problem when operating from austere airstrips.

== Specifications (M-15) ==
Data from Jane's All The World's Aircraft 1976–77

General characteristics

- Crew: 1
- Capacity:

- Seats for two groundcrew for ferry flights
- 2,900 L (770 US gal; 640 imp gal) liquid chemicals or
- 2,200 kg (4,850 lb) dry chemicals

- Length: 12.72 m (41 ft 9 in)
- Wingspan: 22.33 m (73 ft 3 in)
- Height: 5.34 m (17 ft 6 in)
- Wing area: 67.5 m^{2} (727 sq ft)
- Empty weight: 3,090 kg (6,812 lb)
- Max takeoff weight: 5,650 kg (12,456 lb)
- Powerplant: 1 × Ivchenko-Progress AI-25 turbofan, 14.7 kN (3,300 lbf) thrust

Performance

- Maximum speed: 200 km/h (120 mph, 110 kn)
- Cruise speed: 140–165 km/h (87–103 mph, 76–89 kn) (normal operating speed)
- Stall speed: 108 km/h (67 mph, 58 kn)
- Range: 400 km (250 mi, 220 nmi)
- Rate of climb: 4.8 m/s (940 ft/min)

== See also ==
- List of slowest fixed-wing aircraft
