= EADS Mako/HEAT =

European jet trainer/attack aircraft prototype

Mako/HEAT
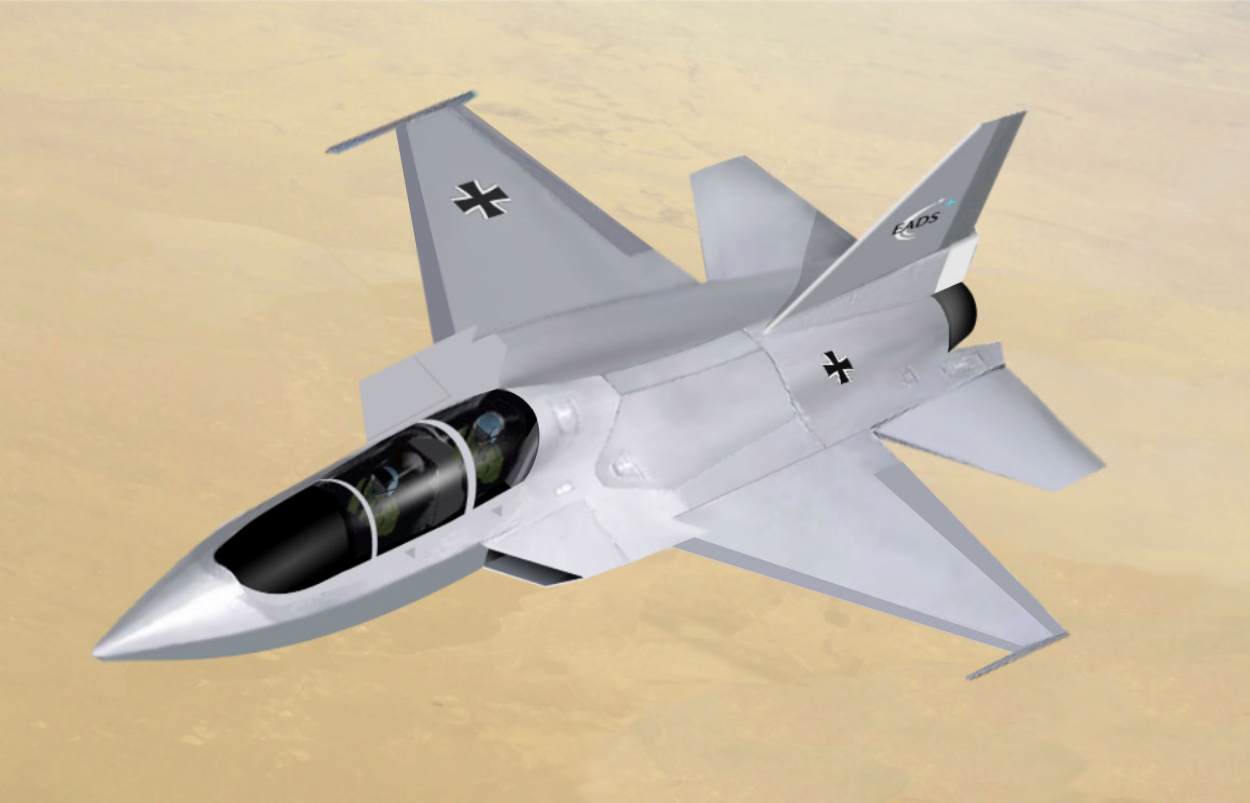
- EADS Mako art concept

General information
- Type: Jet trainer / light attack
- Manufacturer: EADS
- Status: Cancelled

The EADS Mako/High Energy Advanced Trainer (Mako/HEAT) was a proposed high-performance jet trainer or light attack aircraft.

The Mako emerged out of the AT-2000 project by the German aircraft manufacturer Dornier and the Italian aerospace company Aermacchi launched in the late 1980s. Following the withdrawal of Aermacchi in the mid 1990s, and a wave of aerospace consolidation in the 1990s, the European aerospace company EADS became the prime authority for the Mako. Various partnerships and opportunities were sought out for the type, early efforts included the South African Air Force, the South Korean Air Force and the United Arab Emirates Air Force - while memorandum of understandings (MoUs) were signed, it proved difficult to secure a launch customer for the Mako.

One key opportunity that the Mako was heavily marketed towards was the Advanced European Jet Pilot Training (AEJPT), or Eurotrainer, programme, under which as many as 120 aircraft would be procured for service with as many as 17 different European air forces. However, this initiative was repeatedly delayed before the remaining prospective members declared their preference for a twin-engine design, closing out this opportunity to the Mako. EADS publicly acknowledged that around 60 aircraft would need to be ordered in order to formally launch the Mako programme. As of 2010, EADS had yet to announce a date for the aircraft's maiden flight; the Mako/HEAT project appeared to be defunct.

== Development ==
The Mako/High Energy Advanced Trainer has its origins in the late 1980s and the AT-2000 initiative. In April 1989, the German aircraft manufacturer Dornier and the Italian aerospace firm Aermacchi launched a joint program to develop an advanced trainer. Five years later, Aermacchi opted to withdraw from the AT-2000 programme while DASA (which Dornier had merged into) decided to continue work on the program alone. During 1998, the AT-2000 was rebranded as Mako. Following the merger of DASA into the European aerospace company EADS, the Mako programme persisted. Between the late 1990s and mid 2000s, numerous European aerospace firms were announced as being subcontractors on the Mako project, including Diehl Aerospace, Aermacchi, Saab, EAB, and Dassault Aviation.

One early bid involving the Mako was made during the late 1990s was for the South African Air Force, but this was ultimately lost to the BAE Hawk and Saab Gripen. Around the same time, it was also submitted for the South Korean Air Force's requirement for a new advanced trainer, however, this opportunity went to the KAI T-50 Golden Eagle instead.

During November 1999, a memorandum of understanding (MoU) was signed by DASA and the United Arab Emirates Air Force regarding potential collaboration on the Mako programme. Two years later, a follow-on agreement on the program was signed between EADS and the UAE. The United Arab Emirates Air Force participated in Mako's definition phase and opportunities were explored for industrial participation for UAE-based companies. However, the nation was ultimately unwilling to commit to being the type's launch customer.

During the early to mid 2000s, much of EADS' ambitions for the aircraft were related to the Eurotrainer programme, which had been originally conceived with the support of 17 nations. As envisioned under the Eurotrainer initiative, as many as 120 trainers would have been procured and deployed at three shared bases that were located across continental Europe, which would be equally used by all participating partner nations. The initiative suffered repeated delays, which undermined the momentum for the Mako. Furthermore, the Mako was not the only aircraft proposed to fulfil the Eurotrainer niche, competitors included the Alenia Aermacchi M-346 Master.

During June 2006, it was announced that an agreement for the Advanced European Jet Pilot Training (AEJPT) programme (alternatively known as European Staff Requirement for the Eurotraining) had been reached. By March 2007, it was reported that a memorandum of understanding for the AEJPT's progression into the pre-contract phase was close to being signed by nine nations following a procedural delay two months prior. However, by this point, the programme had lost numerous prospective members, including the participation of Germany and Switzerland during 2006 alone, often in favour of procuring alternative options such as the Pilatus PC-21. However, that same month, it was reported that the programme’s remaining partners had a preference for a twin-engine platform, such as the M-346, in contrast to the single-engine Mako; this outcome was viewed as being impactful upon the future of the aircraft itself.

By February 2009, work on Mako had been reportedly shelved. EADS had publicly stated that it would need to secure orders for roughly 60 aircraft to proceed with a formal launch.

== Design ==
The EADS Mako/HEAT was a purpose-build high performance aircraft intended for either training or light attack missions. The cockpit could house up to two occupants underneath a shared streamlined bubble canopy. The Mako comprised numerous features that were typically common to stealth aircraft of the era, including a faceted exterior and the use of composite construction, which reportedly incorporated some of the knowledge gained from the MBB Lampyridae stealth program.

The Mako was to be equipped with a quadruplex digital fly-by-wire flight control system; unusually, this was intended to be reprogrammable so that flight behaviour could be adjusted to make the aircraft either easier or more challenging for the trainee pilot to handle. The flight control surfaces included single-section flaperons, an all-moving tailplane, an inset rudder, and full-span leading-edge slats. The aircraft's trapezoidal wing had a swept leading edge of 45 degrees; the wing was attached to the centreline of the fuselage. The Mako was furnished with retractable tricycle landing gear.

It also employed a modular avionics approach that was intended to permit relatively easy upgradability along with the ability to tailor the configuration to individual customer specifications. It was intended to offer a multimode radar set as an option, although a specific unit was not ever announced to have been selected. Depending on customer requirements, a combat-oriented Mako could be equipped with an internally-mounted 27mm cannon along with seven hardpoints for munitions and stores. While the wingtip hardpoints were only intended for air-to-air missiles, the majority were intended to be compatible with a range of air-to-surface missiles, bombs, external fuel tanks, and reconnaissance pods.

The Mako was to be powered by a single aft-mounted jet engine that was fed air via a pair of intake ramps located within the wing roots. During December 2002, the General Electric F414M, which is a slightly derated version (at 75 kN) of the standard F414, was selected to power the Mako, overcoming competition from the Eurojet EJ200 and the Snecma M88.

== Specifications ==
Data from

General characteristics

- Crew: one (attack), two (trainer)
- Length: 13.75 m (45 ft 1 in)
- Wingspan: 8.25 m (27 ft 1 in)
- Height: 4.5 m (14 ft 9 in)
- Wing area: 25.08 m^{2} (270.0 sq ft)
- Empty weight: 6,200 kg (13,669 lb)
- Max takeoff weight: 13,000 kg (28,660 lb)
- Powerplant: 1 × General Electric F414M turbofan, 55.56 kN (12,490 lbf) thrust dry, 75 kN (17,000 lbf) with afterburner

Performance

- Maximum speed: 1,600 km/h (990 mph, 860 kn)
- Maximum speed: Mach 1.5
- Combat range: 1,300 km (810 mi, 700 nmi)
- Ferry range: 3,700 km (2,300 mi, 2,000 nmi)
- Service ceiling: 15,240 m (50,000 ft)

Armament

- Guns: 1× 27 mm gun
- Hardpoints: 7 with a capacity of 4500 kg
- Rockets: Up to four pods
- Missiles: 4× AIM-9 Sidewinder, IRIS-T or ASRAAM, AMRAAM, FMRAAM or MICA, 5x AGM-65 Maverick, 2× anti-ship missile
- Bombs: Up to 12× Mk 82, 8× Mk 83, 4× GBU-16, or 3x GBU-24

== See also ==
Aircraft of comparable role, configuration, and era

- Aermacchi M-346
- Hongdu L-15
- Guizhou JL-9
- HAL HJT-36
- KAI T-50 Golden Eagle
- Yakovlev Yak-130
