= Moscow Aircraft Production Association =

Russian military aircraft manufacturer

MAPO - the Moscow Aircraft Production Association (Russian: Московское авиационное производственное объединение, romanized: Moskovskoye aviatsionnoye proizvodstvennoye obyedineniye) was a major Russian state-owned military aircraft manufacturer.

== History ==
MAPO has its origins in Plant #30 of the Dux Factory company. Plant #30 was established in 1939 in Dubna. In December 1941, it was relocated to the former site of Plant #1, where it manufactured the Ilyushin Il-2. In 1950, it merged with Plant #381, to produce the Il-28 in larger volumes. In 1953, Lukhovitsy Machine Building Plant was established as a subsidiary of the plant.

Plant #30 became known as the Znamya Truda Machine-Building Plant in 1965, and as the Moscow Aircraft Production Organisation in 1973.

In the early 1990s, it employed 30,000 workers. In 1995, MAPO was merged with the Mikoyan Design Bureau, forming MAPO-MiG. In January 1996, a decree of President Boris Yeltsin established MAPO VPK, which combined 12 different aviation companies, including MAPO-MiG, Kamov, Klimov, the Chernyshev Machine Building Enterprise and Aviabank.

Unlike Sukhoi, which managed to secure export contracts with China and India, MAPO continued to be unprofitable throughout the 1990s. In December 1999, MAPO was renamed Russian Aircraft Corporation MiG.

In 2006, MAPO merged with Sukhoi and several other Russian aviation companies to form United Aircraft Corporation. The majority of MAPO's former assets are now part of Mikoyan.

The Lukhovitsy and Znamya Truda plants are currently known as 'MiG Manufacturing Complex №1' (ПК №1 PCK «МиГ») and 'MiG Manufacturing Complex №2' (ПК №2 PCK «МиГ»), respectively.

== Names ==
Over the years, it has also been known as OSOAVIAKHIM Plant #1, GAZ No. 1, Menjinski Plant #39, Orjonikidze Plant #381, Plant #30, MMZ (Moscow Machine-Building Plant) "Znamya Truda" (Banner of Labor), P.A. Voronin Production Center, and "Moscow Aircraft Production Organization (MAPO) named after Dementyev" (Pyotr Dementyev, Minister of Aircraft Industry from 1953 to 1977).
