= Yakovlev Yak-130 =

Russian light combat aircraft

Yak-130
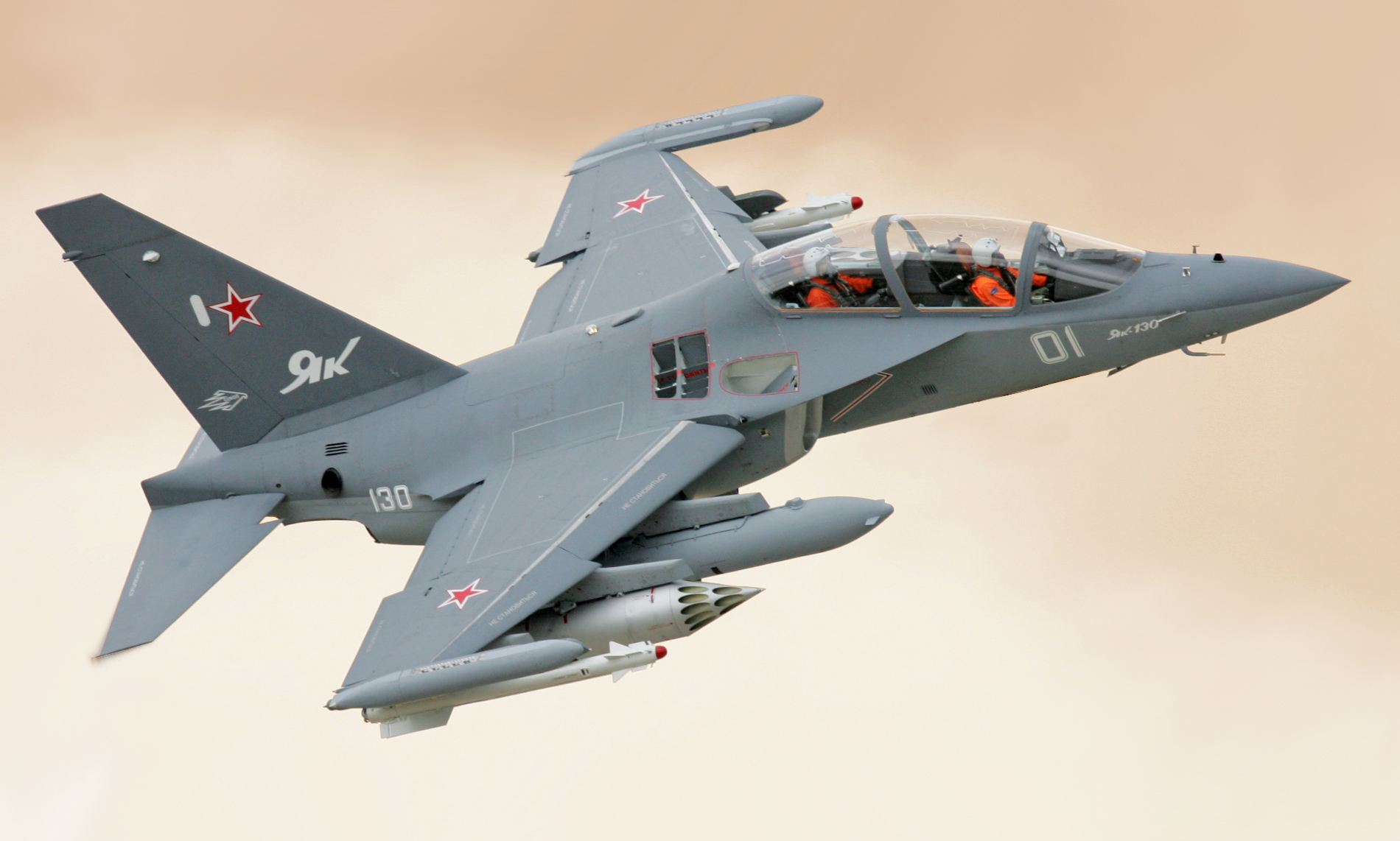
- A Russian Air Force Yak-130 carrying R-73 short-range air-to-air missiles and rocket pods

General information
- Type: Lead-in fighter trainer / Light combat aircraft
- National origin: Russia
- Designer: Yakovlev
- Built by: Irkut Corporation; Sokol Aircraft Plant
- Status: Active
- Primary users: Russian Aerospace Forces Bangladesh Air Force; Algerian Air Force; Myanmar Air Force; Islamic Republic of Iran Air Force
- Number built: 219

History
- Introduction date: 19 February 2010
- First flight: 25 April 1996; 30 years ago (Yak/AEM-130); 30 April 2004; 22 years ago (Yak-130)
- Variant: Alenia Aermacchi M-346 Master

The Yakovlev Yak-130 (NATO reporting name: Mitten) is a subsonic, two-seat, advanced jet trainer and light combat aircraft.

The aircraft began as the Yak/AEM-130, a joint project by Russian Yakovlev and Italian Aermacchi aerospace defence contractors. Development of the aircraft began in 1991, and it first flew in April 1996. In 2000, the companies ended the partnership, and Yakovlev continued to develop the aircraft as the Yak-130.

In 2002, it won a Russian government tender for training aircraft, and in 2010, the aircraft entered service with the Russian Air Force. The Yak-130 can be programmed to mimic the handling characteristics of several Russian fourth generation fighters and the fifth-generation Sukhoi Su-57. It can also perform light-attack and reconnaissance duties, carrying a combat load of 3,000 kg (6,600 lb).

== Development ==
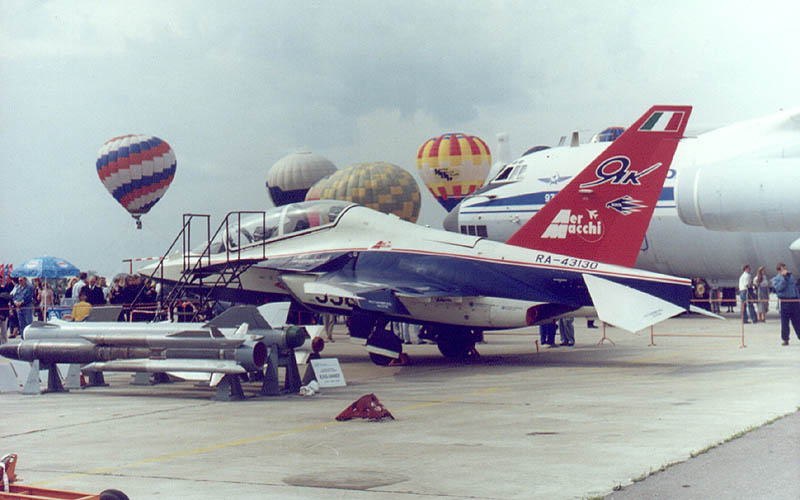
A AEM/YAK-130D at the Zhukovsky Airfield, 1999

In the early 1990s, the Soviet government asked the industry to develop a new aircraft to replace the Czech-made Aero L-29 Delfín and Aero L-39 Albatros jet trainers. Five design bureaus put forward proposals. Among them were the Sukhoi S-54, Myasishchev M-200, Mikoyan MiG-AT, and Yakovlev Yak-UTS. In 1991, the other proposals were dropped and only the MiG-AT and Yak-UTS remained. The air forces of the newly independent Russia estimated that its requirement would be about 1,000 aircraft.

Development of Yak-UTS started in 1991, and the design was completed in September 1993. With the collapse of the Soviet Union, Yakovlev was compelled to look for a foreign partner. After having entered discussions in 1992, it agreed the next year with the Italian company Aermacchi to jointly develop the plane, which now became the AEM/YAK-130D. Aermacchi would be responsible for the project's financial and technical support.

The first prototype, dubbed AEM/YAK-130D, was built by Sokol at Nizhny Novgorod, Russia, and was publicly unveiled in June 1995. The aircraft made its first flight on 25 April 1996 from Zhukovsky Airport at the hands of Yakovlev chief test pilot Andrey Sinitsyn.

In 2000, differences in priorities between the two firms brought about an end to the partnership, with each developing the aircraft independently. The Italian version was named the M-346. Yakovlev received US$77 million, in the form of a partial write-off of the USSR/Russian debt towards Italy and for the legal right to use some of the technical documents of the aircraft. Yakovlev would be able to sell the aircraft to countries such those in the Commonwealth of Independent States, India, Slovakia, and Algeria. Aermacchi would be able to sell to NATO countries, among others.

In March 2002, Commander-in-Chief Vladimir Mikhailov said that the Yak-130 and the MiG-AT had been chosen as the Russian Air Force's new trainers. The Yak-130, however, was said to be superior, as it could serve the dual role of a trainer and combat jet. In April 2002, the Yak-130 was chosen as the winner of the tender for trainer aircraft for basic and advanced pilot training, beating the MiG-AT. By then, the Russian Air Force had ordered 10 Yak-130s. The total cost of research and development, which included the construction and testing of the four preproduction aircraft, had amounted to some $200 million, 84% of which was financed by Yakovlev and the rest by the Russian government. It was reported that as much as $500 million had been spent in as early as 1996.

Plans to develop a light-attack aircraft based on the Yak-130 came to a halt in the late 2011. Dubbed Yak-131, the aircraft failed to meet critical pilot safety requirements put forward by the Russian Air Force. The air force had instead shifted focus to a dedicated replacement for its Su-25s instead.

=== Further development ===
In 2023, the United Engine Corporation showcased a mockup of the promising Salyut SM-100 engine, a further development of the Ivchenko-Progress AI-222-25 turbofan engine. The engine differs from its Russian-Ukrainian predecessor with improved technical characteristics, including twenty percent more thrust and double the service life. This is achieved through an increased compression ratio, the introduction of a modernised three-stage low-pressure compressor, and an improved combustion chamber.

In August 2024, an updated version of the aircraft, named the Yak-130M, was unveiled by the United Aircraft Corporation at the "Armiya" International Military-Technical Forum. The main changes include the enhancement of the combat capabilities of the aircraft, for use in frontline combat duties, counter drone, and precision strike operations. The upgraded aircraft includes a new BRLS-130R search-and-track AESA radar, SOLT-130K targeting pod (derived from the SOLT-25 system on the Sukhoi Su-25SM3) and President-S130 self-defence system. Other changes include the new KSS-130 communications and data-exchange system. Weapons integration has been expanded to include R-74M short range air-to-air missiles, R-77-1 long range air-to-air missiles and Kh-38 air-to-surface missiles. The aircraft can also be equipped with FAB-120 bombs, GSh-23L guns or S-8 rocket pods.

Rostec have emphasised the suitability of the Yak-130M in intercepting one-way attack drones and naval drones. Feedback from export users heavily influenced the upgrades to the aircraft.

On 25 June 2026, the first Yak-130M prototype made its first flight from the Irkutsk Aviation Plant. The flight lasted fifty minutes, flew at an altitude of 2,000 m and reached a maximum speed of 600 km/h. The flight was conducted by test pilot Alexander Guskov and test pilot Andrey Voropaev. Two more prototypes made their first flight in 1 August and 9 October 2026.

== Design ==
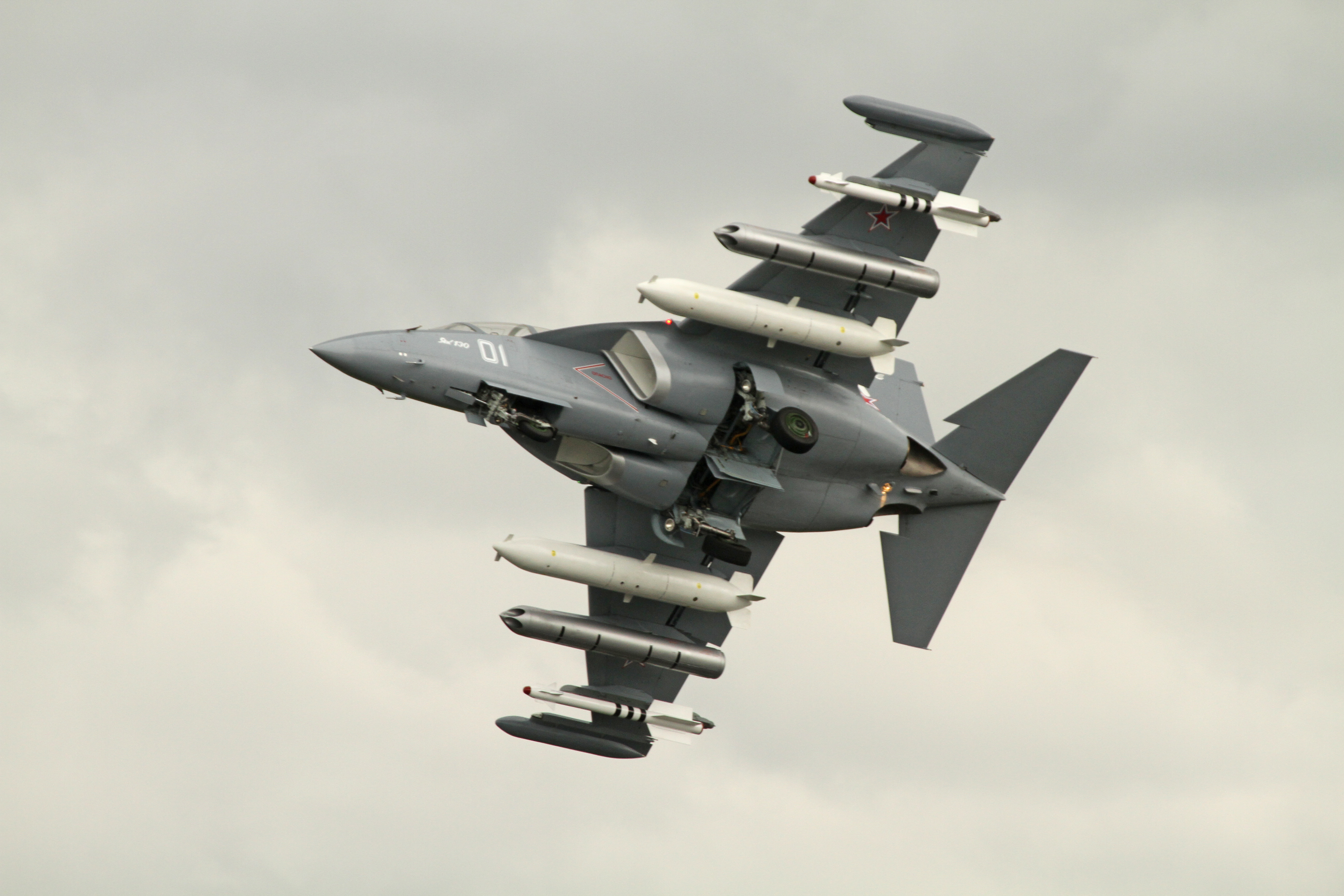
The underside of a Yak-130

The Yak-130 is an advanced pilot-training aircraft, able to replicate characteristics of Russian fourth and fifth-generation fighters. This is possible through the use of open architecture digital avionics compliant with a 1553 Databus, a full digital glass cockpit, four-channel digital fly-by-wire system (FBWS), and instructor-controlled and variable FBWS handling characteristics and embedded simulation. It has a head-up display and a helmet-mounted sighting system, with a double GPS/GLONASS receiver updating an inertial reference system for highly accurate navigation and precision targeting. The developer estimated that the plane can cover up to 80% of the entire pilot flight-training program.

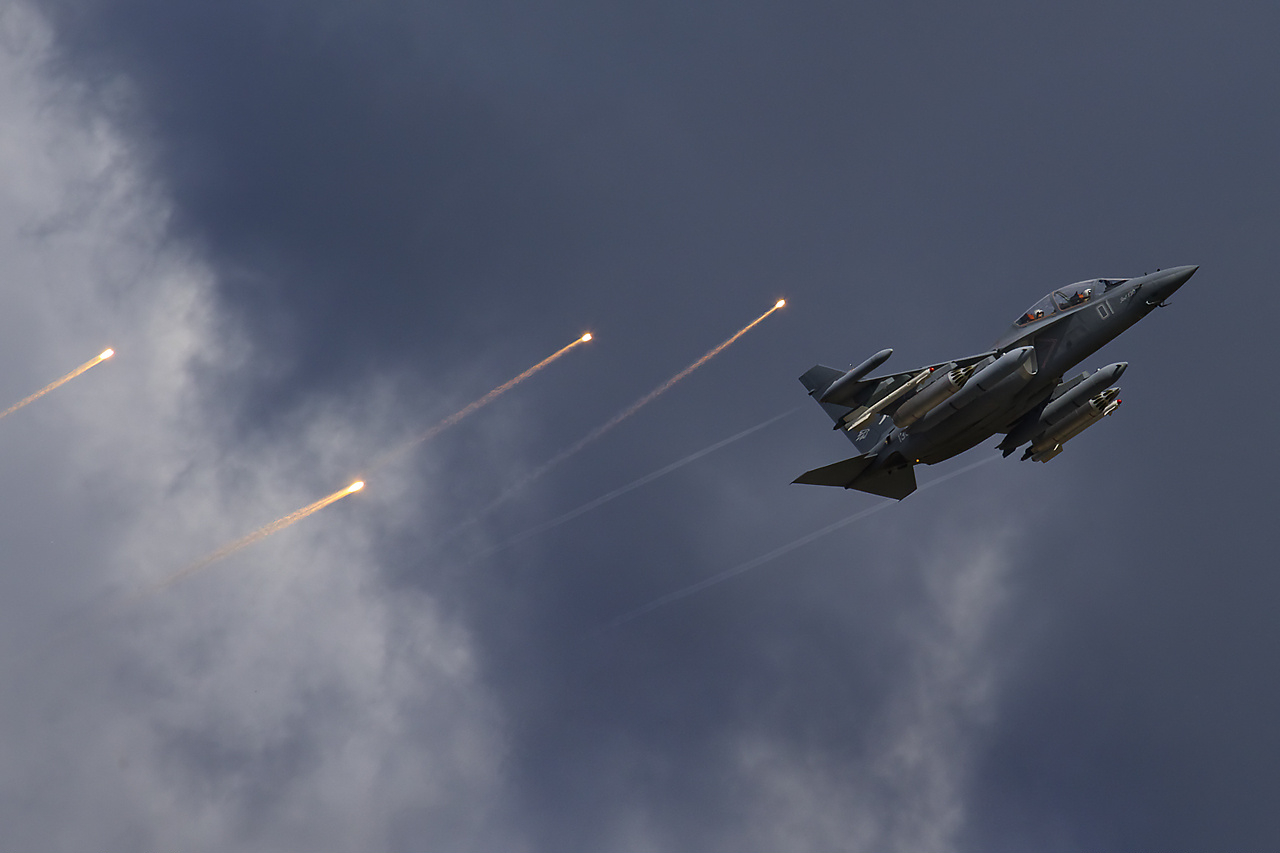
A Yak-130 deploying flares

The aircraft is capable of fulfilling light-attack and reconnaissance duties. It can carry a combat load of 3,000 kg (6,600 lb), consisting of guided and unguided weapons, auxiliary fuel tanks, and electronic pods. According to its chief designer, Konstantin Popovich, the plane was tested with "all airborne weapons with a weight of up to 500 kg that are in service in the Russian Air Force". The Yak-130 has nine hardpoints - two wingtip, six under-wing, and one under-fuselage.

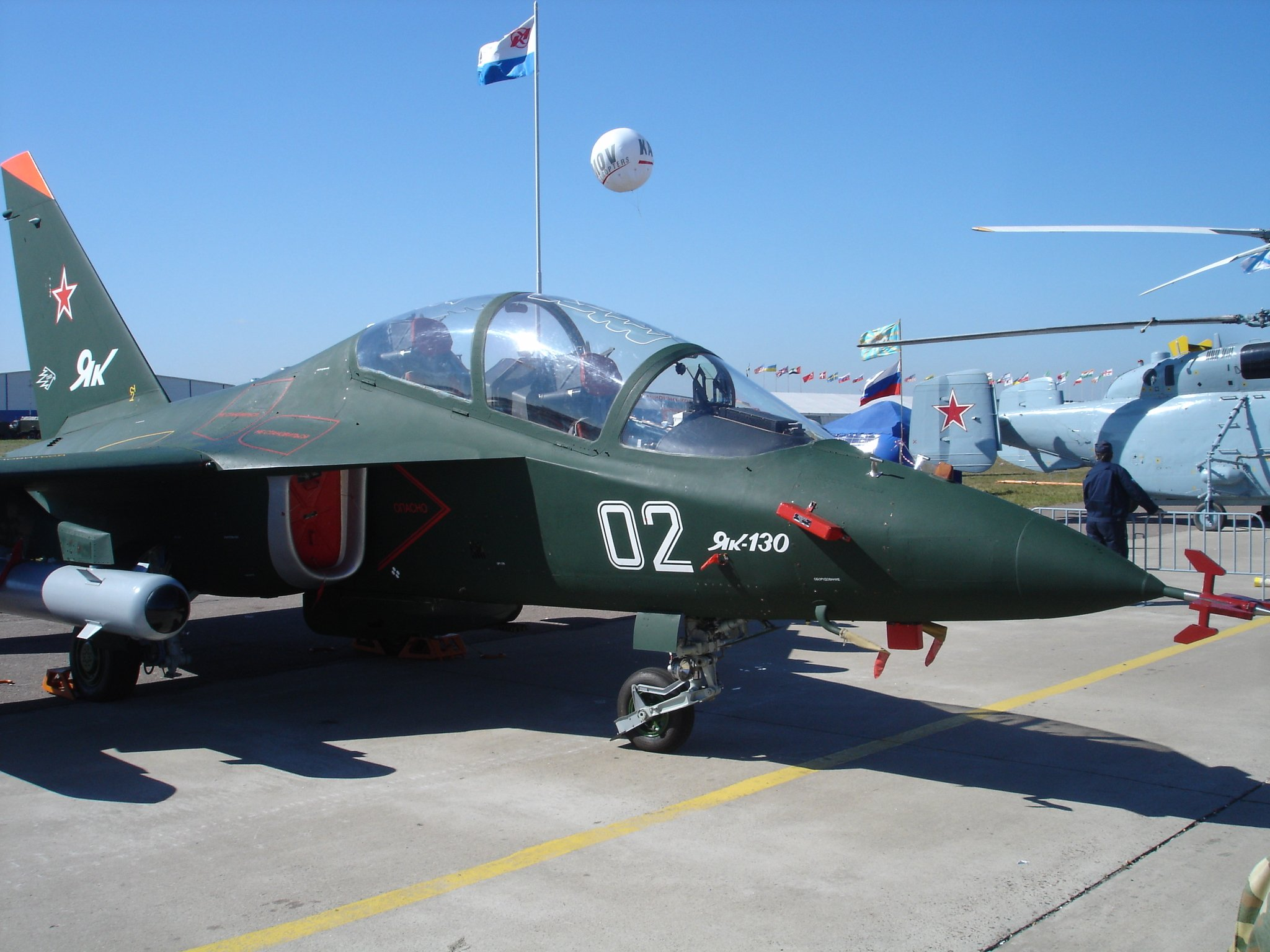
A Yak-130 at the MAKS 2005 air show

The aircraft's twin engines are mounted under extended wing roots, which reach as far forward as the cockpit canopy. Two Ivchenko Progress AI-222-25 Full Authority Digital Engine Control produce a combined total of 49 kilonewtons (11,000 pound-force) of thrust. An upgraded, "-28" engine is also on offer, increasing the thrust to 53 kN (12,000 lbf). At a normal take-off weight of 7,250 kg (15,980 lb), a thrust-to-weight ratio of 0.70 is achieved with the "-25", or 0.77 with the "-28" engines. This compares with 0.65 for the BAE Systems Hawk 128 and 0.49 for the Aero Vodochody L-159B.

Maximum internal fuel capacity is 1,700 kg (3,700 lb). With two external combat fuel tanks, the figure increases to 2,600 kg (5,700 lb). Maximum true airspeed is Mach 0.93 (572 knots), service ceiling is 12,500 m (41,000 ft), and load factors are from −3 to +9 g. Typical take-off speed and distance in a "clean" configuration are 209 km/h (113 kn) and 550 m (1,800 ft). Landing figures are 191 km/h (103 kn) and 750 m (2,460 ft). The cross-wind limit is 56 km/h (30 kn).

The Yakovlev Yak-130 is equipped with engine intake blanking doors, controlled by the FBWS, to prevent the aircraft's engines from sustaining foreign object damage when operating from unpaved runways and grass strips.

The large canopies are sideways hinged.

The combat training suite on the Yak-130 includes simulated and real firing systems with air-to-air and air-to-surface missiles, bomb dropping, gun firing, and on-board self-protection systems.

== Orders and deliveries ==
=== Firm orders ===
==== Russia ====
A pair of Yak-130s of the Russian Air Force

In 2005, the Russian Air Force ordered 12 Yak-130s. The Russian Aerospace Forces intended to buy at least 72 Yak-130s, enough to equip four training regiments. In November 2011, the Russian Defence Ministry signed a contract with Irkut Corporation for 65 additional aircraft – 55 firm orders plus 10 options. Deliveries were expected to be completed by 2017.

The first serial aircraft was handed to a training center in Lipetsk in February 2010. Once the 2005 contract for 12 Sokol plant-made Yak-130s for the Russian Ministry of Defense (MoD) was fulfilled in June 2011, a decision was made that all subsequent Yak-130 orders, both domestic and export ones, would be handled by the Irkutsk Aviation Plant of the Irkut Corporation. In October 2012, the Russian Air Force took delivery of the first Yak-130 built by the Irkutsk plant.

In February 2014, Irkut Corporation revealed a contract with the MoD to supply additional Yakovlev Yak-130 advanced jet trainers to the air force. According to Irkut president Oleg Demchenko, the company in December signed a contract with the MoD on the delivery of 12 Yak-130s to form a new aerobatics team. At the same time, a second contract for 10 more aircraft for the Russian Naval Aviation was signed.

Deliveries of the upgraded Yak-130M aircraft are scheduled to take place in 2028.

==== Algeria ====
Algeria was the first export customer for the Yak-130, ordering 16 aircraft in March 2006. Their delivery started only a few months after the arrival of the first Yak-130s in the Russian Air Force, in 2011, and the order was completed the next year.

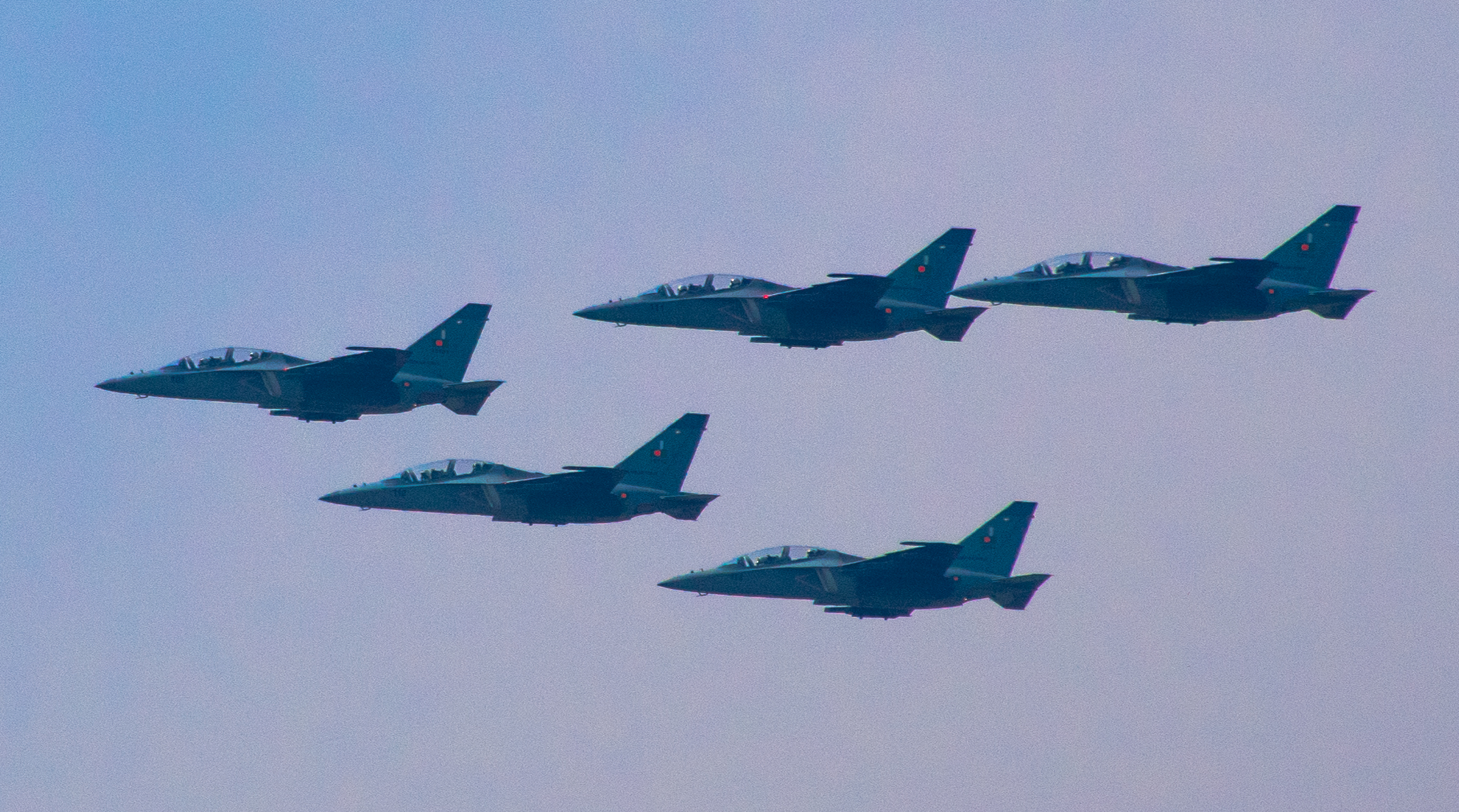
Yak-130s of the Bangladesh Air Force

==== Bangladesh ====
In January 2014, Bangladesh ordered 24 Yak-130s. The aircraft were bought with an extended loan from Russia Later the order was reduced to 16 aircraft. The first batch of six aircraft was delivered on 20 September 2015.

==== Belarus ====
In December 2012, the government of Belarus signed an agreement with Russia to provide four Yak-130s to Belarus by April 2015. Another order for four aircraft was placed in August 2015, and these were delivered in November 2016. A further four aircraft were delivered in 2019, bringing the total to 12. All were delivered to the 206th Flight Training Centre.

==== Laos ====
Laos ordered 10 Yak-130s in August 2017. Deliveries started in 2018.

==== Myanmar ====
Myanmar ordered six Yak-130s in June 2015. All six aircraft were delivered in December 2017. Six additional aircraft were ordered later. Following the 2021 coup, Myanmar received a further six jets, which were revealed at the 74th-anniversary ceremony of Myanmar's Air Force.

==== Iran ====
Iran acquired Yak-130 jet trainers. The first Yak-130 aircraft were delivered to Iran in September 2023, with photos showing at least two jets arriving at Isfahan's Shahid Babaei Air Base. Subsequent imagery and reporting suggest more may have been delivered later. Exact numbers and deal cost were not publicly disclosed. These jet trainers are being utilized by the Iranian Air Force for various roles, including drone interception patrols and air-to-air combat missions.

=== Potential orders ===
In April 2012, Irkut Corporation president Alexey Fedorov claimed it had "more than ten potential customers".

==== Argentina ====
In 2021, Russia offered the Argentine Air Force a batch of 15 MiG-29 fighters and another batch of 12 Su-30 fighters and sought also the sale of Yak-130 training jet and Mil Mi-17 helicopters.

==== Bolivia ====
Bolivia is considering the Yak-130 as a candidate for the replacement of its retired Lockheed T-33s.

==== Kazakhstan ====
Two rounds of negotiations with Russia regarding a potential order for Yak-130s took place in 2010 and 2012. No firm orders came out of it, but the Yak-130 may be bought to replace Kazakhstan's current Aero L-39C trainers, at the end of their service life. It was reported in late August 2026 that Kazakhstan was negotiating with China for the purchase of up to six K-8s to fill the role instead.

==== Malaysia ====
In November 2012, Sergey Kornev, a representative of Rosoboronexport (Russia's state intermediary agency for exports/imports of defense-related products), said Malaysia and several other countries were also interested in the Yak-130. He was speaking at the China Airshow at Zhuhai.

==== Uruguay ====
The Uruguayan Air Force is considering the aircraft for the future replacement of the A-37 with presumably used examples of the F-5 Freedom Fighter as another possible candidate.

==== Vietnam ====
In addition to the 12 delivered Yak-130, Vietnam is reportedly signing for 18 Yak-130M, as reported by Irkutsk officials.

=== Cancelled and unimplemented orders ===
==== Libya ====
Libya placed an order for six planes. Deliveries were expected in 2011–2012, but the Libyan National Transitional Council cancelled the order for Yak-130s in September 2011 as part of a review of all existing arms contracts.

==== Syria ====
Syria had agreed to purchase 36 aircraft, but delivery of these was postponed by Russia due to the conflict in Syria. In May 2014 Russia announced that it would supply Syria with Yakovlev Yak-130s. Syria was expected to receive nine aircraft by the end of 2014, 12 in 2015, and 15 in 2016, for a total of 36 airplanes. However, as of 2019, no deliveries had taken place.

== Operational history ==
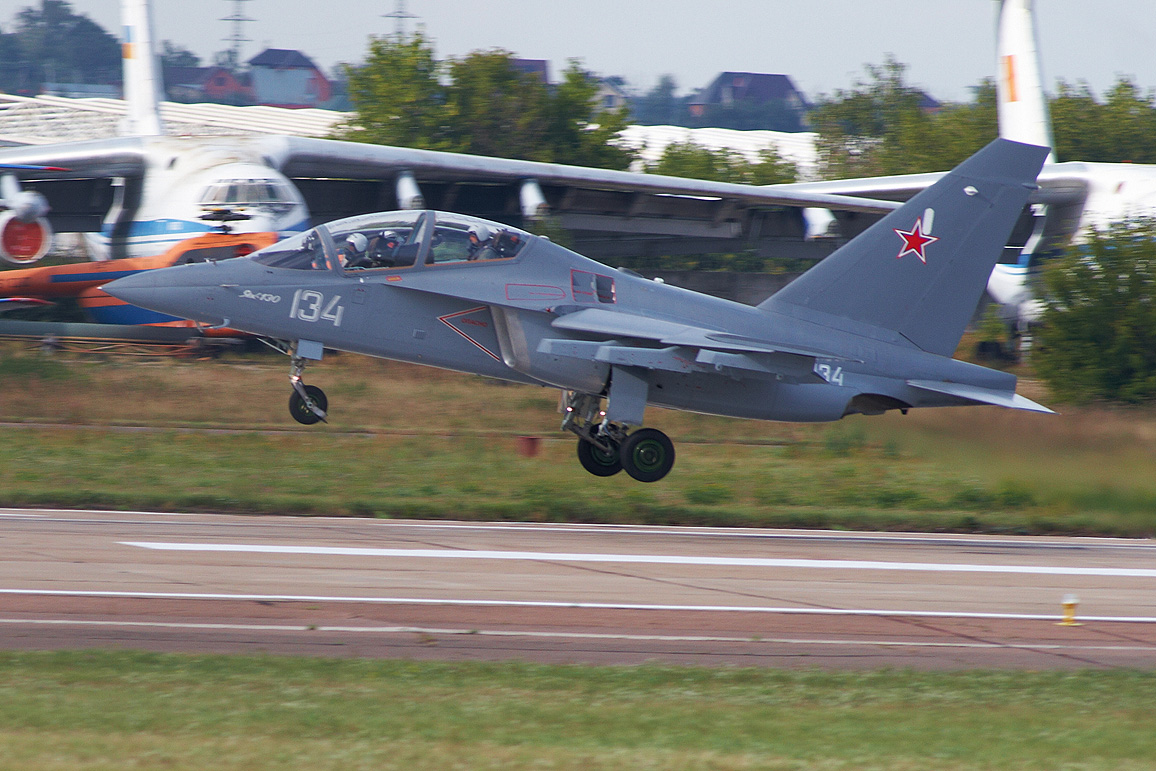
A Yak-130 at MAKS-2011

The first prototype, designated AEM/YAK-130D and registered as RA-43130, made its maiden flight on 25 April 1996 at Zhukovsky.

On 30 April 2004, the first preseries Yak-130, assembled at the Sokol plant in Nizhny Novgorod, performed its maiden flight. The plane was put on display for the first time at the Paris Air Show in June 2005. It was followed by three more preseries aircraft.

In December 2009, the aircraft completed state trials and was accepted for service in the Russian Air Force.

The Yak-130 has been used in combat in the internal conflict in Myanmar, at least since 2020. Its use has been criticised after verifiable evidence of military air strikes against civilians emerged online.

In the 2026 Iran war, Iran used its Yak-130s to complement MiG-29s in air defence duties over Tehran. An Israeli F-35 Adir was confirmed to have shot down a Yak-130, reportedly in Tehran airspace, making it the first crewed aircraft air-air killed for the F-35.

== Accidents and incidents ==
- 26 June 2006: A Yak-130 prototype crashed in the Ryazan region. Both pilots ejected safely without injuries.
- 29 May 2010: A preseries Yak-130 crashed at Lipetsk Air Base. The accident occurred during testing. Both pilots ejected; their condition was satisfactory. There were no casualties or injuries to people on the ground.
- 15 April 2014: A Yak-130 crashed in the Astrakhan region, 25 km from Akhtubinsk near the village of Bataevka. Both pilots ejected, but Lt. Col. Sergei Seregin was killed. The cause of the accident was a malfunction. The Yak-130 was owned by the 1080th Red Banner Aviation Centre for Retraining of Personnel named after V. P. Chkalov at Borisoglebsk. No casualties or damage to those on the ground were sustained.
- 11 July 2017: A Bangladesh Air Force Yakovlev Yak-130 crashed at Lohagara in Bangladesh's southeastern Chittagong District. Both pilots were unharmed.
- 27 December 2017: Two Bangladesh Air Force Yakovlev Yak-130s crashed at Maheshkhali Island in Cox's Bazar due to a mid-air collision. The official report states that the accident happened during the breaking of formation at a training exercise. All four pilots were rescued alive.
- 19 May 2021: A Belarusian Air Force Yakovlev Yak-130 crashed in Baranavichy, causing minor damage to one house in the city. Both pilots ejected, but were killed.
- 18 February 2022: Anti-Junta People's Defence Forces in Myanmar claimed they had damaged two Yak-130s at an air force base in Hmawbi.
- 29 June 2022: A Myanmar Air Force Yak-130 is believed to have been damaged following a bird strike.
- 9 May 2024: A Bangladesh Air Force Yak-130 crashed in Chattogram. Bangladeshi officials attributed the crash to a possible mechanical failure, although the CCTV footage of the incident appears to show the crash was caused by a high-risk stunt. The CCTV video shows the aircraft performing three aileron rolls while rapidly descending before impacting the runway right-side-up and without landing gear. The aircraft then caught fire and bounced upwards, taking off again. Both crew members ejected and were rescued alive. The pilot died in hospital, while the co-pilot sustained serious injuries.
- 3 October 2024: A Lao People's Liberation Army Air Force Yak-130 crashed during training exercise in Xiangkhouang Province. Both pilots died.
- 10 October 2024: A Russian Air Force Yak-130 crashed in Volgograd Oblast. The pilot ejected from the aircraft
- 6 November 2024: A Vietnam People's Air Force Yak-130, belonging to the 940th Air Training Regiment, crashed while conducting a training flight over the skies of Bình Định Province after being unable to land due to landing gear failure. Both pilots ejected from the aircraft and were rescued alive.
- 28 January 2026: A Vietnam People's Air Force Yak-130, belonging to the 940th Air Training Regiment, crashed while conducting a training flight in Đắk Lắk Province. The pilot ejected safely.
- 4 March 2026: An Israeli Air Force F-35I Adir shot down an Iranian Air Force Yakovlev Yak 130 over the skies of Tehran after the aircraft engaged in a dogfight.

== Variants ==
Yakovlev Yak-130D
Yak-130 prototype.
Yakovlev Yak-130
Basic dual-seat advanced trainer.
Yakovlev Yak-131

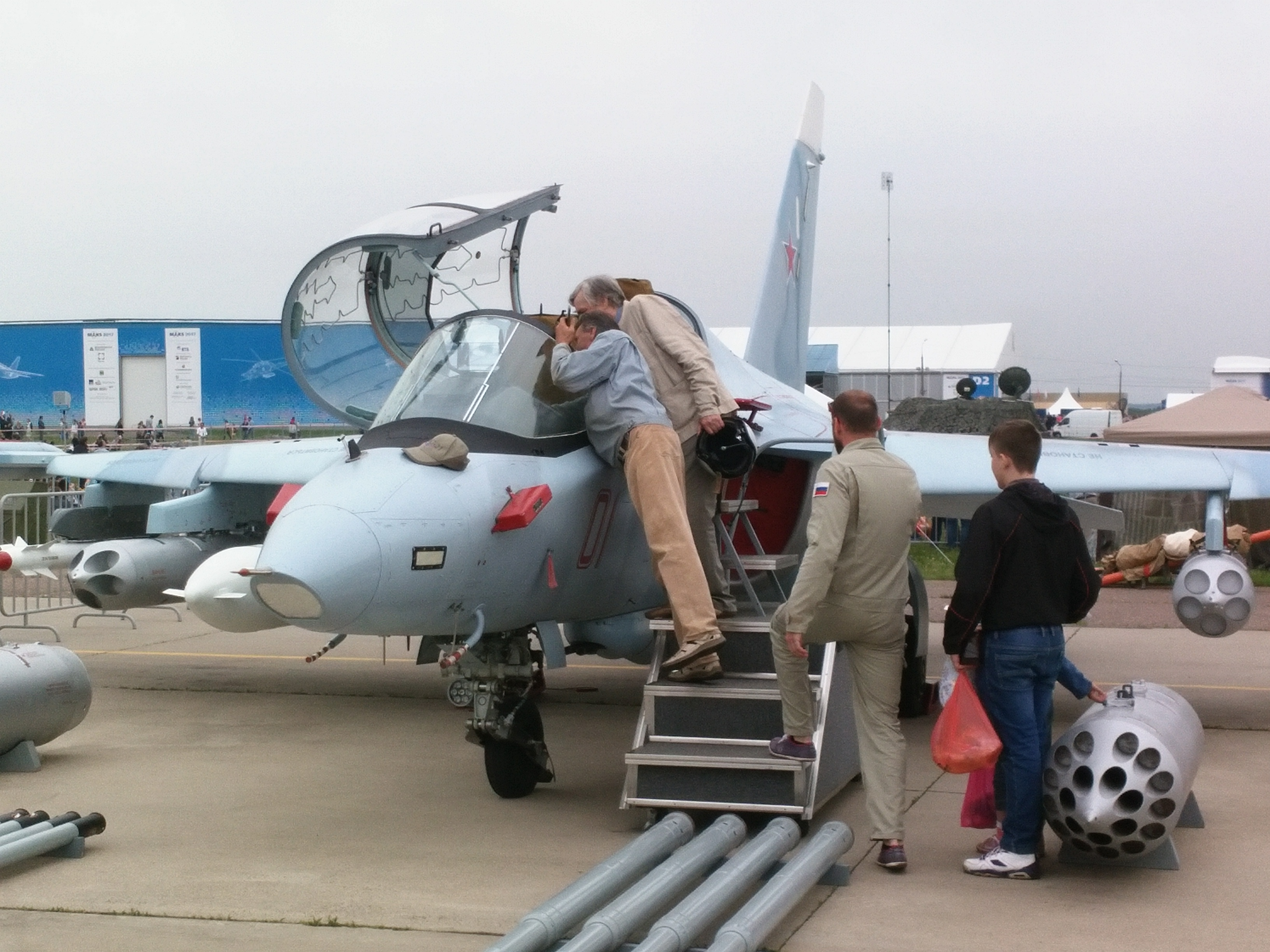
Yak-131

Light attack aircraft, designed as a replacement for the Sukhoi Su-25. This version will have cockpit and engine armour, a GSh-30-1 autocannon, and either the Phazotron Kopyo radar with mechanical or electronic beam scanning, or the Tikhomirov NIIP Osa passive phased array radar.
Yakovlev Yak-133
Light Strike Aircraft for LUS. The project was canceled in the early 1990s.
Yakovlev Yak-133IB
Fighter-bomber.
Yakovlev Yak-133PP
Electronic countermeasure platform.
Yakovlev Yak-133R
Tactical reconnaissance variant.
Yakovlev Yak-130M

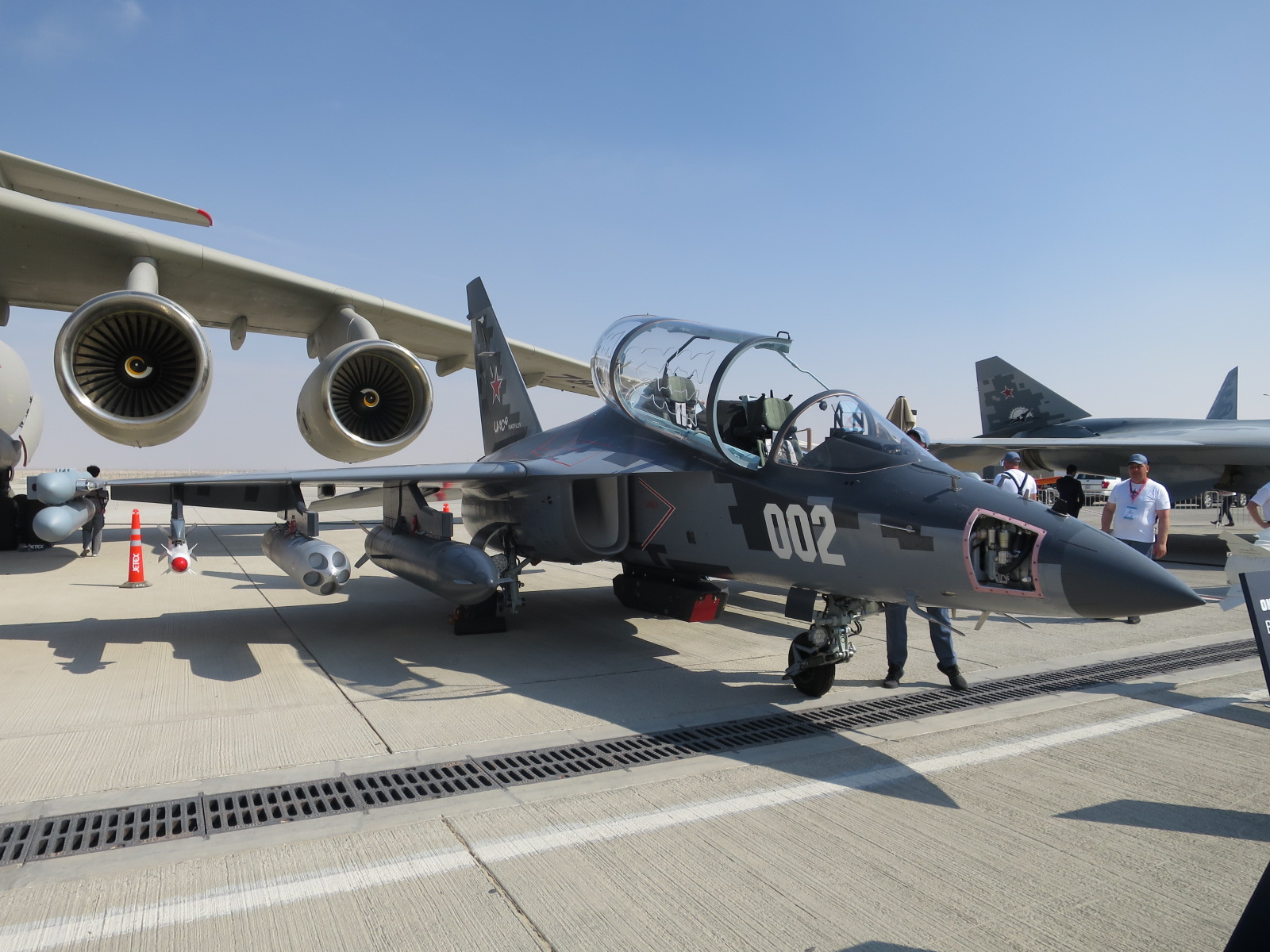
Yak-130M

Modernized version with more weapons and equipment which was unveiled in August 2024. The suite includes the BRLS-130R Airborne AESA radar, the SOLT-130K electro-optical/laser targeting system, the President-S130 self-protection suite, and the new KSS-130 communications link. This fit increases target detection range, improves weapons delivery accuracy, and strengthens resistance to electronic warfare. The podded defensive aids suite is intended to counter air- and surface-launched missile threats.

Modernization also targets the powerplant. At the Army-2023 forum, United Engine Corporation (UEC) unveiled the SM-100 engine, derived from the AI-222-25. The new engine delivers 20% higher thrust with no increase in weight or dimensions and doubles service life. The gains result from redesigned compressor, combustor, and turbine modules.

== Operators ==
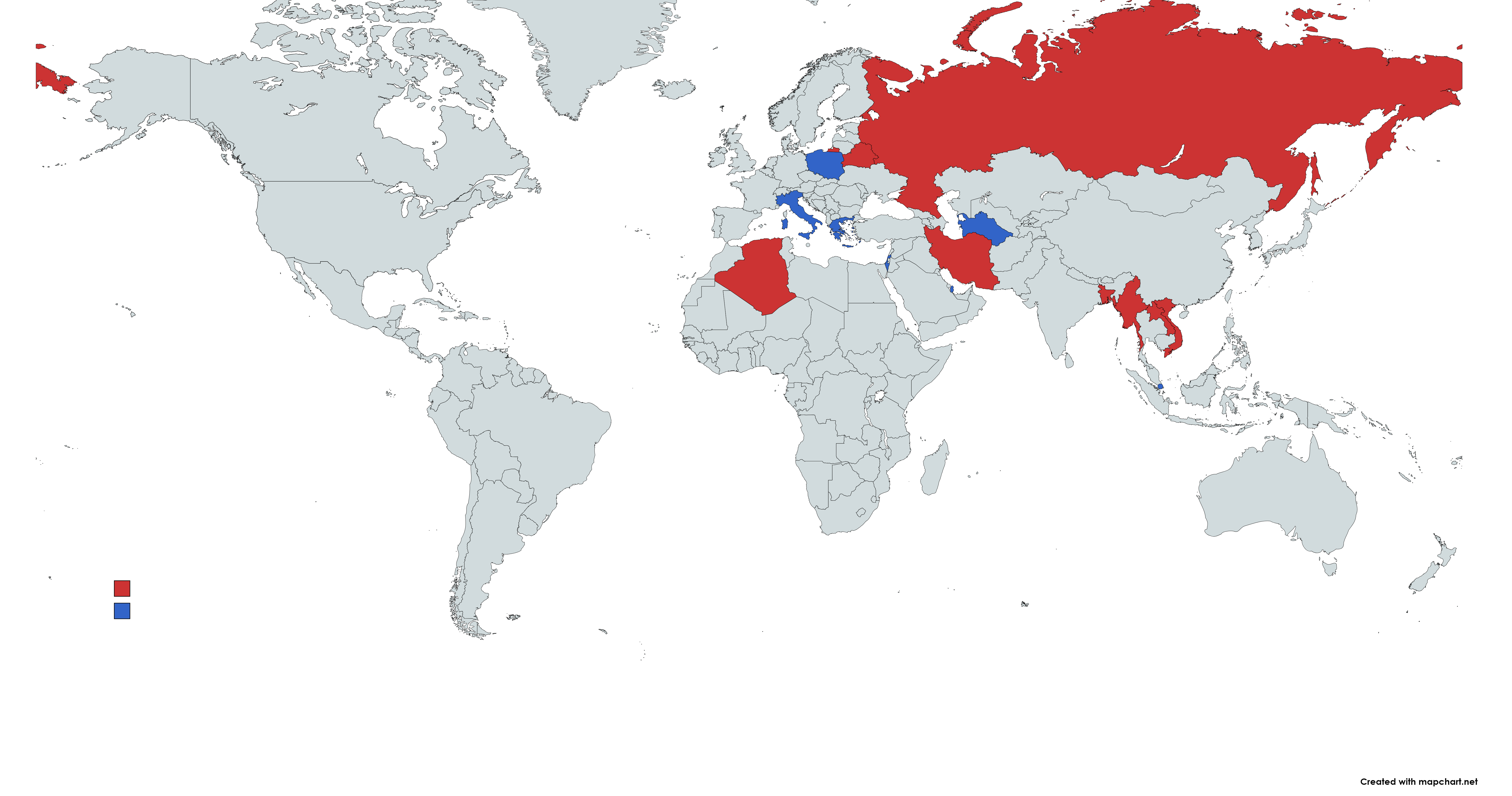
Operators of the Yak-130 (in red) and M-346 (in blue)

Algeria

- Algerian Air Force – 18 in service.

Bangladesh

- Bangladesh Air Force – 12 in service. Four lost in training accidents.

Belarus

- Belarusian Air Force – 11 in service. One lost in a training accident.

Ethiopia

- Ethiopian Air Force – 6 in service. 4 on order.

Iran

- Islamic Republic of Iran Air Force – operates an undisclosed number of Yak-130 jet trainer aircraft. One was shot down by an Israeli F-35I over Tehran.

Laos

- Lao People's Liberation Army Air Force – 3 in service. 6 on order. 1 lost in a training accident.

Myanmar

- Myanmar Air Force – 18 in service.

Russia

- Russian Aerospace Forces – 123 in service. 14 on order. 5 lost in training accidents.
- Russian Naval Aviation – 10 on order. To replace the Aero L-39.

Vietnam

- Vietnam Air Force Officer's College – 10 in service after having 2 losses due to training accident. Ordered more than 10 Yak-130M as the launch customer of the latest modernization according to unconfirmed reports.

== Specifications (Yak-130) ==

Data from YAK-130

General characteristics

- Crew: 2
- Length: 11.49 m (37 ft 8 in)
- Wingspan: 9.84 m (32 ft 3 in)
- Height: 4.76 m (15 ft 7 in)
- Wing area: 23.52 m^{2} (253.2 sq ft)
- Empty weight: 4,600 kg (10,141 lb)
- Gross weight: 7,250 kg (15,984 lb)
- Max takeoff weight: 10,290 kg (22,686 lb)
- Powerplant: 2 × Ivchenko-Progress AI-222-25 turbofan engines, 24.52 kN (5,510 lbf) thrust each

Performance

- Maximum speed: 1,060 km/h (660 mph, 570 kn)
- Cruise speed: 887 km/h (551 mph, 479 kn)
- Stall speed: 165 km/h (103 mph, 89 kn)
- Range: 2,100 km (1,300 mi, 1,100 nmi)
- Service ceiling: 12,500 m (41,000 ft)
- g limits: +8.0 −3.0
- Rate of climb: 65 m/s (12,800 ft/min)
- Wing loading: 276.4 kg/m^{2} (56.6 lb/sq ft)
- Thrust/weight: 0.70

Armament

- Guns: SNPU-130 gun pod
- Hardpoints: 8 (1 on each wingtip, usable only for flares/chaff, 3 under each wing) with a capacity of up to 3,000 kg (6,614 lb), with provisions to carry combinations of:
  - Rockets: 80 mm S-8 rocket, S-25 rocket
  - Missiles: R-73 infrared-homing short-range air-to-air missiles
  - Bombs: FAB-M62, ZB-500, KAB-500Kr

== See also ==
Related development

- Alenia Aermacchi M-346 Master

Aircraft of comparable role, configuration, and era

- AIDC T-5 Brave Eagle
- Boeing T-7 Red Hawk
- Hongdu L-15
- KAI T-50 Golden Eagle
- TAI Hürjet

== Sources ==
- Butowski, Piotr. "Russian T-Bird". Air International, Vol. 83 No. 3, September 2012. pp. 92–95. ISSN 0306-5634.
- Gunston, Bill. Yakovlev Aircraft since 1924. London: Putnam Aeronautical Books, 1997. ISBN 1-55750-978-6.
