= Sukhoi Su-28 =

Russian jet trainer aircraft

Su-28
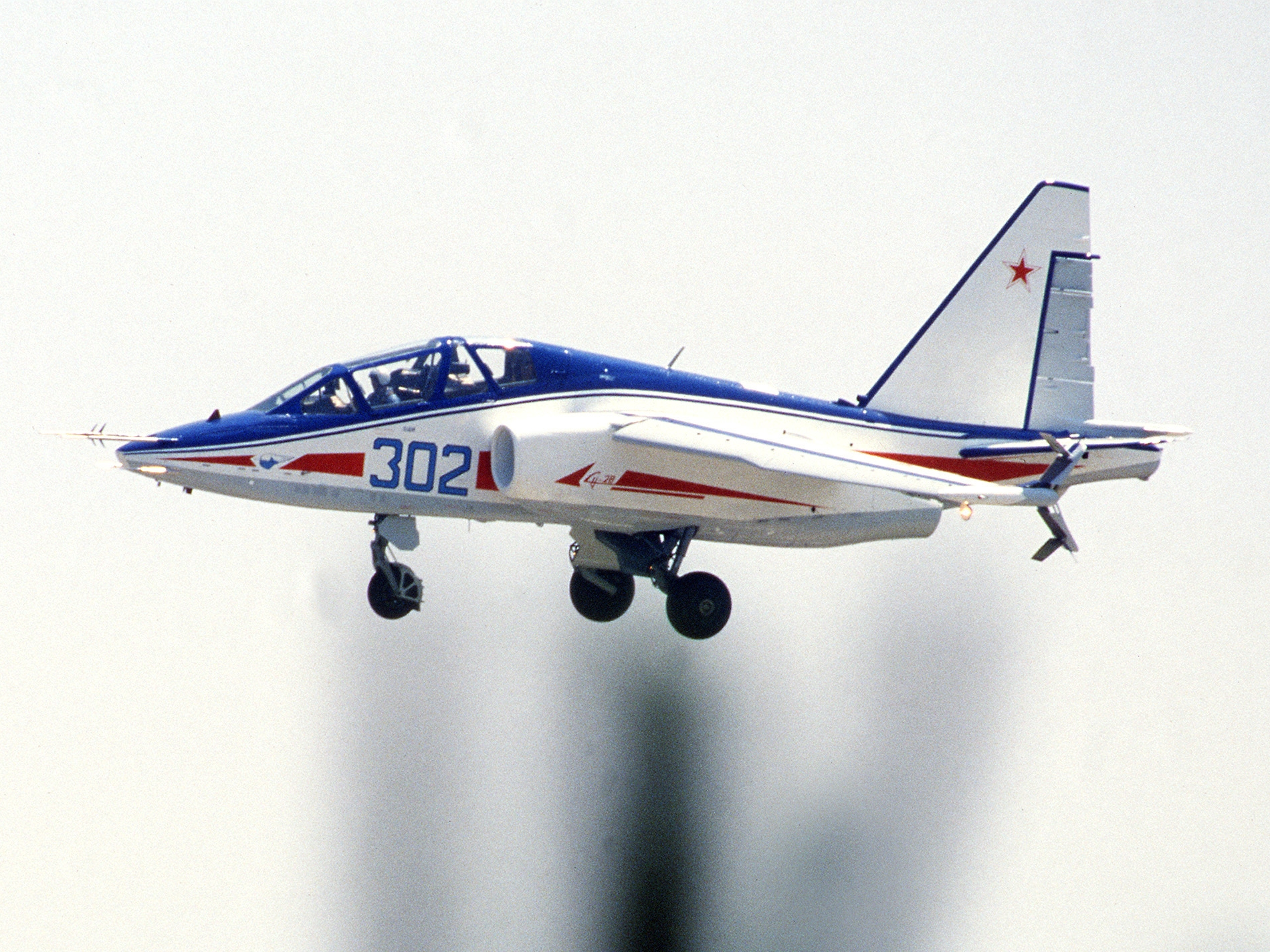
- Su-25UT Frogfoot

General information
- Type: Trainer
- Manufacturer: Sukhoi
- Primary user: Russian Air Force

History
- First flight: 1987; 38 years ago
- Developed from: Sukhoi Su-25

The Sukhoi Su-28 is a downgraded trainer variant of the Su-25UB / Su-25T, with reductions in avionics and aircraft systems, together with the elimination of all weapon-carrying capability. It was developed as a replacement for the Aero L-39 Albatros. The Su-28 trainer is intended for technical skill, general flight and formation flying training. It is also used as an aerobatic aircraft.

== Design and development ==
The Su-28 is a highly maneuverable and robust aircraft with the ability to perform take-off and landing with only one of its two engines running. The aircraft's engines can also run on a diesel based fuel as opposed to more traditional aviation fuel. Like the MiG-29, it also has the ability to operate from unpaved runways while maintaining high reliability and a low maintenance requirement. In addition, the Su-28 can withstand heavy landings, allowing it to be more forgiving in the training role. The range can be extended by up to four PTB-800 drop tanks, each of 800 L capacity.

Differences between the Su-28 and its parent Su-25UB model include the absence of targeting systems, weapon-operating systems, internal guns, wing pylons (used on military aircraft to mount weaponry such as bombs and missiles). It also lacks armor protection for the engines, electronic countermeasures and any systems dedicated to ground attack operations.

Sukhoi Su-28 on display.

== Operators ==
Russia

- Russian Air Force

== Specifications (Su-28) ==
Data from AirWar.ru

General characteristics

- Crew: 2
- Length: 15.36 m (50 ft 5 in)
- Wingspan: 14.36 m (47 ft 1 in)
- Height: 4.8 m (15 ft 9 in)
- Wing area: 33.7 m^{2} (363 sq ft)
- Empty weight: 4,500 kg (9,921 lb)
- Gross weight: 12,000 kg (26,455 lb)
- Max takeoff weight: 17,222 kg (37,968 lb)
- Fuel capacity: 2,750 kg (6,063 lb) internal + 4 × 1,150 kg (2,535 lb) drop tanks
- Powerplant: 2 × Tumansky TRD R-95Sh turbofan engines, 40 kN (9,000 lbf) thrust each

Performance

- Maximum speed: 950 km/h (590 mph, 510 kn)
- Range: 1,050 km (650 mi, 570 nmi) at high altitude, 560 km at low altitude
- Ferry range: 2,150 km (1,340 mi, 1,160 nmi)
- Service ceiling: 7,000 m (23,000 ft)
- g limits: +6
- Rate of climb: 85 m/s (16,700 ft/min)

== See also ==
- Sukhoi Su-25
