= Public holidays in Portugal =

In Portugal, a public holiday (Portuguese: feriado) is a calendar date, legally recognised and defined in the Labour Code as well as the Concordat of 2004, on which most businesses and non-essential services are closed. On some of these dates, public commemorative festivities are traditionally held.

Public holidays in Portugal are a mixture of select religious (Roman Catholic) observances and days that have national historical or cultural significance. These dates have changed over time: currently, there are 13 mandatory holidays and one optional (Carnival) that has to be specifically designated as a day off work (Portuguese: tolerância de ponto) each year by government decree (for public servants) or companies (for private sector). Specific dates may alternatively be observed only at region or municipal level. Collective bargaining can specify that optional holidays are observed always and are also free for agreeing other dates that the specific company or sector agrees to observe as a holiday (e.g. bank holidays).

== Public holidays in Portugal ==
Date	English name	Portuguese name	Notes	Continental Portugal	Autonomous Regions of Portugal	
Date	English name	Portuguese name	Notes	(Portugal)	(Madeira)	(Azores)
moveable	Municipal holiday	Feriado Municipal	Public holiday established by each municipality, limited to its own territory, in general to celebrate the patron saint of the municipality, or the date of the establishment of the municipal autonomy	check	check	check
1 January	New Year's Day	Ano Novo		check	check	check
moveable	Carnival	Carnaval	Carnival in Portugal is an annual festival that ends on Shrove Tuesday (called Fat Tuesday in Madeira - Terça-feira Gorda in Portuguese) the day before Ash Wednesday (first day of Lent). This is an optional holiday, although it is usually observed. 47 days before Easter Sunday.	check	check	check
moveable	Good Friday	Sexta-feira Santa	Friday before Easter Sunday. Last observed 3 April 2026	check	check	check
moveable	Easter Sunday	Domingo de Páscoa	Last observed 5 April 2026	check	check	check
2 April	Madeira's Autonomy Day	Dia da Autonomia	The date marks the approval of the 1976 Constitution, which recognized the political and administrative autonomy of the archipelagos of Madeira and the Azores.	No	check	No
25 April	Freedom Day	Dia da Liberdade	Celebrates the 1974 coup d'état that ended the Estado Novo government and established the Portuguese Third Republic.	check	check	check
1 May	Labour Day	Dia do Trabalhador		check	check	check
moveable	Corpus Christi	Corpo de Deus	60 days after Easter Sunday, a Thursday. Last observed 4 June 2026	check	check	check
moveable	Autonomous Region of Azores Day (Whit Monday)	Dia da Região Autónoma dos Açores Dia da Pombinha Dia do Bodo	Only celebrated in Azores.	No	No	check
10 June	Portugal Day	Dia de Portugal, de Camões e das Comunidades Portuguesas	National Day. Commemorates the death of national poet Luís de Camões in 1580.	check	check	check
1 July	Autonomous Region of Madeira and Madeiran Communities Day	Dia da Região Autónoma da Madeira e das Comunidades Madeirenses	Only celebrated in Madeira.	No	check	No
15 August	Assumption Day	Assunção de Nossa Senhora		check	check	check
5 October	Republic Day	Implantação da República	Celebrates the end of Monarchy and the beginning of the Portuguese Republic.	check	check	check
1 November	All Saints Day	Dia de Todos-os-Santos		check	check	check
1 December	Restoration of Independence	Restauração da Independência	Celebrates the end of the Philippine Dynasty (1580–1640).	check	check	check
8 December	Immaculate Conception	Imaculada Conceição		check	check	check
25 December	Christmas Day	Natal		check	check	check
26 December	1st Octave	Primeira Oitava	Only celebrated in Madeira. – Primeira Oitava is part of Madeira's centuries old Christmas celebrations which has been recognized as public holiday by the Regional Government of Madeira, celebrating the second day of the week leading up to New Year's Day.	No	check	No
Total holidays				15	18	16

== Revoked holidays in 2013–2015 ==
In 2012, the XIX Constitutional Government of Portugal controversially revoked four holidays – two civilian holidays (Republic Day and Restoration of Independence) and two religious ones (Corpus Christi and All Saints Day). The move was effective from 2013 onwards and was presented as a measure to increase productivity, in the context of the 2011–2014 Troika bailout to Portugal (even though that measure was never requested by the Memorandum of Understanding). Public debate and re-evaluation were scheduled in 2018 for the religious holidays.

The four holidays were eventually restored by the XXI Constitutional Government of Portugal, in January 2016.

== Local holidays ==
According to a Decree of 12 October 1910, municipalities were given the possibility of choosing a day that would represent their traditional festivals.

Date	English name	Portuguese name	Notes
15 January	Municipal Holiday	Dia do Concelho	Celebrated in Santa Cruz.
20 January	Municipal Holiday	Dia do S. Sebastião	Celebrated in Santa Maria da Feira, Aveiro.
22 January	Municipal Holiday	Dia do Concelho	Celebrated in São Vicente.
18 February	Municipal Holiday	Dia do Concelho	Celebrated in Valença.
19 March	Saint Joseph's Day	Dia de São José	Celebrated in Santarém.
11 April	Municipal Holiday	Dia do Concelho	Celebrated in Lagoa; the locality was made a town by Royal Charter of 11 April 1522.
23 April	Saint George's Day	Dia de São Jorge.	Velas has celebrated Saint George's Day since 1460.
moveable	Easter Monday	Segunda-feira de Páscoa	Celebrated in Avis, Borba, Caminha, Campo Maior, Cuba, Freixo de Espada à Cinta, Ílhavo, Mação, Mora, Penamacor, Ponte de Sor, Portel, Redondo, Castelo de Vide, Constância, Crato, Nisa and Sousel. 6 April in 2026.
moveable	Ascension of Jesus	Quinta-feira da Ascensão	Celebrated in Alcanena, Alenquer, Almeirim, Alter do Chão, Alvito, Anadia, Ansião, Arraiolos, Arruda dos Vinhos, Azambuja, Beja, Benavente, Cartaxo, Chamusca, Estremoz, Golegã, Loulé, Mafra, Marinha Grande, Mealhada, Melgaço, Monchique, Mortágua, Oliveira do Bairro, Quarteira, Salvaterra de Magos, Santa Comba Dão, Sobral de Monte Agraço, Torres Novas, Vidigueira and Vila Franca de Xira.
Fifth Sunday after Easter (moveable)	Municipal Holiday	Dia do Concelho	Celebrated in Ponta Delgada.
8 May	Municipal Holiday	Dia do Concelho	Celebrated in Murça, the anniversary of the municipal autonomy issued by the foral on 8 May 1224.
12 May	Municipal Holiday	Dia de Santa Joana Princesa	Celebrated in Aveiro.
25 May	Municipal Holiday	Dia do Concelho	Celebrated in Santana, the anniversary of the date of elevation of the village and county seat in 1835.
13 June	St. Anthony's Day	Dia de Santo António	Celebrated in Lisbon. On the Avenida da Liberdade there are Marchas, parades of folklore and costumes from the city's different traditional quarters, with hundreds of singers and dancers and a vast audience applauding their favorite participants. As St Anthony is the matchmaker saint, it is traditional in Lisbon for 200–300 marriages to take place on this day.
16 June	Municipal Holiday	Dia do Concelho	Celebrated in Olhão, the date of the start of Olhão's revolt against Napoleon.
20 June	Municipal Holiday	Dia do Concelho	Celebrated in Corvo, the anniversary of the town.
24 June	St. John's Day	Dia de São João	Celebrated in Porto, Braga, Figueira da Foz, Almada, Calheta, Porto Santo, Angra do Heroísmo, Horta, Santa Cruz da Graciosa, Santa Cruz das Flores, Vila do Porto and Vila Franca do Campo (as a Municipal Holiday). Porto and Braga celebrate with a big festival and fireworks over the River Douro (in Porto) and down Avenida da Liberdade (in Braga). Across the region a traditional midsummer bonfire is also built, and following an ancient pagan tradition revelers try to jump over the bonfire for protection during the rest of the year.
29 June	St. Peter's Day	Dia de São Pedro	Celebrated in Alfândega da Fé, Bombarral, Castro Daire, Castro Verde, Évora, Felgueiras, Macedo de Cavaleiros, Montijo, Penedono, Porto de Mós, Póvoa de Varzim, Ribeira Brava, Ribeira Grande, São Pedro do Sul, Seixal and Sintra. Like St. Anthony's Day and St. John's Day, St. Peter's Day is celebrated with a traditional midsummer bonfire, which people jump over, and perform a tradition known as "Queimar a Alcachofra" (Burn the Artichoke) which symbolizes the "Good Which Fulfill".
4 July	St. Elizabeth's Day	Dia de Santa Isabel	Celebrated in Coimbra
Third Monday of July (moveable)	Municipal Holiday	Dia do Concelho	Celebrated in Lajes das Flores.
18 July	Municipal Holiday	Dia do Concelho	Celebrated in Nordeste, the date the locality was made a town by Royal Charter of 18 July 1514.
22 July	Municipal Holiday	Dia do Concelho	Celebrated in Porto Moniz and Madalena.
26 July	Municipal Holiday	Dia do Concelho	Celebrated in Loures, which was made a municipal seat on 26 July 1886, replacing Olivais.
11 August	Municipal Holiday	Dia do Concelho	Celebrated in Praia da Vitória, the anniversary of the 1829 battle that prevented the royalists from reaching land in the Portuguese Civil War.
16 August	Municipal Holiday	Dia do Concelho	Celebrated in São Roque do Pico.
20 August	Municipal Holiday	Dia do Concelho	Celebrated in Viana do Castelo.
21 August	Funchal City Day	Dia da Cidade do Funchal	Celebrated in Funchal, the date on which, in 1508 the town of Funchal was elevated to the category of city by Royal Charter,.
8 September	Nativity of Mary	Natividade de Nossa Senhora	Celebrated in Lagoa, Alcoutim, Ponta do Sol, Lamego, Mangualde, Marco de Canaveses, Marvão, Montemor-o-Velho, Murtosa, Nazaré, Odemira, Ourique, Peniche and Sabrosa.
21 September	St. Matthew's Day	Dia de São Mateus	Celebrated in Viseu, and Elvas
Monday after the first the Sunday of September (moveable)	Municipal Holiday	Dia do Concelho	Celebrated in Povoação.
4 October	Municipal Holiday	Dia do Concelho	Celebrated in Câmara de Lobos, the date of the first election and taking power of the municipal chamber, in 1835.
9 October	Municipal Holiday	Dia do Concelho	Celebrated in Machico, the anniversary of the date in 1803 of the worst natural calamity that occurred on the island of Madeira since its settlement, a flood that killed hundreds of people. A pilgrimage to the Lord of Miracles is held.
19 November	Municipal Holiday	Dia do Concelho	Celebrated in Odivelas and Trofa; both localities were made municipal seats on 19 November 1998, becoming autonomous from the municipalities of Loures and Santo Tirso, respectively.
25 November	Saint Catherine's Day	Dia de Santa Catarina	Celebrated in Calheta, since time immemorial. Declared an official holiday in August 1960.
