= Public holidays in the Cook Islands =

The following are public holidays in the Cook Islands, as prescribed by the Public Holidays Act 1999.

Date	Name	Remarks
1-2 January	New Year's Day	
moveable	Good Friday	
moveable	Easter Monday	
25 April	Anzac Day	
First Monday in June	King's Birthday	Celebrated on the same day as New Zealand celebrates the holiday.
First Friday in July	Ra o te Ui Ariki	
4 August	Constitution Day	This marks the date in 1965 when this event was first celebrated.
26 October	Gospel Day	Christianity was first brought to the islands in the 1820s by John Williams of the London Missionary Society.
25 December	Christmas Day	
26 December	Boxing Day	

Also, the regions observe the following regional holidays. Most of the populated islands celebrate their own Gospel Days:

Date	Atoll/Island	Name
13 March	Penrhyn Island	Penrhyn Gospel Day
25 May	Palmerston Island	Palmerston Gospel Day
15 June	Mangaia	Mangaia Gospel Day
20 July	Atiu	Atiu Gospel Day
21 July	Mitiaro	Mitiaro Gospel Day
25 July	Rarotonga	Rarotonga Gospel Day
8 August	Manihiki	Manihiki Gospel Day
15 August	Rakahanga	Rakahanga Gospel Day
27 October	Aitutaki	Aitutaki Gospel Day
8 December	Pukapuka	Pukapuka Gospel Day
