= Public holidays in Venezuela =

The table below shows a list of the most notable holidays in Venezuela. Popular and public holidays are included in the list.

Other public holidays may be observed. In 2019, several days were announced as national holidays based on widespread blackouts.

| Date | Local name | English name |
|---|---|---|
| January 1 | Día de Año Nuevo | New Year's Day |
| Monday and Tuesday before Ash Wednesday | Carnaval | Carnival |
| From Palm Sunday to Easter (movable) | Semana Santa | Holy Week |
| April 19 | Declaración de la Independencia | Declaration of Independence |
| May 1 | Día del Trabajador | Labour Day |
| June 24 | Batalla de Carabobo | Battle of Carabobo |
| July 5 | Día de la Independencia | Independence Day |
| July 24 | Natalicio del Libertador | Simon Boliviar's Birthday |
| October 12 | Día de la Resistencia Indígena | Day of Indigenous Resistance |
| December 24 | Nochebuena | Christmas Eve |
| December 25 | Navidad | Christmas Day |
| December 31 | Nochevieja | New Year's Eve |

== Popular holidays ==
| Date | Local name | English name |
|---|---|---|
| January 14 | Día de la Divina Pastora | Feast of the Divina Pastora |
| January 15 | Día del Maestro | Teachers' Day |
| February 12 | Día de la Juventud | Youth Day |
| February 20 | Dia de la Federacion | Federation Day |
| March 8 | Dia Internacional de la Mujer | International Women's Day |
| March 21 | Día del abolición de la esclavitud | Slavery Abolition Anniversary |
| March 28 | Día Nacional del Patrimonio Cultural | National Cultural Patrimonies Day |
| March 31 | Aniversario del fundacion del San Cristóbal | Foundation anniversary Day of San Cristóbal, Táchira |
| May 3 | Día del Cruz del Mayo | Fiesta de las Cruces |
| Second Sunday of May | Dia de las Madres | Mother's Day |
| May 25 | Día del Himno Nacional | National Anthem Day |
| Third Sunday of June | Dia de los Padres | Father's Day |
| June 27 | Día del Periodista y Aniversario de la instauración del Decreto de Instrucción pública gratuita y obligatoria | Journalists' Day and the Anniversary of the 1872 Public Education Decree |
| Third Sunday of July (movable) | Dia del niño | Children's Day |
| July 24 | Dia de la Armada Nacional | Navy Day and the anniversary of the Battle of Lake Maracaibo |
| July 25 | Aniversario del fundacion del Caracas | Caracas City Foundation Day |
| August 3 | Día de la Bandera | Flag Day |
| August 4 | Día de la Guardia Nacional | National Guard Day |
| September 8 | Día del Virgen del Valle | Birth of the Blessed Virgin Mary, feast of the Virgen del Valle |
| September 24 | Día del Virgen de las Mercedes | Feast of the Our Lady of Mercy |
| November 2 | Día de los fieles difuntos | All Souls' Day |
| November 17 to November 19 | Feria de la Chinita | Feria of La Chinita |
| November 21 | Día del estudiante universitario | University Students' Day |
| December 8 | Dia de la Lealtad | Loyalty Day |
| December 10 | Día de la Aviacion Militar | Air Force Day |
| December 17 | Aniversario de la muerte de Libertador Simón Bolívar | Simon Bolivar Memorial Day |
