= July Morning =

Annual festival in Bulgaria

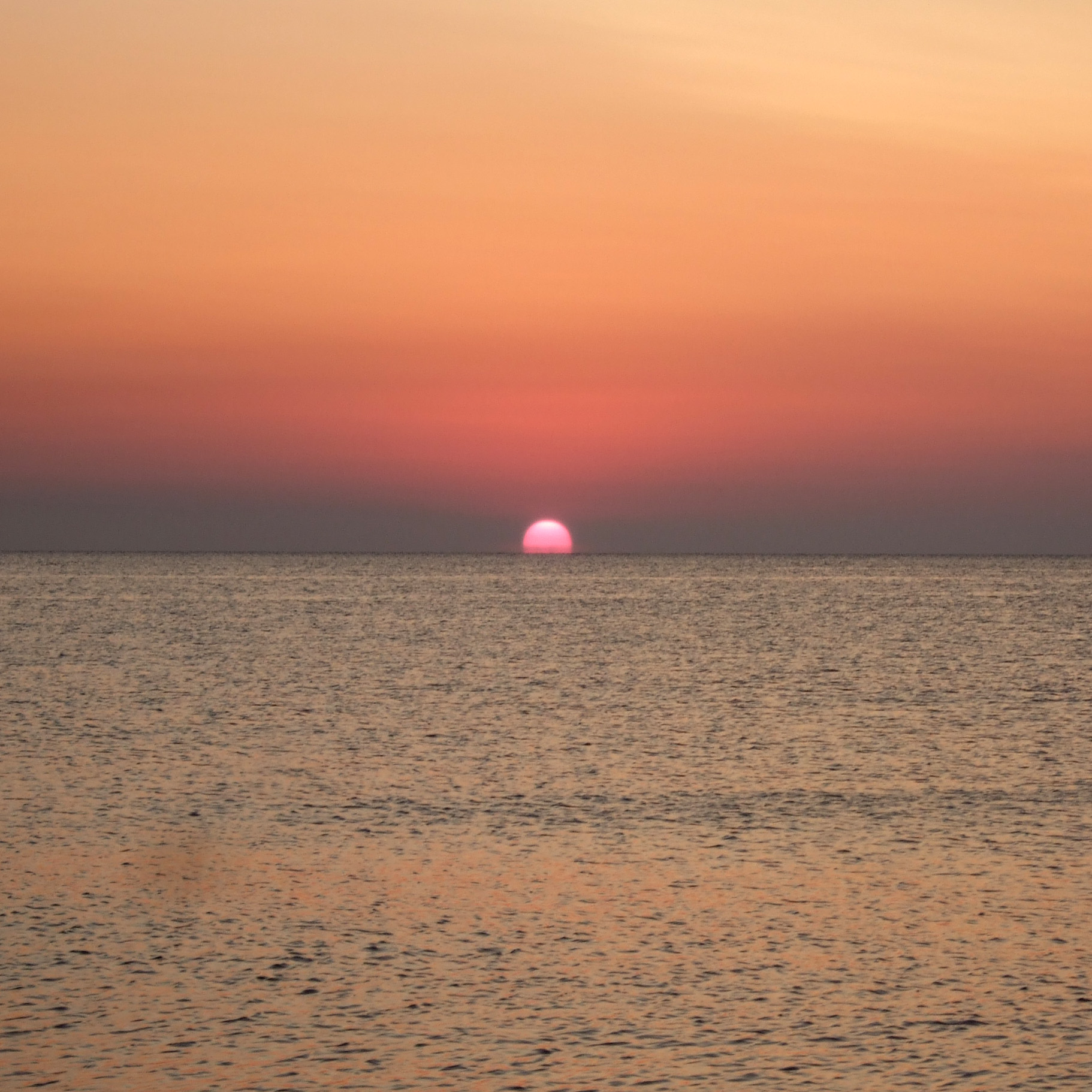
The sun rising over the Black Sea on the morning of 1 July

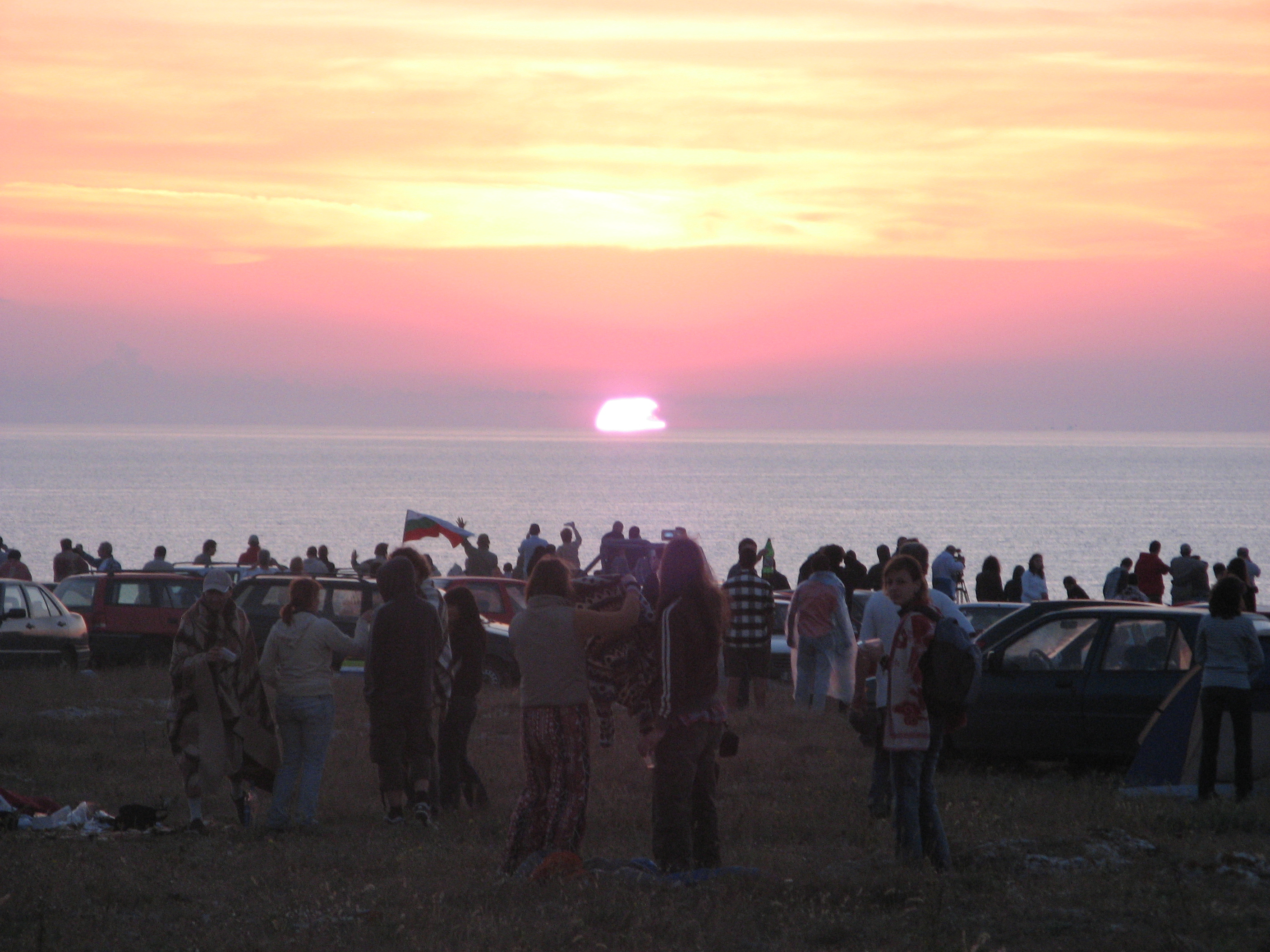
July Morning 2007 at Kamen Bryag with ex-Uriah Heep's John Lawton

July Morning is an annual Bulgarian festival, celebrated on the night before and the first day of July, in which thousands of people from around the country travel to the Black Sea coast or the Danube River to watch the first sunrise of July. The tradition began in 1985 in Varna, taking its name from the British progressive rock band Uriah Heep's 1971 hit "July Morning".

== History ==
Although "July Morning" was released in 1971, it was only in the 1980s that it became popular in Bulgaria, via the spread of black-market vinyls. Due to social and cultural restrictions of the time, the song gained massive underground appeal as a protest song anthem.

The first "July Morning" festival took place in 1985, in Varna, as a form of protest against the regime. A soldier who had previously been assigned overnight guard duty from the night of June 30th into July 1st believed that no one should welcome the first morning of July alone, and so invited his friends to spend that night celebrating together. In 1986, word of the celebration spread at a jazz festival in Sopot, and thousands of people descended on Varna for July Morning. Poet Raycho Angelov describes one of the early July Morning celebrations:

What I remember is how people didn’t stop singing and dancing all night, 20-30 people played acoustic guitars all along the shore near the Varna lighthouse. People made love, not war. Me included. Some were passing by, others were like mystics meditating, and some just slept despite the cacophony. It was in the spirit of the 'monkey dance' of life, in the words of Jack Kerouac.

Since then, the tradition has spread across the country (possibly galvanized by Uriah Heep's 1988 concert, who were one of the first Western bands to perform in Bulgaria). After the fall of communism in Bulgaria, the July Morning festival has been increasingly commodified and dissociated from its hippie, countercultural beginnings, and is now seen mostly as a celebration of summer and a chance for social gatherings.

== Celebrations ==
On the evening of June 30th, usually beginning around sunset, the beaches where July Morning is happening host open-air rock festivals that run until sunrise. As the event has grown larger, well-known musicians are often invited to headline these events: John Lawton, Uriah Heep's vocalist, performed for the July Morning festival at Kamen Bryag from 2006 to 2015; Joe Lynn Turner, Jersey Budd, and Jeff Scott Soto have led other celebrations, along with Bulgarian bands such as Tangra and Samuel Manuelyan.

As the sun rises over the water, "July Morning" is played over the speakers, and the crowds present sing along.
