= Tangra (band) =

Bulgarian rock band

Tangra Тангра
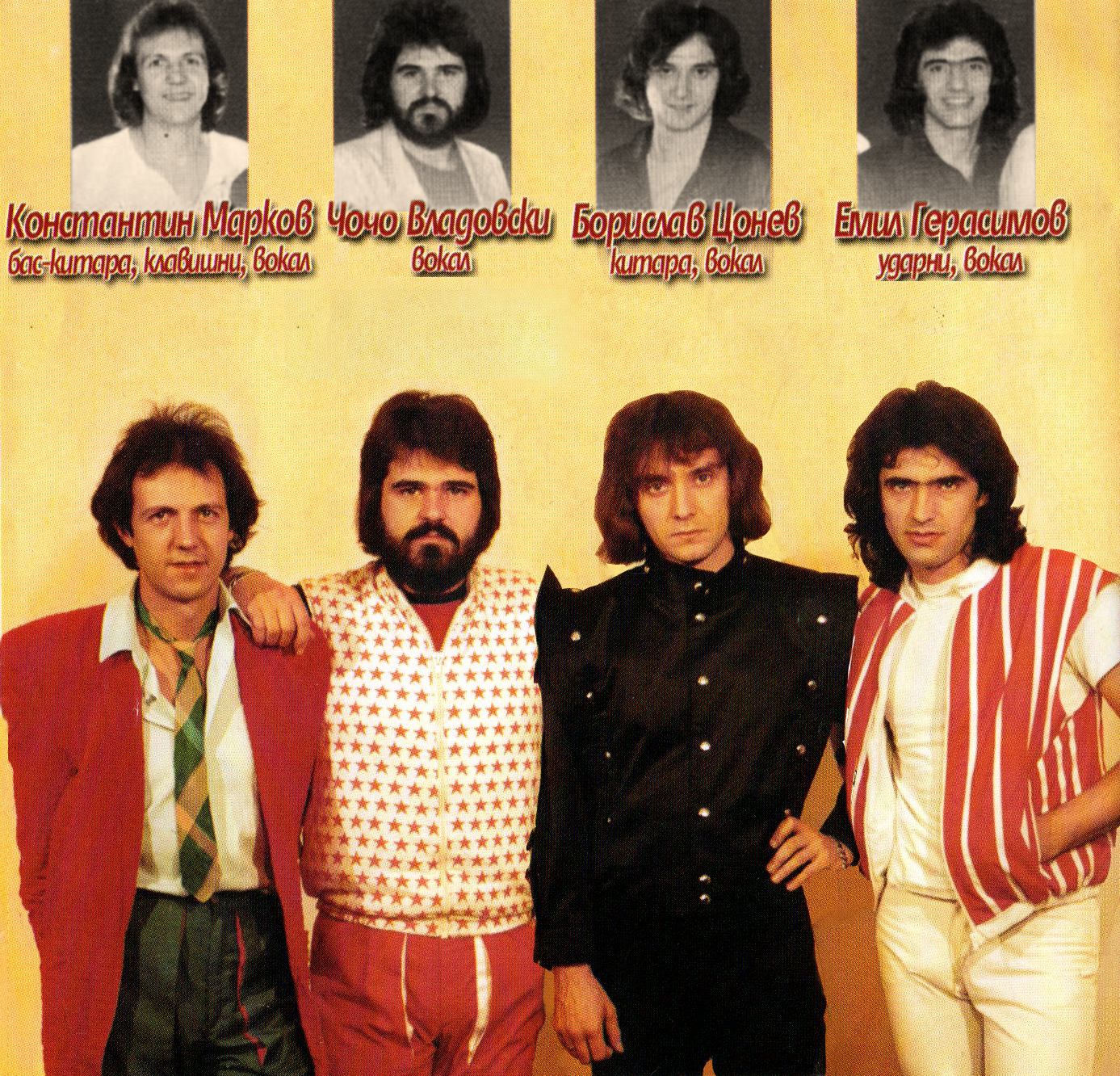

Background information
- Origin: Sofia, Bulgaria
- Genres: Rock; pop rock; new wave
- Years active: 1976–1990; (2016–present)
- Labels: Balkanton

Tangra (Bulgarian: Тангра) is a Bulgarian rock band founded in 1976 in Sofia, Bulgaria. The group is one of the most popular Bulgarian rock bands from the '80s, '90s and nowadays.

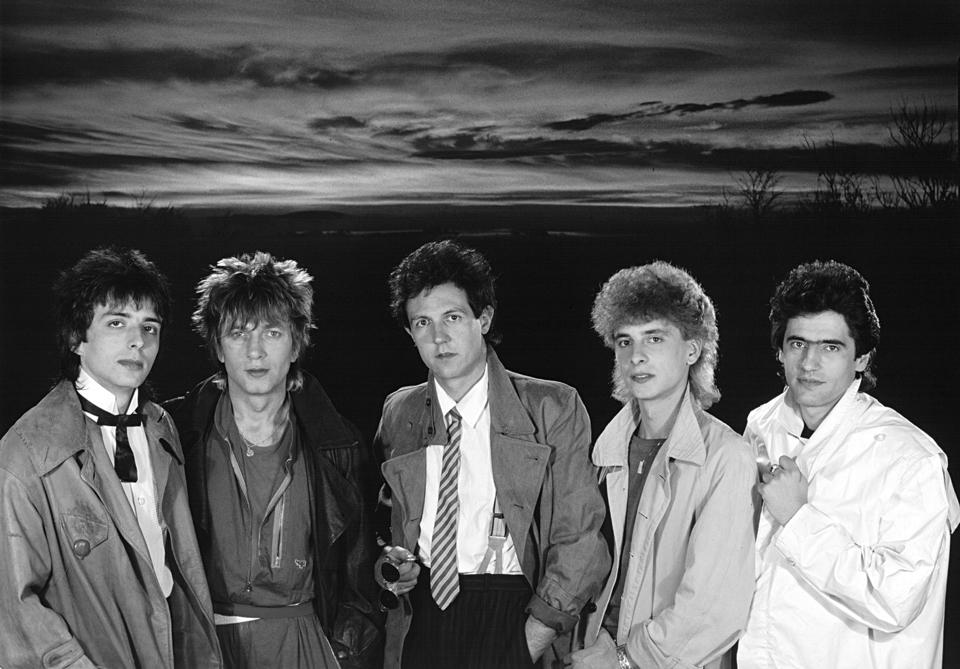
Tangra II

== History ==
Founders of the band are the musicians: Borislav Panov (keyboard) former member of "Shturcite" band who gave the name "TANGRA" to the band, Konstantin Markov (bass guitar), Alexander Petrunov (vocal), Vasil Naydenov (piano) and Marcel Baruch (drums). The band accompanied the singers Yordanka Hristova, Bogdana Karadocheva and other pop singers in their concerts. In 1978 they released the band's first album with the songs "Ако имаш време"(If You have time) and "Пътища"(Roads). In 1979, Cvetan Vladovski was invited to be the new vocalist of the group. Anton Bubev was drummer after Marcel Baruch left the band. Since 1981 Emil Gerasimov has been the band's drummer. The release of the LP Nashiat Grad in 1982 brought national recognition and put the band on the map. This record contained the greatest hits of TANGRA band. Songs from this album such as "Nashiat Grad", "Bogatstvo", and "Liubovta bez koyato ne mojem" have become like national anthems. The musicians who made it happen were Tsvetan Vladovski (CHOCHO), a former member of "Diana Express" band, on vocals and the flute; Borislav Tzonev also a former member of "Diana Express" on lead guitar and vocals; Emil Gerasimov on drums and percussion; and Konstantin Markov on bass guitar. In the fall of 1983, the band split. Chocho Vladovski and guitar player Borislav Tzonev quit, leaving the other two members to form a new band in 1984. Yordan "Dani" Ganchev was added as keyboard player. Tangra changed their melodic rock style to the more popular genre at the time, new wave.

The 1980s started the second period of creativity for Tangra. The third period came with coming of Yordan Ganchev – "Dani" (piano), Valeri Milovanski, guitar and Stanislav Slanev, vocals. After 1989 the band, which renamed itself Tangra 2, started to perform in Scandinavia and elsewhere in Europe. Nevertheless, Tangra 2 has never reached the mass popularity of the previous formation. The lyrics of the poet Alexander Petrov played a significant role in both bands "Tangra" and "Tangra 2".

== Discography ==
- Нашият град ("Our Town") (1982)
- Тангра II ("Tangra II") (1986)
- Тангра - антология част 1 и 2 ("Tangra - Part 1 and 2") (2000)

== Awards ==
- 1978 – First place from Youth Pop Song Competition, Bulgaria with the song "Ако имаш време" ("If You Have Time")
- 1979 – First place from Youth Pop Song Competition, Bulgaria with the song "Очакване" ("Expectation")
- 1985 – First place from Youth Pop Song Competition, Bulgaria with the song "Оловният войник" ("Tin Soldier")
