= Collector Car Appreciation Day =

Collector Car Appreciation Day Logo

Collector Car Appreciation Day (CCAD) is an annual celebration to raise awareness of the role automotive restoration and collection plays in American society. The day was first recognized on July 9, 2010, due, in part, to U.S. Senate resolution S. Res 513, sponsored by Senators Jon Tester (D-MT) and Richard Burr (R-NC).

Hundreds of events were staged nationwide to celebrate the first CCAD. Thousands attended events ranging from car cruises and shows to small-business open houses and “drive your car to work” displays. The effort was organized by the Specialty Equipment Market Association (SEMA) and its Automotive Restoration Market Organization (ARMO) and Hot Rod Industry Alliance (HRIA) Councils, acknowledged the importance of the automobile in American culture as the inspiration for much music, literature, photography, cinema, fashion and other artistic pursuits.

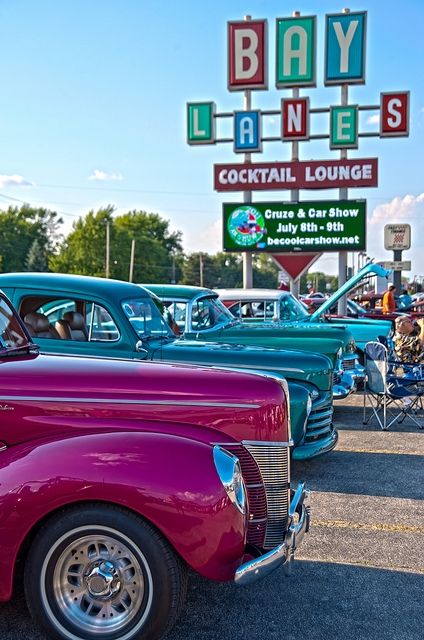
Collector Car Appreciation Day 2011

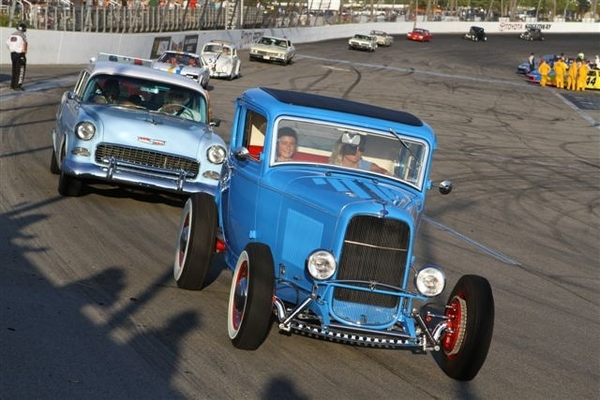
Collector Car Appreciation Day at Toyota Speedway

The SEMA Action Network (SAN), SEMA’s grassroots enthusiast network maintains a list of scheduled events to commemorate Collector Car Appreciation Day.

== Previous dates ==
Previous dates
Year	Date	Notes	Reference
2010	July 9	First Collector Car Appreciation Day	
2011	July 8	Senate Resolution 154 (S. Res. 154)	
2012	July 13		
2013	July 12		held on July 12, 2013
2014			
2015			
2016			
2017	July 14		
2018	July 13		Per SEMA Action Network (SAN) site
2019	July 12		Per SEMA Action Network (SAN) site
