= Imamat Day =

Holiday celebrated by Nizari Ismaili Shi'i Muslims

Imamat Day, also known as Khushali, is celebrated by Nizari Ismaili Shiʿi Muslims to mark the anniversary of the day that their present (Hazar) Imam Aga Khan V succeeded his predecessor to become the Imam of the Time. It is related to the concept of the imamah.

The Aga Khan IV was the 49th Imam of the Ismailis, having succeeded his grandfather, the Aga Khan III on July 11, 1957. His Imamat Day was therefore previously observed annually on July 11.

Recognizing the Imam of the Time is central to Ismailis' faith and belief. Imamat Day provides an occasion to reinforce this and to express gratitude to the Imam who, in keeping with the centuries-old tradition of leadership, provides guidance in matters of faith, and works to improve the quality and security of their lives. It is a day to reaffirm their spiritual allegiance to the Imam and renew their commitment to the ethics of their faith.
