= National Ice Cream Month =

Month-long observance in July

In the United States, National Ice Cream Month is celebrated each year in July, and National Ice Cream Day is celebrated on the third Sunday in July.

The celebrations were originated by Joint resolution 298 in the United States Senate, which was sponsored by Senator Walter Dee Huddleston of Kentucky on May 17, 1984, and Joint resolution 543 in the United States House of Representatives, which was sponsored by Representative Kika de la Garza of Texas on April 11, 1984. The resolution proclaimed the month of July 1984 as "National Ice Cream Month" and July 15, 1984 as "National Ice Cream Day". It was signed into public law by President Ronald Reagan on July 9, 1984, with Presidential Proclamation 5219.

Even though the resolution only mentioned a specific month and day in 1984, the celebrations have held up in the years ever since, publicized by ice cream manufacturers.

== See also ==
- List of food days
