= Madeira's Autonomy Day =

Autonomy Day
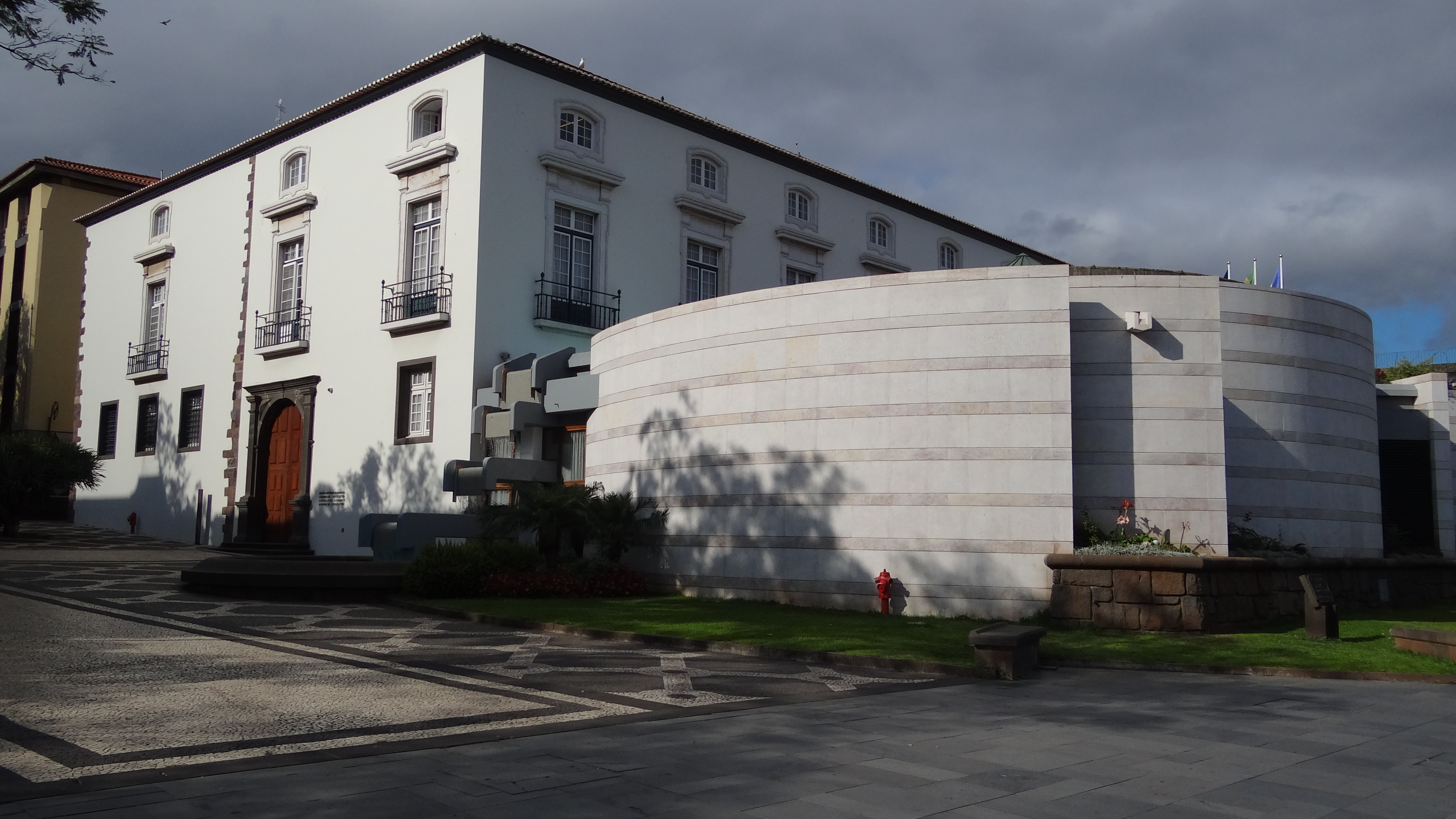
- Legislative Assembly of the Autonomous Region of Madeira
- Official name: Autonomy Day
- Observed by: Madeira
- Type: Regional
- Significance: To mark the date of the approval of the 1976 Constitution, which recognized the political and administrative autonomy of the archipelagos of Madeira and the Azores.
- Date: 2 April
- Frequency: Annual
- First time: 2025; 0 years ago
- Started by: Suggested by Commission for the Celebrations of the 50th Anniversary of Autonomy and approved unanimously by the Legislative Assembly of the Autonomous Region of Madeira.
- Related to: Madeira Day

Madeira's Autonomy Day, (Portuguese: Dia da Autonomia), celebrated in Madeira on 2 April, is a holiday marking the date of the approval of the 1976 Constitution, which recognized the political and administrative autonomy of the archipelagos of Madeira and the Azores. It is a public holiday in the Autonomous Region of Madeira.

== History ==
On November 27, 2024, the Legislative Assembly of Madeira unanimously approved the establishment of April 2 as the regional public holiday known as the Autonomy Day. This date commemorates the approval of the Portuguese Constitution on April 2, 1976, which granted political and administrative autonomy to the archipelagos of Madeira and the Azores, marking a significant milestone in Portugal's democratic evolution following the Carnation Revolution of April 25, 1974.

The proposal for this holiday was initiated by the Commission for the Celebrations of the 50th Anniversary of Autonomy, led by former Regional Government's vice-president João Cunha e Silva, and received cross-party support within the regional parliament. The Autonomy Day is intended to highlight the historical achievement of self-governance and the subsequent political, economic, social, and cultural advancements in Madeira and Porto Santo. This new holiday is distinct from the Madeira Day, celebrated on July 1, which commemorates the discovery of the Madeira archipelago.^{[1]}

The legislation establishing the Autonomy Day was sent to publication, by the Representative of the Republic, in the Madeiran and Portuguese official gazettes and became law on December 16, allowing for its first observance on April 2, 2025.

=== Criticism ===
Nuno Morna, the sole representative of the Iniciativa Liberal in Madeira's Legislative Assembly, expressed significant reservations about the chosen date for Madeira's Autonomy Day. The date, April 2, marks the approval of the 1976 Portuguese Constitution, which granted autonomy to the Madeira and Azores archipelagos. Morna highlighted his discomfort with this choice due to the Constitution's preamble, which he noted references April 25, 1974, as paving the way for a socialist society.

Morna argued that April 4 would be a more fitting date for the holiday. On this day in 1931, the Madeira Revolt took place—a moment when the people of Madeira took to the streets and, for a month, made independent decisions for the island. He described this event as "a moment of resistance and struggle for autonomy," emphasizing its historical significance as a demonstration of the Madeiran people's determination for self-governance. Despite his advocacy for April 4, he voted in favour of April 2 date.

Another critic of the April 2 date was the economist Miguel Pinto-Correia. Pinto-Correia publicly proposed to establish April 2 as the "Day of Autonomy, the Autonomous Region of Madeira, and Madeiran Communities," replacing the existing July 1 holiday (Madeira Day), which more associated with the Autonomous Region itself than the arrival of the Portuguese to the archipelago. Additionally, he suggested the creation of a second regional holiday on September 12, designated as the "Day of the Region's Flag." These proposed changes aimed to align Madeira's holidays with significant historical and symbolic events, reflecting both the island's journey toward autonomy and its regional identity. While April 2 would commemorate the approval of the 1976 Portuguese Constitution that granted political and administrative autonomy to Madeira, September 12 would celebrate the importance of the Madeiran flag as a symbol of regional pride and unity.

==== Legality ====
Two Madeiran lawyers, João Lizardo and Américo Silva Dias, associated to the Portuguese Communist Party and the far-right Chega, respectively, have issued a statement on December 19, 2024, criticising the approval of a regional holiday for 2 April by the Regional Legislative Assembly. They point out that the diploma has legal problems, especially as it doesn't consult the social partners, a requirement in the case of labour legislation. They argue that the creation of the holiday flouts national laws, including the Labour Code, and that the position of the Representative of the Republic is based on previous interpretations by the Constitutional Court, which may not be repeated.

The lawyers point out that similar situations have been challenged by the courts in the past, as happened with the 15/09/2000 "public holiday", and predict that the same will happen now. They also criticise the lack of attention to the legislative limits of regional autonomy, warning that alternative solutions could have avoided what they allege to be a problem.
