= Beatles Day =

Most fans of the Beatles from the UK, celebrate this "Holiday"

"Beatles Day" was a short-lived fan-based event. It celebrated The Beatles' return to Liverpool on 10 July 1964 from their US tour, in time for the premiere of their film A Hard Day's Night. This day was mistakenly claimed by a tiny group of people to be allegedly 'one of the landmarks in their rise to fame', celebrated by a handful of people in Liverpool and Hamburg.
