= Federation Day =

Educational practice in Wales

Federation Day is a day in the Welsh school week when all the primary and secondary children come together in one unit. It is a solution for rural small schools in Wales.
