= Public holidays in Rwanda =

This is a list of public holidays in Rwanda. Rwanda observes fourteen regular public holidays, which reflects the civic, historical and religious landscape.

Additionally, the week following Genocide Memorial Day on 7 April is designated an official week of mourning. The last Saturday of each month is umuganda, a national day of community service, during which most normal services remain closed until midday.

== Public holidays ==
Date	English name	Comments
1-2 January	New Year's Day	
1 February	National Heroes' Day	An annual event to pay tribute to people who exemplified and defended the highest values of patriotism and sacrifice for the wellbeing of the country and its citizens.
Friday before Easter	Good Friday	
Monday after Easter	Easter Monday	
7 April	Tutsi Genocide Memorial Day	Tutsi Genocide Memorial Day public holiday memorializes victims of the 1994 Genocide against the Tutsi.
1 May	Labour Day	Labour Day
1 July	Independence Day	Rwanda's National Day celebrates its independence from Belgium in July 1962.
4 July	Liberation Day	Marks the end of the 100 day Genocide against the Tutsi that took place in 1994.
First Friday in August	Umuganura Day	A Thanksgiving festival to mark the start of the harvest.
15 August	Assumption Day	
25 December	Christmas Day	
26 December	Boxing Day	
1 Shawwal	Eid al-Fitr	Festival of Breaking the Fast
10 Dhu al-Hijjah	Eid al-Adha	Feast of the Sacrifice
