= Day of Officials and Civil Servants =

Day of officials and civil servants (earlier Day of Officials) is held on every 1 July in Hungary. It was the date when the law XXXIII. of 1992 about officials became effective in the same year. Trade union of Hungarian Officials and State Employee proposed to hold a celebration in every year on this day. First celebration was held in 1997 as a Day of Officials. It is a holiday for officials since 2001. On 20 July 2011 Parliament of Hungary declared the day as a holiday for civil servants as well.
