= Public holidays in Kiribati =

The following are public holidays in Kiribati. Dates refer to 2002.

| Date | Name | Comments |
|---|---|---|
| 1 January | New Year's Day | |
| 8 March | International Women's Day | |
| moveable | Good Friday | |
| moveable | Easter Monday | |
| 7 April | Health Day | |
| 1 May | Labour Day | |
| 20 June | Police Day | |
| 10 July | Gospel Day | |
| 11 July | National Culture and Senior Citizens Day | |
| 12 July | National Day | Kiribati gained independence from the United Kingdom on July 12, 1979. This is the main holiday of a three-day holiday break flanked by Gospel Day and National Culture and Senior Citizens Day. The specific dates of these holidays depend on what day of the week July 12 falls. |
| 13 July | Special Day | |
| First Friday in August | National Youth Day | |
| 5 October | World Teachers' Day | |
| 10 December | Human Rights and Peace Day | |
| 25 December | Christmas Day | |
| 26 December | Boxing Day | |
