= Memorial Day (Newfoundland and Labrador) =

Holiday in Newfoundland and Labrador

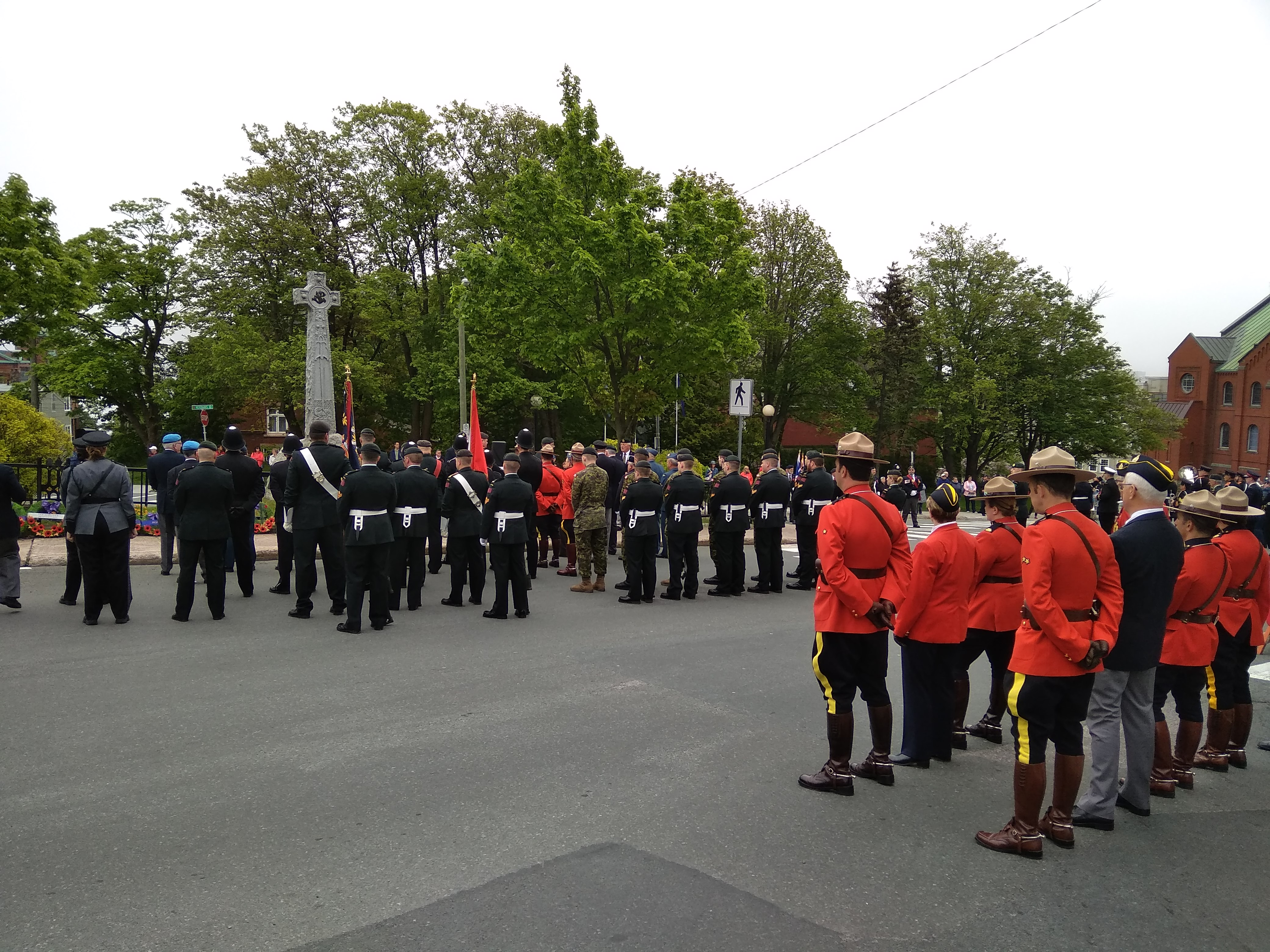
- Memorial Day Parade in St. John's
- Official name: Memorial Day
- Observed by: Dominion of Newfoundland (formerly); Newfoundland and Labrador (currently)
- Significance: Commemorates Newfoundland and Labrador war dead
- Observances: Parades, silences
- Date: 1 July
- Next time: 1 July 2027
- Frequency: annual

Memorial Day has been observed annually since 1 July 1917, to recall the losses of approximately 700 soldiers of the 1st Newfoundland Regiment from the Dominion of Newfoundland at Beaumont-Hamel on the first day on the Somme during the First World War. Since the induction of Newfoundland into Canada in 1949, "Memorial Day" has been amalgamated to commemorate the war-time sacrifices of members of the armed forces of the Canadian province Newfoundland and Labrador. It is observed concurrently with Canada's national holiday, Canada Day.

== History ==
During the First World War Newfoundland was a Dominion of the British Empire with a population of 240,000, and not yet part of Canada. The 1st Newfoundland Regiment was deployed at Suvla Bay on the Gallipoli peninsula with the 29th British Division in support of the Gallipoli Campaign. With the close of the Gallipoli Campaign the regiment spent a short period recuperating before being transferred to the Western Front in March 1916. In France, the regiment regained battalion strength in preparation for the Battle of the Somme. The infantry assault began on 1 July 1916, and at 8:45 a.m. the Newfoundland Regiment and 1st Battalion of the Essex Regiment received orders to move forward. So far as can be ascertained, 22 officers and 758 other ranks were directly involved in the advance. Of these, all the officers and slightly under 658 other ranks became casualties. Of the 780 men who went forward only about 110 survived unscathed, of whom only 68 were available for roll call the following day. For all intents and purposes the Newfoundland Regiment had been wiped out, the unit as a whole having suffered a casualty rate of approximately 90%.

In the past, the forget-me-not was used to commemorate those who had sacrificed during war. The small flowers were pinned in the same way that the poppy is used on Remembrance Day, November 11. The province of Newfoundland and Labrador often observes Memorial Day during the morning at the National War Memorial in St. John's and cenotaphs around the province, flying the Union Flag at half staff. In the afternoon and evening they celebrate Canada Day. Besides Remembrance Day, this day is the only other day in which the red poppy is worn in Canada.

In 2024, an unknown Newfoundland soldier killed at Beaumont-Hamel was ceremonially entombed on Memorial Day for the centenary of the province's National War Memorial, in a ceremony attended by Governor General Mary Simon, Prime Minister Justin Trudeau, and Premier of Newfoundland and Labrador Andrew Furey.

== See also ==
- Beaumont-Hamel Newfoundland Memorial
- The Fighting Newfoundlander
