= Engineer's Day =

Engineers Day all over the world

Engineer's Day is observed in several countries on various dates of the year.

== Country-wise list ==
Country	Date	Notes
Argentina	June 16	On June 16, 1855, the first Civil Engineering degree in the country was offered and made available at the University of Buenos Aires.
Australia	Week of 4 to 10 August 2014	
Bangladesh	May 7	Institution of Engineers, Bangladesh was established on this day in 1948.
Bahrain	July 1	
Belgium	March 20	
Bolivia	October 16	
Brazil	11 December 1933	Day that the Law 23.659 regulated the Engineer, Architect and Surveyor professions.
Bulgaria	Week of 17 to 23 February 2014	
Canada	September 17	
Chile	May 14	
Colombia	May 29	Corresponds to the date Commemoration of the founding of "Sociedad Colombiana de Ingenieros" in 1887.
Costa Rica	July 20	Corresponds to the date of Panamerican engineer's day
Croatia	March 2	Engineer's Day is celebrated on 2 March as a tribute to the date in 1878 on which first association of engineers was established in Zagreb.
Dominican Republic	August 14, 2014	
Ecuador	June 29	
El Salvador	July 20	
Egypt	September, date variable	
France	March 4	As a tribute to the creation of the "Société Civile des Ingénieurs" in 1848 (now named IESF), and the creation of WFEO in 1968 (IESF is a founding member). Since 2020, March 4 has been registered as "World Engineering Day for a Sustainable World" by UNESCO with the support of IESF and WFEO.
Guatemala	January 30	
Greece	March 10	
Honduras	July 16	
Iceland	April 10	
India	September 15	It is celebrated since 1968 as tribute to the Indian engineer and Bharat Ratna Sir Mokshagundam Viswesvaraya (popularly known as Sir MV).
Iran	Week of 19 to 25 February (24 February every year)	This day is celebrated to respect Nasir al-Din al-Tusi, Iranian scientist.
Ireland	9 to 15 February 2014	
Israel	January 22	יום המהנדס/ת הישראלי/ת - Israel Engineer's Day
Italy	June 15	
Korea	March 30, 2014	
Luxembourg	February 8, 2014	
Malaysia	Movable. Engineer's Week in 2017 20–26 August	
Mauritius	September 13	
Mexico	July 1	
Nepal	Shrawan 3, (Vikram Samvat calendar)	Nepali students and groups affiliated with NOSK celebrate Engineer's Day on Software Freedom Day.
Netherlands	Third Wednesday of March (e.g. 19 March 2014)	
Pakistan	10 January 2014	When Pakistan Engineering Council came into being for the regulation of engineering profession and education in Pakistan. Only celebrated in 2014.
Paraguay	July 23	
Panama	January 26	
Peru	June 8	
Poland	August 14, 2014	
Portugal	November 23, 2014	
Puerto Rico	13 to 19 May 2014	Engineer's & Geometer's Week
Romania, South Africa	September 14	
Russia	December 22	Power Engineer's Day
Singapore	23 to 24 July 2016	Organised by the Institution of Engineers, Singapore (IES)
Slovakia	March 16, 2014	
Spain	March 19	
Sri Lanka	September 15	
Switzerland	March 4	Engineer's Day was launched on March 15, 2018, by Daniel Löhr (civil engineer FH / STV) and Christian Vils (electrical engineer FH / STV). The day of the engineers becomes a nationwide event every year in Switzerland. On this day, the company should pay tribute to the achievements of the engineers, who enable us to lead a carefree life.
Taiwan	June 6	
Tanzania	15 September	
Tunisia	October 26, 2013	
Turkey	September 19	
Ukraine	July 31	День інженера. Професія інженера в Україні стає дедалі популярнішою. Цей день обрано з метою висловлення подяки інженерам за їхню працю.
United Kingdom	First week of November annually	In mid-2018, it was announced that a new national day to celebrate engineering would be launched in the United Kingdom in January 2018. It would be known as This Is Engineering Day. The concept was developed by The Royal Academy of Engineering. The first year's campaign was to raise the profile of a career in engineering, with only 30,000 students each year studying both maths and physics A-levels, which are prerequisites for to study engineering at many universities. The hashtag #ThisIsEngineering often trended on social media each year after the launch with the campaign's focus to try and change some of the perceptions often associated with engineering. The annual celebration of engineering day was rebranded in 2022 to National Engineering Day. In the same year, a study from the Royal Academy of Engineering stated that engineering adds an estimated £645 billion to the UK's annual economy.
United States of America	Week of February 22	Always the week in February that encompasses George Washington's birthday
Uruguay	October 12	
Venezuela	October 28	In commemoration of the installment of the Engineers College on October 28, 1861

== See also ==
- UNESCO World Engineering Day for Sustainable Development
