= Territory Day =

Holiday in the Northern Territory of Australia

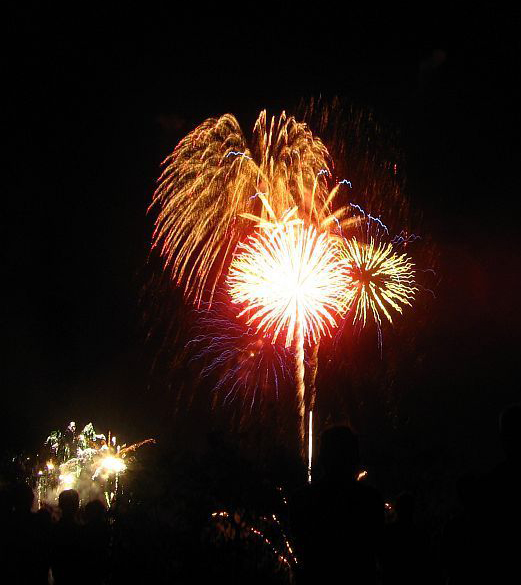
- Fireworks going off to celebrate Territory Day 2008 in The Gardens, Northern Territory
- Also called: "Cracker Night" (for night celebrations)
- Observed by: Residents of the Northern Territory
- Type: Patriotic
- Celebrations: Widespread use of fireworks without permit requirements
- Date: 1 July
- Frequency: Annual
- First time: 1978; 48 years ago

Territory Day is a holiday widely celebrated in the Northern Territory of Australia on 1 July that commemorates the territory achieving self-government in 1978. The holiday has been famously commemorated with fireworks since the early 1980s. Popularly known as Cracker Night, Territorians are provided five hours to legally blow up fireworks without needing a permit or special training, the only instance of its kind in Australia.

== Background ==
After decades of efforts to achieve self-government, Prime Minister Gough Whitlam pledged in 1974 to grant the territory self-rule, which went into effect on 1 July 1978. The implementation of self-government was considered significant as it allowed for Territorians to purchase freehold land. This proved a boon to commercial development in the territory, allowing for the construction of hotels, casinos, and other tourist attractions.

== History of the holiday ==
On 1 July 1978, over 6,000 Territorians gathered at the Darwin Cenotaph in celebration of self-governance status and the inaugural Northern Territory flag-raising: This would later be acknowledged as the first Territory Day.

Beginning in the early 1980s, the use of fireworks became a staple of the holiday. Paul Everingham, then-serving as the first Chief Minister of the Northern Territory, said that "controlled pyrotechnic displays will be encouraged" on the holiday. Under Northern Territory law, on 1 July, individuals aged 18 years and older are allowed to legally purchase fireworks without a permit between 9 AM and 9 PM, and are only permitted to set them off between 6 PM and 11 PM.

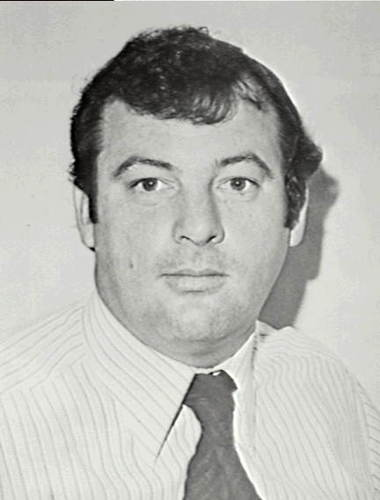
Paul Everingham, the first Chief Minister of the Northern Territory, was reportedly an early supporter of the firework celebrations

On Territory Day 2015, an estimated 25,000 Territorians gathered in Darwin for a "much-hyped pyrotechnics display. Due to the COVID-19 pandemic in Australia, Territory Day celebrations were called off in 2020. In 2021, then-tourism minister Natasha Fyles announced that the holiday would resume in 2021, with alternative rock band Eskimo Joe joining the lineup at the celebration in Darwin.

== Public holiday proposals ==
The possibility of making Territory Day a formal public holiday in Australia has been considered by the territorial government at various times. In 2015, then-Chief Minister Adam Giles floated the possibility of making Territory Day a public holiday by "swapping it with an existing one". According to Giles, he abandoned the proposal when "Territorians were divided" about replacing another public holiday with Territory Day.

== Controversies ==
=== Fire risks ===
Due to the widespread use of fireworks on Territory Day, territorial and local leaders have urged caution in order to avoid dangerous accidents. On Territory Day 2019, seventeen Territorians were sent to the hospital due to "minor burns, lacerations and ear related injuries". Commentators have noted that the event poses special risks in rural communities near Darwin, as July is "associated with acute fire risk" in the region.

=== Impact on other states ===
The smuggling of fireworks purchased legally on Territory Day to Western Australia has reportedly become a "top priority [for police] in Western Australia", where possession of fireworks without a permit is strictly forbidden. In 2019, illegal fireworks purchased in the Northern Territory was believed to have sparked a bushfire in the Western Australian town of Broome.
