= Madeira Day =

Holiday in Madeira, Portugal

Dia da Madeira
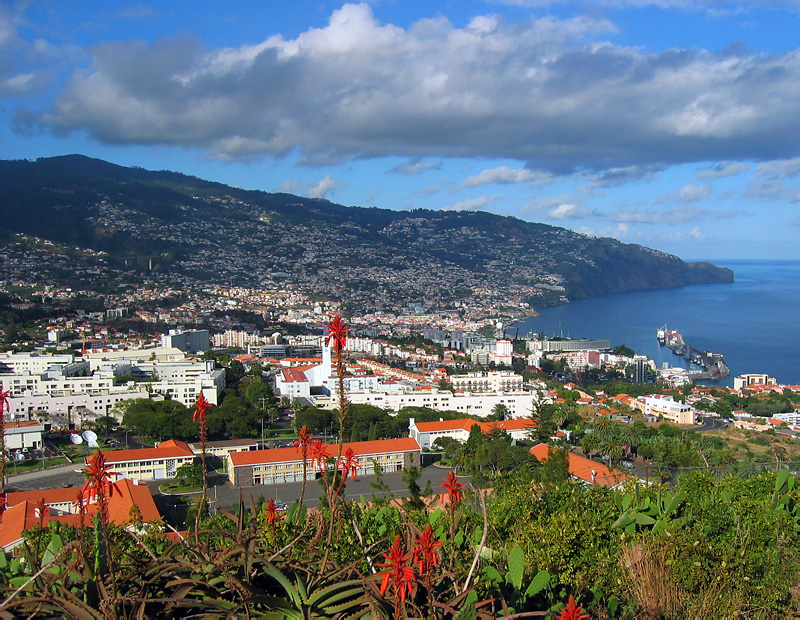
- Funchal harbour.
- Official name: Dia da Região Autónoma da Madeira e das Comunidades Madeirenses
- Observed by: Madeira
- Type: Regional holiday
- Date: July 1
- Next time: 1 July 2026
- Frequency: annual
- First time: 1980; 45 years ago
- Related to: Madeira's Autonomy Day

Madeira Day, officially known as Autonomous of Region of Madeira and Madeiran Communities' Day (Portuguese: Dia da Região Autónoma da Madeira e das Comunidades Madeirenses), celebrated in Madeira on 1 July, is a holiday marking the date when Portuguese explorers arrived in Machico's bay in 1419. It is a public holiday in the Autonomous Region.

It is also celebrated by Madeiran expats and descendants.

== History ==
=== Date of the Portuguese discovery of Madeira Island ===
According to tradition and some of the earliest historical accounts, Portuguese navigators, having already known about the island of Porto Santo since November 1, 1418, are said to have sighted the island of Madeira for the first time on July 1, 1419, celebrating a mass on land the following day.

=== Establishment of the holiday ===
Exactly two years after the fall of the Salazar regime on April 25, 1974, the current Portuguese Constitution came into effect, recognizing for the first time political autonomy for the archipelagos of Madeira and the Azores. Several symbols were gradually adopted by the regional political bodies to represent and celebrate this autonomy: besides the regional holiday, the flag, the coat of arms, the anthem, and new toponymy and statuary.

The regional holiday was created in 1979 by the Regional Assembly, which justified the choice of July 1, date of the discovery of Madeira in 1419, instead of November 1, date of the discovery of Porto Santo in 1418, with the fact that the latter date was already a national holiday, All Saints' Day. In 1989, the Assembly would adopt the current designation of the holiday (Day of the Autonomous Region of Madeira and the Madeiran Communities), now also evoking the emigrant diaspora of the archipelago, after a unanimous suggestion of the II Congress of the Madeiran Communities.
