= December =

Twelfth month in the Julian and Gregorian calendars

<<	December					>>
Su	Mo	Tu	We	Th	Fr	Sa
		1	2	3	4	5
6	7	8	9	10	11	12
13	14	15	16	17	18	19
20	21	22	23	24	25	26
27	28	29	30	31
2026

December is the twelfth and final month of the year in the Julian and Gregorian calendars. Its length is 31 days.

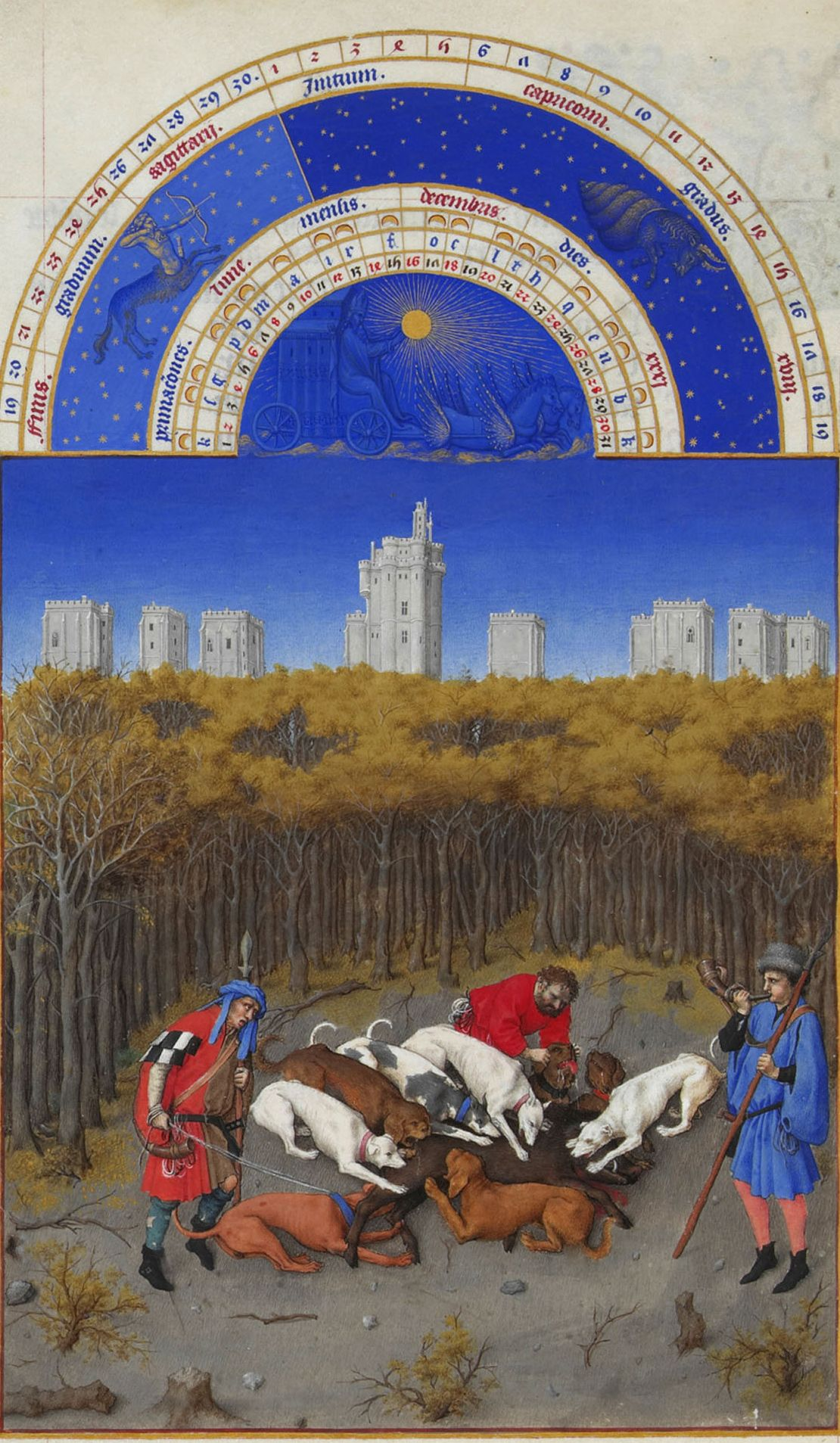
December, from the Très Riches Heures du duc de Berry

In recent decades, the number of warm temperature records in December has outpaced cold temperature records over a growing portion of Earth's surface.

Chart shows changes in global average temperature annually in December of each year

December's name derives from the Latin word decem (meaning 10) because it was originally the tenth month of the year in the calendar of Romulus c. 750 BC, which began in March. The winter days following December were not included as part of any month. Later, the months of January and February were created out of the monthless period and added to the beginning of the calendar, but December retained its name.

December is the first month of winter in the Northern Hemisphere and the first month of summer in the Southern Hemisphere.

In Ancient Rome, as one of the four Agonalia, this day in honor of Sol Indiges was held on December 11, as was Septimontium. Dies natalis (birthday) was held at the temple of Tellus on December 13, Consualia was held on December 15, Saturnalia was held December 17–23, Opiconsivia was held on December 19, Divalia was held on December 21, Larentalia was held on December 23, and the dies natalis of Sol Invictus was held on December 25. These dates do not correspond to the modern Gregorian calendar.

The Anglo-Saxons referred to December–January as Ġēolamonaþ (modern English: "Yule month"). The French Republican Calendar contained December within the months of Frimaire and Nivôse.

== Astronomy ==
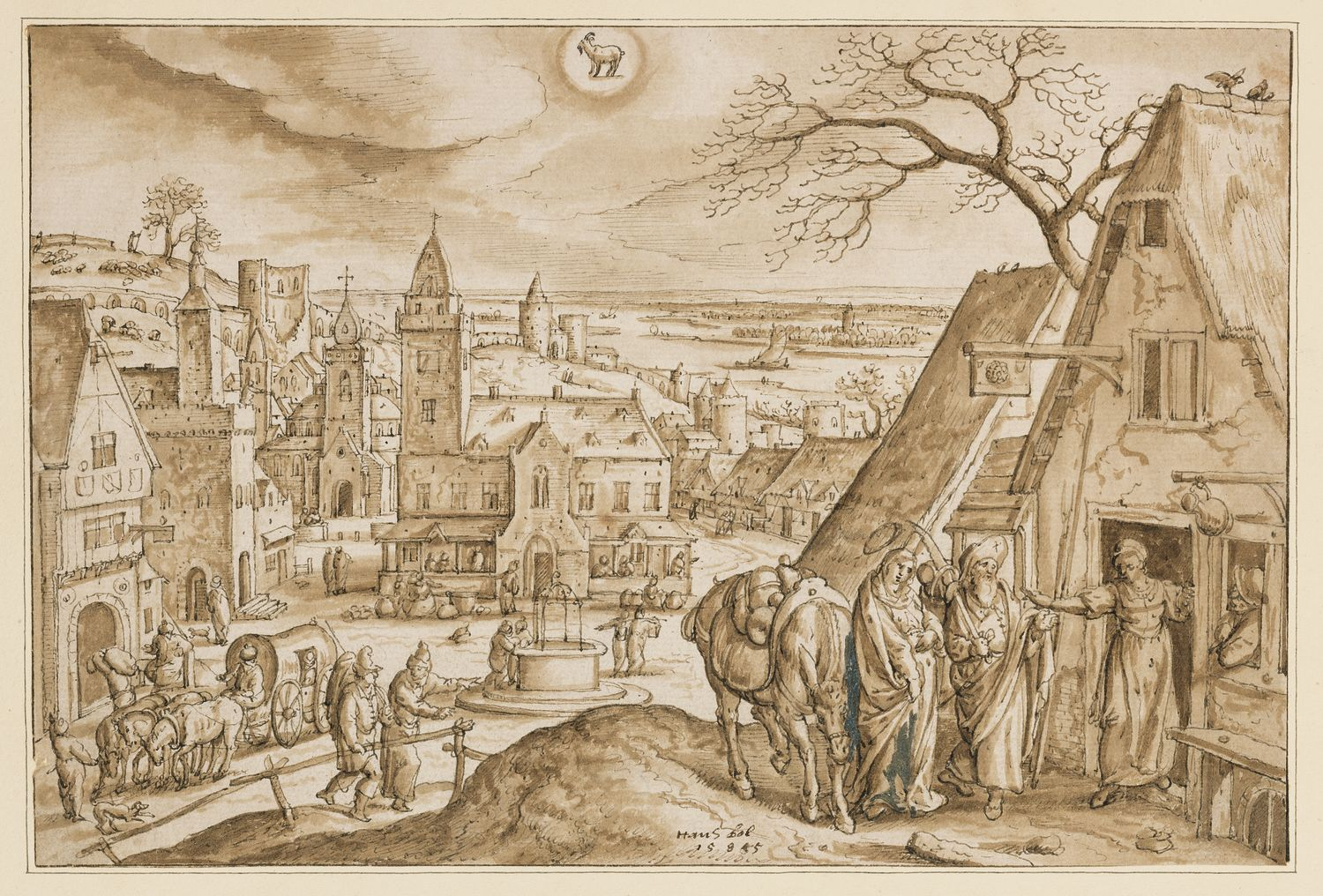
The month of December depicted in Hans Bol's and Adriaen Collart's Emblematica Evangelica

December contains the winter solstice in the Northern Hemisphere, the day with the fewest daylight hours, and the summer solstice in the Southern Hemisphere, the day with the most daylight hours (excluding polar regions in both cases, which consistently have none or 24 hours, respectively, near the solstice). December in the Northern Hemisphere is the seasonal equivalent to June in the Southern Hemisphere and vice versa. In the Northern hemisphere, the beginning of the astronomical winter is traditionally 21 December or the date of the solstice.

Meteor showers occurring in December are the Andromedids (September 24 – December 6, peaking around November 9), the Canis-Minorids (December 4 – December 15, peaking around December 10–11), the Coma Berenicids (December 12 to December 23, peaking around December 16), the Delta Cancrids (December 14 to February 14, the main shower from January 1 to January 24, peaking on January 17), the Geminids (December 13–14), the Monocerotids (December 7 to December 20, peaking on December 9. This shower can also start in November), the Phoenicids (November 29 to December 9, with a peak occurring around 5/6 December), the Quadrantids (typically a January shower but can also start in December), the Sigma Hydrids (December 4–15), and the Ursids (December 17-to December 25/26, peaking around December 22).

== Astrology ==
The zodiac signs for the month of December are Sagittarius (until December 21) and Capricorn (December 22 onward).

== Symbols ==
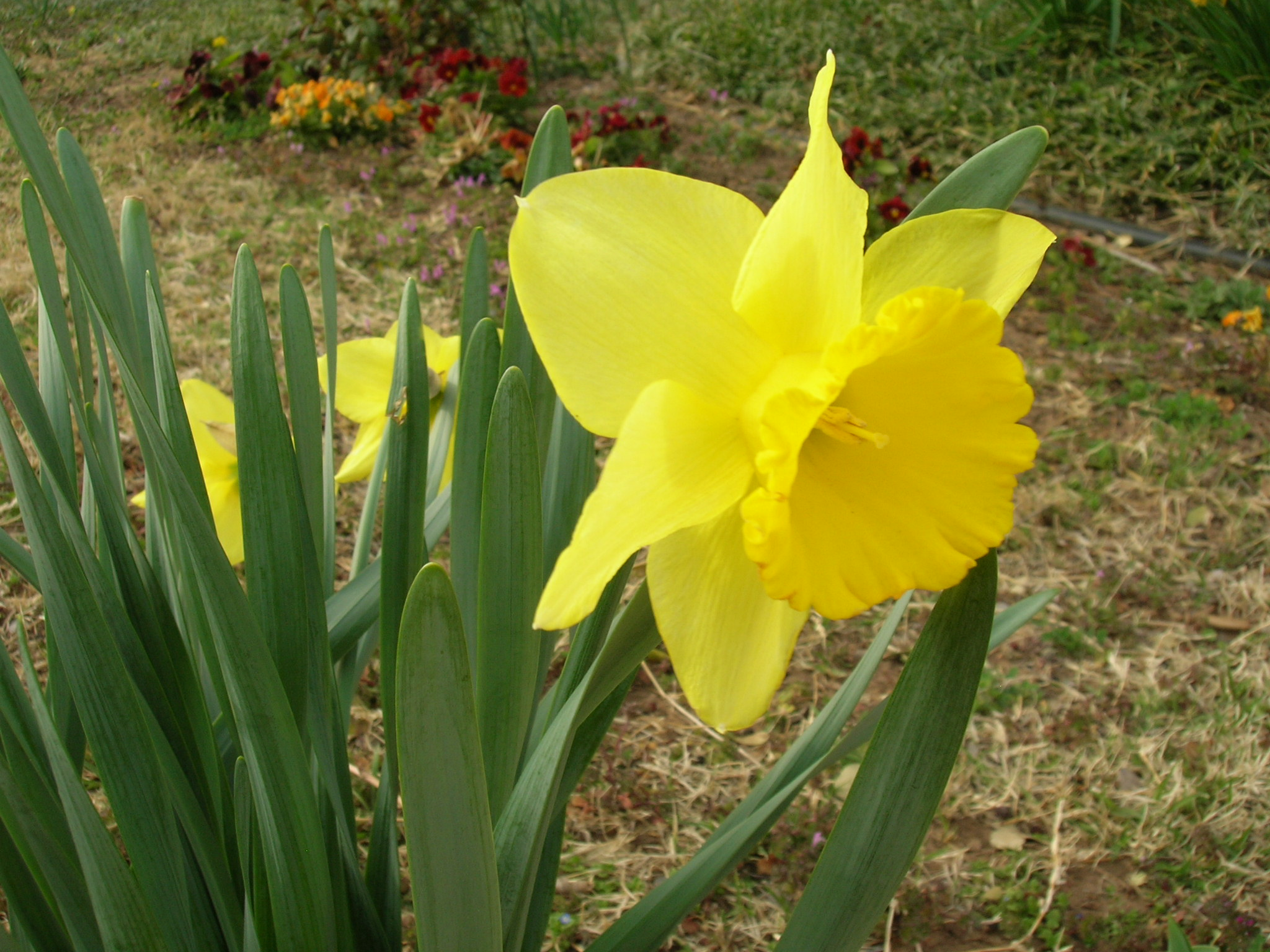
Yellow narcissus flower

December's birth flower is the narcissus. Its birthstones are turquoise, zircon and tanzanite.

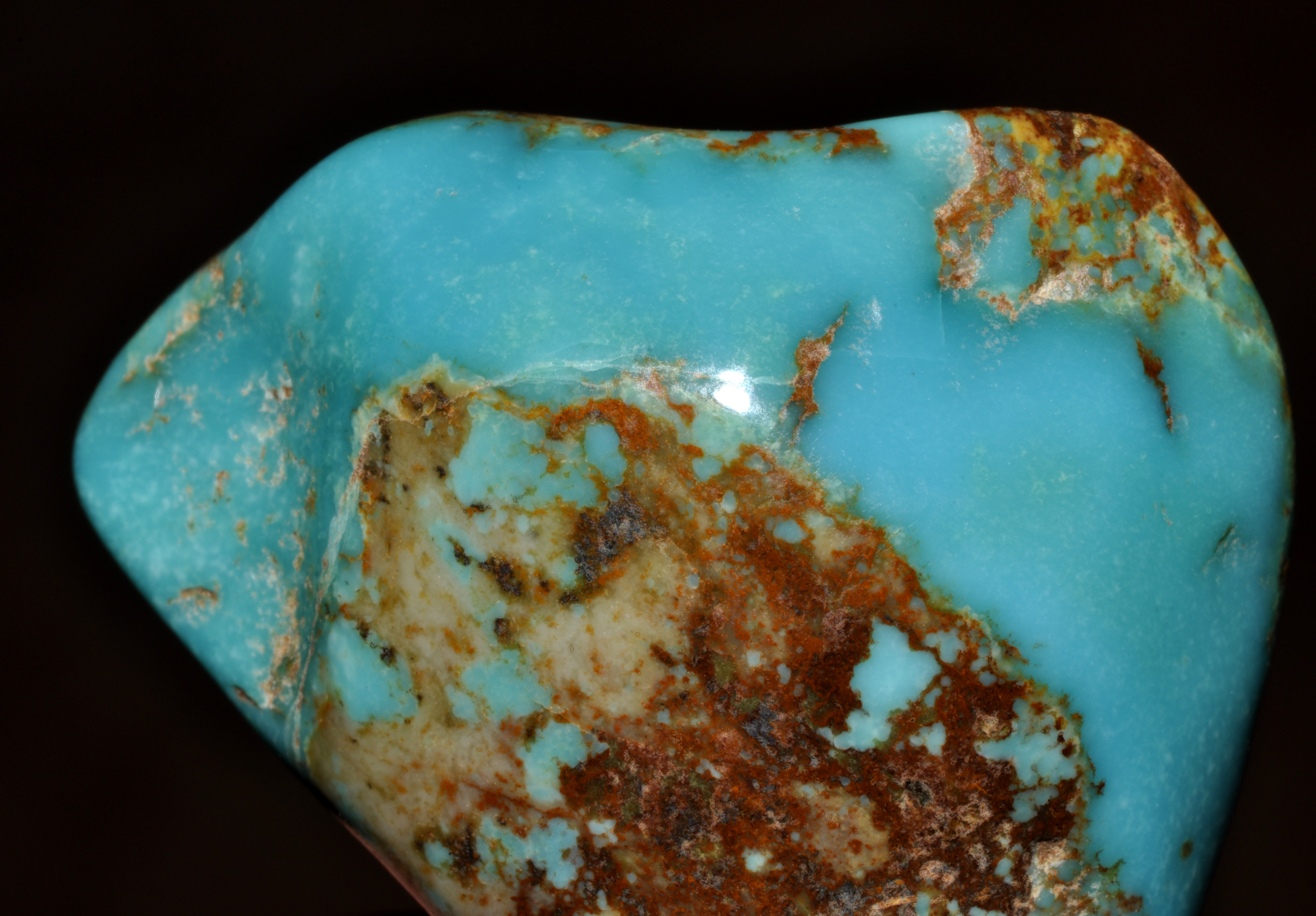
A slab of turquoise

Zircons

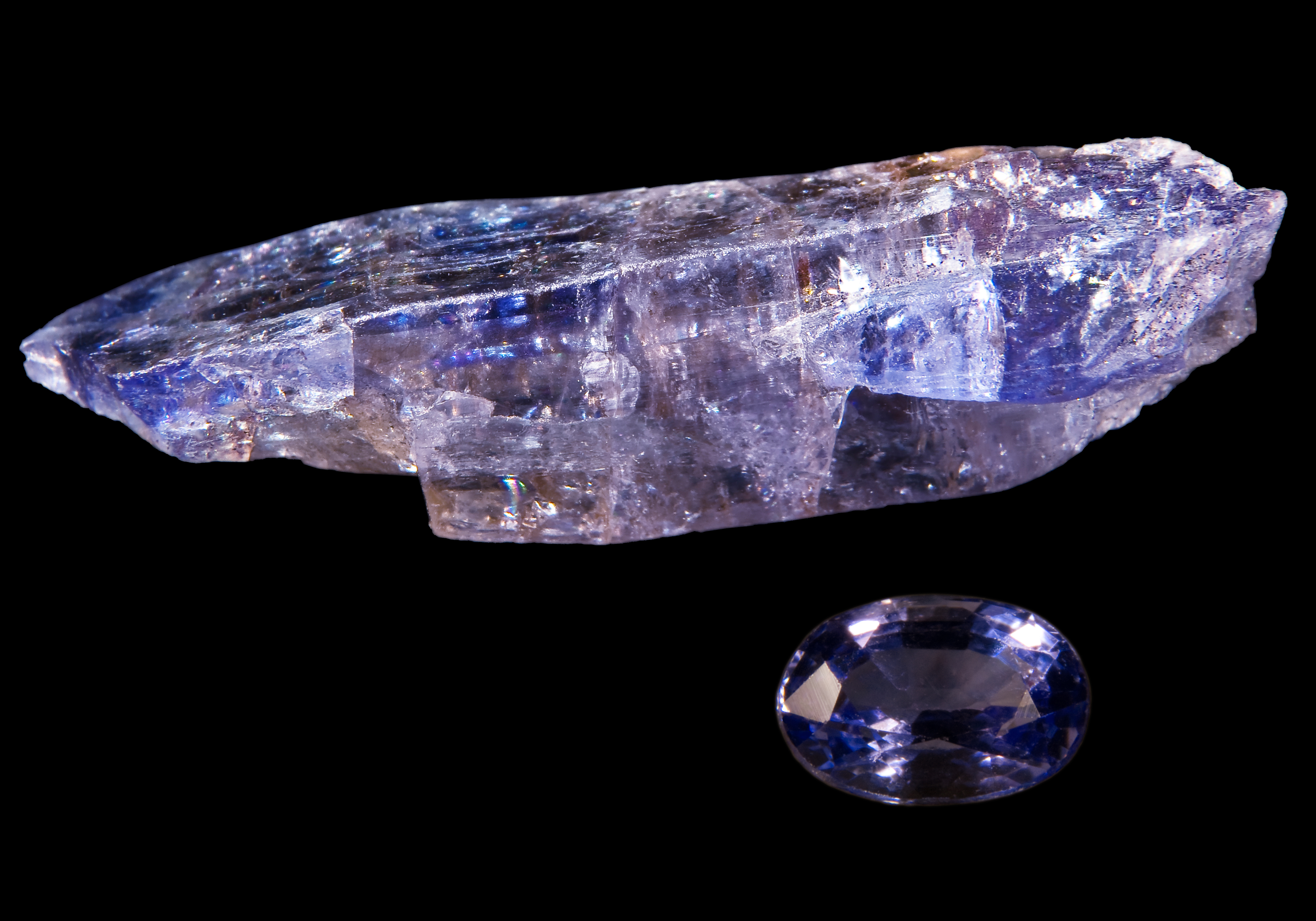
Rough and polished tanzanite

== Observances ==
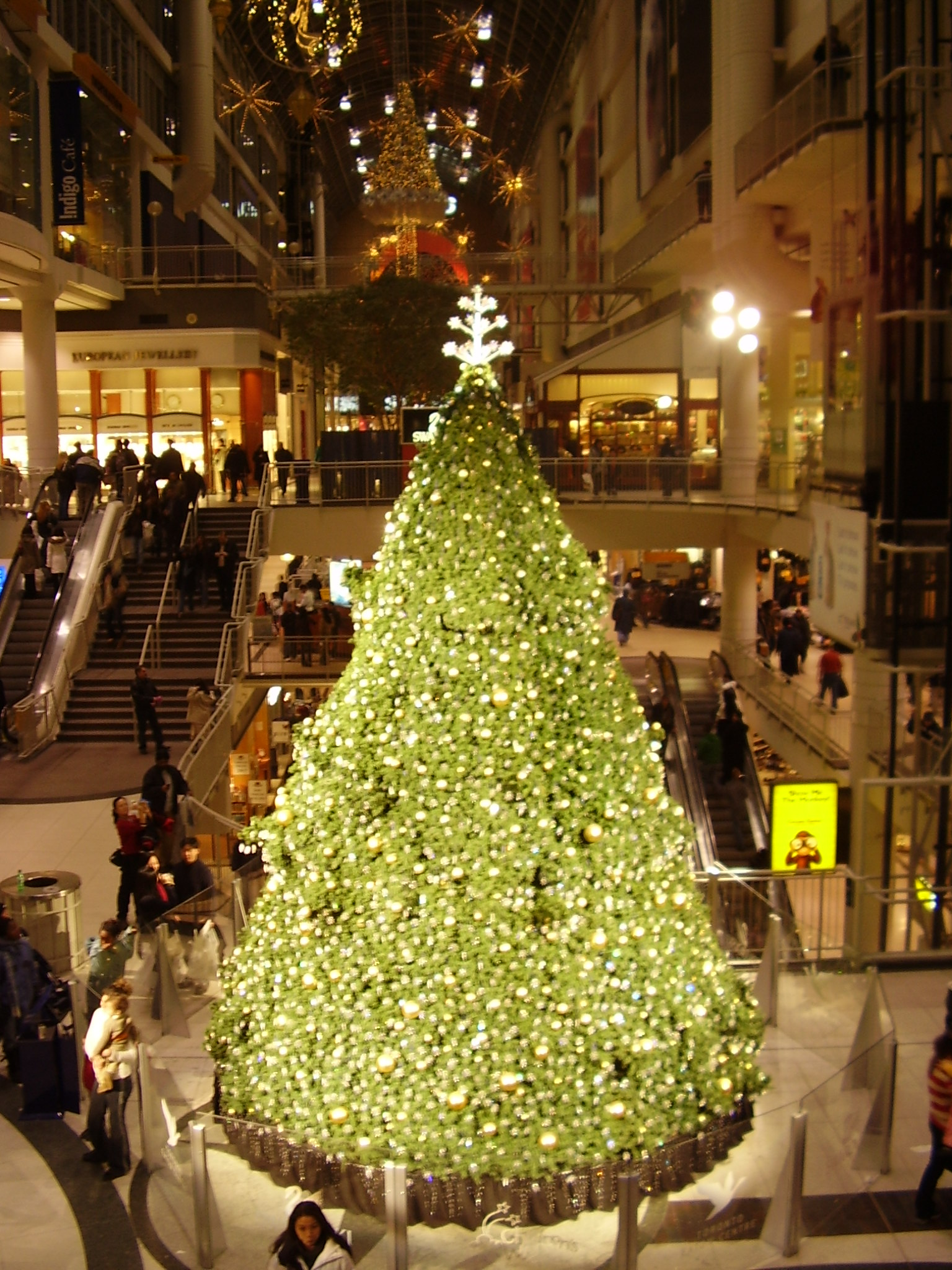
A Christmas tree at the Eaton Centre in Toronto

This list does not necessarily imply either official status or general observance.

=== Non-Gregorian ===
(All Baháʼí, Islamic, and Jewish observances begin at the sundown prior to the date listed, and end at sundown of the date in question unless otherwise noted.)

- List of observances set by the Baháʼí calendar
- List of observances set by the Chinese calendar
- List of observances set by the Hebrew calendar
- List of observances set by the Islamic calendar
- List of observances set by the Solar Hijri calendar

=== Month-long ===
- In Catholic tradition, December typically marks the beginning of the Season of Advent. It is also devoted to the Immaculate Conception.
- National Egg Nog Month (United States)
- National Impaired Driving Prevention Month (United States)
- National Fruit Cake Month (United States)
- National Pear Month (United States)

=== Movable ===
- See also Movable Western Christian observances
- See also Movable Eastern Christian observances

Tuesday immediately following fourth Thursday of November

- Giving Tuesday (United States) (can fall in December)

First Friday

- Farmer's Day (Ghana)
- Gospel Day (Marshall Islands)

First Sunday

- Good Neighborliness Day (Turkmenistan)
- Sindhi Cultural Day (Sindhi diaspora)

Second Monday

- Green Monday
- National Tree Planting Day (Malawi)

December 15, unless the date falls on a Sunday, then December 16

- Koninkrijksdag (Kingdom of the Netherlands)

Winter Solstice

- Blue Christmas (holiday)
- Brumalia (Ancient Rome)
- Dongzhi Festival (Asia)
- Global Orgasm
- Korochun (Slavic)
- Midsummer in the Southern Hemisphere. (Contemporary Paganism)
- Sanghamitta Day (Theravada Buddhism)
- Shalako (Zuni)
- Yaldā (Iran)
- Yule in the Northern Hemisphere (Contemporary Paganism)
- Ziemassvētki (Latvia)

December 22, unless that date is a Sunday, in which case the 23rd

- Forefathers' Day (Plymouth, Massachusetts)

December 26, unless that day is a Sunday, in which case the 27th

- Boxing Day (Commonwealth of Nations)
  - Day of Good Will (South Africa and Namibia)
  - Family Day (Vanuatu)
  - Thanksgiving (Solomon Islands)
  - Start of Boxing Week

=== Fixed ===
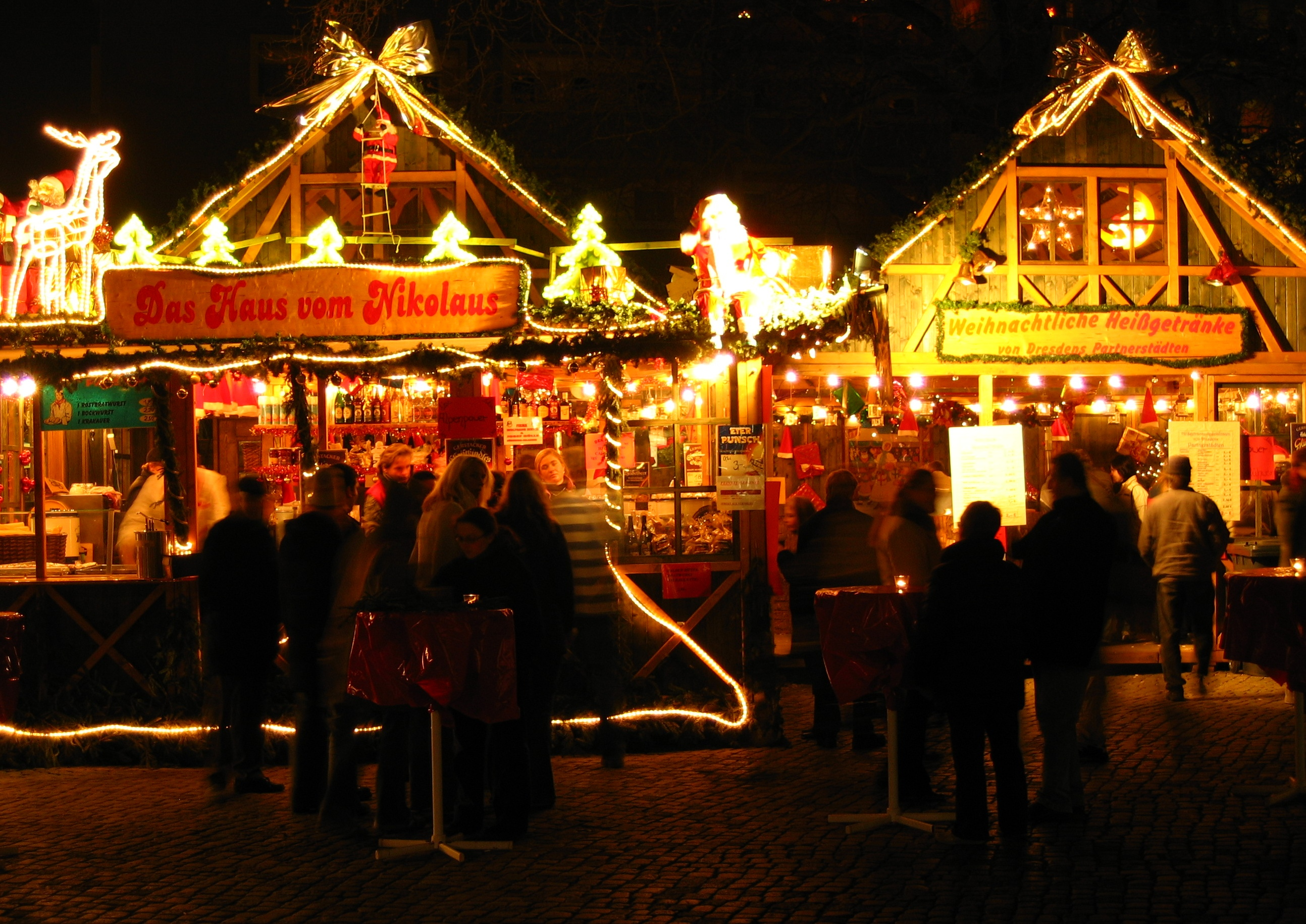
A Christmas market in Dresden

- November 25 – December 10: 16 Days of Activism against Gender-based Violence
- December 1
  - Battle of Sinop Day (Russia)
  - Damrong Rajanubhab Day (Thailand)
  - Day of Restoration of Independence (Portugal)
  - Eat A Red Apple Day (United States)
  - Feast for Death of Aleister Crowley (Thelema)
  - First President Day (Kazakhstan)
  - Freedom and Democracy Day (Chad)
  - Great Union Day (Romania)
  - Military Abolition Day (Costa Rica)
  - National Day (Myanmar)
  - Republic Day (Central African Republic)
  - Restoration of Independence Day (Portugal)
  - Rosa Parks Day (Ohio and Oregon, United States)
  - Self-governance Day (Iceland)
  - Teachers' Day (Panama)
  - World AIDS Day
    - Day Without Art
- December 2
  - Armed Forces Day (Cuba)
  - International Day for the Abolition of Slavery
  - National Day (Laos)
  - National Day (United Arab Emirates)
  - National Fritters Day (United States)
- December 3
  - Doctors' Day (Cuba)
  - United Nations' International Day of Persons with Disabilities
- December 4
  - National Cookie Day (United States)
  - Navy Day (India)
  - Saint Barbara's Day-related observances:
    - Barbórka (Poland)
    - Eid il-Burbara (Russia, Israel, Jordan, Lebanon, Palestine, Syria, Turkey)
  - Thai Environment Day (Thailand)
  - Tupou I Day (Tonga)
- December 5
  - Children's Day (Suriname)
  - Day of the Ninja (unofficial)
  - Day of Military Honour – Battle of Moscow (Russia)
  - Discovery Day (Haiti and Dominican Republic)
  - International Volunteer Day for Economic and Social Development
  - Klozum (Schiermonnikoog, Netherlands)
  - Saint Nicholas Eve (Belgium, Czech Republic, Slovakia, the Netherlands, Hungary, Romania, Germany, Poland and the UK)
    - Krampusnacht (Austria)
  - King's Birthday (Thailand)
  - Repeal Day (United States)
  - World Soil Day
- December 6
  - Anniversary of the Founding of Quito (Ecuador)
  - Armed Forces Day (Ukraine)
  - Constitution Day (Spain)
  - Day of the Ministry of Communications and Information Technologies of Azerbaijan
  - Independence Day of Finland
  - National Day of Remembrance and Action on Violence Against Women (Canada)
  - Saint Nicholas Day (Western Christianity)
- December 7
  - Saint Ambrose Day
  - Armed Forces Flag Day (India)
  - Eve of the Immaculate Conception (Western Christianity) and related observances:
    - Day of the Little Candles, begins after sunset (Colombia)
    - Quema del Diablo, begins after sunset. (Guatemala)
  - International Civil Aviation Day
  - National Heroes Day (East Timor)
  - National Pearl Harbor Remembrance Day (United States)
  - Spitak Remembrance Day (Armenia)
- December 8
  - Battle Day (Falkland Islands)
  - Bodhi Day (Japan)
  - CARICOM–Cuba Day (Caribbean Community (CARICOM) and Cuba)
  - Constitution Day (Romania)
  - Constitution Day (Uzbekistan)
  - Day of Finnish Music (Finland)
  - Feast of the Immaculate Conception (public holiday in several countries, a holy day of obligation in others), and its related observances:
    - Conception of the Blessed Virgin Mary (Anglican Communion), lesser commemoration
    - Christmas on Campus (University of Dayton)
    - Mother's Day (Panama)
    - Festa da Conceição da Praia, celebrating Yemanjá, Queen of the Ocean (Salvador, Bahia)
    - Festival of Lights (Lyon)
  - Pansexual/Panromantic Pride Day
  - Saint Clement of Ohrid Day (North Macedonia)
  - National Brownie Day (United States)
  - National Youth Day (Albania)
- December 9
  - Anna's Day (Sweden and Finland)
  - Feast of the Conception of the Most Holy Theotokos by St. Anne (Eastern Orthodox)
  - Independence Day (Tanzania)
  - International Anti-Corruption Day
  - National Heroes Day (Antigua and Barbuda)
  - National Pastry Day (United States)
  - Navy Day (Sri Lanka)
  - Remembrance for Egill Skallagrímsson (The Troth)
  - Yuri's Day in the Autumn (Russian Orthodox Church)
- December 10
  - Alfred Nobel Day (Sweden)
  - Constitution Day (Thailand)
  - Human Rights Day (International)
- December 11
  - Human Rights and Peace Day (Kiribati)
  - Indiana Day (Indiana, United States)
  - National Have a Bagel Day (United States)
  - National Noodle Ring Day (United States)
  - National Tango Day (Argentina)
  - Pampanga Day (Pampanga province, Philippines)
  - Republic Day (Burkina Faso)
- December 12
  - Constitution Day (Russia)
  - Croatian Air Force Day (Croatia)
  - Day of Neutrality (Turkmenistan)
  - Feast of the Apparition of Our Lady of Guadalupe (Mexico)
  - Feast of Masá'il Baháʼí calendar (only if Baháʼí Naw-Rúz falls on March 21, which it does for 2015)
  - Kanji Day (Japan)
  - Jamhuri Day (Kenya)
- December 13
  - Acadian Remembrance Day (Acadians)
  - National Day (Saint Lucia)
  - Republic Day (Malta)
  - Sailor's Day (Brazil)
  - Saint Lucy's Day (mainly Scandinavia, some regions of Italy)
- December 14
  - Alabama Day (Alabama)
  - Forty-seven Ronin Remembrance Day (Sengaku-ji, Tokyo)
  - Martyred Intellectuals Day (Bangladesh)
  - Monkey Day (International)
- December 15
  - Bill of Rights Day (United States)
    - 2nd Amendment Day (South Carolina)
  - Homecoming Day (Alderney)
  - International Tea Day
  - National Cupcake Day (United States)
  - Remembrance Day of Journalists Killed in the Line of Duty (Russia)
  - Zamenhof Day (International Esperanto Community)
- December 16
  - National Day (Kingdom of Bahrain)
  - Victory day of Bangladesh
  - Day of Reconciliation in South Africa
  - International Day of the Belt and Road
- December 17
  - Accession Day (Bahrain)
  - International Day to End Violence Against Sex Workers
  - National Day (Bhutan)
  - National Maple Syrup Day (United States)
  - Pan American Aviation Day (United States)
  - Wright Brothers Day (United States)
- December 18
  - International Migrants Day (United Nations)
  - National Muffin Day (Brazil)
- December 19
  - Goa Liberation Day (Goa, India)
  - National Heroes and Heroines Day (Anguilla)
- December 20
  - Abolition of Slavery Day, also known as Fête des Cafres (Réunion, French Guiana)
  - Bo Aung Kyaw Day (Myanmar)
  - International Human Solidarity Day (International)
  - Macau Special Administrative Region Establishment Day (Macau)
  - National Sangria Day (United States)
- December 21
  - Armed Forces Day (Philippines)
  - First day of winter (some cultures)
  - Forefathers' Day (Plymouth, Massachusetts, United States)
  - National Hamburger Day (United States)
  - São Tomé Day (São Tomé and Príncipe)
  - The first day of Pancha Ganapati, celebrated until December 25 (Saiva Siddhanta Church)
- December 22
  - Armed Forces Day (Vietnam)
  - Mother's Day (Indonesia)
  - National Date Nut Bread Day (United States)
  - National Mathematics Day (India)
  - Teachers' Day (Cuba)
  - Unity Day (Zimbabwe)
- December 23
  - The Emperor's Birthday (Japan, Heisei era)
  - Festivus
  - HumanLight (Humanism)
- December 24
  - Christmas Eve
    - Aðfangadagskvöld, the day when the 13th and the last Yule Lad arrives to towns. (Iceland)
    - Feast of the Seven Fishes (Italy)
    - Juleaften (Denmark)/Julaften (Norway)/Julafton (Sweden)
    - Nittel Nacht (certain Orthodox Jewish denominations)
    - Nochebuena (Spain and Spanish-speaking countries)
    - The Declaration of Christmas Peace (Old Great Square of Turku, Finland's official Christmas City)
    - Quviasukvik (Inuit, Yupik, Aleut, Chukchi, Iñupiat and NunatuKavummiut people of Nunavut, the Northwest Territories, Yukon, Nunavik, Nunatsiavut, NunatuKavut, Alaska, Greenland and Chukotka), a new year celebration held until January 7th.
  - Day of Military Honour – Siege of Ismail (Russia)
  - Independence Day (Libya)
  - Mōdraniht (Anglo-Saxon paganism)
  - National Eggnog Day (United States)
- December 25
  - Children's Day (Cameroon, Central African Republic, Chad, Equatorial Guinea, Democratic Republic of the Congo, Gabon, Republic of Congo)
  - Christmas (Christianity)
    - Constitution Day (Taiwan)
    - Good Governance Day (India)
    - Newtonmas (Atheist community)
    - Quaid-e-Azam's Day (Pakistan)
    - Takanakuy (Chumbivilcas Province, Peru)
  - National Pumpkin Pie Day (United States)
- December 26
  - Independence Day in Slovenia – Independence and Unity Day
  - Kwanzaa (December 26 to January 1) (African-American community, United States)
  - Saint Stephen's Day
  - Wren Day (Ireland and the Isle of Man)
- December 27
  - Independence and Unity Day (Slovenia)
  - Mauro Hamza Day (Houston, Texas)
  - Mummer's Day (Padstow, Cornwall)
  - Saint Stephen's Day (public holiday in Alsace, Austria, Catalonia, Croatia, Czech Republic, Germany, Hong Kong, Italy, Ireland, Luxembourg, Poland, Slovakia and Switzerland)
    - Father's Day (Bulgaria)
  - The first day of Junkanoo street parade, the second day is on the New Year's Day (The Bahamas)
  - National Fruitcake Day (United States)
  - Zartosht No-Diso (Zoroastrianism)
- December 28
  - Proclamation Day in South Australia
- December 29
- December 30
  - Day of the Declaration of Slovakia as an Independent Ecclesiastic Province (Slovakia)
  - National Bicarbonate of Soda Day (United States)
  - Rizal Day (Philippines)
- December 31
  - International Solidarity Day (Azerbaijan)
  - National Champagne Day (United States)
  - New Year's Eve
    - Novy God Eve
    - Bisperás ng Bagong Taón (Philippines)
  - Ōmisoka (Japan)
  - Start of Hogmanay (Scotland) December 31 – January 1, in some cases until January 2.

== See also ==
- Historical anniversaries
- Undecimber
