= December 14 =

December 14 this year in various calendars
- Monday, 14 December 2026
Other calendars
Armenian	27 Kʿaloch 1476
Aztec	Tozoztontli 13, 1 Miquiztli
Babylonian	4 Kislimu, 2337 SE
Balinese pawukon	Menga, Beteng, Menala, Keliwon, Aryang, Coma of Wariga, Yama, Ogan, Suka
Bengali	29 Ogrohayon, BS 1433
Chinese	Yang Water Dog・Heart Mansion; 6 Shíyīyuè, Bǐngwǔnián (Daxue, 8 days until Dongzhi)
Common Era	14 December 2026 CE
Coptic	5 Koiak, AM 1743
Egyptian	2 Pachon, 2775 NE
Ethiopian	5 Tākḫśāś, 2019 Amätä Məhrät
French Republican	Décade III, Tridi de Frimaire de l'Année 235 de la République
Gregorian	14 December, AD 2026
Hebrew	4 Tevet, AM 5787
Hindu	5127 KY・1,872,923・Rāudra; Solar: 28 Mārgaśīrṣa, 1948 SE; Lunisolar: Pañcamī, Śukla pakṣa of Mārgaśīrṣa, 2083 VE
Icelandic	Mánudagur, 22 Ýlir 2026
Islamic	4 Rajab, AH 1448 (using tabular method)
ISO week date	2026-W51-1
Japanese	6 Shimotsuki, Reiwa 8 (Taisetsu, 8 days until Tōji)
Julian	1 December, AD 2026 (AM 7535)
Julian day	2461389
Maya	13.0.14.3.6; 19 Mac, 1 Cimi
Roman	Kalendis Decembribus, MMDCCLXXIX AUC
Solar Hijri	23 Azar, SH 1405

<<	December					>>
Su	Mo	Tu	We	Th	Fr	Sa
		1	2	3	4	5
6	7	8	9	10	11	12
13	14	15	16	17	18	19
20	21	22	23	24	25	26
27	28	29	30	31
2026

December 14 in recent years
2025 (Sunday)
2024 (Saturday)
2023 (Thursday)
2022 (Wednesday)
2021 (Tuesday)
2020 (Monday)
2019 (Saturday)
2018 (Friday)
2017 (Thursday)
2016 (Wednesday)

December 14 is the 348th day of the year (349th in leap years) in the Gregorian calendar; 17 days remain until the end of the year.

== Events ==
=== Pre-1600 ===
- 557 – Constantinople is severely damaged by an earthquake, which cracks the dome of Hagia Sophia.
- 835 – Sweet Dew Incident: Emperor Wenzong of the Tang dynasty conspires to kill the powerful eunuchs of the Tang court, but the plot is foiled.
- 872 – Pope John VIII is elected following the death of Hadrian II.
- 1287 – St. Lucia's flood: The Zuiderzee sea wall in the Netherlands collapses, killing over 50,000 people.
- 1542 – Princess Mary Stuart becomes Queen of Scots at the age of one week on the death of her father, King James V.

=== 1601–1900 ===
- 1751 – The Theresian Military Academy is founded in Wiener Neustadt, Austria.
- 1780 – Founding Father Alexander Hamilton marries Elizabeth Schuyler Hamilton at the Schuyler Mansion in Albany, New York.
- 1782 – The Montgolfier brothers first test fly an unmanned hot air balloon in France; it floats nearly 2.5 km (1.6 mi).
- 1812 – The French invasion of Russia comes to an end as the remnants of the Grande Armée are expelled from Russia.
- 1814 – War of 1812: The Royal Navy seizes control of Lake Borgne, Louisiana.
- 1819 – Alabama becomes the 22nd U.S. state.
- 1836 – The Toledo War unofficially ends as the "Frostbitten Convention" votes to accept Congress' terms for admitting Michigan as a U.S. state.
- 1863 – American Civil War: The Confederate victory under General James Longstreet at the Battle of Bean's Station in East Tennessee ends the Knoxville Campaign, but achieves very little as Longstreet returns to Virginia next spring.
- 1896 – The Glasgow Underground Railway is opened by the Glasgow District Subway Company.
- 1900 – Quantum mechanics: Max Planck presents a theoretical derivation of his black-body radiation law (quantum theory) at the Physic Society in Berlin.

=== 1901–present ===
- 1902 – The Commercial Pacific Cable Company lays the first Pacific telegraph cable, from San Francisco to Honolulu.
- 1903 – The Wright brothers make their first attempt to fly with the Wright Flyer at Kitty Hawk, North Carolina.
- 1907 – The Thomas W. Lawson, the largest ever ship without a heat engine, runs aground and founders near the Hellweather's Reef within the Isles of Scilly in a gale. The pilot and 15 seamen die.
- 1909 – New South Wales Premier Charles Wade signs the Seat of Government Surrender Act 1909, formally completing the transfer of State land to the Commonwealth to create the Australian Capital Territory.
- 1911 – Roald Amundsen's team, comprising himself, Olav Bjaaland, Helmer Hanssen, Sverre Hassel, and Oscar Wisting, becomes the first to reach the South Pole.
- 1913 – Haruna, the fourth and last Kongō-class ship, launches, eventually becoming one of the Japanese workhorses during World War I and World War II.
- 1914 – Lisandro de la Torre and others found the Democratic Progressive Party (Partido Demócrata Progresista, PDP) at the Hotel Savoy, Buenos Aires, Argentina.
- 1918 – Friedrich Karl von Hessen, a German prince elected by the Parliament of Finland to become King of Finland, renounces the throne.
- 1918 – Portuguese President Sidónio Pais is assassinated.
- 1918 – The 1918 United Kingdom general election occurs, the first where women were permitted to vote. In Ireland the Irish republican political party Sinn Féin wins a landslide victory with nearly 47% of the popular vote.
- 1918 – Giacomo Puccini's comic opera Gianni Schicchi premieres at the Metropolitan Opera in New York City.
- 1925 – Wozzeck, Alban Berg's first opera, is premiered at the Berlin State Opera conducted by Erich Kleiber.
- 1939 – Winter War: The Soviet Union is expelled from the League of Nations for invading Finland.
- 1940 – Plutonium (specifically Pu-238) is first isolated at Berkeley, California.
- 1942 – An Aeroflot Tupolev ANT-20 crashes near Tashkent, killing all 36 people on board.
- 1948 – Thomas T. Goldsmith Jr. and Estle Ray Mann are granted a patent for their cathode-ray tube amusement device, the earliest known interactive electronic game.
- 1955 – Albania, Austria, Bulgaria, Cambodia, Ceylon, Finland, Hungary, Ireland, Italy, Jordan, Laos, Libya, Nepal, Portugal, Romania and Spain join the United Nations through United Nations Security Council Resolution 109.
- 1958 – The 3rd Soviet Antarctic Expedition becomes the first to reach the southern pole of inaccessibility.
- 1960 – Convention against Discrimination in Education of UNESCO is adopted.
- 1962 – NASA's Mariner 2 becomes the first spacecraft to fly by Venus.
- 1963 – The dam containing the Baldwin Hills Reservoir bursts, killing five people and damaging hundreds of homes in Los Angeles, California.
- 1964 – American Civil Rights Movement: Heart of Atlanta Motel v. United States: The Supreme Court of the United States rules that Congress can use the Constitution's Commerce Clause to fight discrimination.
- 1971 – Bangladesh Liberation War: Over 200 of East Pakistan's intellectuals are executed by the Pakistan Army and their local allies. (The date is commemorated in Bangladesh as Martyred Intellectuals Day.)
- 1972 – Apollo program: Eugene Cernan is the most recent person to walk on the Moon, after he and Harrison Schmitt complete the third and final extravehicular activity (EVA) of the Apollo 17 mission.
- 1981 – Arab–Israeli conflict: Israel's Knesset ratifies the Golan Heights Law, extending Israeli law to the Golan Heights.
- 1985 – Wilma Mankiller takes office as the first woman elected to serve as Principal Chief of the Cherokee Nation.
- 1986 – Qasba Aligarh massacre: Over 400 Muhajirs killed in revenge killings in Qasba colony after a raid on Pashtun heroin processing and distribution center in Sohrab Goth by the security forces.
- 1992 – War in Abkhazia: Siege of Tkvarcheli: A helicopter carrying evacuees from Tkvarcheli is shot down, resulting in at least 52 deaths, including 25 children. The incident catalyses more concerted Russian military intervention on behalf of Abkhazia.
- 1994 – Construction begins on the Three Gorges Dam on the Yangtze river.
- 1995 – Yugoslav Wars: The Dayton Agreement is signed in Paris by the leaders of the Federal Republic of Yugoslavia, Croatia, and Bosnia and Herzegovina. On the same day, NATO began ground peacekeeping operations in Bosnia and Herzegovina.
- 1998 – Yugoslav Wars: The Yugoslav Army ambushes a group of Kosovo Liberation Army fighters attempting to smuggle weapons from Albania into Kosovo, killing 36.
- 1999 – Torrential rains cause flash floods in Vargas, Venezuela, resulting in tens of thousands of deaths, the destruction of thousands of homes, and the complete collapse of the state's infrastructure.
- 2003 – Pakistani President Pervez Musharraf narrowly escapes an assassination attempt.
- 2004 – The Millau Viaduct, the tallest bridge in the world, is formally inaugurated near Millau, France.
- 2012 – Sandy Hook Elementary School shooting: Twenty-eight people, including the gunman, are killed in Sandy Hook, Connecticut.
- 2013 – A reported coup attempt in South Sudan leads to continued fighting and hundreds of casualties.
- 2017 – The Walt Disney Company announces that it would acquire 21st Century Fox, including the 20th Century Fox movie studio, for $52.4 billion.
- 2020 – A total solar eclipse is visible from parts of the South Pacific Ocean, southern South America, and the South Atlantic Ocean.
- 2025 – At least 16 people are killed, including one gunman, and 43 injured in a mass shooting during a Hanukkah celebration at Bondi Beach in the deadliest terror incident in Australia.

== Births ==
=== Pre-1600 ===
- 1009 – Go-Suzaku, emperor of Japan (died 1045)
- 1332 – Frederick III, German nobleman (died 1381)
- 1546 – Tycho Brahe, Danish astronomer and chemist (died 1601)
- 1599 – Charles Berkeley, 2nd Viscount Fitzhardinge, English politician (died 1668)

=== 1601–1900 ===
- 1607 – János Kemény, Hungarian prince (died 1662)
- 1625 – Barthélemy d'Herbelot, French orientalist and academic (died 1695)
- 1631 – Anne Conway, English philosopher and author (died 1679)
- 1640 – Aphra Behn, English playwright and author (died 1689)
- 1678 – Daniel Neal, English historian and author (died 1743)
- 1720 – Justus Möser, German jurist and theorist (died 1794)
- 1730 – Capel Bond, English organist and composer (died 1790)
- 1738 – Jan Antonín Koželuh, Czech composer and educator (died 1814)
- 1775 – Philander Chase, American bishop and educator, founded Kenyon College (died 1852)
- 1775 – Thomas Cochrane, 10th Earl of Dundonald, Scottish admiral and politician (died 1860)
- 1777 – Du Pré Alexander, 2nd Earl of Caledon, Irish politician, Lord Lieutenant of Tyrone (died 1839)
- 1784 – Princess Maria Antonia of Naples and Sicily (died 1806)
- 1789 – Maria Szymanowska, Polish composer and pianist (died 1831)
- 1791 – Charles Wolfe, Irish priest and poet (died 1823)
- 1794 – Erastus Corning, American businessman and politician (died 1872)
- 1816 – Abraham Hochmuth, Hungarian rabbi and educator (died 1889)
- 1824 – Pierre Puvis de Chavannes, French painter and illustrator (died 1898)
- 1832 – Daniel H. Reynolds, American general, lawyer, and politician (died 1902)
- 1851 – Mary Tappan Wright, American novelist and short story writer (died 1916)
- 1852 – Daniel De Leon, Curaçaoan-American journalist and politician (died 1914)
- 1856 – Louis Marshall, American lawyer and activist (died 1929)
- 1866 – Roger Fry, English painter and critic (died 1934)
- 1870 – Karl Renner, Austrian lawyer and politician, 4th President of Austria (died 1950)
- 1881 – Katherine MacDonald, American actress and producer (died 1956)
- 1883 – Manolis Kalomiris, Greek pianist and composer (died 1962)
- 1883 – Morihei Ueshiba, Japanese martial artist, developed aikido (died 1969)
- 1884 – Jane Cowl, American actress and playwright (died 1950)
- 1887 – Virgil Madgearu, Romanian economist, sociologist (died 1940)
- 1887 – Xul Solar, Argentinian painter and sculptor (died 1963)
- 1894 – Alexander Nelke, Estonian-American painter and carpenter (died 1974)
- 1895 – George VI of the United Kingdom (died 1952)
- 1895 – Paul Éluard, French poet and author (died 1952)
- 1896 – Jimmy Doolittle, American general and pilot, Medal of Honor recipient (died 1993)
- 1897 – Kurt Schuschnigg, Italian-Austrian lawyer and politician, 15th Federal Chancellor of Austria (died 1977)
- 1897 – Margaret Chase Smith, American educator and politician (died 1995)
- 1899 – DeFord Bailey, American Hall of Fame country and blues musician (died 1982)

=== 1901–present ===
- 1901 – Henri Cochet, French tennis player (died 1987)
- 1901 – Paul of Greece (died 1964)
- 1902 – Frances Bavier, American actress (died 1989)
- 1902 – Herbert Feigl, Austrian philosopher from the Vienna Circle (died 1988)
- 1903 – Walter Rangeley, English sprinter (died 1982)
- 1904 – Virginia Coffey, American civil rights activist (died 2003)
- 1908 – Morey Amsterdam, American actor, singer, and screenwriter (died 1996)
- 1908 – Claude Davey, Welsh rugby player (died 2001)
- 1908 – Mária Szepes, Hungarian journalist, author, and screenwriter (died 2007)
- 1909 – Edward Lawrie Tatum, American geneticist and academic, Nobel Prize laureate (died 1975)
- 1911 – Jerzy Iwanow-Szajnowicz, Greek-Polish swimmer and water polo player (died 1943)
- 1911 – Spike Jones, American singer and bandleader (died 1965)
- 1911 – Hans von Ohain, German-American physicist and engineer (died 1998)
- 1914 – Karl Carstens, German lieutenant and politician, 5th President of the Federal Republic of Germany (died 1992)
- 1914 – Rosalyn Tureck, American pianist and harpsichord player (died 2003)
- 1915 – Dan Dailey, American dancer and actor (died 1978)
- 1916 – Shirley Jackson, American novelist and short story writer (died 1965)
- 1917 – C.-H. Hermansson, Swedish author and politician (died 2016)
- 1917 – Elyse Knox, American actress and fashion designer (died 2012)
- 1917 – June Taylor, American dancer and choreographer (died 2004)
- 1918 – James T. Aubrey, American broadcaster (died 1994)
- 1918 – Radu Beligan, Romanian actor and director (died 2016)
- 1918 – B. K. S. Iyengar, Indian yoga instructor and author, founded Iyengar Yoga (died 2014)
- 1920 – Clark Terry, American trumpet player, composer, and educator (died 2015)
- 1922 – Nikolay Basov, Russian physicist and academic, Nobel Prize laureate (died 2001)
- 1922 – Don Hewitt, American journalist and producer, created 60 Minutes (died 2009)
- 1922 – Junior J. Spurrier, American sergeant, Medal of Honor recipient (died 1984)
- 1923 – Gerard Reve, Dutch-Belgian author and poet (died 2006)
- 1924 – Raj Kapoor, Indian actor, director, and producer (died 1988)
- 1927 – Richard Cassilly, American tenor and actor (died 1998)
- 1927 – Koos Rietkerk, Dutch lawyer and politician, Dutch Minister of the Interior (died 1986)
- 1929 – Ron Jarden, New Zealand rugby player (died 1977)
- 1930 – Margaret Bakkes, South African author (died 2016)
- 1930 – David R. Harris, English geographer, anthropologist, and archaeologist (died 2013)
- 1930 – Fred Gray, American attorney, civil rights movement legal representative
- 1931 – Jon Elia, Pakistani philosopher, poet, and scholar (died 2002)
- 1931 – Vladimir-Georg Karassev-Orgusaar, Estonian director and politician (died 2015)
- 1932 – George Furth, American actor and playwright (died 2008)
- 1932 – Abbe Lane, American actress, singer, and dancer
- 1932 – Charlie Rich, American singer-songwriter and guitarist (died 1995)
- 1934 – Shyam Benegal, Indian director and screenwriter (died 2024)
- 1934 – Charlie Hodge, American guitarist and singer (died 2006)
- 1934 – Hal Williams, American actor (died 2026)
- 1935 – Lewis Arquette, American actor, producer, and screenwriter (died 2001)
- 1935 – Lee Remick, American actress (died 1991)
- 1938 – Leonardo Boff, Brazilian theologian and author
- 1938 – Charlie Griffith, Barbadian cricketer
- 1939 – Ann Cryer, English academic and politician
- 1939 – Ernie Davis, American football player (died 1963)
- 1940 – Lex Gold, Scottish footballer and civil servant
- 1941 – Karan Armstrong, American soprano and actress (died 2021)
- 1941 – Ellen Willis, American journalist, critic, and academic (died 2006)
- 1942 – Chris Harris, English actor and director (died 2014)
- 1942 – Dick Wagner, American singer-songwriter and guitarist (died 2014)
- 1943 – Britt Allcroft, English writer (died 2024)
- 1943 – Tommy McAvoy, Scottish politician (died 2024)
- 1943 – Emmett Tyrrell, American journalist, author, and publisher, founded The American Spectator
- 1944 – Graham Kirkham, Baron Kirkham, English businessman, founded DFS
- 1944 – Denis Thwaites, English professional footballer murdered in the 2015 Sousse attacks (died 2015)
- 1946 – Antony Beevor, English historian and author
- 1946 – Jane Birkin, English-French actress and singer (died 2023)
- 1946 – John Du Prez, English conductor and composer
- 1946 – Patty Duke, American actress (died 2016)
- 1946 – Ruth Fuchs, German javelin thrower and politician (died 2023)
- 1946 – Peter Lorimer, Scottish footballer (died 2021)
- 1946 – Michael Ovitz, American talent agent, co-founded Creative Artists Agency
- 1946 – Stan Smith, American tennis player and coach
- 1946 – Lynne Marie Stewart, American actress (died 2025)
- 1946 – Joyce Vincent Wilson, American singer
- 1947 – Christopher Parkening, American guitarist and educator
- 1947 – Dilma Rousseff, Brazilian economist and politician, 36th President of Brazil
- 1948 – Lester Bangs, American journalist and author (died 1982)
- 1948 – Kim Beazley, Australian politician and diplomat, 9th Deputy Prime Minister of Australia
- 1948 – Boudewijn Büch, Dutch author, poet, and television host (died 2002)
- 1948 – Peeter Kreitzberg, Estonian lawyer and politician (died 2011)
- 1948 – Dee Wallace, American actress
- 1949 – Bill Buckner, American baseball player and manager (died 2019)
- 1949 – David A. Cherry, American artist and illustrator
- 1949 – Cliff Williams, Australian bass player
- 1951 – John Brown, American basketball player
- 1951 – Jan Timman, Dutch chess player and author (died 2026)
- 1952 – John Lurie, American actor, saxophonist, painter, director, and producer
- 1953 – Vijay Amritraj, Indian tennis player and sportscaster
- 1953 – Wade Davis, Canadian anthropologist, author, and photographer
- 1953 – René Eespere, Estonian composer
- 1953 – Vangelis Meimarakis, Greek lawyer and politician, 4th Greek Minister for National Defence
- 1953 – Mikael Odenberg, Swedish soldier and politician, 29th Swedish Minister for Defence
- 1954 – Alan Kulwicki, American race car driver (died 1993)
- 1954 – Steve MacLean, Canadian physicist and astronaut
- 1955 – Jane Crafter, Australian golfer
- 1955 – Jill Pipher, American mathematician and academic
- 1956 – Linda Fabiani, Scottish politician
- 1956 – Hanni Wenzel, German skier
- 1958 – Mike Scott, Scottish singer-songwriter and guitarist
- 1958 – Spider Stacy, English singer-songwriter and guitarist
- 1959 – Bob Paris, American-Canadian bodybuilder and actor
- 1959 – Jorge Vaca, Mexican boxer
- 1960 – James Comey, American lawyer, 7th Director of the Federal Bureau of Investigation
- 1960 – Don Franklin, American actor
- 1960 – Chris Waddle, English footballer, manager, and sportscaster
- 1960 – Diane Williams, American sprinter
- 1961 – Patrik Sundström, Swedish ice hockey player
- 1963 – Greg Abbott, English footballer and manager
- 1963 – William Bedford, American basketball player
- 1963 – Diana Gansky, German discus thrower
- 1963 – Cynthia Gibb, American actress and model
- 1964 – Dino Stamatopoulos, American writer, producer, and actor
- 1965 – Craig Biggio, American baseball player and coach
- 1965 – Ken Hill, American baseball player
- 1965 – Ted Raimi, American actor, director, and screenwriter
- 1966 – Fabrizio Giovanardi, Italian race car driver
- 1966 – Carl Herrera, Trinidadian-Venezuelan basketball player
- 1966 – Anthony Mason, American basketball player (died 2015)
- 1966 – Bill Ranford, Canadian ice hockey player and coach
- 1966 – Tim Sköld, Swedish bass player and producer
- 1966 – Helle Thorning-Schmidt, Danish academic and politician, 41st Prime Minister of Denmark
- 1967 – Ewa Białołęcka, Polish author
- 1967 – Hanne Haugland, Norwegian high jumper and coach
- 1968 – Kelley Armstrong, Canadian author
- 1968 – Mohamed Saad, Egyptian actor
- 1969 – Scott Hatteberg, American baseball player and sportscaster
- 1969 – Archie Kao, American actor and producer
- 1969 – Natascha McElhone, English-Irish actress
- 1969 – Dave Nilsson, Australian baseball player and manager
- 1969 – Arthur Numan, Dutch footballer and manager
- 1970 – Anna Maria Jopek, Polish singer-songwriter, pianist, and producer
- 1970 – Beth Orton, English singer-songwriter and guitarist
- 1971 – Michaela Watkins, American actor and comedian
- 1972 – Miranda Hart, English actress
- 1972 – Marcus Jensen, American baseball player and coach
- 1973 – Falk Balzer, German hurdler
- 1973 – Pat Burke, Irish basketball player
- 1973 – Tomasz Radzinski, Canadian soccer player
- 1973 – Saulius Štombergas, Lithuanian basketball player and coach
- 1974 – Billy Koch, American baseball player
- 1975 – Justin Furstenfeld, American singer-songwriter, guitarist, and producer
- 1975 – Ben Kay, English rugby player
- 1975 – KaDee Strickland, American actress
- 1976 – Tammy Blanchard, American actress and singer
- 1976 – Leland Chapman, American bounty hunter
- 1976 – Sebastien Chaule, French-German rugby player
- 1976 – André Couto, Portuguese race car driver
- 1976 – Santiago Ezquerro, Spanish footballer
- 1977 – Brendan Nash, Australian-Jamaican cricketer
- 1977 – Jamie Peacock, English rugby player and manager
- 1978 – Dean Brogan, Australian footballer and coach
- 1978 – Shedrack Kibet Korir, Kenyan runner
- 1978 – Zdeněk Pospěch, Czech footballer
- 1978 – Patty Schnyder, Swiss tennis player
- 1978 – Kim St-Pierre, Canadian ice hockey player
- 1979 – Autumn Durald Arkapaw, American cinematographer
- 1979 – Jean-Alain Boumsong, French footballer
- 1979 – Andrei Makrov, Estonian ice hockey player
- 1979 – Kyle Shanahan, American football coach
- 1979 – Sophie Monk, English-Australian singer-songwriter and actress
- 1979 – Michael Owen, English footballer and sportscaster
- 1980 – Thed Björk, Swedish race car driver
- 1980 – Gordon Greer, Scottish footballer
- 1980 – Didier Zokora, Ivorian footballer
- 1981 – Amber Chia, Malaysian model
- 1981 – Johnny Jeter, American wrestler
- 1981 – Liam Lawrence, Irish footballer
- 1981 – Shaun Marcum, American baseball player
- 1982 – Josh Fields, American baseball player
- 1982 – Steve Sidwell, English footballer
- 1982 – Anthony Way, English singer and actor
- 1983 – Leanne Mitchell, English singer-songwriter
- 1984 – Chris Brunt, Northern Irish footballer
- 1984 – Rana Daggubati, Indian actor and producer
- 1984 – Ed Rainsford, Zimbabwean cricketer
- 1984 – Jackson Rathbone, American actor, singer, and musician
- 1985 – Jakub Błaszczykowski, Polish footballer
- 1985 – Alex Pennie, Welsh keyboard player
- 1985 – Tom Smith, English-Welsh rugby player
- 1985 – Nonami Takizawa, Japanese actress and singer
- 1987 – Kenneth Medwood, Belizean-American hurdler
- 1988 – Nicolas Batum, French basketball player
- 1988 – Nate Ebner, American football player
- 1988 – Vanessa Hudgens, American actress and singer
- 1988 – Hayato Sakamoto, Japanese baseball player
- 1989 – Pedro Botelho, Brazilian footballer
- 1989 – Sam Burgess, English rugby league player
- 1989 – Onew, South Korean singer-songwriter and dancer
- 1990 – Robert Covington, American basketball player
- 1991 – Ben Henry, New Zealand rugby league player
- 1991 – Offset, American rapper
- 1992 – Tori Kelly, American singer-songwriter
- 1992 – Ryo Miyaichi, Japanese footballer
- 1993 – Antonio Giovinazzi, Italian race car driver
- 1994 – Kuldeep Yadav, Indian cricketer
- 1995 – Ivan Barbashev, Russian ice hockey player
- 1995 – Calvyn Justus, South African swimmer
- 1995 – Álvaro Odriozola, Spanish footballer
- 1996 – Barbie Ferreira, American actress and model
- 1996 – Raphinha, Brazilian footballer
- 1996 – Li Zijun, Chinese figure skater
- 1997 – DK Metcalf, American football player
- 1998 – Lonnie Walker IV, American basketball player
- 1998 – Kim Ji-woong, South Korean singer and actor
- 2001 – Joshua Rush, American actor and activist
- 2002 – Francisco Conceição, Portuguese footballer

== Deaths ==
=== Pre-1600 ===
- 618 – Xue Rengao, emperor of Qin
- 648 – John III of the Sedre, Syriac Orthodox Patriarch of Antioch
- 704 – Aldfrith, king of Northumbria (or 705)
- 872 – Pope Adrian II (born 792)
- 1077 – Agnes of Poitou, Holy Roman Empress and regent (born c. 1025)
- 1293 – Al-Ashraf Khalil, Mamluk sultan of Egypt
- 1311 – Margaret of Brabant, German queen consort (born 1276)
- 1332 – Rinchinbal Khan, Mongolian emperor (born 1326)
- 1359 – Cangrande II della Scala, Lord of Verona (born 1332)
- 1417 – John Oldcastle, English Lollard leader
- 1460 – Guarino da Verona, Italian scholar and translator (born 1370)
- 1480 – Niccolò Perotti, humanist scholar (born 1429)
- 1503 – Sten Sture the Elder, regent of Sweden (born 1440)
- 1510 – Friedrich of Saxony (born 1473)
- 1542 – James V, King of Scotland (born 1512)
- 1591 – John of the Cross, Spanish priest and saint (born 1542)
- 1595 – Henry Hastings, 3rd Earl of Huntingdon (born 1535)

=== 1601–1900 ===
- 1624 – Charles Howard, 1st Earl of Nottingham, English politician, Lord High Admiral of England (born 1536)
- 1651 – Pierre Dupuy, French historian and scholar (born 1582)
- 1715 – Thomas Tenison, English archbishop (born 1636)
- 1735 – Thomas Tanner, English bishop and historian (born 1674)
- 1741 – Charles Rollin, French historian and educator (born 1661)
- 1785 – Giovanni Battista Cipriani, Italian painter and engraver (born 1727)
- 1788 – Carl Philipp Emanuel Bach, German pianist and composer (born 1714)
- 1788 – Charles III of Spain (born 1716)
- 1799 – George Washington, American general and politician, 1st President of the United States (born 1732)
- 1831 – Martin Baum, American businessman and politician, 5th Mayor of Cincinnati (born 1765)
- 1838 – Jean-Olivier Chénier, Canadian physician (born 1806)
- 1842 – Ben Crack-O, king of several tribes around Cape Palmas
- 1860 – George Hamilton-Gordon, 4th Earl of Aberdeen, Scottish-English politician, Prime Minister of the United Kingdom (born 1784)
- 1861 – Albert, Prince Consort of the United Kingdom (born 1819)
- 1865 – Johan Georg Forchhammer, Danish geologist and mineralogist (born 1794)
- 1873 – Louis Agassiz, Swiss-American zoologist and geologist (born 1807)
- 1878 – Princess Alice of the United Kingdom (born 1843)

=== 1901–present ===
- 1912 – Belgrave Edward Sutton Ninnis, English lieutenant and explorer (born 1887)
- 1915 – Eva Gouel, French choreographer and girlfriend of Pablo Picasso
- 1917 – Phil Waller, Welsh rugby player (born 1889)
- 1920 – George Gipp, American football player (born 1895)
- 1927 – Julian Sochocki, Russian mathematician and academic (born 1842)
- 1929 – Henry B. Jackson, British admiral (born 1855)
- 1935 – Stanley G. Weinbaum, American author (born 1902)
- 1937 – Fabián de la Rosa, Filipino painter and educator (born 1869)
- 1940 – Anton Korošec, Slovenian priest and politician, 10th Prime Minister of Yugoslavia (born 1872)
- 1943 – John Harvey Kellogg, American physician and businessman, co-invented corn flakes (born 1852)
- 1944 – Lupe Vélez, Mexican actress (born 1908)
- 1947 – Stanley Baldwin, English lieutenant and politician, Prime Minister of the United Kingdom (born 1867)
- 1947 – Edward Higgins, English-American 3rd General of The Salvation Army (born 1864)
- 1953 – Marjorie Kinnan Rawlings, American author and academic (born 1896)
- 1956 – Juho Kusti Paasikivi, Finnish lawyer and politician, 7th President of Finland (born 1870)
- 1963 – Dinah Washington, American singer and pianist (born 1924)
- 1964 – William Bendix, American actor (born 1906)
- 1970 – Franz Schlegelberger, German judge and politician, German Reich Minister of Justice (born 1876)
- 1971 – Mufazzal Haider Chaudhury, Bangladeshi linguist and scholar (born 1926)
- 1971 – Munier Choudhury, Bangladeshi author, playwright, and critic (born 1925)
- 1971 – Shahidullah Kaiser, Bangladeshi journalist and author (born 1927)
- 1974 – Walter Lippmann, American journalist and author (born 1889)
- 1975 – Arthur Treacher, English-American entertainer (born 1894)
- 1978 – Salvador de Madariaga, Spanish historian and diplomat, co-founded the College of Europe (born 1886)
- 1980 – Elston Howard, American baseball player and coach (born 1929)
- 1984 – Vicente Aleixandre, Spanish poet and academic, Nobel Prize laureate (born 1898)
- 1985 – Catherine Doherty, Russian-Canadian activist, founded the Madonna House Apostolate (born 1896)
- 1985 – Roger Maris, American baseball player and coach (born 1934)
- 1988 – Jean Schramme, Belgian mercenary, farmer, and convicted murderer (born 1929)
- 1989 – Jock Mahoney, American actor and stuntman (born 1919)
- 1989 – Andrei Sakharov, Russian physicist and activist, Nobel Prize laureate (born 1921)
- 1990 – Friedrich Dürrenmatt, Swiss author and playwright (born 1921)
- 1990 – Paula Nenette Pepin, French composer, pianist and lyricist (born 1908)
- 1991 – Robert Eddison, Japanese-English actor (born 1908)
- 1993 – Jeff Alm, American football player (born 1968)
- 1993 – Myrna Loy, American actress (born 1905)
- 1994 – Orval Faubus, American soldier and politician, 36th Governor of Arkansas (born 1910)
- 1995 – G. C. Edmondson, American soldier and author (born 1922)
- 1996 – Gaston Miron, Canadian poet and author (born 1928)
- 1997 – Stubby Kaye, American actor and comedian (born 1918)
- 1997 – Emily Cheney Neville, American author (born 1919)
- 1997 – Kurt Winter, Canadian guitarist and songwriter (born 1946)
- 1998 – Norman Fell, American actor and comedian (born 1924)
- 1998 – A. Leon Higginbotham Jr., American lawyer, judge, and activist (born 1928)
- 1998 – Annette Strauss, American philanthropist and politician, Mayor of Dallas (born 1924)
- 2001 – W. G. Sebald, German novelist, essayist, and poet (born 1944)
- 2003 – Jeanne Crain, American actress (born 1925)
- 2003 – Blas Ople, Filipino journalist and politician, 21st President of the Senate of the Philippines (born 1927)
- 2003 – Frank Sheeran, American union leader and mobster (born 1920)
- 2004 – Rod Kanehl, American baseball player (born 1934)
- 2004 – Fernando Poe Jr., Filipino actor, director, producer, and politician (born 1939)
- 2006 – Anton Balasingham, Sri Lankan-English strategist and negotiator (born 1938)
- 2006 – Ahmet Ertegun, Turkish-American composer and producer, co-founded Atlantic Records (born 1923)
- 2006 – Mike Evans, American actor and screenwriter (born 1949)
- 2009 – Alan A'Court, English footballer and manager (born 1934)
- 2010 – Timothy Davlin, American politician, Mayor of Springfield (born 1957)
- 2010 – Neva Patterson, American actress (born 1920)
- 2010 – Dale Roberts, English footballer (born 1986)
- 2011 – Joe Simon, American author and illustrator (born 1913)
- 2011 – Billie Jo Spears, American singer-songwriter (born 1937)
- 2012 – John Graham, English general (born 1923)
- 2012 – Edward Jones, American police officer and politician (born 1950)
- 2012 – Victoria Leigh Soto, American educator (born 1985)
- 2013 – Janet Dailey, American author (born 1944)
- 2013 – C. N. Karunakaran, Indian painter and illustrator (born 1940)
- 2013 – Dennis Lindley, English statistician and academic (born 1923)
- 2013 – Peter O'Toole, British-Irish actor (born 1932)
- 2013 – George Rodrigue, American painter (born 1944)
- 2014 – Theo Colborn, American zoologist and academic (born 1927)
- 2014 – Irene Dalis, American soprano and pianist (born 1925)
- 2014 – Louis Alphonse Koyagialo, Congolese politician, Prime Minister of the Democratic Republic of the Congo (born 1947)
- 2014 – Bess Myerson, American model, activist, game show panelist and television personality; Miss America 1945 (born 1924)
- 2014 – Fred Thurston, American football player (born 1933)
- 2015 – Terry Backer, American soldier and politician (born 1954)
- 2015 – Glen Sonmor, Canadian ice hockey player and coach (born 1929)
- 2015 – Vadym Tyshchenko, Ukrainian footballer and manager (born 1963)
- 2015 – Lillian Vernon, German-American businesswoman and philanthropist, founded the Lillian Vernon Company (born 1927)
- 2016 – Paulo Evaristo Arns, Brazilian cardinal (born 1921)
- 2016 – Bernard Fox, Welsh actor (born 1927)
- 2017 – Yu Kwang-chung, Chinese writer (born 1928)
- 2019 – Chuy Bravo, Mexican-American comedian and actor (born 1956)
- 2020 – Gérard Houllier, French Football manager (born 1947)
- 2022 – Jean Franco, American academic and literary critic (born 1924)
- 2023 – Tomáš Janovic, Slovak writer (born 1937)
- 2024 – Isak Andic, Turkish-Spanish billionaire businessman (born 1953)
- 2025 – Rob Reiner, American filmmaker and actor (born 1947)

== Holidays and observances ==
- Christian feast day:
  - Folcwin
  - John of the Cross
  - John III of the Sedre (Syriac Orthodox Church)
  - Blessed Mary Frances Schervier
  - Nicasius of Rheims
  - Nimatullah Kassab (Maronite Church)
  - Spyridon (Western Church)
  - Venantius Fortunatus
  - December 14 (Eastern Orthodox liturgics)
- Alabama Day (Alabama)
- Forty-seven Ronin Remembrance Day (Sengaku-ji, Tokyo)
- Martyred Intellectuals Day (Bangladesh)
- Monkey Day
