= Ene Rämmeld =

Estonian actress

- Born: 12 January 1947 (age 79); Tallinn, then part of Estonian SSR, Soviet Union
- Citizenship: Estonian
- Occupations: Actress, writer, cultural figure
- Years active: 1965–present
- Known for: Role of Tiina in Libahunt (1968)
- Spouse: Vladimir-Georg Karasjov-Orgusaar (m. ?–2015; his death)
- Children: Tarah Montbélialtz

Ene Rämmeld (born 12 January 1947) is an Estonian actress, writer, and cultural figure who has resided in France since 1981. Renowned for her roles in Estonian cinema during the Soviet era, including the lead role of Tiina in the 1968 film Libahunt, Rämmeld has also made significant contributions to theater and film in both Estonia and France. After emigrating, she performed Estonian poetry recitals globally and worked at the Centre Pompidou in Paris from 1995 to 2012. Rämmeld has authored several autobiographical works and remains active in cultural projects bridging Estonia and France..

== Early life ==
Ene Rämmeld was born on 12 January 1947 in Tallinn, Estonia, during the Soviet occupation. Her mother was a teacher in Maardu, where Rämmeld first performed on stage as a child. In the 1950s, her family relocated to Türi, a small town in central Estonia. From her first year at Türi Secondary School, she joined the school theater, performing under the mentorship of notable figures such as Heino Seljamaa and Andres Oks, who later worked at the Viljandi Theatre. She also participated in the Türi Cultural House drama group, which toured Estonia, nurturing her early passion for acting.

In the early 1960s, Rämmeld moved to Viljandi, where she studied drama direction at the Viljandi Culture Academy and began her professional career at the Ugala Theater.

== Career ==
=== Early Acting Career in Estonia (1960s–1980s) ===
Rämmeld began her acting career in 1965 as part of the Ugala Theatre’s supporting cast, notably playing Aliide in Oskar Luts’ Äripäev. Her breakthrough came in 1968 when she portrayed Tiina in Leida Laius' film Libahunt, a role that cemented her status in Estonian cinema. In 1971, she played Illi in Vladimir-Georg Karasjov-Orgusaar’s telemovie Lindpriid, which was banned for political reasons.

On stage, Rämmeld took on significant roles, including the titular part in Paul-Eerik Rummo's Tuhkatriinumäng (directed by Evald Hermaküla, Vanemuine Theatre, 1969) and the lead in the TV production Armastus, armastus (directed by Hermaküla, Eesti Televisioon, 1969). Her work during this period reflected her versatility and resistance to Soviet cultural constraints.

=== Emigration to France and International Work (1981–Present) ===
In May 1976, Rämmeld’s husband, Vladimir-Georg Karasjov-Orgusaar, sought political asylum in France, seeing no future in Soviet art. Rämmeld applied to join him with their son Tarah, born in 1972, but faced intense scrutiny from the KGB. After four and a half years of unemployment—during which she worked as a childcare provider, model, and club manager in Tallinn—permission to emigrate was granted in January 1981, aided by interventions from French cultural figures.

In France, Rämmeld performed Estonian poetry recitals across Europe, the United States, and Australia, returning to Estonia for acting projects from 1988 onward. She appeared in French films, including Claude Lelouch’s Viva la vie and Luc Besson’s Subway, often serving as a voice actress or radio performer due to her accent. From 1995 to 2012, she worked at the Pompidou Centre in Paris, retiring afterward. Since 2012, she has collaborated with Marge Loig of Tartu University’s Viljandi Culture Academy, creating poetry programs for schools and cultural venues in Southern Estonia.

In April 2024, Rämmeld began rehearsals at Endla Theatre for a solo performance of Inimese hääl (based on Jean Cocteau’s 1927 play), directed by Ervin Õunapuu, showcasing her continued engagement with theater.

She was married with to film director Vladimir-Georg Karasjov-Orgusaar.

== Writing and Cultural Contributions ==
Rämmeld has authored several autobiographical works, including:

- C'est la vie (Tänapäev, 2004, 160 pp.)
- Bonjour de Paris! (Tänapäev, 2006, 264 pp.)
- Ühel olematul suvel (Tänapäev, 2008, 112 pp.)
- Miks mitte? Pourquoi pas? (Tammerraamat, 2014)

Her writings reflect her life journey, from Soviet-era Estonia to her French exile, and have been featured in interviews on Vikerraadio and Estonian television. She has also contributed articles to Kroonika and Postimees, reporting on cultural events in France.

== Personal life ==
Rämmeld was married to Vladimir-Georg Karasjov-Orgusaar until his death in 2015, though the couple lived separately in France while pursuing their creative careers. Their son, Tarah (stage name Tarah Montbélialtz), born in 1972, co-translated Karl Ristikivi’s Inimese teekond for a 2002 bilingual poetry performance in Paris.

== Filmography and Theater ==
=== Film ===
  - Libahunt (1968) – Tiina
  - Lindpriid (1971, telemovie) – Illi
  - See kadunud tee (1990) – Salme
  - Kuhu põgenevad hinged (2007) – Dora
  - Viva la vie (Claude Lelouch, France) – Supporting role
  - Subway (Luc Besson, France) – Supporting role
  - Wiiralti unenägu (2010, documentary with Liina Keevallik) – Herself
  - Frida Rammi tähelaev (short film by Liina Keevallik) – Lead role

=== Theater ===
  - Äripäev (Ugala Theatre, 1965) – Aliide
  - Tuhkatriinumäng (Vanemuine, 1969) – Titular role
  - Armastus, armastus (Eesti Televisioon, 1969) – Lead role
  - Kas te armastate Brahmsi? (Vanemuine, 1994–1996) – Lead role
  - Ma tulen tagasi, tango (Salong-Teater, 1997) – Lead role
  - Inimese hääl (Endla Theatre, 2024) – Lead role

=== Poetry and Performance ===
  - Marie Underi mälestuskava (Théâtre Essaîon de Paris, 1983)
  - Chemin terrestre (La Guillotine, Paris, 2002) – Bilingual performance with Claude Merlini

== See also ==
- Libahunt
- Estonian cinema
- Ugala Theater
