= Presidents Day (disambiguation) =

Presidents' Day, Presidents Day, or President's Day is the informal name of Washington's Birthday, a United States national holiday that can also celebrate all US Presidents. It is held on the third Monday in February.

Presidents Day may also refer to:

- First President's Day (Kazakhstan), a commemorative day observed on December 1.
- Presidents' Day (Equatorial Guinea), a holiday celebrated on June 5.
- Presidents' Day (Botswana), a holiday held on the third Monday of July
- President's Day (film), a 2010 comedy horror movie

== See also ==
- North American blizzard of 2003 or Presidents' Day Storm II
