= Coma Berenicids =

Meteor shower

Comae Berenicids
- Celestial map of Coma Berenices
- Parent body: Unknown

Radiant
- Constellation: Coma Berenices
- Right ascension: 11^{h} 40^{m} -0^{s}
- Declination: +18° 00′ 00″

Properties
- Occurs during: December 12 to December 23
- Date of peak: December 16
- Velocity: 65 km/s
- Zenithal hourly rate: 3

Comae Berenicids [sic] (formerly Coma Berenicids, IMO designation: COM; IAU shower number: 20) is a minor meteor shower with a radiant in the constellation Coma Berenices. The shower appears from December 12 to December 23 with the estimated maximum around December 16. The radiant at that time is located at α=175°, δ=+18°. The shower's population index is 3.0 with the speed of 65 kilometres per second (40 mi/s).

The Comae Berenicids were first detected within the framework of Harvard Radio Meteor Project. The shower's existence was discovered by Richard Eugene McCrosky and A. Posen in 1959. The Comae Berenicids have an orbit very similar to the December Leo Minorids often leading to confusion between the two meteor showers.
