= Sigma Hydrids =

Meteor shower

- Celestial map of Hydra
- Parent body: Unknown; C/2023 P1 (Nishimura)?

Radiant
- Constellation: Hydra
- Right ascension: 8^{h} 19^{m} 60^{s}
- Declination: +02° 00′ 00″

Properties
- Occurs during: November 22 to January 4
- Date of peak: December 7
- Velocity: 58.8 km/s
- Zenithal hourly rate: 3-7

Sigma Hydrids are a faint, minor (Class II) meteor shower that peak around 7 December. The ZHR is 3-7 and population index is 3. They are active from November 22 to January 4.

Sigma hydrids were discovered by Richard E. McCrosky and Annette Posen.

== 2023 ==
Long-period comet C/2023 P1 (Nishimura) has been suggested to be the parent body of the meteor shower and came to perihelion (closest approach to the Sun) in September 2023. There is a chance of increased activity during the 2023 meteor shower if Earth passes through older meteoroid streams (such as 1591) that have had time to spread out over the comets orbit.
