= C/2023 P1 (Nishimura) =

Long-period comet

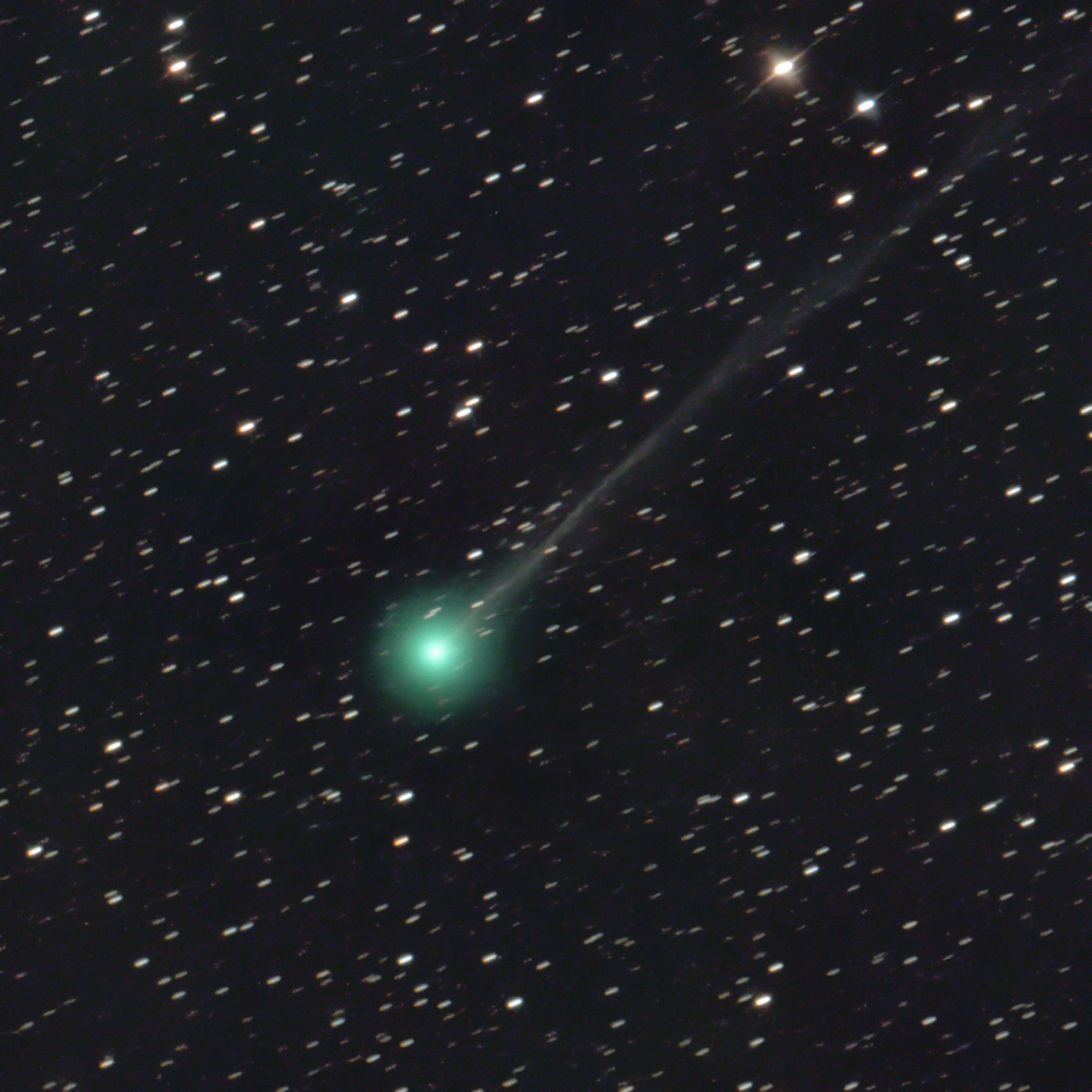
- Comet Nishimura photographed from Trevinca, Spain on 25 August 2023

Discovery
- Discovered by: Hideo Nishimura
- Discovery site: Kakegawa, Japan
- Discovery date: 12 August 2023

Designations
- Alternative designations: HN00003

Orbital characteristics
- Epoch: 8 September 2023 (JD 2460195.5)
- Observation arc: 495 days (1.36 years)
- Earliest precovery date: 19 January 2023
- Number of observations: 638
- Aphelion: 114 AU (1800); 109 AU (2200)
- Perihelion: 0.2252 AU
- Semi-major axis: 58 AU
- Eccentricity: 0.9961 (1800); 0.9959 (2200)
- Orbital period: ≈433 years (inbound) ≈406 years (outbound)
- Max. orbital speed: 88.7 km/s
- Inclination: 132.48°
- Longitude of ascending node: 66.834°
- Argument of periapsis: 116.30°
- Last perihelion: 17 September 2023 ≈1588–1592
- Next perihelion: ≈2429
- T_{Jupiter}: –0.307
- Earth MOID: 0.079 AU
- Jupiter MOID: 2.328 AU

Physical characteristics
- Mean radius: 3.015 km (1.873 mi)
- Comet total magnitude (M1): 12.2
- Apparent magnitude: 2.5 (2023 apparition)

C/2023 P1 (Nishimura) is a long-period comet discovered by Hideo Nishimura on 12 August 2023. The comet passed perihelion on 17 September 2023 and reached an apparent magnitude of about 2.5.

== Observational history ==
Japanese amateur astronomer Hideo Nishimura discovered the comet in images he obtained using a 200-mm f/3 telephoto lens mounted on a Canon EOS 6D on 12 August 2023, when the comet was 1.0 AU from the Sun. He also found it in images he exposed the previous night. The comet upon discovery was located in the dawn sky and moving closer to the Sun and has been less than 50 degrees from the Sun since April 2023. Its apparent magnitude was estimated to be around 10–11. Pre-discovery images from 19, 24, and 25 January 2023 from PanSTARRS were identified by Robert Weryk extending the observation arc to seven months. The comet appeared in them as a stellar object with an apparent magnitude of about 22.

The comet brightened rapidly and by 27 August its apparent magnitude was estimated to be 7.3 and its coma to have a diameter of 5 arcminutes, while a thin ion tail 1.5–2 degrees long is visible in photographs. The comet was spotted with the naked eye by Piotr Guzik on 8 September at an estimated magnitude of 4.7. The comet tail was up to 7.5 degrees long when imaged with CCD. On 12 September 2023 the comet passed 0.84 AU (126 million km; 78 million mi; 330 LD) from Earth but was only 15 degrees from the glare of the Sun.

Between 1 and 14 September 2023, the comet was observed from the Solar Orbiter (SolO) mission, where four tail disconnection events were reported, caused by the interaction of a series of coronal mass ejections (CMEs) to Nishimura's tail. By 17 September 2023 the comet came to perihelion about 0.22 AU (33 million km) from the Sun. The comet appeared briefly in the evening sky in mid September, being 5 degrees over the horizon 30 minutes after sunset at 35° north latitude. Even though the comet reached a naked eye apparent magnitude of around +2, it was difficult to locate against the glare of the Sun. After perihelion, the comet became visible in the coronograph of STEREO, without showing signs of disintegration. The comet was also observed by Parker Solar Probe on 27–28 September 2023, during encounter 17.

== Orbital characteristics ==
With an observation arc of seven months, the outbound orbital period of the comet is estimated to be about 406 years. An eccentricity of 0.996 gives the comet a semi-major axis of about 57 AU, which is comparable to the average distance of Eris at 68 AU. The comet will not leave the Solar System, will come to aphelion (farthest distance from the Sun) in late 2226, and return around the year 2429.

Perihelion
passages
302
723
1169
1588–1592
2023-09-17
2429

C/2023 P1 closest Earth approach on 12 September
Date and time of closest approach	Earth distance (AU)	Sun distance (AU)	Velocity relative to Earth (km/s)	Velocity relative to Sun (km/s)	Uncertainty region (3-sigma)	Solar elongation
12 September 2023 ≈09:20	0.838 AU (125.4 million km; 77.9 million mi; 326 LD)	0.292 AU (43.7 million km; 27.1 million mi; 114 LD)	107.0	77.9	± 300 km	14.9°

== Meteor shower ==
It is possible that Comet C/2023 P1 (Nishimura) may be related to the Sigma Hydrids meteor shower that is active November 22 to January 18 (peaking around November 30). The comet and the meteors have very similar orbit, with the meteor's perihelion having a very small offset from the comet. Alternatively, another yet-unknown comet was proposed as the parent body of the Sigma Hydrids, however a follow-up study in 2024 has verified the link between the meteor shower and Comet Nishimura after orbital reconstructions of the meteors matched that of the comet's precovery positions nearly 8 months before its discovery.

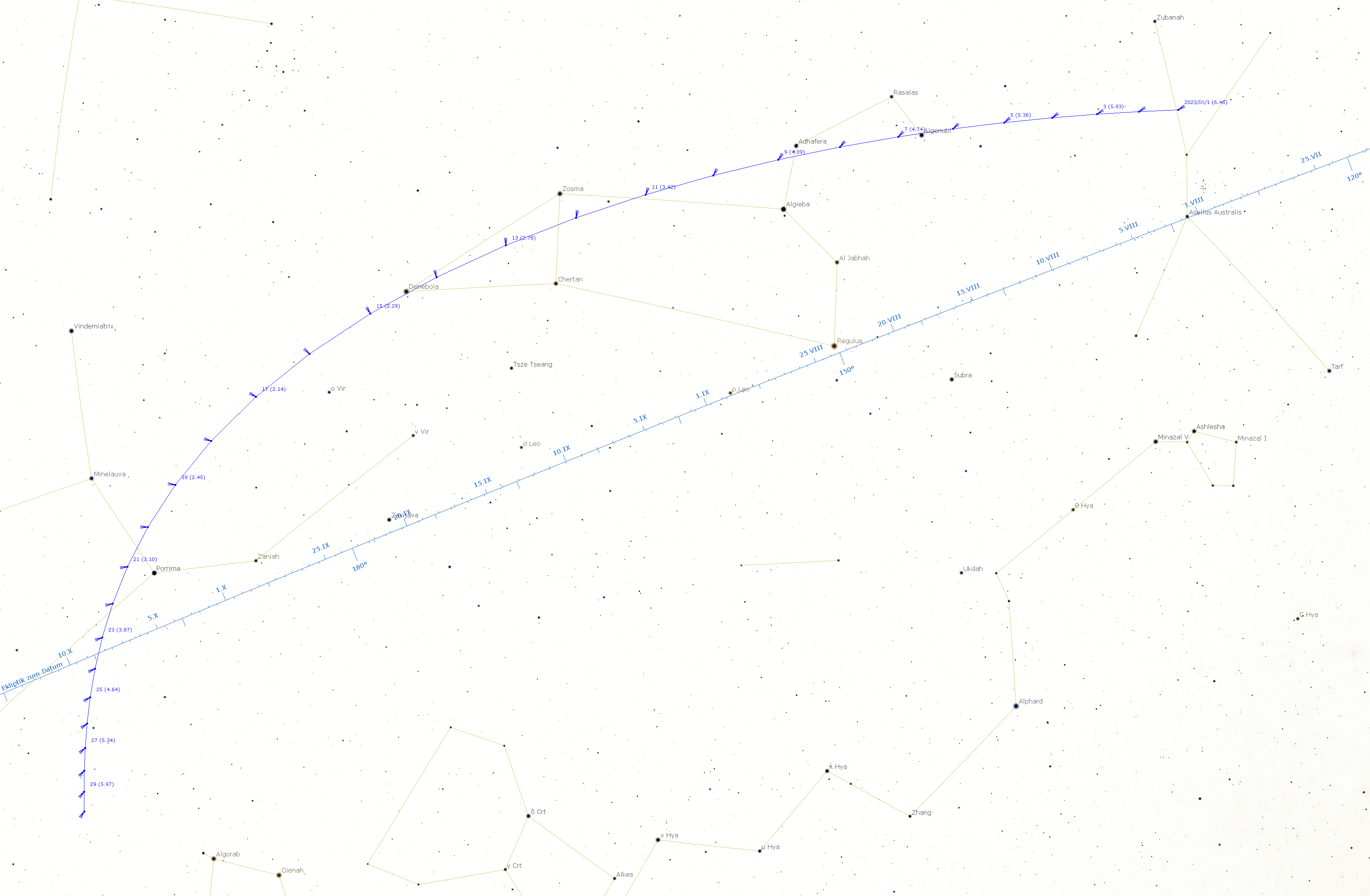
The position of comet C/2023 P1 (Nishimura) in the starry sky in September 2023: On September 1 at an apparent magnitude of 6.5^{m} in the upper right corner of the constellation Cancer.; From September 7 to 9 at an apparent magnitude of just over 4^{m} half to the upper right in the head of the constellation Leo.; On September 17 at an assumed apparent magnitude of 2^{m} left center in the constellation Virgo.; On September 30 at an assumed apparent magnitude of 6^{m} in the lower left corner on the boundary between the constellations Virgo and Corvus.

== Gallery ==
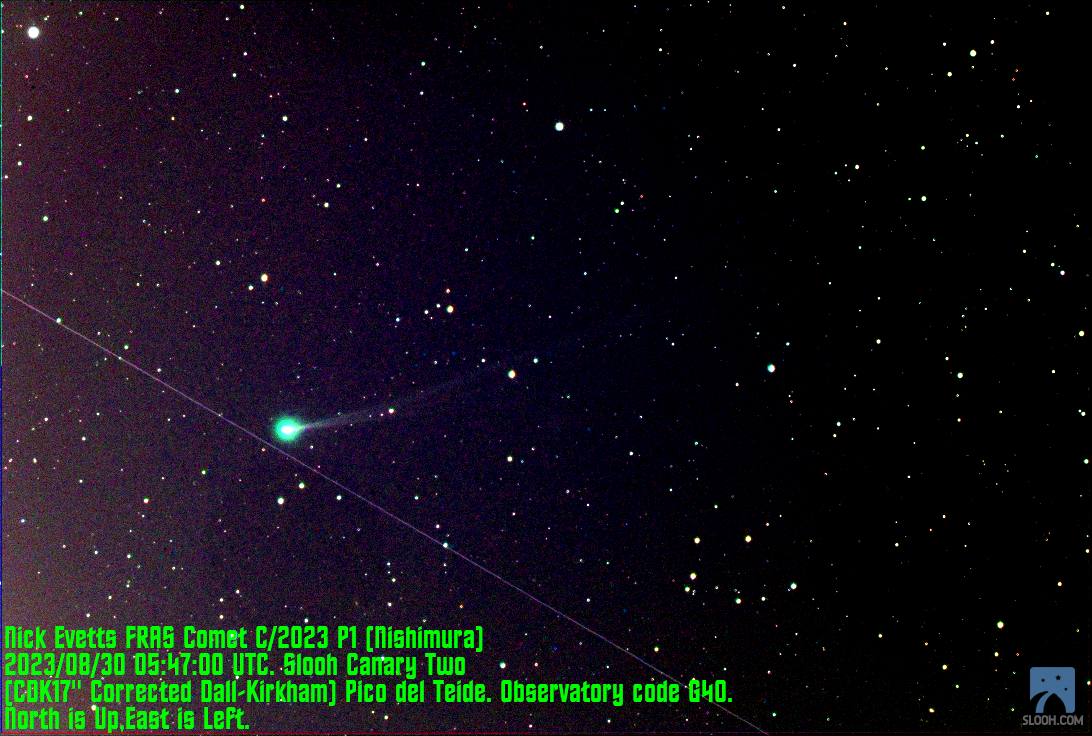
The comet on 30 August, from an online telescope

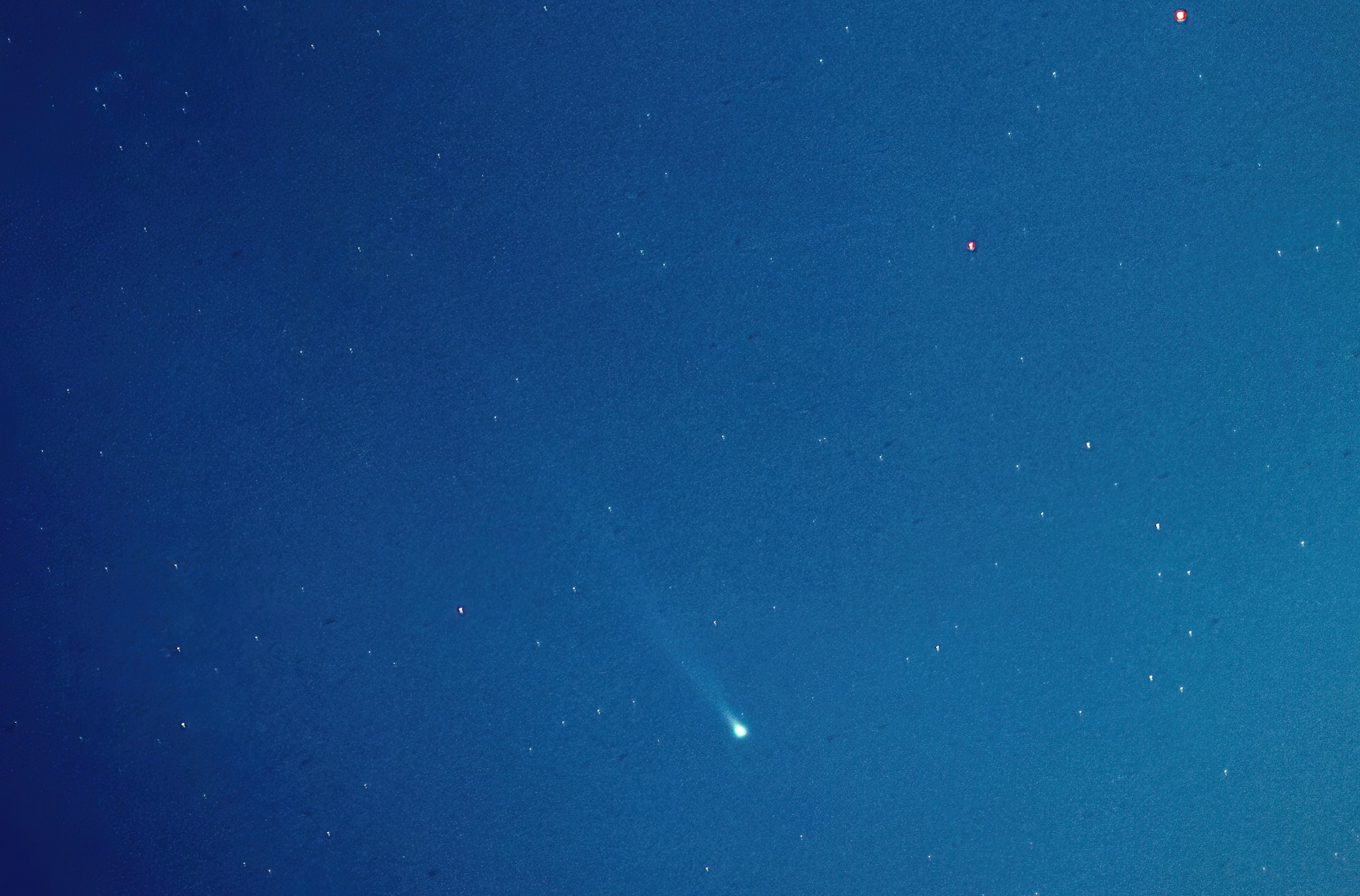
The comet on 6 September, with a telephoto lens

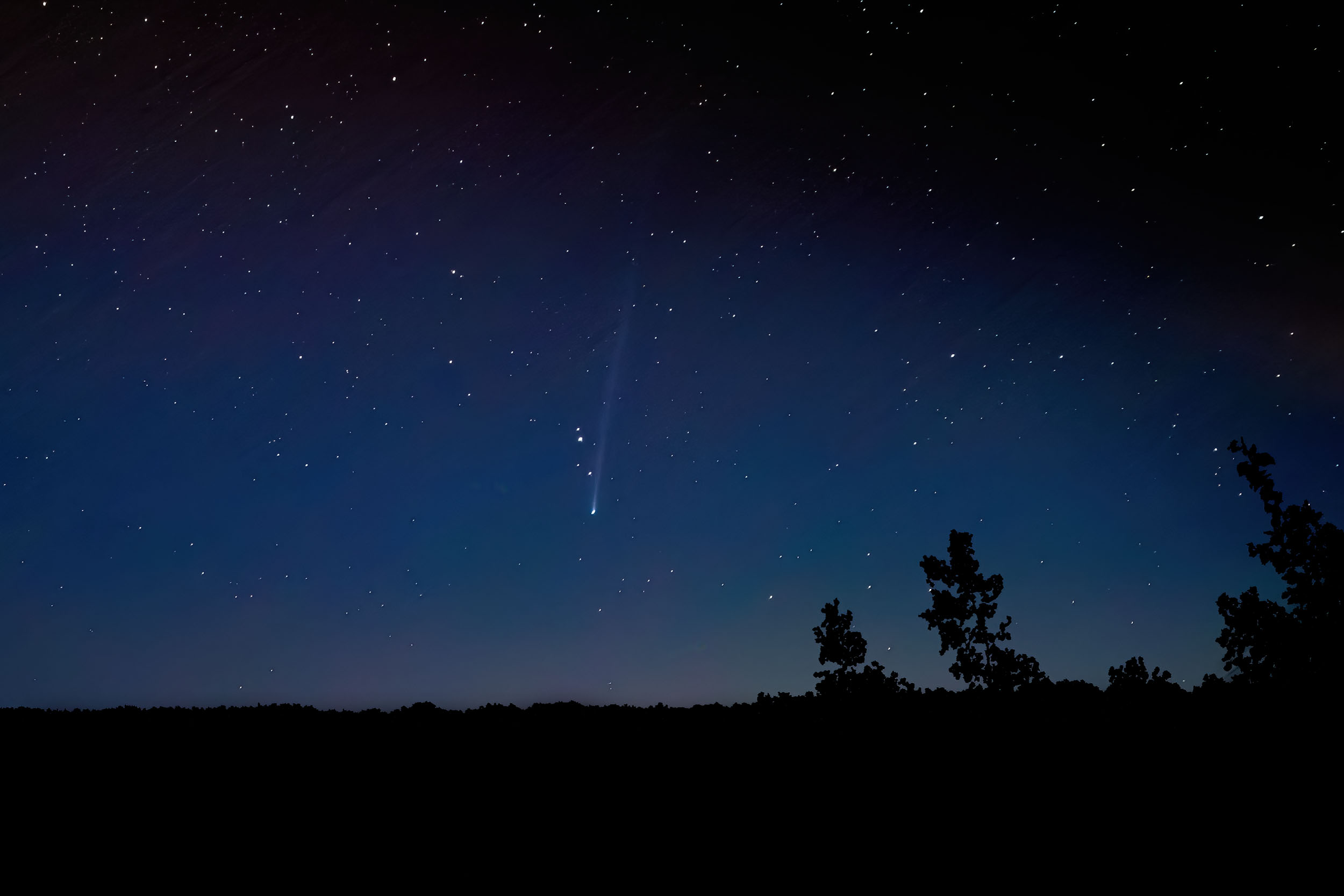
The comet in the dawn sky on 9 September

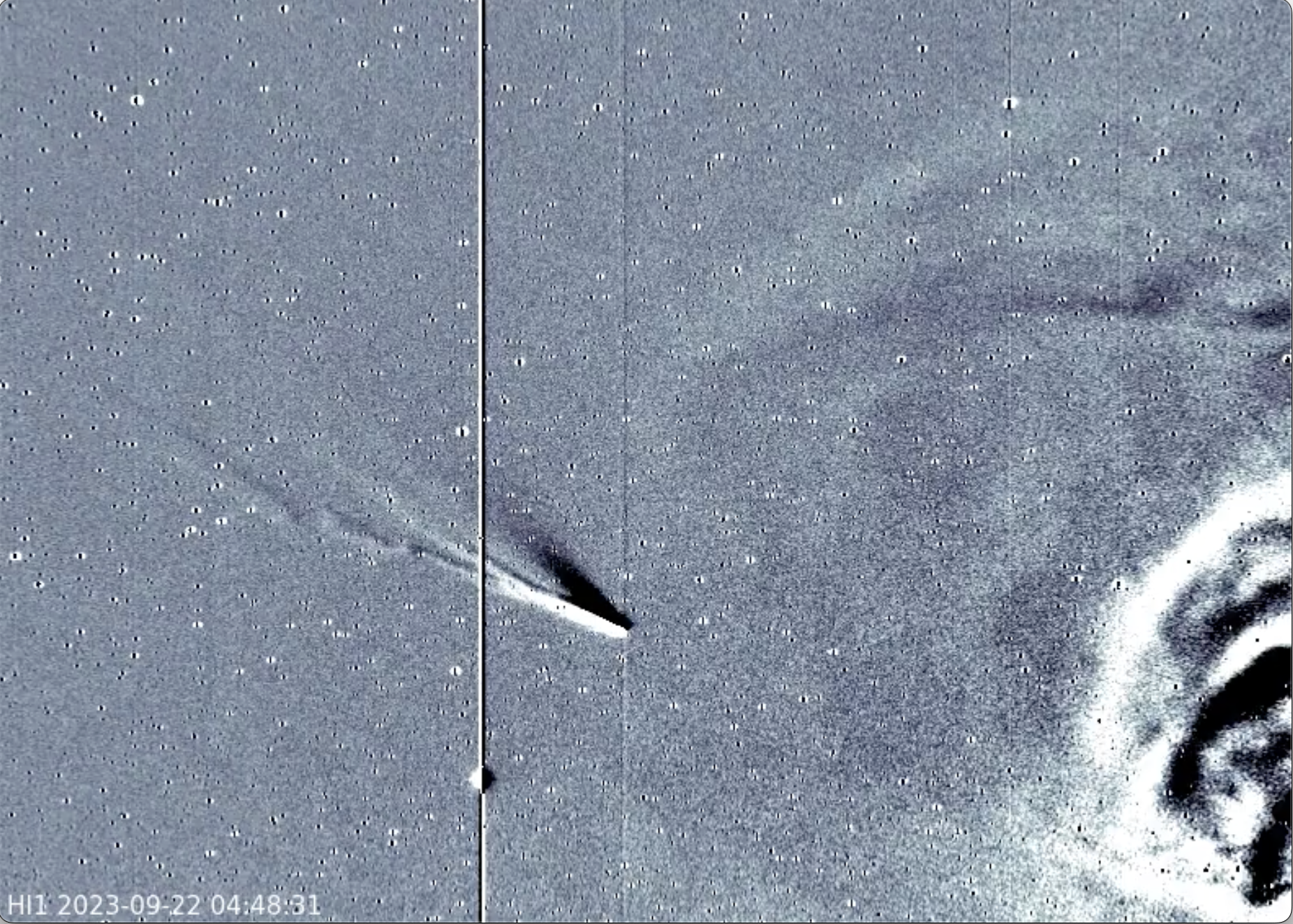
Comet Nishimura as seen from STEREO on 22 September
