= Convention on International Civil Aviation =

1944 treaty establishing rules of air travel

Chicago Convention
Convention on International Civil Aviation
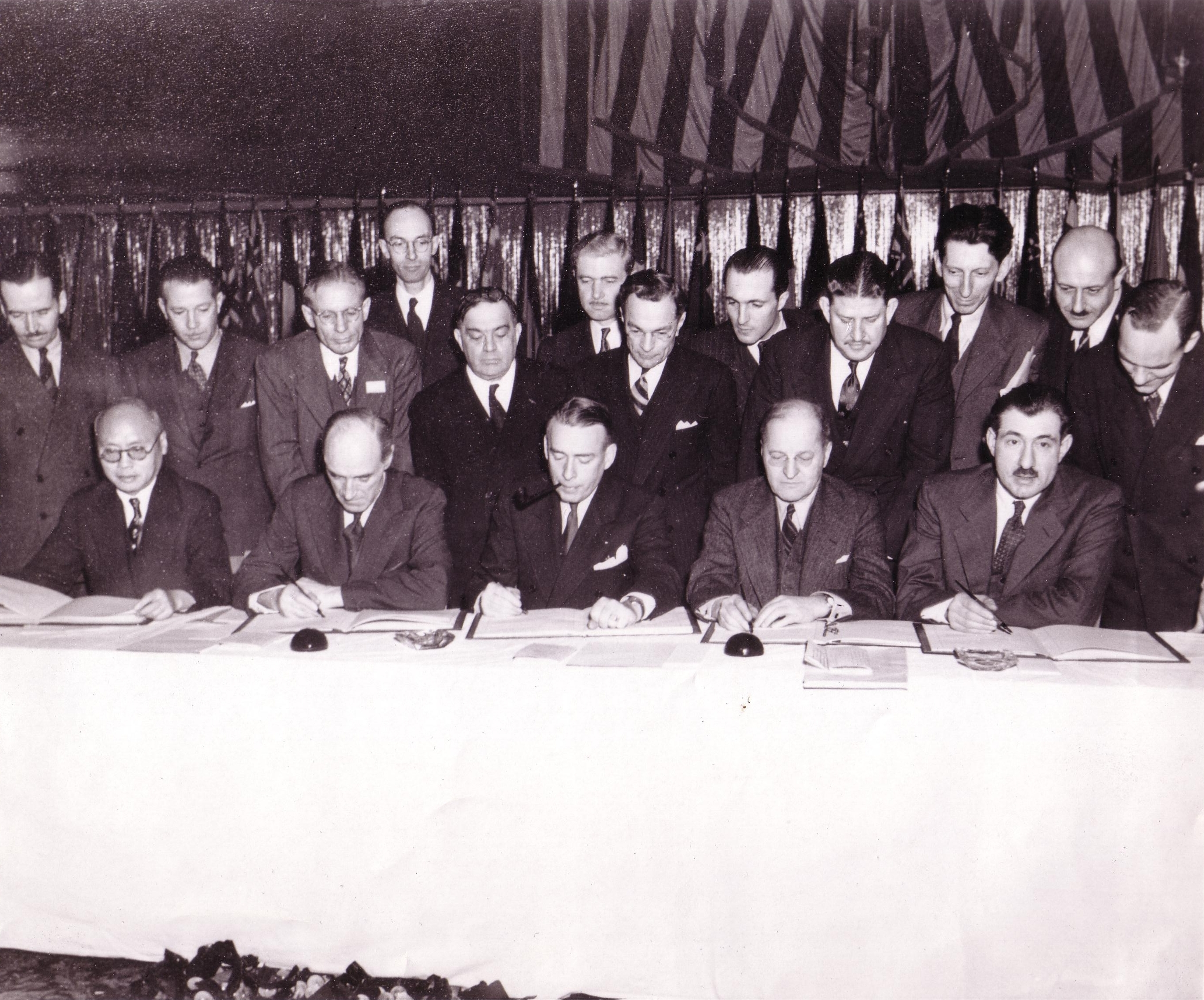
- Signature of the Chicago Convention
- Signed: 7 December 1944
- Location: Chicago, Illinois, United States
- Effective: 4 April 1947
- Condition: 26 ratifications
- Parties: 193 (Cook Islands and all United Nations members except Liechtenstein)
- Depositary: Government of the United States of America
- Languages: English, French, Russian and Spanish

The Convention on International Civil Aviation, also known as the Chicago Convention, established the International Civil Aviation Organization (ICAO), a specialized agency of the United Nations (UN) charged with coordinating international air travel. The convention establishes rules of airspace, aircraft registration, and safety, security, and sustainability, and details the rights of the signatories in relation to air travel. The convention also contains provisions pertaining to taxation.

The document was signed on December 7, 1944, in Chicago by 52 signatory states. It received the requisite 26th ratification on March 5, 1947, and went into effect on April 4, 1947, the same date that ICAO came into being. In October of the same year, ICAO became a specialized agency of the United Nations Economic and Social Council (ECOSOC). The convention has since been revised eight times (in 1959, 1963, 1969, 1975, 1980, 1997, 2000, and 2006).

As of March 2019, the Chicago Convention had 193 state parties, which includes all member states of the UN except Liechtenstein. The Cook Islands is a party to the Convention although it is not a member of the UN. The convention has been extended to cover Liechtenstein by the ratification of Switzerland.

== Main articles ==
Some important articles are:

Article 1: Every state has complete and exclusive sovereignty over airspace above its territory.

Article 3 bis: Every other state must refrain from resorting to the use of weapons against civil aircraft in flight.

Article 5: The aircraft of states, other than scheduled international air services, have the right to make flights across state's territories and to make stops without obtaining prior permission. However, the state may require the aircraft to make a landing.

Article 6: (Scheduled air services) No scheduled international air service may be operated over or into the territory of a contracting State, except with the special permission or other authorization of that State.

Article 10: (Landing at customs airports): The state can require that landing to be at a designated customs airport and similarly departure from the territory can be required to be from a designated customs airport.

Article 12: Each state shall keep its own rules of the air as uniform as possible with those established under the convention, the duty to ensure compliance with these rules rests with the contracting state.

Article 13: (Entry and Clearance Regulations) A state's laws and regulations regarding the admission and departure of passengers, crew or cargo from aircraft shall be complied with on arrival, upon departure and whilst within the territory of that state.

Article 16: The authorities of each state shall have the right to search the aircraft of other states on landing or departure, without unreasonable delay.

Article 24: Aircraft on a flight to, from, or across the territory of another contracting State shall be admitted temporarily free of duty, subject to the customs regulations of the State. Fuel, lubricating oils, spare parts, regular equipment and aircraft stores on board an aircraft of a contracting State, on arrival in the territory of another contracting State and retained on board on leaving the territory of that State shall be exempt from customs duty, inspection fees or similar national or local duties and charges. This exemption shall not apply to any quantities or articles unloaded, except in accordance with the customs regulations of the State, which may require that they shall be kept under customs supervision.

Article 29: Before an international flight, the pilot in command must ensure that the aircraft is airworthy, duly registered and that the relevant certificates are on board the aircraft. The required documents are:

Certificate of registration
Certificate of airworthiness
Passenger names, place of boarding and destination
Crew licenses
Journey Logbook
Radio Licence
Cargo manifest

Article 30: The aircraft of a state flying in or over the territory of another state shall only carry radios licensed and used in accordance with the regulations of the state in which the aircraft is registered. The radios may only be used by members of the flight crew suitably licensed by the state in which the aircraft is registered.

Article 32: The pilot and crew of every aircraft engaged in international aviation must have certificates of competency and licensees issued or validated by the state in which the aircraft is registered.

Article 33: (Recognition of Certificates and Licences) Certificates of airworthiness, certificates of competency and licensees issued or validated by the state in which the aircraft is registered, shall be recognized as valid by other states. The requirements for the issuing of those certificates or airworthiness, certificates of competency or licensees must be equal to or above the minimum standards established by the convention.

Article 40: No aircraft or personnel with endorsed licenses or certificate will engage in international navigation except with the permission of the state or states whose territory is entered. Any license holder who does not satisfy international standard relating to that license or certificate shall have attached to or endorsed on that license information regarding the particulars in which he does not satisfy those standards.

== Annexes ==
The convention is supported by nineteen annexes containing standards and recommended practices (SARPs). The annexes are amended regularly by ICAO and are as follows:

- Annex 1 – Personnel Licensing

Licensing of flight crews, air traffic controllers & aircraft maintenance personnel. Including Chapter 6 containing medical standards.

- Annex 2 – Rules of the Air
  - Appendix 1 - Signals
  - Appendix 2 - Interception of civil aircraft
  - Appendix 3 - Tables of cruising levels
  - Appendix 4 - Unmanned free balloons
  - ATTACHMENT A. Interception of civil aircraft
  - ATTACHMENT B. Unlawful interference
- Annex 3 – Meteorological Service for International Air Navigation
  - Vol I – Core SARPs
  - Vol II – Appendices and Attachments
- Annex 4 – Aeronautical Charts
- Annex 5 – Units of Measurement to be used in Air and Ground Operations
- Annex 6 – Operation of Aircraft
  - Part I – International Commercial Air Transport – Aeroplanes
  - Part II – International General Aviation – Aeroplanes
  - Part III – International Operations – Helicopters
- Annex 7 – Aircraft Nationality and Registration Marks
- Annex 8 – Airworthiness of Aircraft
- Annex 9 – Facilitation
- Annex 10 – Aeronautical Telecommunications
  - Vol I – Radio Navigation Aids
  - Vol II – Communication Procedures including those with PANS status
  - Vol III – Communication Systems

Part I – Digital Data Communication Systems
Part II – Voice Communication Systems

  - Vol IV – Surveillance Radar and Collision Avoidance Systems
  - Vol V – Aeronautical Radio Frequency Spectrum Utilization
- Annex 11 – Air Traffic Services – Air Traffic Control Service, Flight Information Service and Alerting Service
- Annex 12 – Search and Rescue
- Annex 13 – Aircraft Accident and Incident Investigation
- Annex 14 – Aerodromes
  - Vol I – Aerodrome Design and Operations
  - Vol II – Heliports
- Annex 15 – Aeronautical Information Services, like NOTAMs
- Annex 16 – Environmental Protection
  - Vol I – Aircraft Noise
  - Vol II – Aircraft Engine Emissions
  - Vol III – CO_{2} Certification Requirement
  - Vol IV – Carbon Offsetting and Reduction Scheme for International Aviation (CORSIA)
- Annex 17 – Security: Safeguarding International Civil Aviation Against Acts of Unlawful Interference
- Annex 18 – The Safe Transport of Dangerous Goods by Air
- Annex 19 – Safety Management (Since 14 November 2013)

Annex 5, Units of Measurement to be Used in Air and Ground Operations, named in its Table 3-3 three "non-SI alternative units permitted for temporary use with the SI": the foot (for vertical distance = altitude), the knot (for speed), and the nautical mile (for long distance).

== Kerosene tax ==
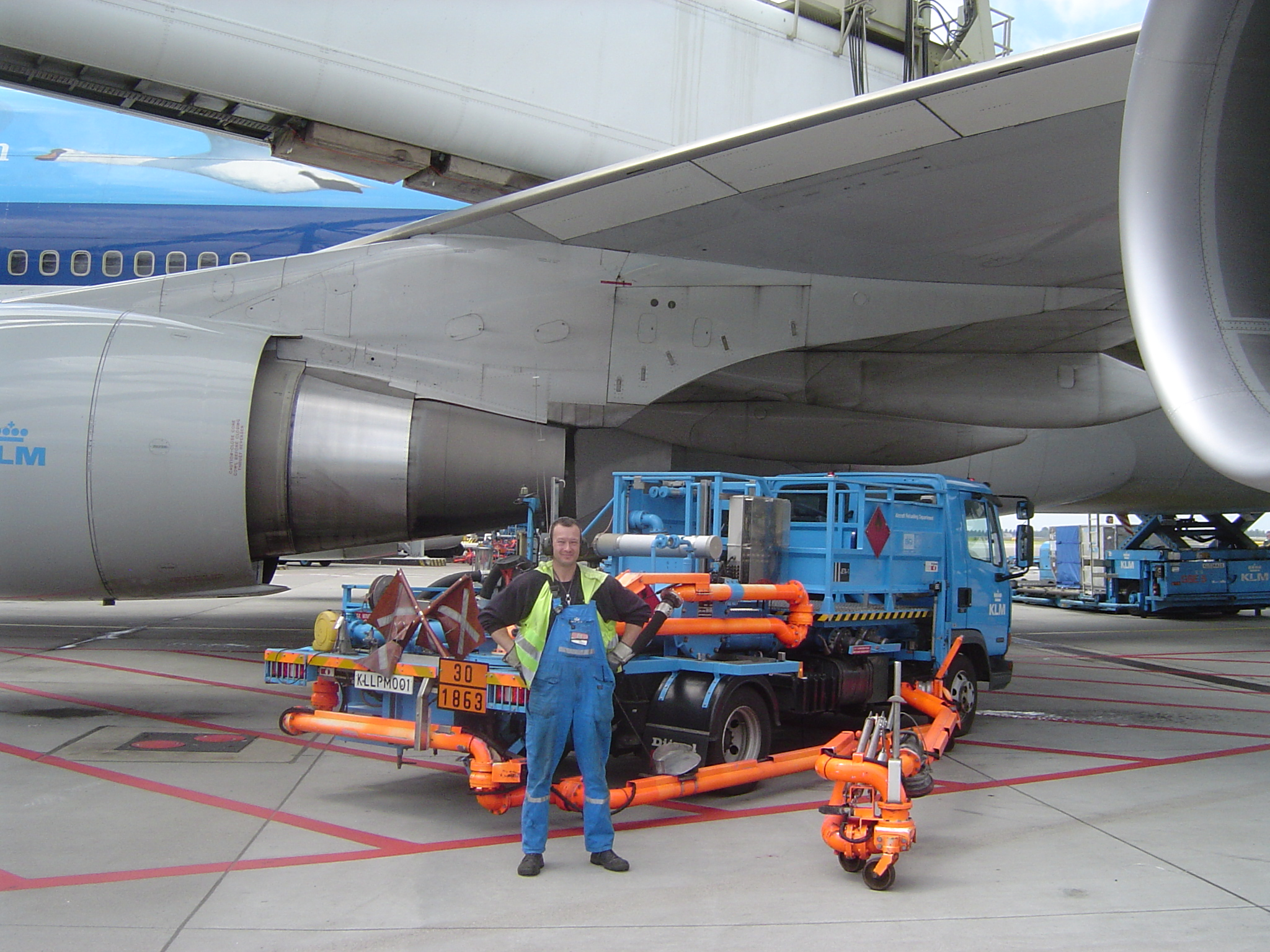
Tank truck at Schiphol Airport. Refuelling can be taxed throughout the EU.

Article 24 of the Chicago Convention stipulates that when flying from one contracting state to another, the kerosene that is already on board aircraft may not be taxed by the state where the aircraft lands, nor by a state through whose airspace the aircraft has flown. This was intended to prevent double taxation. However, there is no tax regulation in the Chicago Convention to refuelling the aircraft before departure.

The Chicago Convention does not preclude a kerosene tax on domestic flights and on refueling before international flights. Although the ICAO has produced various policy documents suggesting that no taxes of any kind should be placed on aviation fuel, (Note: For example, a 1999 resolution of the ICAO Council stated: "fuel ... taken on board for consumption by an aircraft from a contracting state in the territory of another contracting State departing for the territory of any other State shall be exempt from all customs or other duties..." It broadly interpreted the scope of the Article 24 exemption to include "import, export, excise, sales, consumption and internal duties and taxes of all kinds levied upon... fuel". The stated reasons for these kerosene tax exemptions were: "[T]he imposition of national or local taxes on the acquisition of fuel... may have an adverse economic and competitive impact on international air transport operations. (...)". This resolution was not legally binding.) none of these are legally binding, and they are not found in the Chicago Convention itself.

Although there are numerous bilateral agreements, so-called 'air services agreements', which make more extensive agreements, including often tax exemption when refueling an aircraft that has come from another contracting state, these are independent from the Chicago Convention; moreover, some air services agreements do allow for the taxation of fuels.

== See also ==
- International Civil Aviation Day

== Bibliography ==
- Paul Michael Krämer, Chicago Convention, 50th Anniversary Conference, Chicago, October 31 – November 1, 1994. Zeitschrift für Luft und Weltraumrecht 1995, S. 57.
