= Lex Gold =

Scottish footballer and administrator

Lex Gold CBE (born 14 December 1940) is a Scottish administrator and former footballer who was a director of Caledonian MacBrayne as of 2012.

Gold was born in Lanark, and played professional football as a teenager, including an 18-month spell with Rangers. He was a civil servant for over thirty years.

Gold was chairman of Hibernian until he resigned after the club was relegated in 1998. In 1998, he was invited to deliver the Marlow (Scotland) Lecture to the Institution of Engineers and Shipbuilders in Scotland. Gold was also on the boards of NHS Lanarkshire, Scottish Enterprise, the Scottish Chamber of Commerce and the Confederation of British Industry in Scotland. Until October 2009 Gold was the executive chairman of the SPL.
