= International Civil Aviation Day =

International observance, 7 December

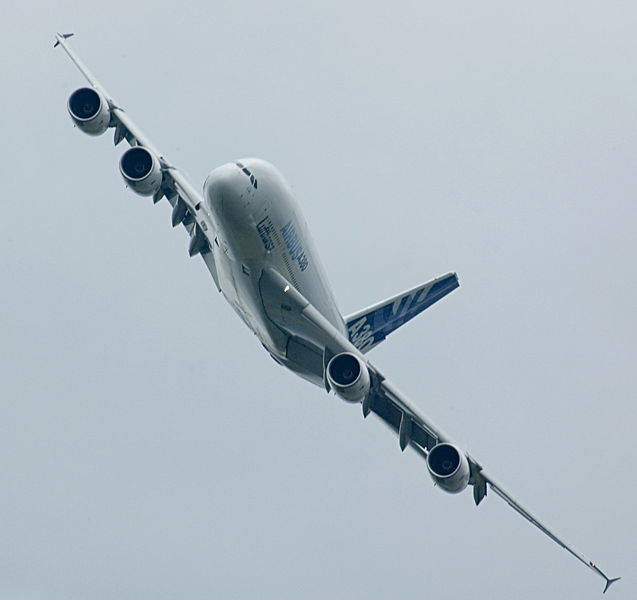
- An Airbus A380
- Observed by: All UN Member States
- Date: 7 December
- Next time: 7 December 2025
- Frequency: Annual
- First time: 1994; 31 years ago
- Started by: United Nations General Assembly

In 1996, the United Nations General Assembly proclaimed that 7 December was to be the International Civil Aviation Day.

The day has been celebrated by the International Civil Aviation Organization (ICAO) since 7 December 1994, the 50th anniversary of the signing the Convention on International Civil Aviation. The purpose of the day is to recognize the importance of aviation, especially international air travel, to the social and economic development of the world.
