= Harvard Radio Meteor Project =

The Harvard Radio Meteor Project is a scientific investigative station based within Harvard University.

The Harvard station is investigating data specifically upon the height, the deceleration (speeds) and the distribution of ionized material within the trail of meteors. The method involves a system of radar producing stations using data that has originated from the reflected pulse returning from the ion columns of meteors.

The antenna used at the Harvard station (main site) is described as a double-trough type antenna.
