= Libahunt =

1911 play by August Kitzberg

Libahunt (the Estonian name for a werewolf) is the name of a 1912 play (a tragedy) by August Kitzberg, and a 1968 film of the same name based on the play.

A triangular love story evolves in a peasant family in southwestern Estonian countryside around Halliste in the beginning of 1800s over a time span of 15 years.

== Synopsis ==
The play starts on a stormy winter night: the men of the family return from a compulsory church service, where a woman, accused of witchcraft, was whipped to death in front of the church. The characters describe their fears and prejudice. The first act ends with the young daughter of the dead woman, appearing alone and frozen from a snowstorm. She is being adopted into a family, which already has a son, Margus, 14 and one adopted girl, Mari, 8.

In the next 3 scenes, 10 years later, all three are adolescents at the age of confirmation. Margus is obviously in love with Tiina, who, with her dark hair, love to nature's creatures and defiance towards "being ordered around", represents the free spirit of idealistic Romanticism. In a bout of jealousy, Mari, blond and the embodiment of obedience to the church and their landlord, accuses Tiina of being a werewolf, first in private, then spreading the gossip, and finally in public. The insulted girl escapes into the forest and reappears only 4 days later. This makes the head of the family repeat the accusation, which results in the girl escaping again.

The play ends 5 more years later, when Margus and Mari are already married. In a snowstorm on his way back from the pub, Margus shoots a gun to scare away wolves. Arriving home they can hear wolves howling quite near to the house. Opening the door, he catches a collapsing Tiina, dying of the bullet-wound.

== Analysis ==
In folklore the werewolves represent the cycle of legends of essentially shamanistic content—a man turning into animal and reverse—that were modified by the xenophobic in-group/out-group hatred and the witch-hunt of the Baroque era church's inquisition, fighting against the loss of power after the scientific progress in Renaissance and the Enlightenment. The heroine Tiina has come to be known as a symbol of freedom.

== Musical ==
For the play's 100th anniversary, the Estonian State Puppet Theatre has turned it into a musical.
