= Zartosht No-Diso =

Day of remembrance in Zoroastrianism

Zartosht no-diso, or Zarthost no deeso, is an important day of remembrance in the Zoroastrian religion. It is a commemoration of the death anniversary of the prophet Zoroaster. It is observed on the 11th day (Khorshed) of the 10th month (Dae). In the seasonal calendar, Zarthost No-Diso falls on May 22, 2026.

It is an occasion of remembrance with lectures and discussions held on the life and works of the prophet. Attendance at the fire temple is very high during this occasion. A much higher number of mobeds are brought to pray at the Atash Behrams and Atash Adarans. There is no mourning in the Zoroastrian religion, only remembrance and worship of the Farohars of the departed.

However, Zoroaster's death is not mentioned in the Avesta. Nonetheless, in the Shahnama 5.92, he is said to have been murdered at the altar by the Turanians in the storming of Balkh.
