= Christmas on Campus =

Annual event at the University of Dayton

Christmas on Campus is an annual event at the University of Dayton in which children are invited to campus to celebrate the Christmas holiday. It has become one of the nation's largest single-day, on-campus community service events. University students buddy up with area children and treat them to seasonal shows, displays and food. The event is held on December 8 each year, the same day as the Feast of the Immaculate Conception. It is one of the largest events hosted by the University of Dayton, and has a student organization devoted to preparing and running the event. It is considered by some to be an integral part of the campus' spirit.

== History ==
The roots of Christmas on Campus can be traced to 1962, when an event called Operation Joy was held in which 60 children between the ages of 4 and 12 were brought to campus as part of a Christmas party hosted by the senior class. In 1963, the first event referred to as Christmas on Campus was held. However, it was meant as a celebration for students before the beginning of Christmas break, and did not include inviting children. These two events were combined in 1966, when children were invited to attend Christmas on Campus. There were 275 children at the 1966 inauguration of the event in its current form.

On January 16, 2009, the founder of Christmas on Campus, Eleanor "Ellie" Ann Kurtz, died at age 82. Kurtz ran the event every year until 1994, and missed it only twice, including in 2008, due to poor health.

== Current event ==
In 2017, the event will be celebrating its 54th annual celebration. Work on the event is divided into eight committees, each with different duties to prepare for all aspects of the event. These committees, and their responsibilities, are:

- School Outreach Committee – Bringing children to the event; pairing Dayton students with children
- Community Outreach Committee – Raising money and planning events service and social activities within campus and the Dayton community
- Decorations Committee – Producing and placing ornamentation on campus; selecting and decorating a large Christmas tree
- Entertainment Committee – Hiring and coordinating professional acts; coordinating other student organizations to run events as part of Christmas on Campus
- Finance Committee – Responsible for all monetary transactions for the Christmas on Campus Committee
- Hospitality Committee – Coordinating invitations and thank-you letters; producing and selling Christmas on Campus T-shirts
- Publicity Relations Committee – Spreading the word about the event and planning kick-off day, held 30 days before the event; soliciting donations
- Transportation Committee – Monitoring children during travel to and from campus; uniting children with their adoptive students

== Christmas off Campus ==
Christmas off Campus is an alumni event created as an extension of the original Christmas on Campus. In 1990, through the work of Brian and Renai Lowry, the first Christmas off Campus was held by the University of Dayton's St. Louis alumni chapter. The event has now spread to many other chapters of the UD Alumni Association.

Many of the Christmas off Campus events emulate the experience of Christmas on Campus for the children involved. They also raise money for a variety of community organizations, such as the Ronald McDonald House Charities, the Covenant House, the Make-a-Wish Foundation and the Boys & Girls Clubs of America. Because of this work, Woman's Day magazine included Christmas off Campus as one of "31 fun activities to keep kids busy over the holidays" in 2004.
