= Population index =

Meteor shower parameter

The population index, or r-value, indicates the magnitude distribution of a meteor shower. Values below 2.5 correspond to distributions where bright meteors are more frequent than average, while values above 3.0 mean that the share of faint meteors is larger than usual. Population indices are not solely associated with meteor showers.
