= Alabama Day =

US State holiday

- Observed by: Alabama, United States
- Celebrations: 90
- Date: December 14
- Next time: December 14, 2026
- Frequency: annual

Alabama Day is a holiday celebrated on December 14. It commemorates Alabama's admission to the Union as the 22nd state on December 14, 1819. The Alabama Legislature adopted a resolution calling for the observance of the day in 1923, at the urging of the Alabama Department of Education and Alabama Department of Archives and History.
