= Vladimir-Georg Karassev-Orgusaar =

Estonian film director

Vladimir-Georg Karassev-Orgusaar (born Vladimir-Georg-Julian Orgusaar, from 1953 to 1976 Vladimir Karassev; 14 December 1931 – 27 January 2015) was an Estonian film director.

Georg Karassev-Orgusaar was born in Tallinn. He studied history and literature at the Tomsk University and cinematography at the Moscow All-Union State Institute of Cinematography. In the Estonian SSR, he produced a number of documentary films. His trilogy on Soviet history consists of films "Precursor" (Estonian: "Eelkäija", 1967) on Viktor Kingissepp, "Solstice" ("Pööripäev", 1968) on June 1940 'revolution' in Estonia, a central myth of Soviet mythology in Estonia, and "Commander" ("Väejuht", 1968) on August Kork, an Estonian Bolshevik military leader and victim of 1937 Stalinist purges. The trilogy covers those moments of Soviet history in an ostensibly pro-Soviet manner, but leaves possibilities for other interpretations (e.g. parallels with 1968 events in Czechoslovakia; juxtaposing August Kork and Joseph Stalin; the tragedy of Estonian revolutionaries etc.). Other documentaries by Vladimir-Georg Karassev-Orgusaar include "Forge" ("Sepikoda", 1974; in collaboration with Uno Maasikas), "New Era" ("Uus aeg", 1969) and "Hard Times" ("Rasked aastad", 1973).

His only feature film, "The Outlaws" ("Lindpriid"; based on Jaan Anvelt's unfinished novel) is sometimes considered as Karassev's masterpiece. The 4 hour film shows members of the Estonian Bolshevik underground acting in 1920s and feature innovative techniques. Communist authorities disapproved of the work and ordered the film tapes to be destroyed. However, copies did survive, and the film was first shown in 1989. Georg Karassev-Orgusaar himself had emigrated to France after he was banned from making movies in the USSR. In emigration, he worked as a publicist and film critic.

In 1990, Karassev-Orgusaar was elected to Estonian Congress. He was the founder of Association France–Estonie—Pont de la Démocratie and its co-president.

An Estonian documentary film by Peeter Brambat "LINDPRII - Vladimir-Georg Karasjov-Orgusaar" (An Outlaw) - with a preview on February 5, 2025 at the Docpoint Tallinn documentary film festival, at the Artis cinema - has been released about V.G. Karasjov-Orgusaar (1931-2015), the author of "Outlaws" (1971), a legendary film and a flagship of art-house cinema in the history of Estonian cinema.
