= First President's Day (Kazakhstan) =

Day of the First President of the Republic of Kazakhstan
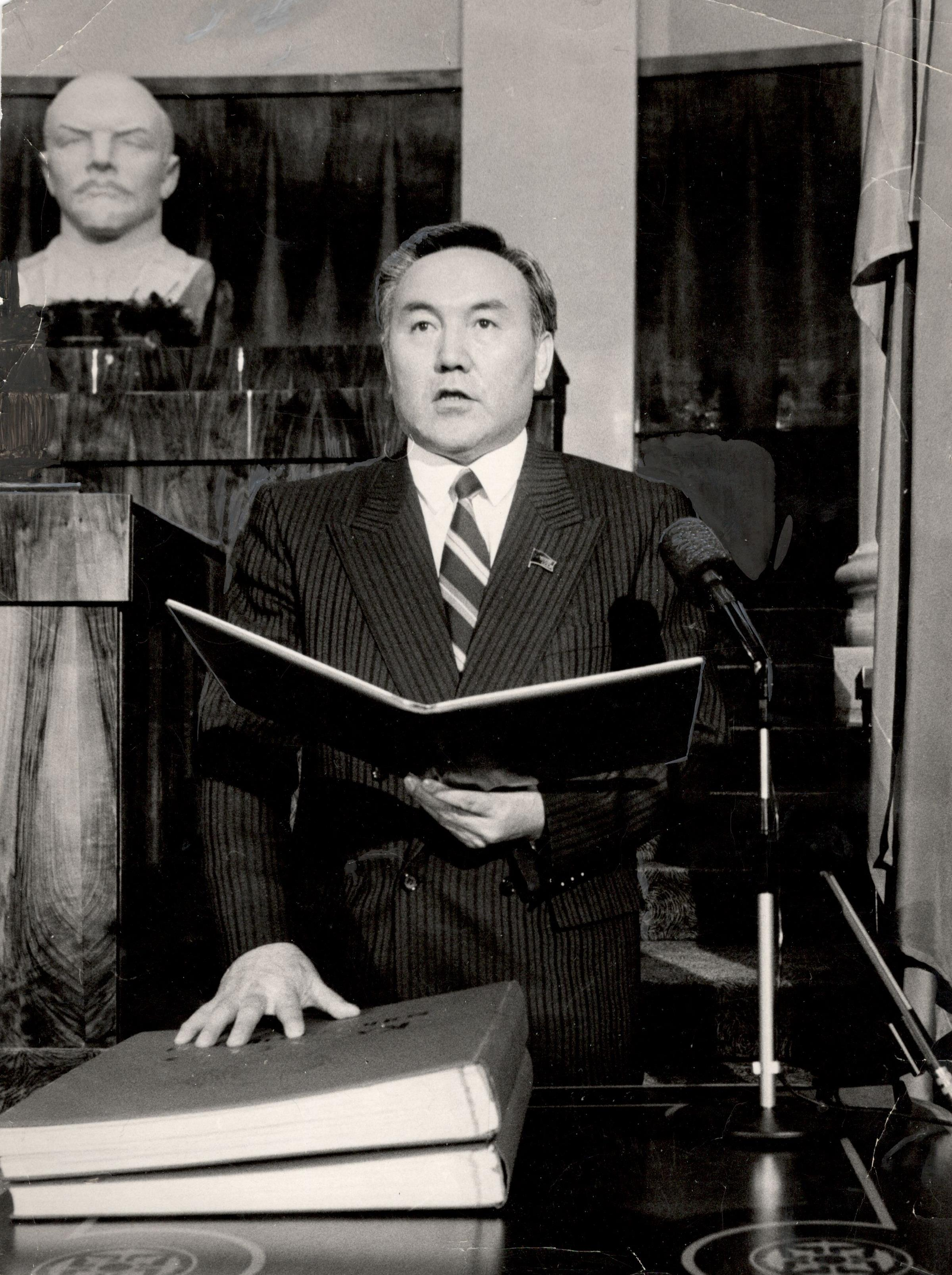
- Nursultan Nazarbayev taking the oath of office as the first President of Kazakhstan, December 1991
- Official name: Kazakh: Қазақстан Республикасының Тұңғыш Президенті күні Russian: День Первого Президента Республики Казахстан
- Also called: First President's Day
- Observed by: Kazakhstan
- Type: Commemorative
- Significance: Marks the 1991 election of Nursultan Nazarbayev as the first president of independent Kazakhstan
- Celebrations: Cultural events, exhibitions, official programs, wreath-laying ceremonies
- Observances: Schools and state institutions often hold educational activities on political history
- Date: 1 December
- Next time: 1 December 2026
- Frequency: Annual
- Related to: Nursultan Nazarbayev, Independence of Kazakhstan

First President's Day (Kazakh: Тұңғыш Президент күні, romanized: Tūñğyş Prezident künı; Russian: День Первого Президента, romanized: Den' Pervogo Prezidenta), officially Day of the First President of the Republic of Kazakhstan (Kazakh: Қазақстан Республикасының тұңғыш президенті күні, romanized: Qazaqstan Respublikasynyñ tūñğyş prezidentı künı; Russian: День Первого Президента Казахстана, romanized: Den' Pervogo Prezidenta Kazakhstana) is an annual commemorative day in Kazakhstan, observed on 1 December. The date marks the 1991 presidential election, in which Nursultan Nazarbayev was elected as the first president of independent Kazakhstan. The day was celebrated as a public holiday from 2012 until 2022, after which it was retained as a commemorative date but removed from the list of official holidays.

== History ==
The 1 December date is primarily associated with the 1991 presidential election, in which Nursultan Nazarbayev won 99% of the vote and became the first president of independent Kazakhstan during the dissolution of the Soviet Union.

On 10 December 2011, during a plenary session of the Senate of the Parliament of Kazakhstan, the Law "On Amendments to the Law of the Republic of Kazakhstan 'On Holidays in the Republic of Kazakhstan'" was adopted. The law was signed by Nazarbayev on 14 December and was assigned number 509-IV.

Since 2012, 1 December has been marked across Kazakhstan with cultural events, exhibitions, and official programs aimed at promoting peace and harmony. State institutions and schools often organized activities that highlighted the achievements of Nazarbayev and the political history of independence, while some years also include wreath-laying ceremonies and conferences. National initiatives have occasionally been timed to coincide with the holiday for example, in 2016, the National Bank of Kazakhstan issued a commemorative 10,000 tenge banknote, and the city of Nurkent in the Almaty Region was officially established.

Following the 2022 unrest and the reduction of Nazarbayev’s public role, On 7 September 2022 the Mäjilis of the Parliament of Kazakhstan proposed to continue observing 1 December as a commemorative day together with other important dates such as the Day of State Symbols and the Day of Gratitude while removing it from the list of public holidays. The law was adopted and subsequently signed by President Kassym-Jomart Tokayev on 29 September, and the commemorative observance began on 28 November 2022, although it is no longer a public day off holiday.

== Controversy ==
The holiday has been subject to varying opinions. Supporters note it as recognition of Kazakhstan's statehood and stability in the early years of independence. Critics have seen it as part of the cult of personality surrounding Nazarbayev.

== See also ==
- Public holidays in Kazakhstan
- Nursultan Nazarbayev
- 1991 Kazakh presidential election
