= Aeroflot Flight 593 =

1994 aviation accident in Russia

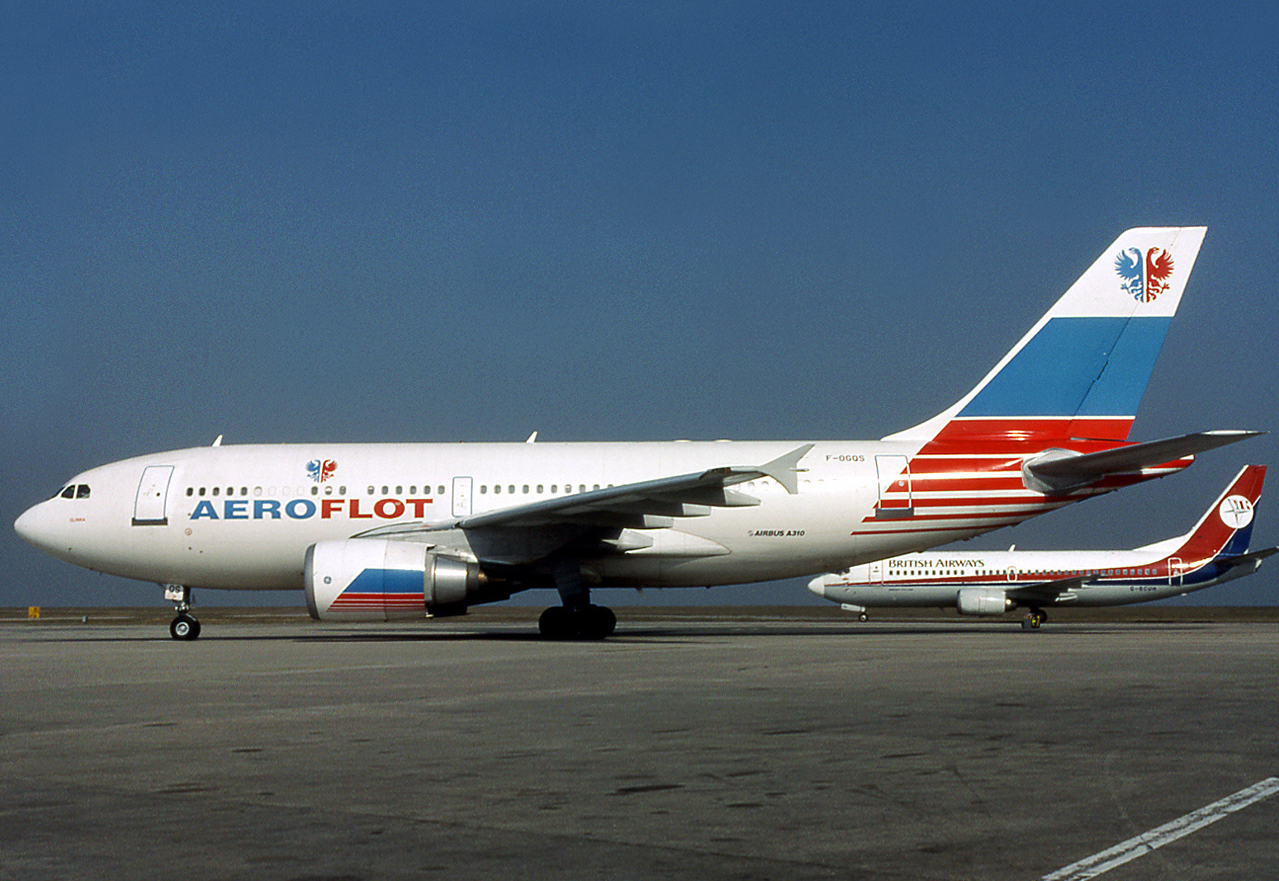
- F-OGQS, the aircraft involved in the accident, pictured in 1993

Accident
- Date: 23 March 1994
- Summary: Stall due to pilot error following deactivation of autopilot by non-pilot
- Site: 20 km (12 mi) E of Mezhdurechensk, Kemerovo Oblast, Russia; 53°30′N 88°15′E

Aircraft
- Aircraft type: Airbus A310-304
- Aircraft name: Glinka
- Operator: Aeroflot – Russian International Airlines
- IATA flight No.: SU593
- ICAO flight No.: AFL593
- Call sign: AEROFLOT 593
- Registration: F-OGQS
- Flight origin: Sheremetyevo International Airport, Moscow, Russia
- Destination: Kai Tak Airport, British Hong Kong
- Occupants: 75
- Passengers: 63
- Crew: 12
- Fatalities: 75
- Survivors: 0

Aeroflot Flight 593 was a scheduled international passenger flight from Sheremetyevo International Airport, Moscow, Russia, to Kai Tak Airport in Hong Kong. On 23 March 1994, the aircraft operating the route, an Airbus A310 flown by Aeroflot, crashed into the Kuznetsk Alatau mountain range in Kemerovo Oblast, killing all 63 passengers and 12 crew members on board.

The cockpit voice recorder revealed the presence of the relief captain's teenaged children in the cockpit at the time of the accident. While seated at the controls, the pilot's 15-year-old son had unknowingly partially disengaged the A310's autopilot control of the aircraft's ailerons. The autopilot then disengaged completely, causing the aircraft to roll into a steep bank and a near-vertical dive. Despite managing to level the aircraft, the first officer over-corrected when pulling up, causing the plane to stall and enter into a spin; the pilots managed to level the A310 once more, but the plane had descended beyond a safe altitude to initiate a recovery and subsequently crashed into the mountain range. All 75 occupants died on impact.

== Background ==
=== Aircraft ===
The aircraft involved in the accident was a leased Airbus A310-300, registration F-OGQS (France), operating for Russian International Airlines, an autonomous division of Aeroflot that was set up for serving routes to the Russian Far East and Southeast Asia. It was one of five operating for RAL. On average, the crew of three operating the aircraft had logged 900 hours on the type.

=== Passengers and crew ===
Of the 63 passengers on board, 38 were Russian nationals, including about 30 airline employees and family members. The remaining 23 foreigners were mostly businessmen from Hong Kong and Taiwan who were looking for economic opportunities in Russia. Another sizeable group were passengers from the United Kingdom.

The captain of Flight 593 was Andrey Viktorovich Danilov, (Note: Russian: Андрей Викторович Данилов) aged 40, who was hired by Aeroflot in November 1992. He had accrued over 9,500 hours of flight time, including 950 hours in the A310, of which 895 hours were as captain. Igor Vladimirovich Piskaryov, (Note: Russian: Игорь Владимирович Пискарёв) aged 33, was hired by Aeroflot in October 1993 and served as the first officer; he had 5,885 hours of flight time, including 440 hours in the A310. The relief captain was Yaroslav Vladimirovich Kudrinsky, (Note: Russian: Ярослав Владимирович Кудринский) aged 39, who was hired by Aeroflot in November 1992; he had over 8,940 flying hours, including 907 hours in the A310. Kudrinsky also had experience in the Yakovlev Yak-40, Antonov An-12 and Ilyushin Il-76. Nine flight attendants were on board the plane.

Nationalities of passengers and crew
Nationality	Passengers	Crew	Total
Russia	38	12	52
China	6	0	6
Hong Kong	6	0	6
Taiwan	5	0	5
United Kingdom	4	0	4
India	1	0	1
United States	1	0	1
Total	63	12	75

== Accident ==
Shortly after midnight on 23 March 1994, the aircraft was en route from Sheremetyevo International Airport in Moscow to Kai Tak Airport in Hong Kong, with 75 occupants aboard, of whom 63 were passengers. Kudrinsky was taking his two children on their first international flight, and they were brought to the cockpit while he was on duty. Five people were thus on the flight deck: Kudrinsky; co-pilot Piskaryov; Kudrinsky's son Eldar, (Note: Russian: Эльдар Кудринский) aged 16; his daughter Yana, (Note: Russian: Яна Кудринская) aged 13; and another pilot, Vladimir Makarov, (Note: Russian: Владимир Макаров) who was flying as a passenger.

With the autopilot active, Kudrinsky, against regulations, allowed his children to sit at the controls. Yana took the pilot's left front seat at 00:43. Kudrinsky adjusted the autopilot heading to give her the impression that she was turning the plane, though she actually had no control of the aircraft. Shortly thereafter, at 00:51, Eldar occupied the pilot's seat.

Just under four minutes later, Eldar had applied enough force to the control column to contradict the autopilot for 30 seconds, causing the flight computer to switch the plane's ailerons to manual control while maintaining control over the other flight systems. Eldar was now in partial control of the aircraft. A silent indicator light came on to alert the pilots to this partial disengagement. The pilots, who had previously flown Soviet-designed planes that had audible warning signals, apparently failed to notice the silent indicator light.

Eldar himself was the first to notice a problem, when he observed that the plane was banking right. Shortly after, the flight path indicator changed to show the new flight path of the aircraft as it turned. Since the turn was continuous, the resulting predicted flight path drawn on screen was a 180-degree turn. This indication is similar to those shown when in a holding pattern, where a 180-degree turn is required to remain in a stable position. This confused the pilots for nine seconds, during which time the plane banked past a 45-degree angle to almost 90 degrees, steeper than the A310's design allowed. As the A310 cannot turn this steeply while maintaining altitude, the plane started to descend quickly. The increased g-forces on the pilots and crew made regaining control extremely difficult.

The autopilot, which no longer controlled the ailerons, used its other controls to compensate, pitching the nose up and increasing thrust. As a result, the plane began to stall; the autopilot, unable to cope, disengaged completely. At the same time, the autopilot's display screen went blank. To recover from the stall, an automatic system lowered the nose and put the plane into a nosedive. The reduced g-forces enabled Kudrinsky to retake his seat. Piskaryov managed to pull out of the dive but over-corrected, putting the plane in an almost vertical ascent. This caused the plane to stall once again, causing it to enter a spin. During the spin, Kudrinsky managed to almost recover the plane but pulled back the yoke too aggressively, causing their speed to drop. A rudder input then sent the plane into a second spin, this time a flat spin. Although Kudrinsky and Piskaryov managed to regain control again and leveled out the wings, they did not know how far they had descended, and their altitude by then was too low to recover. The plane crashed at 00:58 in a flat attitude at high vertical speed, estimated at 70 m/s (140 kn; 160 mph; 250 km/h). Sixteen minutes elapsed between Kudrinsky's children first taking the pilot's seat and the aircraft crashing. All 75 occupants died on impact.

The A310 crashed with its landing gear up, and all passengers had been prepared for an emergency as they were strapped into their seats. No distress calls were made before the crash. It was later found that, despite the struggles of both pilots to save the aircraft, if they had simply let go of the yoke after the first spin, aerodynamic principles would have caused the plane to return to level flight, thus preventing the crash. There was no evidence of a technical failure in the plane.

The wreckage was located on a remote hillside in the Kuznetsk Alatau mountain chain, about 20 kilometres (12 mi) east of Mezhdurechensk, Kemerovo Oblast; the flight data recorders were found on the second day of searching. Families of Russian victims placed flowers on the crash site while families of Chinese and Taiwanese victims scattered pieces of paper with messages written on them around the area.

== Aftermath ==
Aeroflot originally denied that children were present in the cockpit during the accident, but eventually admitted it when the Moscow-based magazine Obozrevatel (Russian: Обозреватель, lit. 'Observer') published a transcript of the cockpit voice recording on the week of 28 September 1994. The Associated Press said, according to the transcript, "the Russian crew almost succeeded in saving the plane". The New York Times said: "A transcript of the tape printed in the magazine Obozrevatel shows that the Russian crew nearly managed to save the Airbus plane and the 75 people on board, but that it was hampered by the presence of children and its unfamiliarity with the foreign-made plane." The Times also stated that an analysis by an aviation expert published in Rossiiskiye Vesti (Russian: Российские вести, lit. 'Russian News') supported that analysis.

== In popular culture ==
The events of Flight 593 were featured in "Kid in the Cockpit", a third-season (2005) episode of the Canadian TV series Mayday (called Air Emergency and Air Disasters in the U.S. and Air Crash Investigation in the UK and elsewhere around the world). The flight was also included in a Mayday sixth-season (2007) Science of Disaster special titled "Who's Flying the Plane?" Michael Crichton's novel Airframe, published in 1996, draws on events from the accidents of Aeroflot 593 and China Eastern Airlines Flight 583.

== See also ==
- 1942 Aeroflot Tupolev ANT-20bis crash
- Aeroflot accidents and incidents
- Ivan Mashkivsky - The lead investigator
