= Airframe (novel) =

1996 novel by Michael Crichton

- First edition cover
- Author: Michael Crichton
- Cover artist: Chip Kidd
- Language: English
- Genre: Techno-thriller
- Publisher: Knopf
- Publication date: 1996
- Publication place: United States
- Media type: Print (Hardcover)
- Pages: 352
- ISBN: 0-679-44648-6
- OCLC: 35723547
- Dewey Decimal: 813/.54 21
- LC Class: PS3553.R48 A77 1996

Airframe is a novel by the American writer Michael Crichton, his eleventh under his own name and twenty-first overall, first published in 1996, in hardcover, by Knopf. As a paperback, Airframe was released in 1997 by Ballantine Books. The plot follows Casey Singleton, a quality assurance vice president at the fictional aerospace manufacturer Norton Aircraft, as she investigates an in-flight accident aboard a Norton-manufactured airliner that leaves three passengers dead and 56 injured.

Airframe remains one of Crichton's few novels not to be adapted to film. Crichton stated this was due to the great expense needed to make such a film.

== Plot summary ==
TransPacific Airlines Flight 545 experiences severe pitch oscillations over the Pacific Ocean, leading to dozens of injured passengers and several deaths. The plane, a Norton Aircraft N-22 widebody, has an excellent safety record, and the captain is highly skilled, making the possibility of human error seemingly unlikely. Casey Singleton, a vice-president in quality assurance at Norton, is assigned by COO John Marder to join the company's Incident Review Team (IRT) to investigate. The IRT has one week to identify the issue in order to prevent a major sale with China from falling apart over safety concerns.

Due to issues with the flight recorders, the IRT is forced to manually check each system of the aircraft. At first, all signs point to the plane's slats accidentally deploying mid-flight. Though other N-22s had exhibited similar slat errors in the past, Norton assumed the problem had been fixed. Their search uncovers a counterfeit part in the wing, but this would not have been enough to cause the accident on its own. Casey grows suspicious of Bob Richman, an arrogant Norton employee who has been assigned to assist her. Meanwhile, the factory union is concerned the China sale will offset the wing to China, threatening employees' jobs, and seeks to sabotage the deal.

An unrelated N-22 engine failure, and the release of passenger camera footage from Flight 545, draws heavy media attention. Jennifer Malone, a producer for the television magazine Newsline, is interested in reporting on the N-22's flaws and pursues the story; Marder asks Casey to conduct an interview. Later, Casey realizes the accident aircraft was equipped with a quick access recorder (QAR); the team did not know the plane was equipped with one because QARs are optional. Casey locates the QAR and pieces together the events that caused the accident. First, a counterfeit part caused a sensor in the plane's wing to malfunction, which produced an error message in the cockpit. This error message could be cleared by deploying and retracting the plane's slats. Although deploying the slats would change the shape of the wing, the autopilot could adjust without incident. However, the captain's son, a pilot who was not certified to fly the N-22, was at the controls at the time of the accident; he manually overcorrected, overriding the autopilot and sending the plane into a series of oscillations.

Casey realizes she cannot publicize this information. Publicly pinning the blame on a TransPacific employee would sour relations with the airline, ruining future sales just as surely as any N-22 safety issues would. During her interview, she also discovers Richman has set her up to fail as part of a larger conspiracy. Richman and Marder had secretly prepared a larger sale to a South Korean airline, which included offsetting the wing. They hoped to use the accident to sink the China deal and oust CEO Harold Edgarton, confident that the accident would not jeopardize the Korean deal.

Casey thwarts the plan by allowing Malone onto a test flight for the N-22 from the accident, where the event is replicated, showing that a slat deployment alone would not cause the accident. Once Malone is shown the evidence, she cannot air her segment as planned without opening herself up to a defamation lawsuit. She is also unable to report the true story, since her boss thinks it is not exciting enough to hold people's attention. With the N-22's reputation cleared, the China deal proceeds, with the tail rather than the wing as an offset. Afterwards, Edgarton promotes Casey to head the company's Media Relations Division. Richman is arrested in Singapore for narcotics possession, while Marder leaves the company, supposedly on good terms. Malone leaves Newsline after a "contract dispute", and joins the staff of Hard Copy.

== Major characters ==
- Casey Singleton – The protagonist and a vice-president; Serves as a Quality Assurance representative on the company's Incident Review Team (IRT).
- John Marder – Chief Operating Officer at the Norton Plant in Burbank, California; Also oversaw the production project for the N-22 widebody that was involved in the incident.
- Jennifer Malone – Producer for Newsline that investigates the incident in order to create a televised segment against the N-22.

== Minor characters ==
- Doug Doherty – An engineer who is the structure and mechanical expert on the IRT.
- Nguyen Van Trung – Avionics expert on the Incident Review Team, overseeing the operation of the autopilot.
- Ken Burne – Power plant expert on the IRT.
- Ron Smith – Electrical expert on the IRT.
- Mike Lee – Carrier representative for TransPacific Airlines to Norton Aircraft.
- Barbara Ross – IRT secretary
- Norma – Casey Singleton's secretary who has been with the company for many years and knows its history.
- Bob Richman – Casey Singleton's recently appointed assistant; a relative in the Norton family tree working his way through the corporate divisions.
- Harold Edgarton – President of Norton Aircraft.
- Ted Rawley – A test pilot for Norton Aircraft who has an occasional romantic relationship with Singleton.
- Dick Shenk – Segment organizer for the fictional TV program Newsline, based in New York City.
- Marty Reardon – "On-talent" interviewer for Newsline
- Frederick Barker – A former FAA employee and severe critic of the N-22 aircraft.

== Major themes ==
Air safety procedures are a central theme in the novel. In illustrating the redundancies and safety measures necessary for every step of the airplane construction process as well as condemning the death of other publicly maligned aircraft such as the DC-10, Crichton challenges public perception of air safety, highlighting how the blame for accidents is often directed at the wrong party.

Another central theme, which compounds the issue mentioned above, is investigative journalism, and the consequences when sensational media agencies distort the truth to produce a better-selling story. The TV journalism subplot was singled out for praise in some reviews; Entertainment Weekly lauded it as "brutal and fresh and very funny" satire. The San Francisco Chronicle calls his portrayal of TV journalists believable, noting that Crichton "doesn't mind making enemies."

Airframe also continues the theme of human failure in human-machine interaction that is present across Crichton's other works. Despite malfunctions due to improper maintenance, the plane itself was functional; the incident was a result of human error by an insufficiently trained pilot.

== References to real events ==
In Airframe, as in most of his novels, Crichton uses the literary device of false documents, presenting numerous technical documents to create a sense of authenticity. He also takes great pains to be as accurate as possible in the novel's technical details. When the characters discuss how unfavorable media coverage can be the undoing of a perfectly good aircraft, his account of the American Airlines Flight 191 crash and its causes are consistent with the known facts at the time the novel was written.

In an interview with the Los Angeles Times, Crichton said that he drew upon the National Transportation Safety Board's aircraft accident report archives during his writing process, calling them "an unbelievable trove." As a result, the N-22 accident described in the novel resembles two real-life cases:

- The violent oscillations, the issue with the flap/slat handle becoming dislodged, and the importance of pilot training in order to respond properly to the characteristics of a specific aircraft type are closely modeled on the 1993 accident aboard China Eastern Airlines Flight 583.
- A pilot allowing his son to sit at the controls was also the cause of the 1994 Aeroflot Flight 593 crash. As in the novel, the son inadvertently disabled their aircraft's autopilot, and the accident could have been averted by re-engaging it. However, while the son in Airframe is a pilot, the 15-year-old son on Flight 593 was not. Also unlike the novel, the Aeroflot crew did not manage to recover from their overcorrection and crashed, killing all 75 passengers and crew.

== Reception ==
Airframe received generally positive reviews. In her San Francisco Chronicle review, Patricia Holt called it "classic Crichton," adding that readers will be "surprised, satisfied and even a bit better informed at the end." The New York Times' Christopher Lehmann-Haupt said of the novel: "By playing hide and seek with his plot, Mr. Crichton writes as if he were an engineer and his readers were all outsiders. Yet at the same time, he has taken on a complex subject in Airframe and made its subtleties dramatically vivid." Tom De Haven of Entertainment Weekly praised Crichton's research, saying: "I bet Michael Crichton was a kid who did his homework every night — and not only did it, but triple-checked it, made sure there were no smudges on the paper, then presented it to the teacher between card-stock covers secured with shiny brass fasteners." The Boston Globe's Nancy Harris commended Crichton on his ability to simplify the technical intricacies of aviation, calling Airframe a "very readable book."

Reviews tempered their praise with criticism of Crichton's writing style. De Haven took issue with the novel's use of genre clichés and "the clunkiest of plot gimmicks." Holt called it "formulaic but hard to put down" and described its characters as "cardboard." Lehmann-Haupt went even further, saying: "When you finish the novel and ask yourself why you end up feeling both entertained and frustrated, you are forced to reflect that a writer clever enough to bring such material to life ought to have been able to tell his story without playing manipulative games with the reader."

Though the central accident in Airframe primarily resembles China Eastern Airlines Flight 583 and Aeroflot Flight 593, Mark Lawson of The Guardian accused Crichton and his publishers of trying to capitalize on a different airplane disaster. Lawson notes that the novel was "loaded into airport bookstores shortly after the TWA 800 flight went down in the Atlantic," adding: "Crichton's profile as a writer depends on ... extreme topicality."

== Adaptation ==
An adaptation of Airframe, alongside an adaptation of Eaters of the Dead, was in development in the 1990s with Crichton and John McTiernan producing both, and writer William Wisher Jr. penning the screenplay adaptation.

== See also ==
- Accident analysis
- List of accidents and incidents involving commercial aircraft
- Flight test
- Failure analysis
- Air route authority between the United States and China
- Product liability
