= Tupolev ANT-16 =

Type of aircraft

ANT-16 (TB-4)

General information
- Type: Heavy bomber
- National origin: Soviet Union
- Manufacturer: Tupolev
- Status: Retired
- Primary user: Soviet Union
- Number built: 1

History
- First flight: 3 July 1933
- Developed from: Tupolev TB-3
- Variant: ANT-20

The Tupolev ANT-16 (also known as the TB-4; Russian: Тяжелый Бомбардировщик – Heavy Bomber) was an experimental heavy bomber aircraft designed and tested in the Soviet Union in the early 1930s.

== Design and development ==
Conceptually representing evolution of the TB-3 bomber, the ANT-16 was designed under the doctrine that size and payload were more important for a bomber than speed because it would be able to protect itself with defensive armament. The twin 5 by 1.8 by 1.8 metres (16.4 ft × 5.9 ft × 5.9 ft) bomb bays were the largest in the world at that time and presented many design challenges in order to preserve structural rigidity of the airframe.

The sole prototype first flew on 3 July 1933 with M. M. Gromov at the controls. The test flight program was completed by 29 September 1933 with disappointing results. The two top-mounted engines performed poorly and a significant portion of thrust generated by the wing-mounted engines was absorbed by the two meter-thick (6 ft 7 in) wing. A proposal to re-equip the aircraft with Mikulin AM-35 engines of 933 kW (1,250 hp) was not implemented. A second prototype was under construction, but was never finished (construction stopped 2 July 1933); some of its parts were used in the ANT-20.

== Specifications (ANT-16) ==

Data from The Osprey Encyclopedia of Russian Aircraft 1875-1995

General characteristics

- Crew: 12
- Length: 32 m (105 ft 0 in)
- Wingspan: 54 m (177 ft 2 in)
- Height: 17.3 m (56 ft 9 in)
- Wing area: 422 m^{2} (4,540 sq ft)
- Empty weight: 21,400 kg (47,179 lb)
- Gross weight: 33,280 kg (73,370 lb)
- Fuel capacity: 4,950 kg (10,913 lb) (~7,000 L (1,800 US gal; 1,500 imp gal) at 0.7 s.g.)
- Powerplant: 6 × Mikulin AM-34 V-12 liquid-cooled piston engines, 560 kW (750 hp) each
- Propellers: 2-bladed fixed-pitch propellers

Performance

- Maximum speed: 200 km/h (120 mph, 110 kn) at sea level

188 km/h (117 mph; 102 kn) at 5,000 m (16,000 ft)

- Cruise speed: 159 km/h (99 mph, 86 kn)
- Landing speed: 105 km/h (65 mph; 57 kn)
- Range: 1,000 km (620 mi, 540 nmi)
- Combat range: 940 km (580 mi, 510 nmi) with 8,000 kg (17,637 lb) bomb-load

2,000 km (1,200 mi; 1,100 nmi) with 2,000 kg (4,409 lb) bomb-load

- Service ceiling: 2,750 m (9,020 ft)
- Time to altitude: 1,000 m (3,300 ft) in 12 minutes 24 seconds

2,000 m (6,600 ft) in 34 minutes

- Wing loading: 79 kg/m^{2} (16 lb/sq ft)
- Power/mass: 0.101 kW/kg (0.061 hp/lb)
- Take-off run: 800 m (2,600 ft) in 36 seconds
- Landing run: 400 m (1,300 ft)

Armament

- Guns: 4x20mm cannon, 10x2 7.62mm DA machine guns
- Bombs: Up to 4,000 kg of bombs

== See also ==
Related development

- TB-3
- ANT-20
