= Vasily Kuptsov =

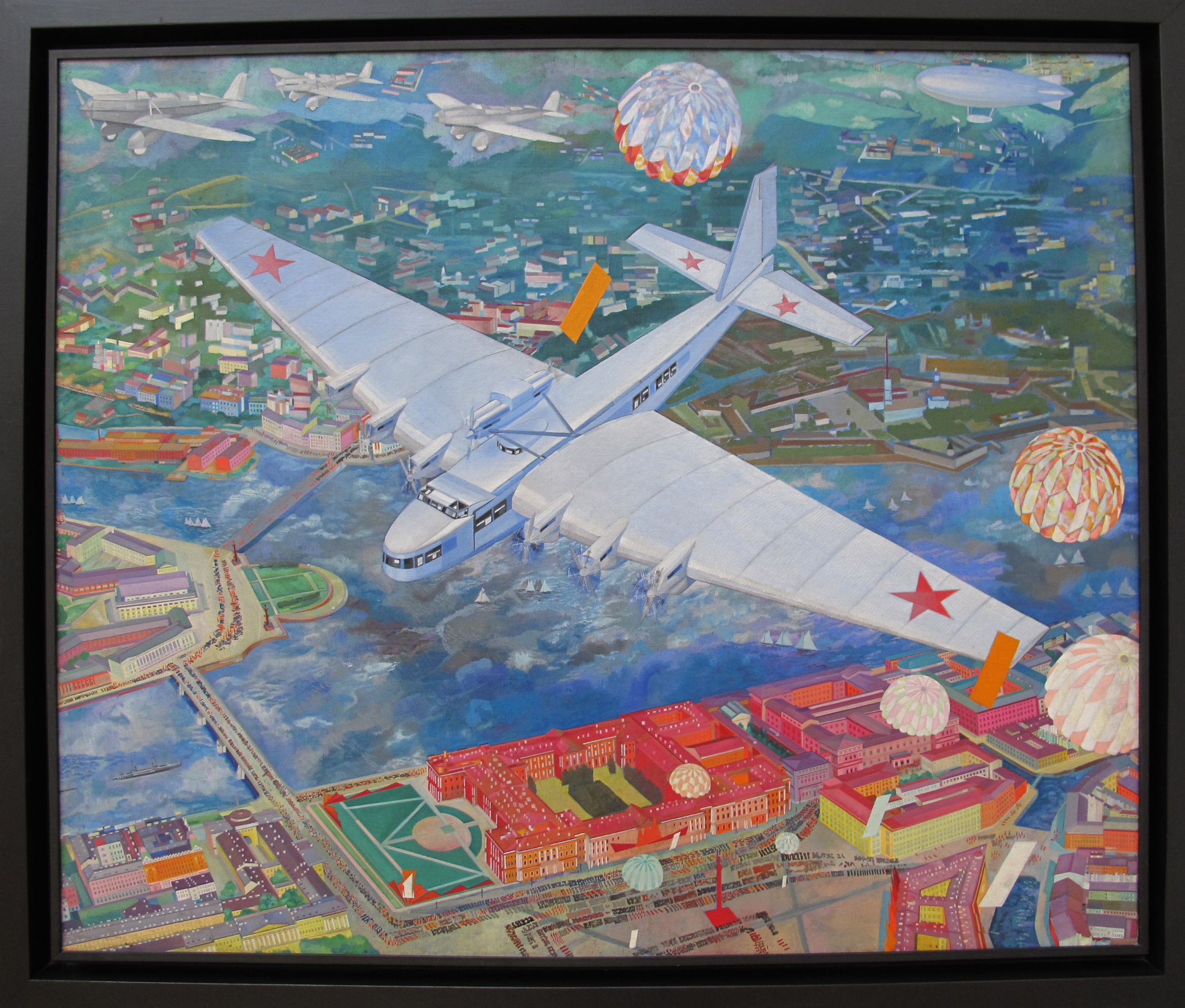
Vasily Kuptsov, Maxim Gorky ANT-20 (1934), Russian Museum, St. Petersburg

Vasily Vasilyevich Kuptsov (Russian: Василий Васильевич Купцов; 1899–1935) was a Russian painter. He is known for his 1934 work Maxim Gorky ANT-20, which depicts a Tupolev ANT-20 in flight.
