= Tupolev ANT-20 =

1930s Soviet large eight-engine aircraft

Coordinates: 55.8051°N 37.5153°E

ANT-20
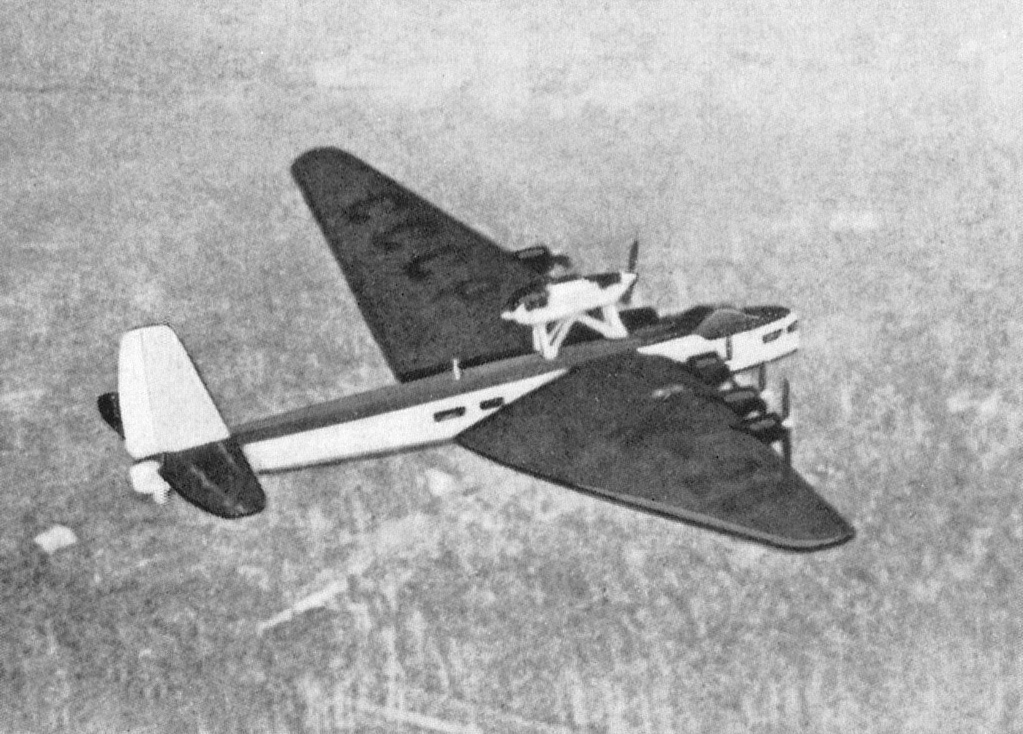
- ANT-20 "Maxim Gorky"

General information
- Type: Propaganda aircraft/Transport
- National origin: Soviet Union
- Manufacturer: Tupolev
- Primary user: Soviet Union
- Number built: 2

History
- Introduction date: 1934
- First flight: 19 May 1934
- Retired: 1942
- Developed from: Tupolev ANT-16

The Tupolev ANT-20 Maxim Gorky (Russian: Туполев АНТ-20 "Максим Горький", sometimes romanized as Maksim Gorki) was a Soviet eight-engine aircraft, the largest in the world during the 1930s. Its wingspan was similar to that of a modern Boeing 747, and was not exceeded until the 64.6-metre (212 ft) wingspan Douglas XB-19 heavy bomber prototype first flew in 1941.

== Overview ==
The ANT-20 was designed by Andrei Tupolev, using German engineer Hugo Junkers' original all-metal aircraft design techniques from 1918. It was constructed between 4 July 1933 and 3 April 1934, and was one of two aircraft of its kind built by the Soviets. The aircraft was named after Maxim Gorky and dedicated to the 40th anniversary of his literary and public activities. The ANT-20 was the largest known aircraft to have used the Junkers aviation firm's design philosophy of corrugated sheet metal for many of the airframe's key components, especially the corrugated sheet metal skinning of the airframe.

The Maxim Gorky was meant as the flagship of the Maxim Gorky propaganda squadron — Maxim Gorky Agiteskadril — which flew around the Soviet Union promoting the aims and achievements of Soviet Communism. For this purpose, it was equipped with a powerful radio set known as the "Voice from the sky" (Russian: Голос с неба, romanized: Golos s neba), printing machinery, a library, radio broadcasting equipment, a photographic laboratory and a film projector with sound for showing films in flight. In a first in aviation the aircraft was equipped with a ladder which would fold on itself to become part of the floor.

The aircraft was the first to use both direct current and alternating current. The aircraft could be dismantled and transported by rail if needed. The aircraft set several carrying-capacity world records and is also the subject of a 1934 painting by Vasily Kuptsov, which is now in the collection of the Russian Museum at Saint Petersburg.

== 1935 Maxim Gorky crash ==
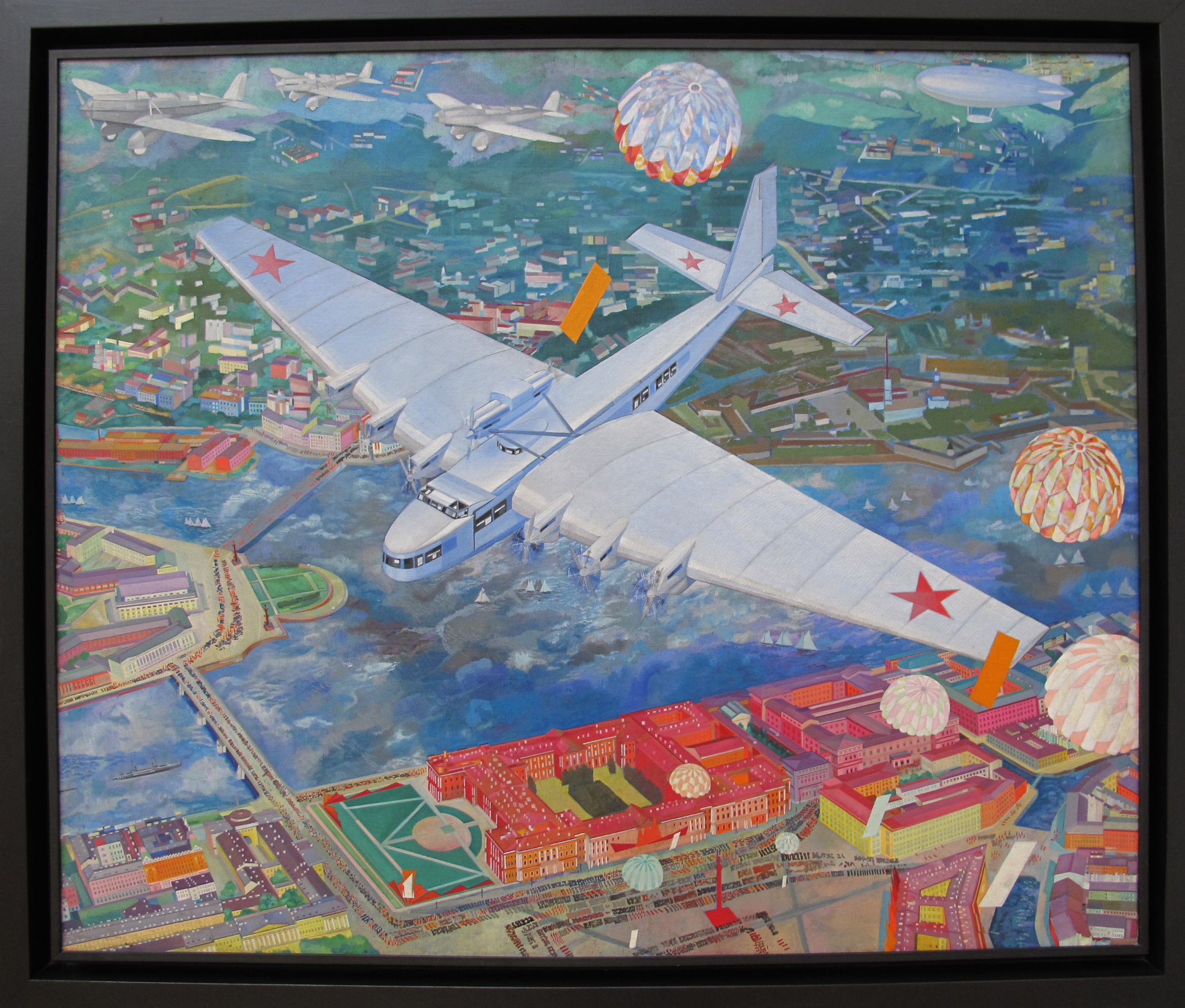
Vasily Kuptsov, Maxim Gorky ANT-20 (1934), Russian Museum, St. Petersburg.

On 18 May 1935, the Maxim Gorky (with pilots I. V. Mikheyev and I. S. Zhurov) and three more aircraft (a Tupolev ANT-14, R-5 and I-5) took off for a demonstration flight over Moscow. The main purpose of the other three aircraft flying so close was to make evident the difference in size. The accompanying I-5 biplane piloted by Nikolai Blagin had performed two loop manoeuvres around the Maxim Gorky. On the third loop, they collided. The Maxim Gorky crashed into a low-rise residential neighbourhood west of present-day Sokol metro station. Forty-five people were killed in the crash, including the fighter pilot as well as both crew members and the 33 passengers on the Maxim Gorky, and an additional nine people on the ground.

== ANT-20bis ==
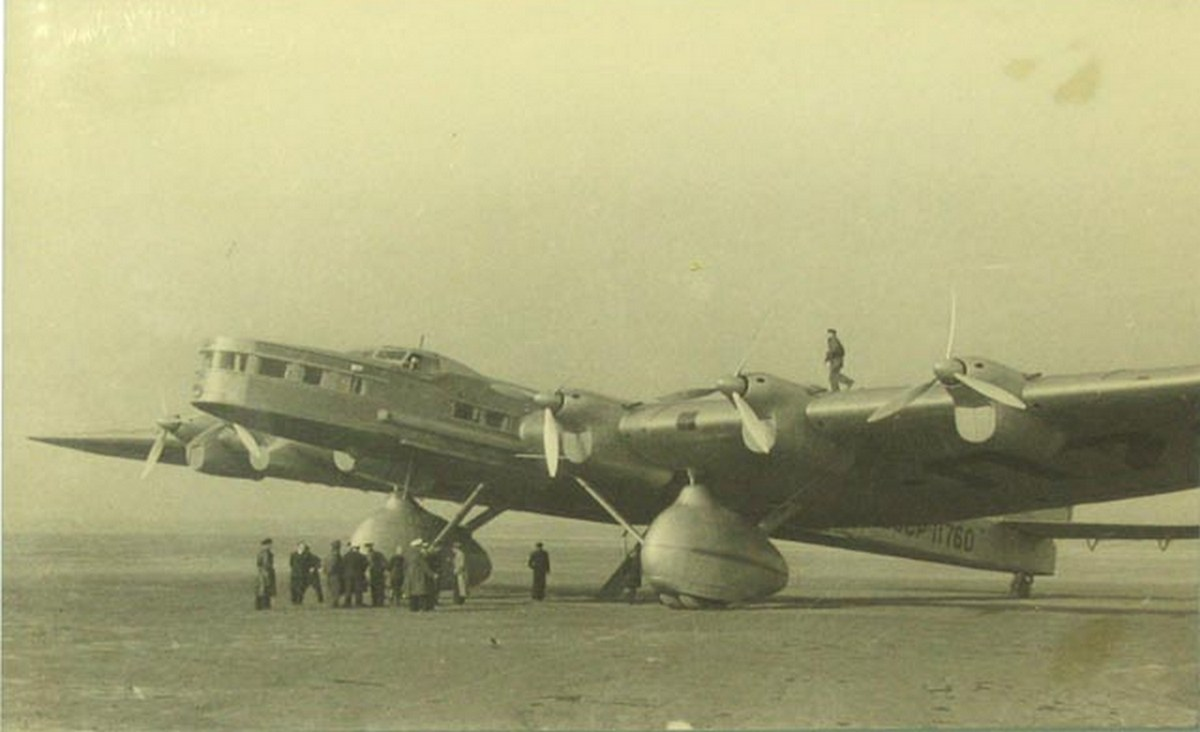
Aeroflot's ANT-20bis

A replacement aircraft, the ANT-20bis (also designated PS-124 or Passazhirsky Samolyot 124, so named as it was built at Plant No. 124), had begun production the following year and first flew in 1938 (other sources mention 15 May 1939 as the date of the first flight). It was largely identical in design but with six more-powerful Mikulin AM-34FRNV engines. On 12 August 1939 it was sold to Aeroflot and served their transport routes in Russia and Uzbekistan. In December 1940, the aircraft was re-engined with two slightly more powerful Mikulin AM-35 engines in the inner positions (numbers three and four). On 14 December 1942, it crashed after the pilot allowed a passenger to take his seat momentarily and the passenger activated the stabilizer control mechanism via a switch on the pilot's armrest, raising the stabilizer and sending the airplane into a nosedive from an altitude of 500 m (1,600 ft), killing all 36 on board.

== Operators ==
Soviet Union

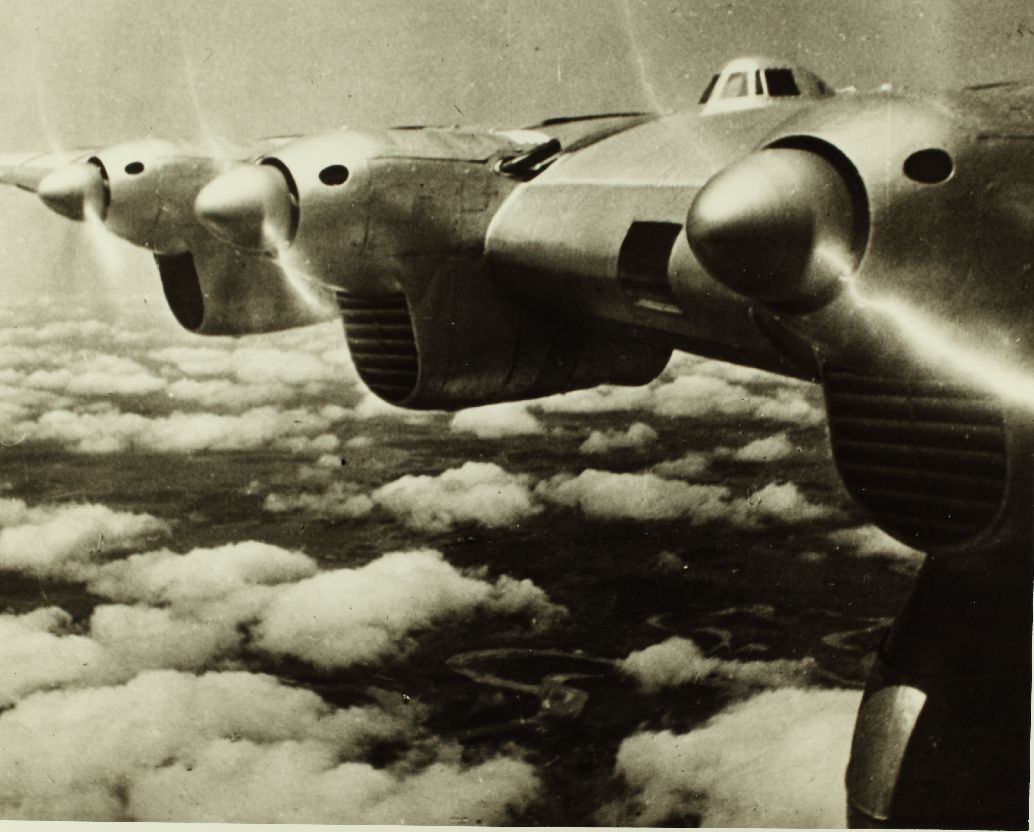
View of the starboard engines and the mechanic's pulpit housed in the wing for their monitoring from the cabin of the ANT-20bis

== Specifications ==
Data from The Osprey Encyclopedia of Russian Aircraft 1875–1995

General characteristics

- Crew: 8
- Capacity: 72 passengers
- Length: 32.9 m (107 ft 11 in)
- Wingspan: 63 m (206 ft 8 in)
- Height: 10.6 m (34 ft 9 in) on ground, tail down, over centre prop
- Wing area: 488 m^{2} (5,250 sq ft)
- Airfoil: root: TsAGI-6 (20%); tip: TsAGI-6 (10%)
- Empty weight: 28,500 kg (62,832 lb)
- Gross weight: 42,000 kg (92,594 lb)
- Max takeoff weight: 53,000 kg (116,845 lb)
- Powerplant: 8 × Mikulin AM-34FRN V-12 liquid-cooled piston engines, 671 kW (900 hp) each
- Propellers: 2-bladed variable-pitch propellers

Performance

- Maximum speed: 220 km/h (140 mph, 120 kn)
- Range: 1,200 km (750 mi, 650 nmi)
- Service ceiling: 4,500 m (14,800 ft)

== See also ==
Related development

- Tupolev TB-4

Aircraft of comparable role, configuration, and era

- Dornier Do X
- Junkers G.38
- Kalinin K-7

Related lists

- List of interwar military aircraft
