= 1942 Aeroflot Tupolev ANT-20bis crash =

Fatal crash of the Tupolev ANT-20bis in 1942

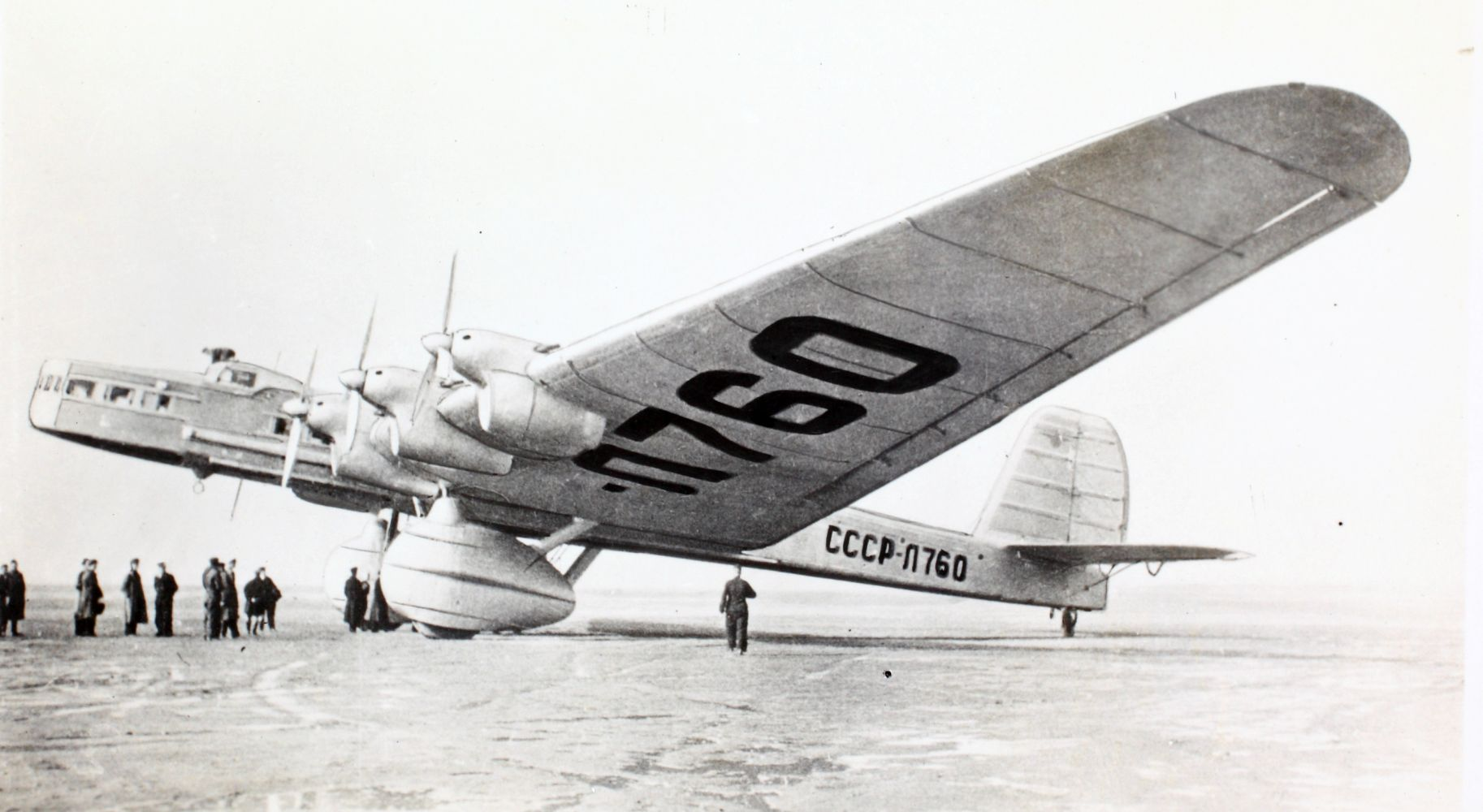
- CCCP-Л760, the aircraft involved

Accident
- Date: December 14, 1942
- Summary: Crew errors, loss of control
- Site: 86 km (53 mi) southwest of Tashkent

Aircraft
- Aircraft type: Tupolev PS-124
- Operator: Aeroflot
- Registration: СССР-Л760
- Flight origin: Urgench, Uzbek SSR
- Stopover: Chardzhou, Turkmen SSR
- Destination: Tashkent, Uzbek SSR
- Passengers: 26
- Crew: 10
- Fatalities: 36
- Survivors: 0

On 14 December 1942, a Tupolev ANT-20bis aircraft operated by Soviet airline Aeroflot crashed during a scheduled domestic passenger flight from Urgench to Tashkent, Uzbekistan. All 36 people on board died, and the accident was due to a loss of control.

== Aircraft ==
The ANT-20bis involved in the accident was built in 1938 to replace the ANT-20, which crashed in 1935. Equipped with more powerful Mikulin M-34FRNV engines, this allowed six engines instead of eight and eliminated the two engines above the fuselage. Passenger capacity increased to 64 as a result. Designated PS-124 (because it was built at Plant No. 124), it first flew on 15 May 1939. The aircraft was ferried to Moscow and after passing tests, it was registered as CCCP-Л760 and transferred to Aeroflot. The PS-124 operated on the Moscow–Kharkov–Rostov-on-Don–Mineralnye Vody route until it was transferred to Aeroflot's MAGON (Moscow Special Purpose Air Group) division in December 1940. At this point it was re-engined with Mikulin AM-35 engines. Due to World War II, the aircraft was transferred to Aeroflot's Uzbek division, serving Central Asian routes. On the day of the crash, the aircraft had a total operating time of 272 hours.

== Flight ==
On 12 December the aircraft flew from Urgench to Chardzhou (now Türkmenabat) with 85 passengers and 1,925 kg (4,244 lb) of cargo, piloted by I. I. Govyaz. Two days later at 11:50, the aircraft took off for Tashkent with 26 passengers and 10 crew, flying at 500 m (1,600 ft). Two hours and ten minutes into the flight, the aircraft suddenly pitched down and entered a steep dive, crashing into the ground at an 80° angle in the steppe three kilometres (two miles) northeast of the "Pakhta-Aral" state farm (86 km or 53 mi southwest of Tashkent Airport). None of the 36 on board survived.

== Investigation ==
Govyaz had allowed a passenger, Kozlov (also a pilot), to take control of the aircraft. Co-pilot Tropikov was to look after Kozlov while Govyaz left the cockpit. Kozlov somehow managed to activate the trimmer for the horizontal stabilizer, increasing its angle and sending the aircraft into a dive. Neither Kozlov nor Tropikov were able to regain control of the aircraft due to confusion and the aircraft's low altitude.

== See also ==
- Aeroflot Flight 593
- List of accidents and incidents involving commercial aircraft
