= China Eastern Airlines Flight 583 =

1993 aviation accident over the Pacific Ocean

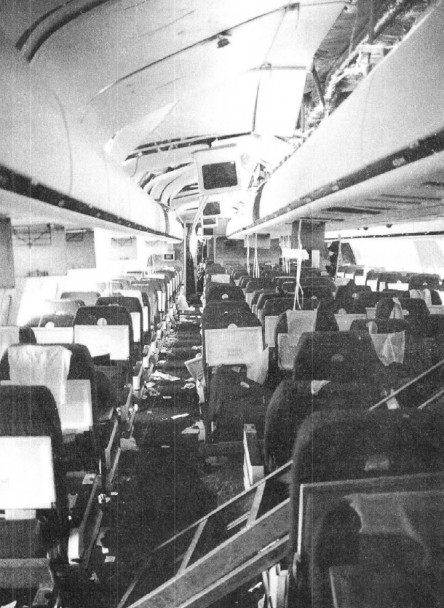
- The damage to the aircraft's cabin

Accident
- Date: April 6, 1993
- Summary: In-flight upset due to accidental deployment of slats caused by design flaw in flap/slat handle
- Site: Pacific Ocean, Near the Aleutian Islands; 39°N 172°E

Aircraft
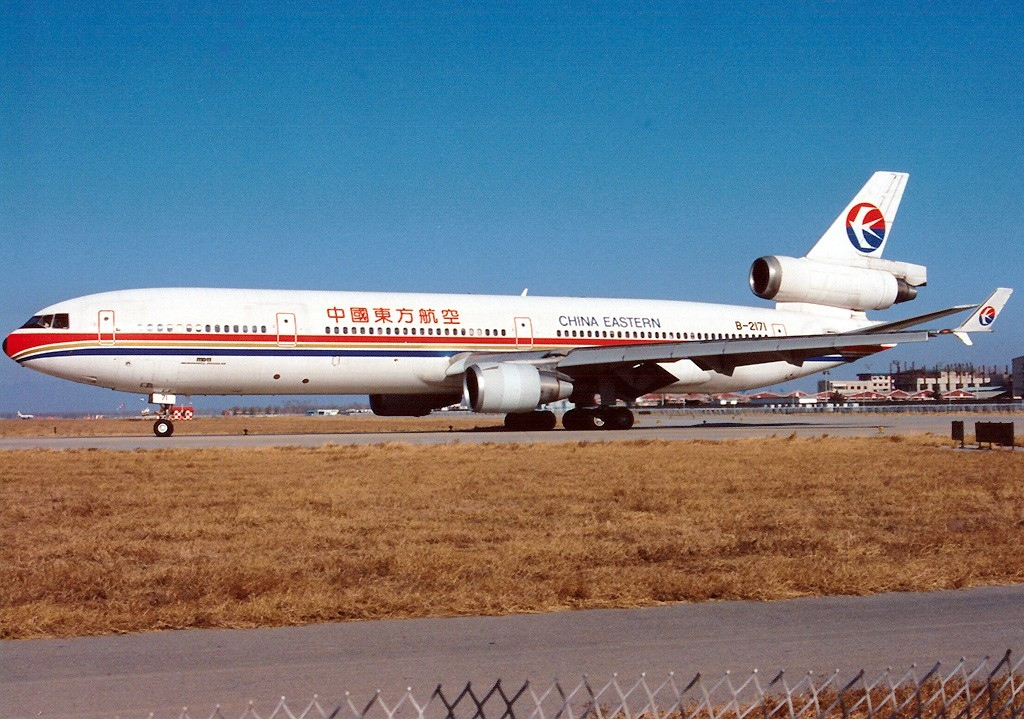
- B-2171, the aircraft involved in the accident, pictured in 1995 after being repaired
- Aircraft type: McDonnell Douglas MD-11
- Operator: China Eastern Airlines
- IATA flight No.: MU583
- ICAO flight No.: CES583
- Call sign: CHINA EASTERN 583
- Registration: B-2171
- Flight origin: Beijing Capital International Airport, Beijing, China
- Stopover: Hongqiao International Airport, Shanghai, China
- Destination: Los Angeles International Airport, Los Angeles, United States
- Occupants: 255
- Passengers: 235
- Crew: 20
- Fatalities: 2
- Injuries: 156
- Survivors: 253

China Eastern Airlines Flight 583 was a commercial passenger flight from Beijing, China, to Los Angeles, United States, with a stopover in Shanghai, China, operated by China Eastern Airlines. On April 6, 1993, the McDonnell Douglas MD-11 operating the Shanghai to Los Angeles sector experienced an in-flight upset due to a flight crew member inadvertently deploying the slats of the aircraft while the plane was cruising near the Aleutian Islands. The accident resulted in the death of two passengers and 156 injuries.

== Background ==
=== Aircraft ===
The aircraft involved was a McDonnell Douglas MD-11, with manufacturer serial number 48495 and registered as B-2171. It was built by McDonnell Douglas in 1991 and was equipped with three Pratt & Whitney PW4460 engines. The aircraft had logged approximately 4,810 airframe hours and 1,571 takeoff and landing cycles.

=== Crew ===
Twelve flight attendants were onboard, along with four cockpit crew members and four relief cockpit crew members.

== Accident ==
On April 6, 1993, the McDonnell-Douglas MD-11 operating the service was cruising above the Pacific Ocean near the Aleutian Islands at 296 knots (548 km/h; 341 mph). About 20 minutes after the relief crew took over, the aircraft was making a slow left turn when one of the relief crew members (likely the captain), while attempting to fix a speed indicator issue, accidentally deployed the slats. While attempting to correct the pitch up caused by the slat deployment, the crew caused the plane to enter severe oscillations after repeatedly over-correcting. After losing about 5,000 feet (1,524 m) of altitude, the aircraft stabilized and eventually made an emergency landing at Shemya Air Force Base in Shemya, Semichi Islands, Alaska.

Of the 255 passengers and crew, 60 were hospitalized, of whom 2 died. Of the cockpit crew, five received no injuries and three received serious injuries. Of the flight attendants, eight received no injuries and four received serious injuries. Of the surviving passengers, 84 received no injuries, 96 received minor injuries, and 53 received serious injuries. By April 24, 1993, all but three of the surviving passengers were discharged from the hospital.

An individual who translated for some of the Chinese passengers who were cared for in Alaska stated that, at the time, many Chinese people were not accustomed to flying and did not have a habit of keeping seat belts on in-flight.

Chinese speakers in Anchorage, Alaska volunteered to provide interpretation and emotional support for passengers with low English fluency.

== Investigation ==
The National Transportation Safety Board report found that the handle used to actuate the leading-edge flaps/slats was poorly designed, and the captain likely moved this handle unintentionally while performing an unrelated task. This unexpected slats deployment caused the nose to pitch up. The pilot returned the handle to the correct position and, in an effort to correct the plane's pitch, pushed the control column forward with enough force to trigger the autopilot to disengage, thus causing an abrupt nose-down elevator movement. The plane continued to oscillate between nose-up and nose-down pitch due to the pilot's over-correction of the elevator inputs until they were able to stabilize the plane's attitude. The violent pitching movement caused injuries to the occupants. At the time of the accident, passengers were either not wearing seat belts or had them loose, or were standing in the aisle, exacerbating the number and extent of injuries.

Other contributing factors included the lack of pilot training in high-altitude upset recovery, the light control force characteristics at cruising altitude, and the influence of the stall warning system engaging and disengaging during the oscillations on the pilot's control inputs.

== In popular culture ==
The accident was featured in season 25 of the Canadian documentary series Mayday, titled "Cabin Chaos".

Writer Michael Crichton used the accident as the basis of the plot point for his novel Airframe.
