= Air route authority between the United States and China =

Treaties governing flights between the United States and China

There are bilateral treaties that govern aviation rights between the United States and China, which cover both passenger services and cargo services. The United States has liberal aviation agreements with many countries and territories including an "open skies" agreement with Hong Kong since 2002, but there is no "open skies" agreement between the People's Republic of China and the US, which generally refers to an agreement that allows unrestricted flights between countries. The current US-China treaty specifies the number of flights permitted. Due to the highly regulated nature of awards for route authority between the two countries and the strict limits on number of flights, the application process is competitive. US airlines have sought to gain support from local politicians and the general public to influence the US government into awarding routes.

== Flight operations ==
In 2006, there were 10 non-stop flights between the two countries, amounting to 2 million passenger trips per year.

Beginning in 2013, there were 28 non-stop routes (not including Hong Kong and Macau) operated by three major U.S. carriers: United, American, and Delta; and four Chinese carriers: Air China, China Eastern, China Southern, and Hainan Airlines.

Beginning in 2018, there were 61 non-stop routes (not including Hong Kong and Macau) operated by four US carriers: United, American, Delta, and Hawaiian; and six Chinese carriers: Air China, China Eastern, China Southern, Hainan, Xiamen, and Sichuan Airlines.

Among the US carriers:

- (9) United Airlines flies non-stop between Beijing and San Francisco, Chicago, Newark, and Washington as well as non-stop Shanghai service from San Francisco, Chicago, Newark, and Los Angeles as well as nonstop Chengdu service from San Francisco. United ended service to Hangzhou on 16 October 2017.
- (7) Delta Air Lines flies non-stop flights between Detroit and Seattle and Shanghai and Beijing. Delta also flies nonstop between Los Angeles and Shanghai. Delta relaunched nonstop flights between Atlanta and Shanghai on 20 July 2018.
- (5) American Airlines flies between Beijing and Dallas/Fort Worth, Shanghai and Dallas/Fort Worth, and Shanghai and Los Angeles (may transfer from LAX to SEA).
- Hawaiian Airlines ended flights to Beijing on October 12, 2018,

Following a 1987 directive, six Chinese airlines were formed in 1988 when CAAC, the Chinese airline and government regulatory agency for aviation was split and reorganized. Now there are six Chinese carriers (which are different from the original six companies) which operate US-China air routes:

- (8) Air China flies non-stop Beijing flights to San Francisco, Los Angeles, New York, Newark, Houston, Honolulu, and Washington. and from Shenzhen to Los Angeles. Air China ended nonstop flights from Shanghai to San Jose on September 25, 2018.
- (7) China Eastern flies non-stop Shanghai flights to Los Angeles, New York, Honolulu, San Francisco and Chicago. China Eastern also flies non-stop Nanjing, Chengdu, to Los Angeles, and Qingdao to San Francisco.
- (4+1) China Southern flies non-stop flights between Guangzhou and Los Angeles since August 1997. China Southern also opened a direct flight from Guangzhou to New York in August 2014. China Southern also flies nonstop flights between Wuhan and San Francisco as well as between Guangzhou and San Francisco. China Southern launched nonstop flights between Shenyang and Los Angeles on December 18, 2018. In mid 2019, China Southern launched non-stop flights between Wuhan and New York.
- (12) Hainan Airlines flies non-stop flights from Beijing to Seattle, Chicago, Boston, San Jose, and Las Vegas. Hainan also flies non-stop flights from Shanghai to Boston and Seattle. Hainan also flies from Changsha to Los Angeles and also flies from Chengdu to Los Angeles and Chongqing to Los Angeles. Hainan launched nonstop flights from Chongqing and New York on October 20, 2017, and from Chengdu and New York on 26 October 2017.
- (3) XiamenAir flies from Shenzhen to Seattle with continuing service to Xiamen. XiamenAir also flies from Fuzhou to New York. XiamenAir also flies from Xiamen to Los Angeles via Qingdao.
- (2) Sichuan Airlines flies nonstop flights from Hangzhou, Jinan to Los Angeles.

The number of airlines with non-stop services between cities in China and the United States before 2020:

Number of airlines with non-stop services between cities in China and the United States in 2019
City	Zone 1				Zone 2							Zone 3					
City	Beijing Capital (PEK)	Beijing Daxing (PKX)	Shanghai Pudong (PVG)	Guangzhou	Shenzhen	Hangzhou	Nanjing	Jinan	Qingdao	Fuzhou	Xiamen	Chengdu	Chongqing	Changsha	Wuhan	Shenyang	Total
Los Angeles	2		4	1	1	1	1	1	1		3	1	1		1	1	19
San Francisco	2		2	1					1			1			1		8
New York (JFK)	2		1	1						1		1	1		1		8
New York (EWR)	2		1														3
Chicago	3		3														6
Seattle	1	1	2		1												5
Honolulu	1		1														2
Dallas/Fort Worth	1		1														2
Boston	1		1														2
San Jose	1		0														1
Detroit		1	1														2
Washington DC	2																2
Houston	1																1
Las Vegas	1																1
Atlanta			1														1
Total	20	2	18	3	5	2	2	1	1	1	2	1	2	1	1	1	63

The airlines flying between China and the United States cooperate in airline alliance and through codesharing. Participating in airline alliances and codesharing is intended to increase passenger traffic on the airline by allowing reciprocal frequent flyer program benefits and increasing the number of flights that an airline offers, even though the flights are operated by another airline. The first marketing alliance between airlines of the two countries was established in 1996 between Northwest Airlines and Air China.

Star Alliance members using the US-China Air Route Authority are United Airlines, and Air China. SkyTeam includes Delta and China Eastern. The Oneworld alliance includes American with direct service (and outside the Authority, Cathay Pacific/Dragonair via Hong Kong).

== Early history ==
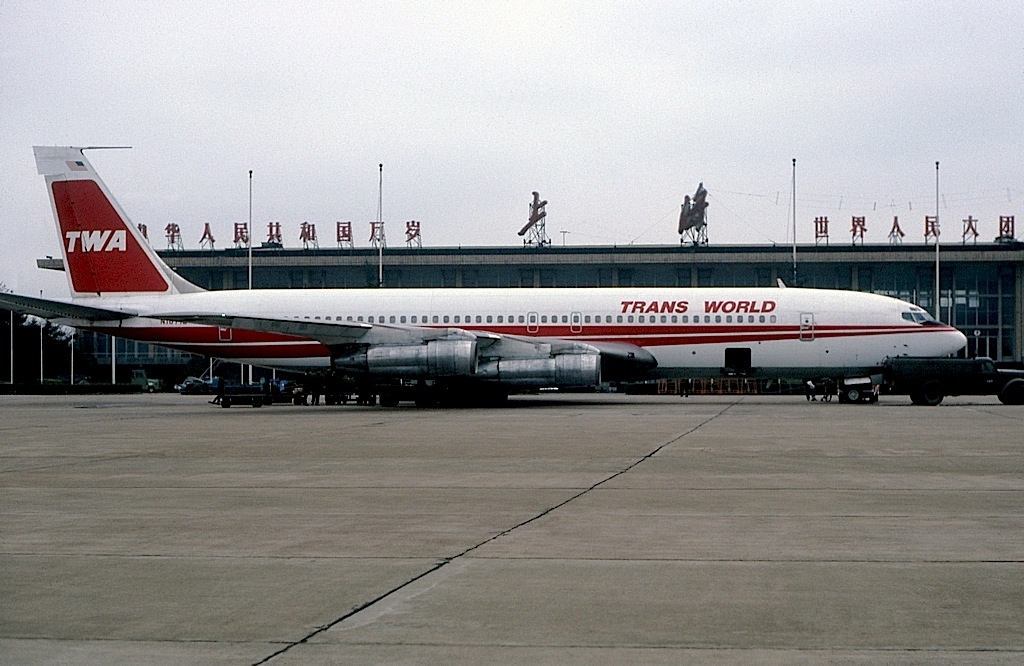
A Trans World Airlines Boeing 707 flying a charter flight at Shanghai Hongqiao International Airport in 1980.

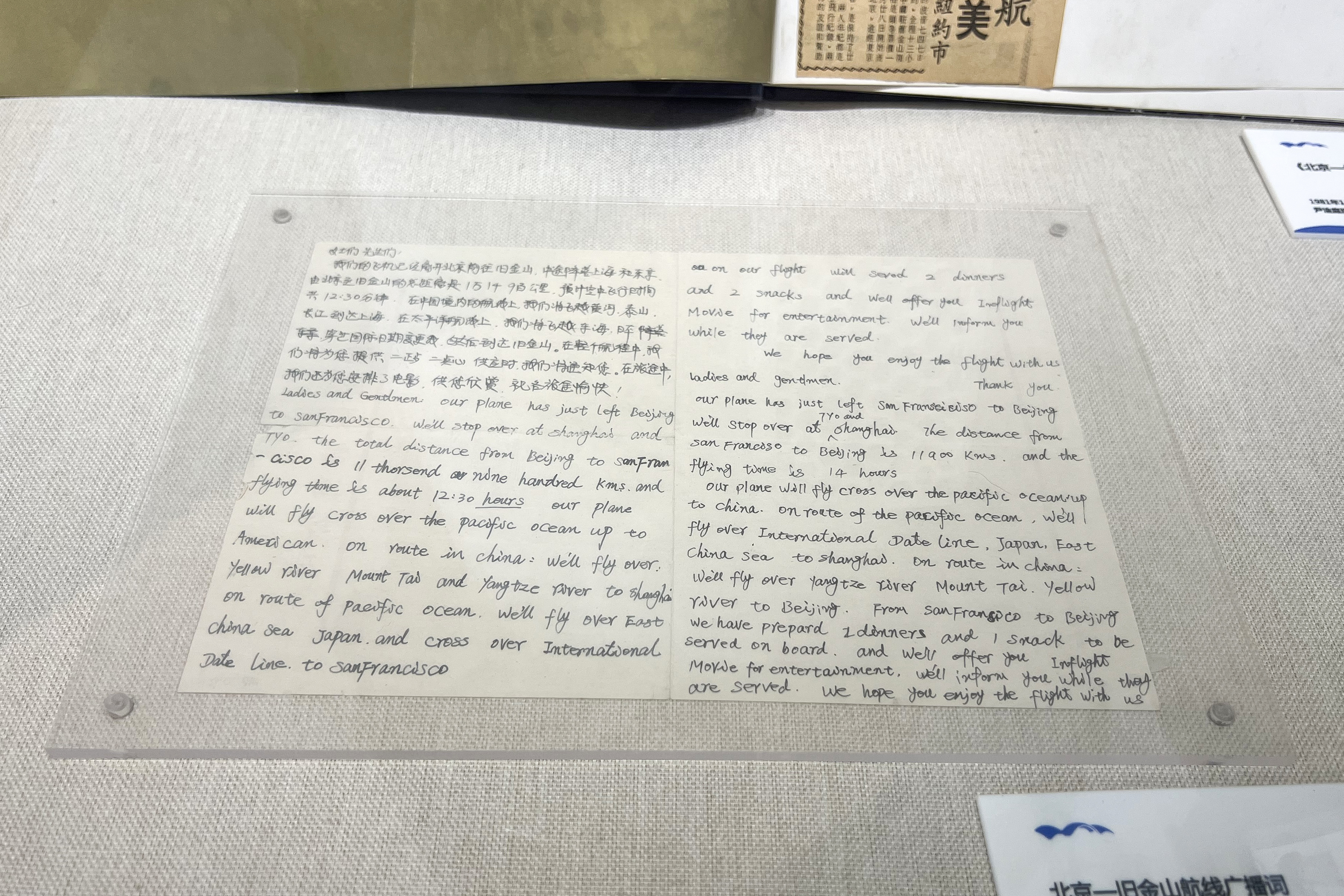
Passenger announcement script of CAAC Beijing-San Francisco flight in 1981

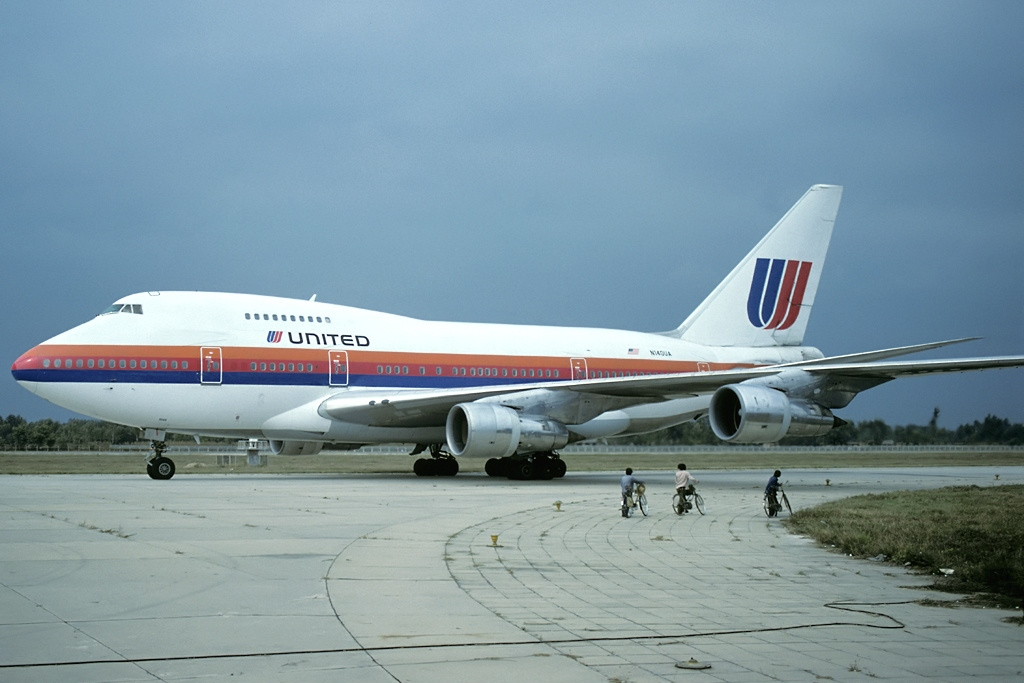
A United Airlines Boeing 747SP taxis at Beijing Capital International Airport in 1988.

In 1979, diplomatic relations between the People's Republic of China and the United States were established. Previously, there had been no air service between China and the United States after 1949 although there were flights between the United States and sections of Taiwan Area controlled by the government based in Taipei (Taiwan). Hong Kong, which was previously a British Crown Colony until 1981 and a British dependent territory from 1981 to 1997, is now a part of China but has a separate air agreement with the United States. Macau, formerly governed by Portugal but now governed by China, also has a separate air agreement with the United States. Taiwan is under de facto control by the government based in Taipei, not Beijing. Due to the severing of diplomatic relations with the Republic of China (Taiwan) by the United States in 1978 in order to establish relations with the People's Republic of China and because the mainland government does not control Taiwan, there is no air service agreement between the United States concerning Taiwan. However, there is an air service agreement between the American Institute in Taiwan and the Taipei Economic and Cultural Representative Office in the United States.

On Sep 17, 1980, China and the US signed the bilateral air agreement.

=== First Direct Service ===
In January 1981, CAAC and Pan Am began flying between China and the United States. On Jan 7 1981, CAAC inaugurated the Beijing–Shanghai–San Francisco–New York City CA981/982 service; on Jan 28, Pan Am inaugurated the New York–Tokyo–Beijing (soon rerouted as New York–Tokyo–Shanghai–Beijing starting Jan 31) service; on April 4, CAAC inaugurated the Beijing–Tokyo–San Francisco–New York City (soon rerouted as Beijing–Shanghai–San Francisco) CA983/984 service. In April 1982, CAAC inaugurated the Beijing–Shanghai–San Francisco–Los Angeles CA985/986. All services operate weekly.

Northwest Airlines resumed flying to China in 1984. Its application to operate twice-per-week Seattle–Tokyo–Shanghai flight starting May 2 was approved by CAAC before U.S. President Ronald Reagan's state visit to China. Due to route restrictions and aircraft capacity limitations, many flights between China and the United States had stopovers in Japan. Based on the Japan-US Aviation Agreement, Northwest Airlines and Pan American World Airways operated fifth freedom routes to various Asian countries from Tokyo (initially Haneda Airport, then Narita Airport once opened). Facing financial troubles, Pan Am sold its Pacific route authority, as well as aircraft and equipment, to United Airlines in 1985 leading to United Airlines operating former Pan Am routes over the Pacific in February 1986.。

In 1988, the CAAC was split into multiple airlines. Air China retrieved CAAC's route authority over its US flight. The new China Eastern Airlines inaugurated twice-per-week Beijing–Shanghai–Los Angeles flight starting August 6, 1991.。

Due to the small number of flights, air fares tend to be high between the two countries.

Although the stated goal of both countries is for an open skies agreement, the process of reaching such an agreement has taken several years and has not been completed. Liu Weimin, director of the Aviation Laws Research Centre with the Civil Aviation Management Institute of China, has said "Under the current market situation, local carriers have a hard time competing against global giants such as Continental. That is why US airlines are enthusiastic to fly to China, while Chinese carriers are hesitating to open more flights. For local airlines, more flights may mean more losses if they cannot get enough passengers." There have been reports that the load factors (percentage of seats sold) in business and first class are lower on Chinese carriers than on US carriers.

Not all of the route authority of the Chinese airlines is used.

=== First non-stop Extended service ===
The first scheduled non-stop flight between the two countries took place on May 1, 1996, between Detroit and Beijing, and was operated by Northwest Airlines three times a week. Northwest Airlines began Detroit-Shanghai non-stop flights twice a week starting April 6, 2000, before discontinuing non-stop service 18 months later and discontinuing non-stop Detroit-Beijing service in 2002. (the route was later re-instated on July 1, 2011, under the Delta Air Lines brand) Northwest Airlines then became the only airline authorized to fly China that did not offer any non-stop service to that country until it resumed non-stop flights between Detroit and Shanghai on June 1, 2009 (as part of its new parent, Delta Air Lines).

China Southern Airlines inaugurated the non-stop flight from Guangzhou to Los Angeles on July 20, 1997, using a Boeing 777-200ER aircraft. It was the world's first airline to operate trans-Pacific flights with twin-engine aircraft under the ETOPS.

In April 2000, United Airlines discontinued Shanghai–Tokyo service and launched its first US–China non-stop service from San Francisco to Shanghai. In June 2000, United Airlines discontinued Beijing–Tokyo service and started non-stop Beijing–San Francisco service. This replacement of services was done because of the restrictions on the number of flights permitted under the 1999 air services agreement. Since then, all China routes serviced by United Airlines are non-stop. United's Beijing–Tokyo service was re-instated on October 26 as a temporary replacement for the Dulles–Beijing non-stop service (which was suspended for the winter season). United's Dulles–Beijing service operates year-round.

China Eastern began service to San Francisco in 1997 but has since discontinued passenger service to the airport, though cargo flights continue to be operated. China Eastern later resumed service to San Francisco on April 26, 2013. Passenger service to Chicago via Seattle has also been discontinued. Several Chinese airlines operated services to Anchorage, primarily as a fuel stop but such stops are no longer operated, in part because of long range aircraft in service.

In 2007, Delta Air Lines won the bid to operate non-stop flights between Atlanta and Shanghai. However, in 2009, only one year after having won the route, Delta suspended the route due to weak customer demand, the struggling US economy, high fuel prices, and the H1N1 flu pandemic. Delta flew its final Atlanta-Shanghai route on September 1, 2009. Delta replaced Northwest on its Detroit–Shanghai service using its Boeing 777 on October 24, 2009. Delta re-instated the Atlanta to Shanghai route on June 5, 2011, operating 2 days a week, as part of the carrier's international expansion for 2011. The route, however, ceased on January 17, 2012, for the second time citing poor performance on the route.

== 1999 to 2007 ==
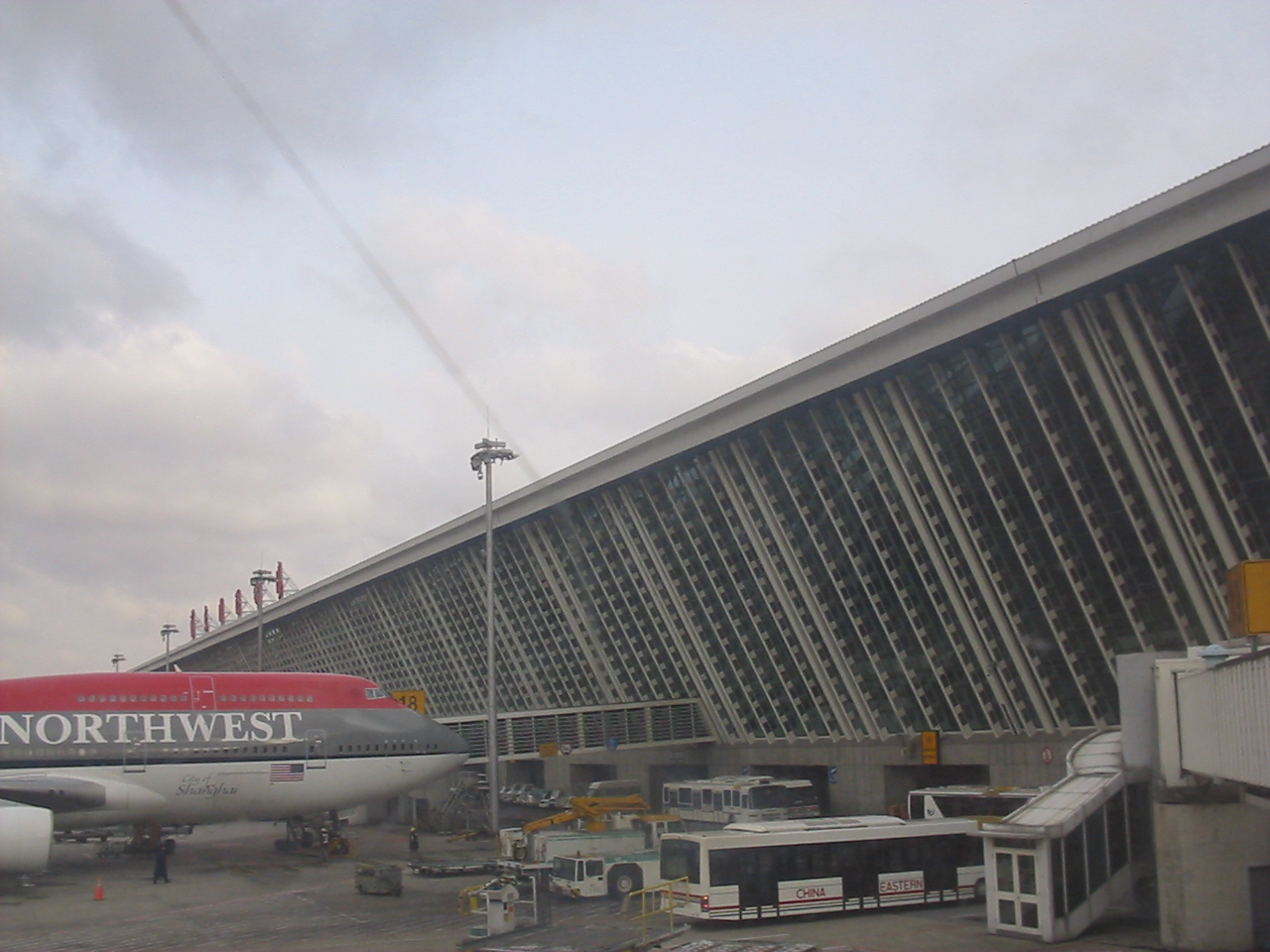
Northwest Airlines aircraft at Shanghai Pudong International Airport in 2006

=== 1999 Air Services Agreement ===
Concluded in April 1999, airlines from each country were allowed to increase the number of weekly flights from 27 to 54, including cargo flights. 20 of these flights were designated for all-cargo flights. Each country was allowed to designate one additional airline so that four airlines from each country were allowed to fly between the two countries.

United Airlines gained additional frequencies under this agreement and, in April 2000, started non-stop Shanghai-San Francisco service.

=== 2004 agreement ===
A new agreement was signed July 2004

The agreement allowed each country's carriers to serve any city in the other country. In practice, service between the two countries occurs between three large Chinese cities and a few cities in the U.S. Prior to the agreement, Chinese carriers were limited to 12 U.S. cities, and U.S. passenger carriers to only five Chinese cities. The agreement permitted unlimited code-sharing between U.S. and Chinese airlines, which had previously been limited to certain cities.

At the time of the agreement, there were plans for additional negotiations to begin in 2006 which led to another agreement in 2007.

The 2004 agreement led to the 2005 expansion of flights between the two countries as well as new service by Northwest Airlines from Tokyo to Guangzhou, which began on November 1, 2004, operated using Boeing 757 aircraft. (The route was planned to be resumed on July 6, 2011, by Delta, however, the airline indefinitely postponed the route.) United Airlines began non-stop Chicago–Shanghai flights on October 31, 2004.

=== 2005 expansion ===
In June 2005, the U.S. Department of Transportation awarded American Airlines authority to fly between Chicago and Shanghai as well as authority to Continental Airlines to fly between Newark and Beijing.

=== 2006 expansion ===
In 2006, several U.S. airlines applied for additional route authority that was granted in 2007. The United Airlines application to fly between Dulles International Airport near Washington, D.C., and Beijing was selected. The route started operating on March 25, 2007, using Boeing 747-400 aircraft.

In addition to United's application, American Airlines, Continental Airlines and Northwest Airlines had also applied for route authority.

Continental applied for rights to fly between Newark, New Jersey, and Shanghai. Northwest applied for the right to fly to Shanghai from Detroit. American's application originally was for non-stop service between Dallas/Fort Worth and Beijing, but changed the application to include an eastbound stop in Chicago after an impasse with pilots regarding work hours on the planned flight.

== Expansion from 2007 to 2009 based on the 2007 agreement ==
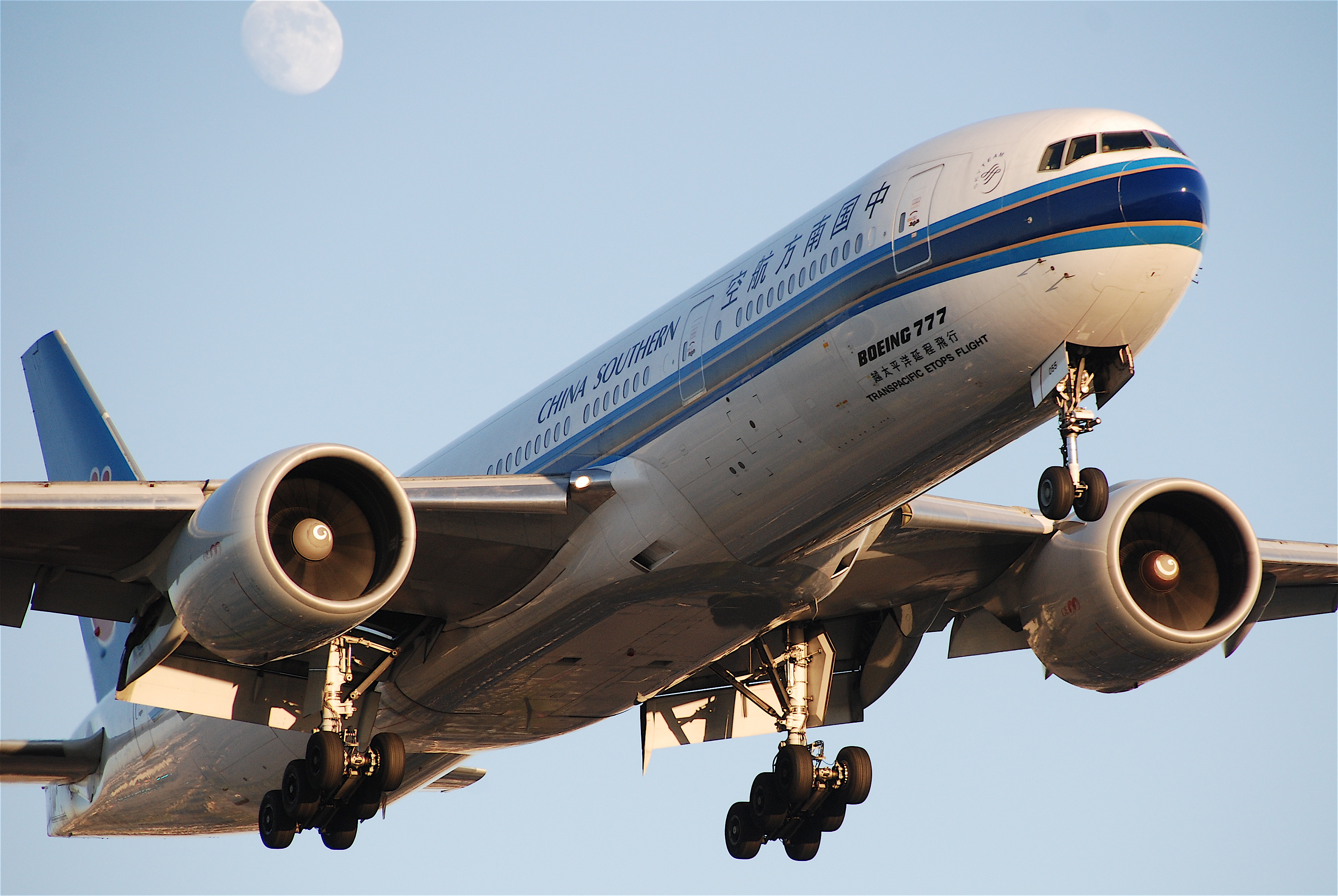
China Southern used to operate Boeing 777 aircraft on flights between Guangzhou and Los Angeles until October 2012

In April 2006, the two countries began negotiations for further liberalization of the bilateral agreement. Talks were suspended in August 2006, but later resumed. The United States has stated that suspension of talks was due to an unrelated issue. Unofficial Chinese sources report that there was concern because of a "gap" in Chinese airlines' ability to compete with U.S. airlines. Negotiations were scheduled to resume in January 2007.

An agreement reached on July 7, 2007, allows nearly unlimited service between China and Guam and between China and the Northern Mariana Islands. These unlimited rights do not include Beijing or Shanghai flights operated by US airlines but do include those cities for mainland Chinese airlines.

The 2007 agreement also categorizes Chinese cities by "zones" in which each of the zone have different air routes capacity limits and regulations.

- China Zone 1: Beijing, Shanghai, and Guangzhou;
- China Zone 2: Fujian, Guangdong (except Guangzhou), Hebei, Jiangsu, Shandong, Tianjin, and Zhejiang
- China Zone 3: Other provinces

Flights operate directly between the US and China Zone 3 cities are not subject to frequency limitations.

Not including the potential expansion to Guam and Saipan (Northern Mariana Islands), by 2011 the current bilateral between the two countries will expand the number of US airlines flying to China from four to nine airlines and from 54 passenger flights weekly to 249.

Negotiations for an open skies agreement were scheduled to begin not later than March 25, 2010, according to a treaty between the two countries.

For the 2007, 2008, and 2009 awards, the Department of Transportation awarded routes at one time instead of considering one year at a time. United and Delta objected unsuccessfully to have the process separated.

=== 2007 expansion ===
One award to a new entrant, an airline not flying to China, was decided. Delta applied for Atlanta–Shanghai using 777-200ER initially then 777-200LR when they are delivered in 2008. Northwest applied for route authority as a new entrant, claiming that although it flies to China, it does so via Japan and not non-stop. It envisioned using a 747-400 if awarded the route in 2007 but planned to use a 787 if awarded the route in 2009.

Several sources have noted that before the route authority was granted, Delta was virtually assured of being awarded the route. The DOT awarded the route to Delta on September 25, 2007. Delta announced that it will begin service on March 30, 2008, one of the latest dates that they were allowed to begin. The route was later suspended in September 2009. However, Delta re-instated the route starting June 5, 2011.

=== 2008 expansion ===
One award for flights between Guangzhou and the United States was granted. Only United Airlines applied and was granted rights. It planned San Francisco–Guangzhou service using a Boeing 777. However, United delayed the route to June 30, 2010, due to the sudden decrease in international travel.

=== 2009 expansion ===
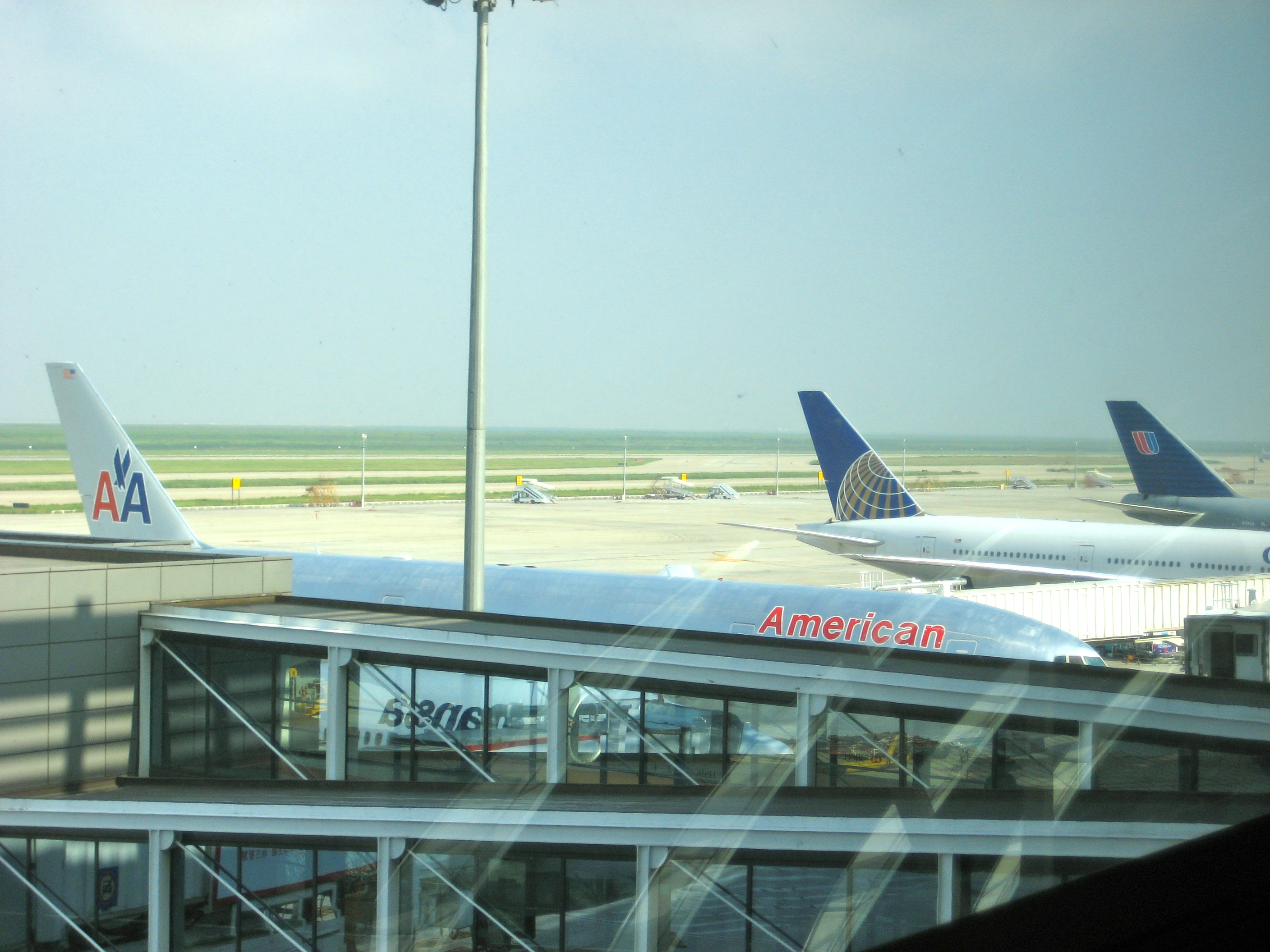
American, Continental and United aircraft at Shanghai Pudong International Airport (2009)

One award was granted to a new entrant airline as stated by the DOT when applications were sought. Hawaiian Airlines has withdrawn its application. US Airways applied for Philadelphia–Beijing authority using an Airbus A340-300, an aircraft that it neither operates nor has any firm orders to buy. Maxjet applied for rights between Seattle and Shanghai using an all business class configured Boeing 767-200ER. US Airways was granted rights by the DOT over Maxjet citing more seat availability and greater connecting possibilities with the US Airways bid. However, the airline relinquished the DOT authorization for Beijing at the end of 2009.

Hainan Airlines began service from Beijing to Seattle with A330 equipment.

Three routes to U.S. carriers that were not new entrants were awarded. There were applications for six routes.

- Northwest applied for Detroit–Beijing using a Boeing 787 to be granted if it is not award the route using a Boeing 747-400 in 2007. It also applied for a 787 operated Detroit–Shanghai route.
- United Airlines applied for Los Angeles–Shanghai using 747-400 aircraft. Washington–Shanghai is an alternate routing of above application.
- American Airlines applied for Chicago–Beijing (to have begun April 26, 2010; which actually launched May 25, 2010 after numerous delays).
- Continental applied for Newark–Shanghai using a Boeing 777-200ER Continental had previously applied for the same route some years earlier in which United was awarded the Washington–Beijing route. Delta applied for Atlanta–Beijing using a Boeing 777.

The American Airlines, Continental Airlines and Northwest Airlines route applications were granted. The DOT cited the United application as "not addressing the broader competitive needs" given that United has approximately half of the flights by U.S. carriers to China. The DOT cited American's OneWorld airline alliance as having less access to the US–China market as one of the factors in its decision.

In a hint of the DOT's decision-making process and preferences, it stated in its report intention to grant Continental and American Airlines route authority that "this tentatively leaves seven frequencies to be awarded ... Delta and Northwest." The DOT stated that Northwest, which already had route authority between Detroit and China but has chosen to fly the route via Tokyo (though it did operate some non-stop flights in the past), was applying for additional Detroit–China authority. Such application was denied in the past due to the limited number of new route authority but that now there is more leeway with more flights permitted by treaty. The DOT selected Detroit–Shanghai over Detroit–Beijing. The DOT noted that Delta was not awarded its route application because it would not have much experience in the Chinese market when the 2009 award was to start, given that it would only begin Atlanta–Shanghai service on March 30, 2008. The Atlanta–Shanghai Delta service was suspended on September 1, 2009, but was re-instated on June 5, 2011; the route, however, ceased again on January 17, 2012, due to poor loads. Delta also applied to the US DOT to begin non-stop flights between Detroit and Beijing starting July 1, 2011.

=== New restrictions on sale of route authority by U.S. carriers ===
The DOT also announced, along with its 2007–2009 route authority awards, that route authority must be operated for five years before it could be sold. Previously, the required period was one year.

== 2010 to 2019 ==
=== 2010 expansion ===
DOT approved the requests for a new route between Shanghai and Los Angeles from American Airlines and United Airlines at the end of 2010. Delta has decided to reactivate its Shanghai–Atlanta route. Delta is also granted a new route between Beijing and Detroit.

=== 2011 for Hawaii ===
In September, 2011, China Eastern starts non-stop service between Shanghai and Honolulu.

=== 2012–13 route transfer ===
Delta Air Lines again suspended its Atlanta–Shanghai route as of January 18, 2012, stating the route had "performed poorly." Following this route closure, Delta announced a new Seattle–Shanghai route effective June 17, 2013, the second Seattle-China route operated by this airline (after Delta's Seattle–Beijing route which was launched 3 years earlier).

=== 2013 expansion ===
China Eastern resumed Shanghai-San Francisco service in April.

On January 15, 2013, Air China announced its plans to launch non-stop service between Houston and Beijing, beginning Thursday, July 11, 2013, pending approval from the United States Department of Transportation.

On April 10, 2013, Hawaiian Airlines announced its plans to launch non-stop service between Honolulu and Beijing, China on 16 April 2014, pending approvals by U.S. and Chinese regulatory agencies.

In September, United gets DOT OK for San Francisco–Chengdu route. The first flight of this route would be on June 9, 2014.

On October 16, 2013, American Airlines announced that they were proposing a directly flight between Dallas/Fort Worth and Shanghai, starting 11 June 2014.

In December, Hainan Airlines announced that they planned to launch direct flights between China's capital city Beijing and the U.S. city of Boston, starting 20 June 2014.

=== 2014 expansion ===
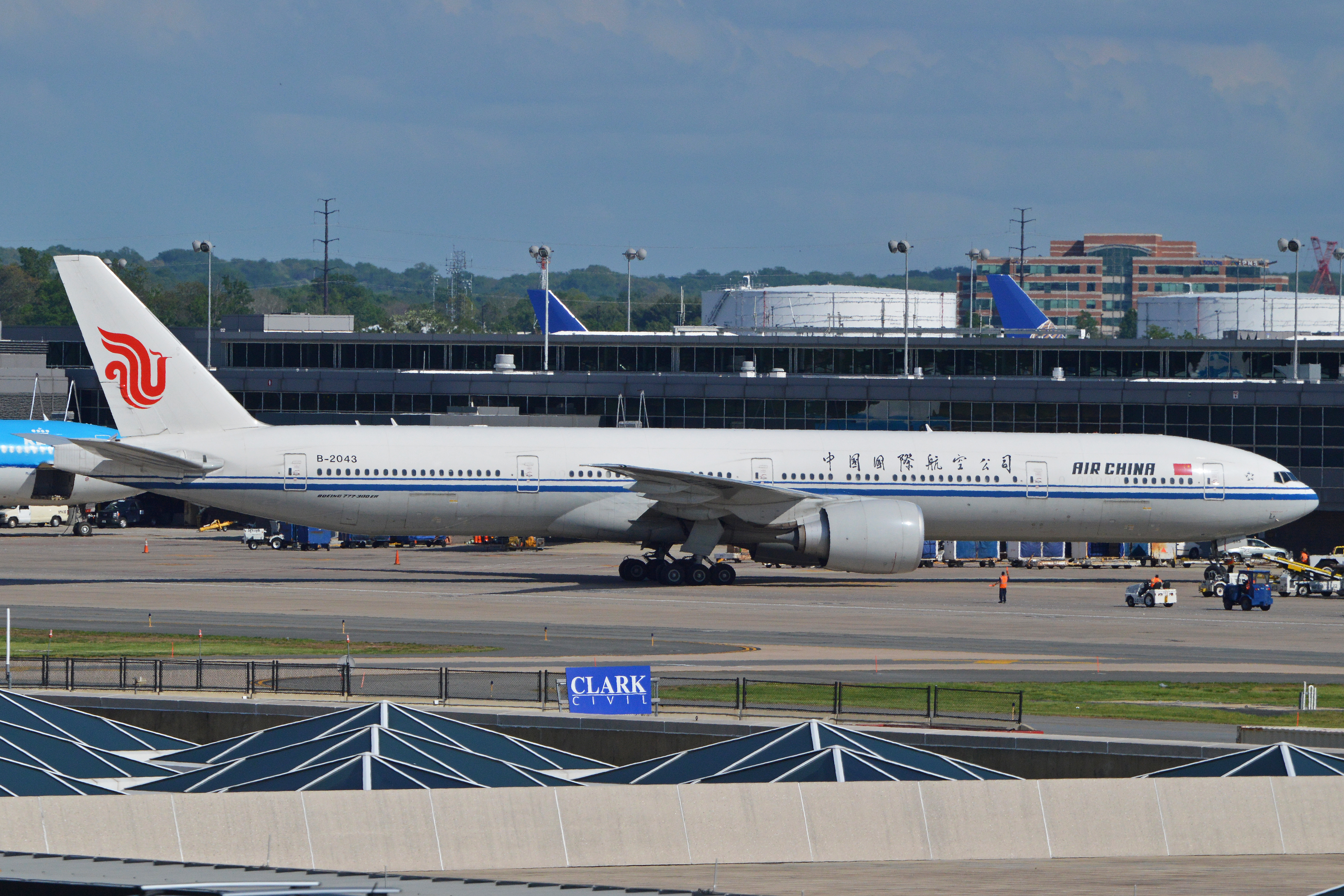
An Air China Boeing 777 at Washington Dulles International Airport.

Air China has aggressively expanded its nonstop service between the US and China. In June, Air China launch a new nonstop route connecting Washington Dulles and Beijing. Air China's Honolulu-Beijing nonstop flights began on Jan. 21. Beginning March 30, the carrier will upgrade its service between Houston and Beijing from four flights a week to daily service.

American Airlines initiated service from Dallas/Fort Worth to Shanghai while also initiating service to Hong Kong on June 11, 2014.

China Southern added direct service between Guangzhou and New York on August 6, 2014.

Hainan Airlines initiated service between Beijing and Boston on June 20, 2014.

=== 2014 for Hawaii ===
In 2014, Hawaiian and Air China will join China Eastern Airlines in connecting passengers between Honolulu and the country that tourism leaders see as the next growth market for the islands.

=== 2015 expansion ===
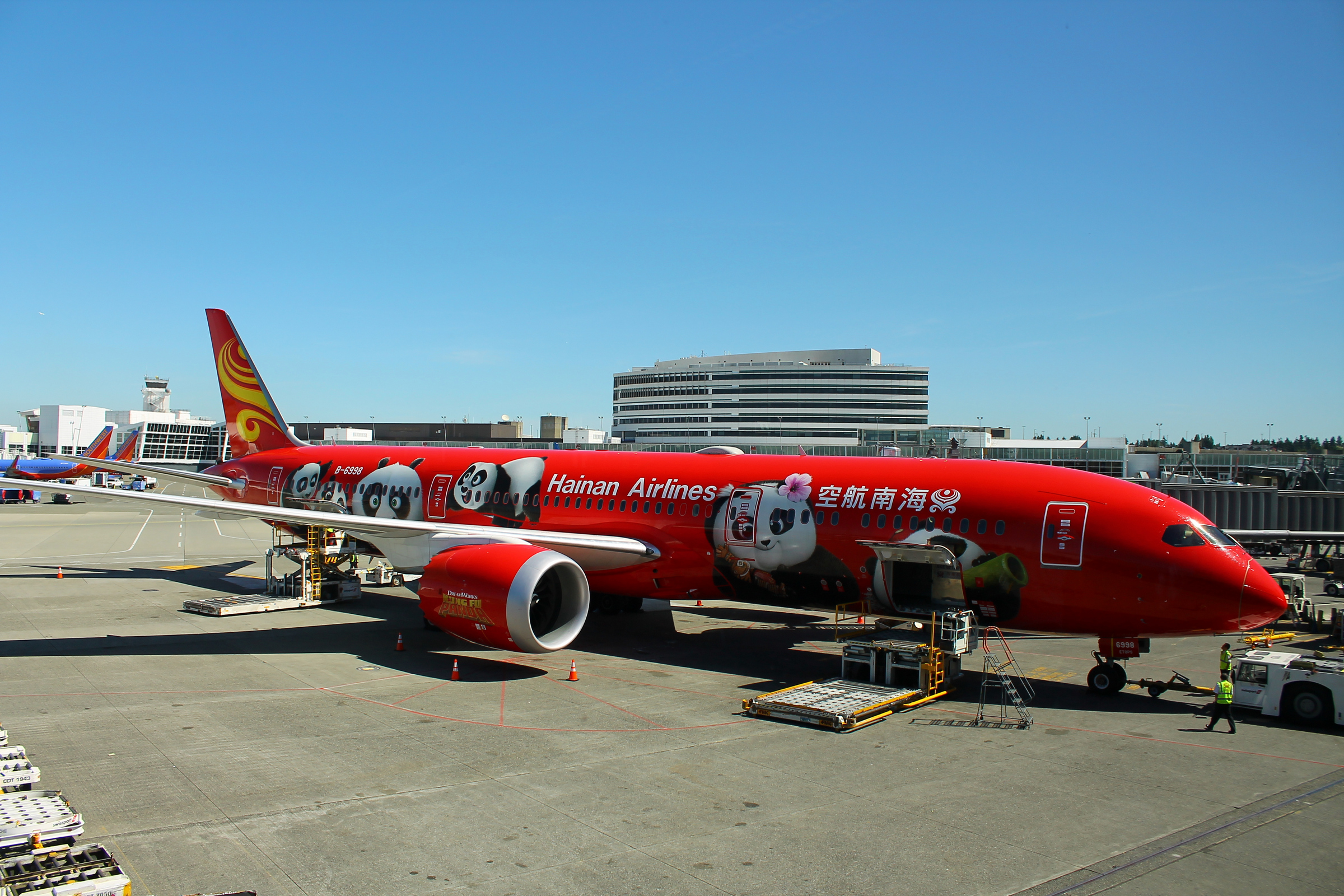
A Hainan Airlines Boeing 787 Dreamliner at Seattle–Tacoma International Airport

American Airlines initiated nonstop service between Dallas/Fort Worth (DFW) and Beijing on May 7.

Hainan Airlines initiated nonstop service between Beijing Capital International Airport (PEK) and Mineta San José International Airport. Hainan also initiated service to both Boston and Seattle from Shanghai, becoming the first Chinese airline to fly to North America from more than one base in mainland China. (SJC) on June 15.

China Eastern Airlines launched a direct flight connecting Nanjing, capital city of East China's Jiangsu province, and Los Angeles on June 30.

Air China strengthened service to the New York area in the 4th quarter of 2015, as it began Beijing – Newark service 4 times a week. The Boeing 777-300ER operated this route from October 26, 2015.

On September 22, 2015, United Airlines announced that it is seeking regulatory approval to begin seasonal flights between its San Francisco hub and the interior Chinese city of Xi'an, effective May 2016. The service would operate from mid-May through late October. However, United Airlines terminated this service on December 9, 2017.

=== 2016 expansion ===
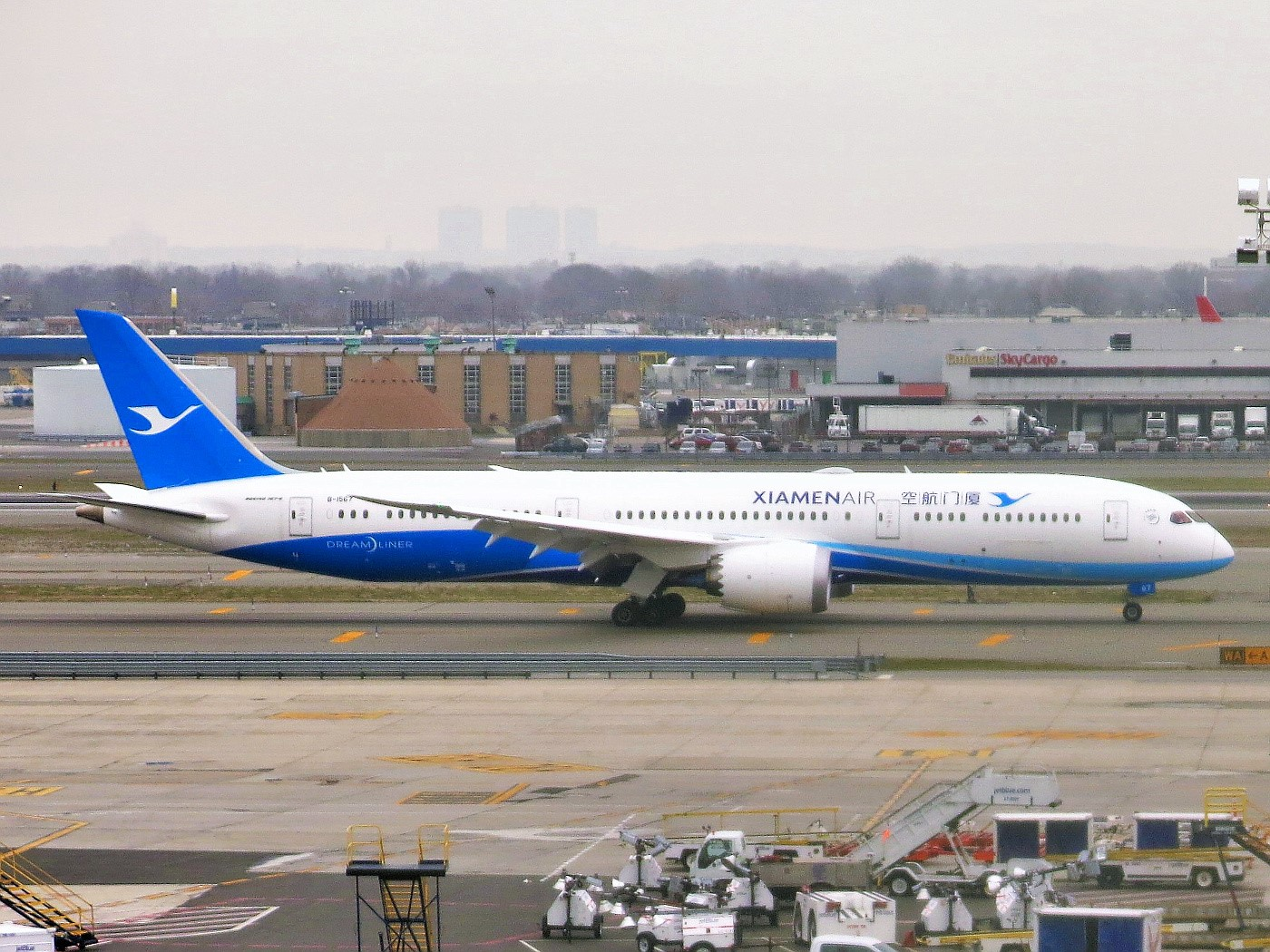
A XiamenAir Boeing 787-9 at JFK Airport, New York.

On January 21, 2016, Hainan Airlines launched a route between the Chinese city Changsha of Hunan province and Los Angeles, the company's eighth North American route. The airline uses the Boeing 787 Dreamliner for the new, twice-weekly service operating every Monday and Thursday, which will have a flight duration of approximately 13.5 hours.

On March 9, 2016, United announced that it would launch service to the Chinese city Hangzhou from San Francisco, the airline's fifth destination in mainland China. The airline started the route on July 13, 2016 (from San Francisco); July 15, 2016 (from Hangzhou) using the Boeing 787-9 Dreamliner aircraft. However, this service terminated on October 16, 2017.

On May 11, 2016, Xiamen Airlines announced service to Shenzhen from Seattle. The aircraft route began on September 26, 2016, in the city of Xiamen (headquarters to Xiamen Airlines), then shuttle to Shenzhen before making the nonstop flight to Seattle. This route ended in September 2019.

On September 1, Air China commenced nonstop service between San Jose and Shanghai. Air China became the 2nd Chinese airline to fly into Silicon Valley.

On September 29, China Eastern Airlines commenced non-stop service between San Francisco and its growing base in Qingdao. The route was previously marketed as a one-stop flight via Shanghai-Pudong but was transitioned to a 3 time weekly non-stop service on their A330-200 aircraft.

On October 14, United Airlines began to operate their second daily Shanghai-San Francisco flight, on board Boeing 787-9 aircraft.

On December 2, 2016, Hainan Airlines has just launched their newest US route, 3x weekly flights between Las Vegas and Beijing as of December 2, 2016. The flight will be operated by a Boeing 787, with the schedule on Mondays, Wednesdays, and Fridays.

=== 2017 expansion ===
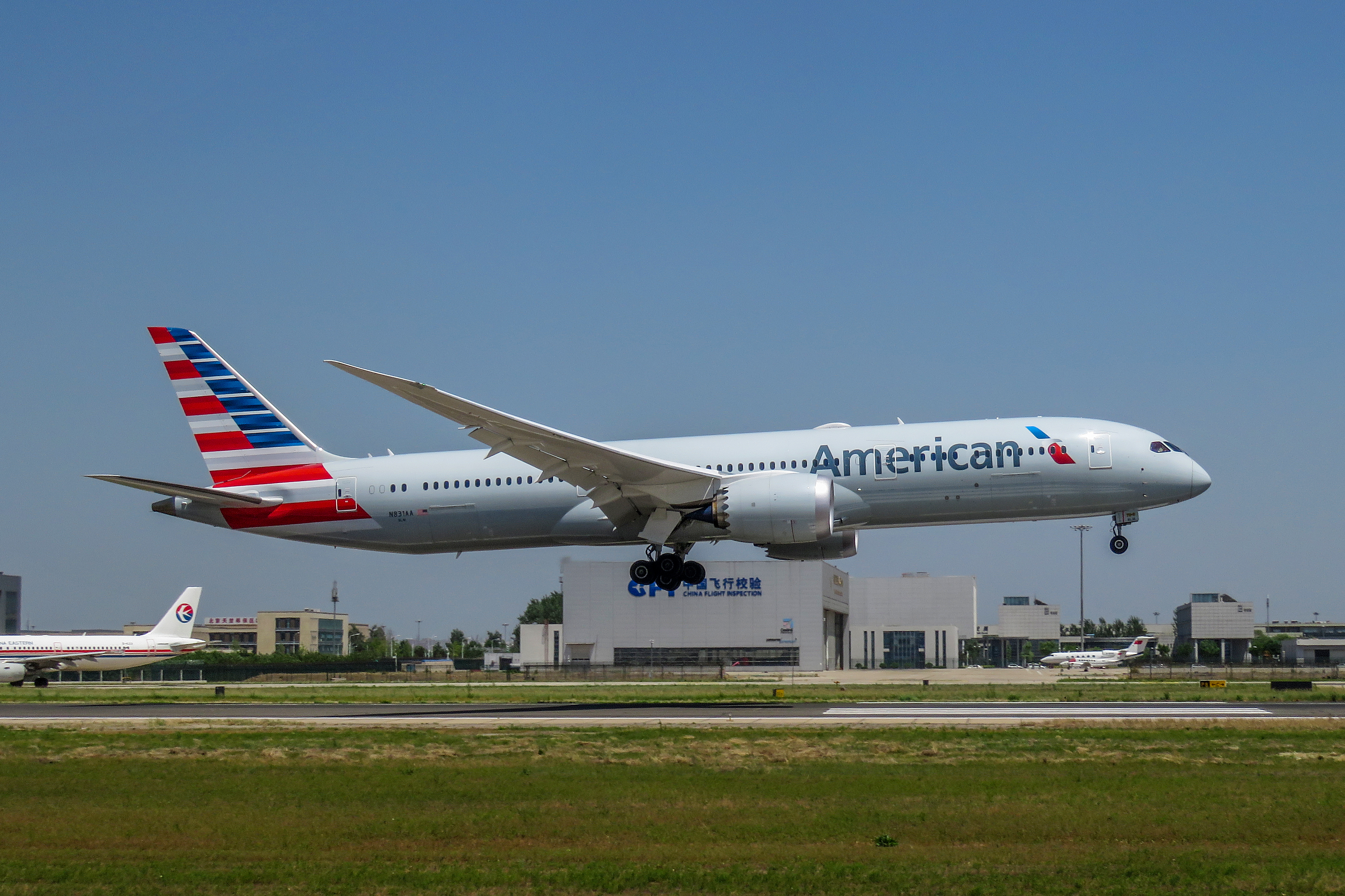
American Airlines 181 from LAX landing at Beijing Capital International Airport.

On March 16, 2017, Hainan Airlines launched non-stop service between Los Angeles and Chengdu. On March 22, 2017, Hainan Airlines launched non-stop service between Los Angeles and Chongqing.

On October 21, 2017, Hainan Airlines launched non-stop service between New York's John F. Kennedy International Airport (JFK) and Chongqing. On October 27, 2017, Hainan Airlines launched non-stop service between New York's John F. Kennedy International Airport (JFK) and Chengdu.

On November 5, 2017, American Airlines launched daily non-stop flight between Los Angeles and Beijing.

On December 7, 2017, Air China launched non-stop service between Shenzhen and Los Angeles.

=== 2018 expansion ===
On July 19, 2017, Delta Air Lines announced new service between Hartsfield-Jackson Atlanta International Airport and Shanghai Pudong International Airport starting in July 2018.

On October 22, 2018, Delta Air Lines announced it would seek DOT approval for direct service between Minneapolis-St. Paul International Airport and Shanghai beginning in June 2020 using an A350.

On November 2, 2018, United Airlines announced it would seek DOT approval for a second daily nonstop flight from its New York City/Newark hub to Shanghai, to begin in June 2020 using a Boeing 777-200.

=== 2019 expansion ===
On February 13, 2019, CAAC approved China Southern Airlines' application for direct service between Wuhan Tianhe International Airport and New York/JFK, to begin in June 2019.

== COVID-19 impacts and controversies from the 2020s ==
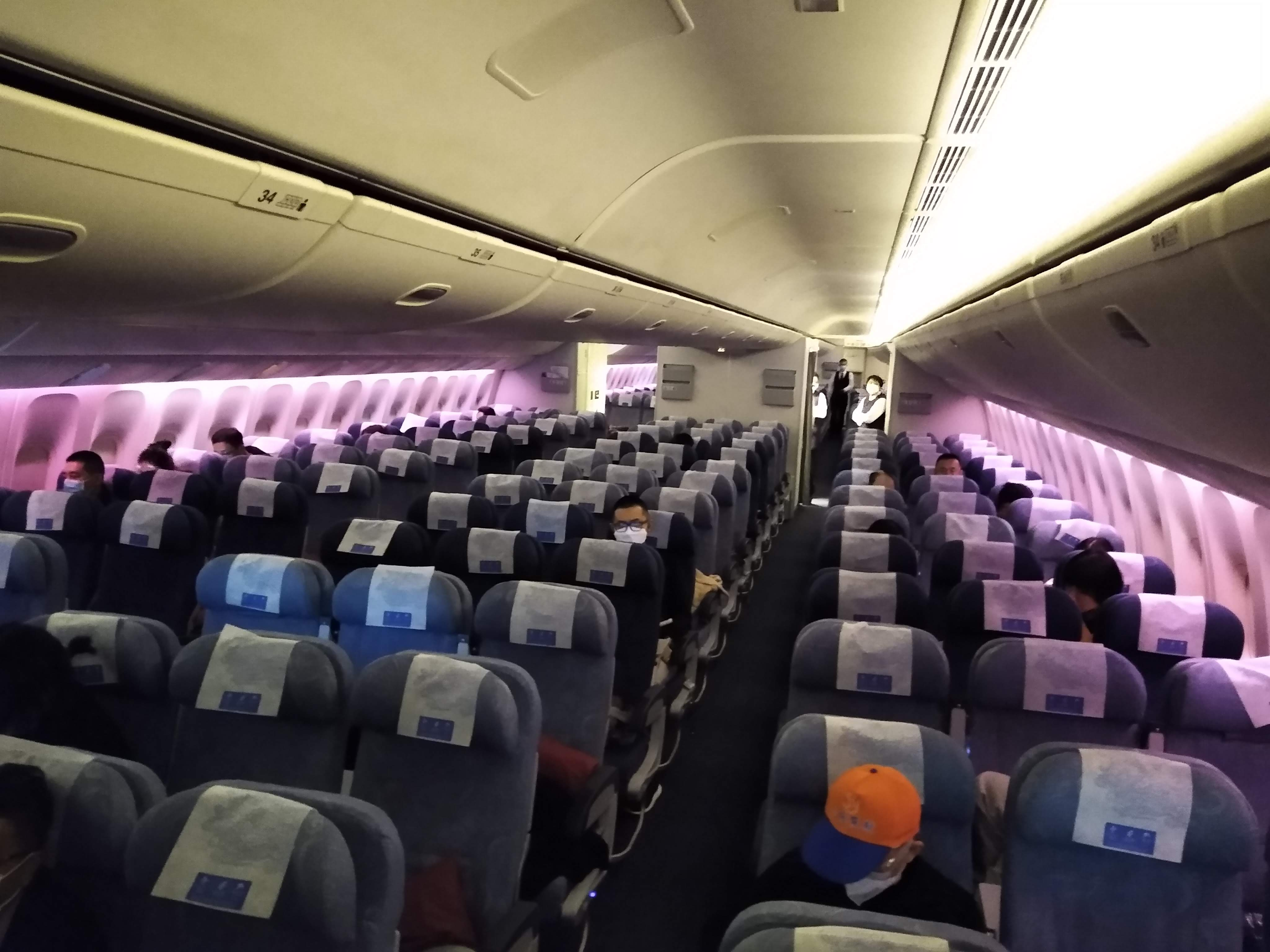
A nearly empty Air China flight from PEK to LAX amid the COVID-19 pandemic in mid-March 2020

The passenger air transportation demand between China and the United States were significantly decreased due to the COVID-19 pandemic outbreak in late January 2020. The US air carriers (American, Delta, and United) then announced the suspension of flights to China in early February, while Chinese air carriers (Air China, China Eastern, China Southern, Xiamen Airlines) continued to maintain limited passenger services between two countries. In Mid-February, there are only 20 passenger flights, operated by four Chinese air carriers scheduled per week, compared to 325 weekly flight before the pandemic. In March, as the pandemic hit the US and the essential travel demand from the US to China had relatively increased, weekly commercial flights operated by 4 Chinese airlines between two countries increased to 34, plus other private charter flights utilized by Chinese citizens in the US.

=== CAAC's Restrictions on China–U.S. Flights ===
On March 26, CAAC issued a notice ("Notice of March 26") that placed restrictions on the number of flights per week from/to China by airline and country. The pattern established by the notice was being called "Five-Ones" Policy, which allowed each Chinese airline to maintain one route to any specific country with no more than one flight per week; the foreign airlines are only allowed to maintain one route to China with no more than one weekly flight, on the basis of schedules approved by CAAC on March 12. The USDOT is unsatisfied with it since the "March 12 schedule" that "Five-Ones" policy was based does not include any US airlines. In early April, United Airlines announced its intention to resume passenger flights to China while Delta expected its flights to China can be resumed by May 31, all are subjected to be approved by China. The USDOT raised objections and concerns since those proposals were not approved by CAAC by the end of May, believing the (1) restrictions set by the "Five-Ones" policy are "beyond those contemplated in" 1980 Agreement, and (2) "creates an environment that affords Chinese carriers more favorable treatment than U.S. carriers, thereby denying U.S. carriers a 'fair and equal opportunity to compete'".

On May 22, USDOT issued the Order 2020-5-4 that imposed schedule filling requirements for Chinese airlines operating US flights. Chinese Foreign Ministry denounced this restriction on May 25; on the same day, CAAC submitted a letter to the USDOT, which urged DOT to revoke the Order and insisted on the position that the "Five-Ones" policy is not inconsistent with the 1980 Agreement since it "equally applies to all domestic and international air carriers". Other comments believe that it is one of the incarnation of the rising tensions of bilateral relationships spilling over into the aviation industry. Sichuan Airlines filed an application to USDOT on May 27 to seek resumption of its US flights, Hainan Airlines also seek US flight resumption.

=== USDOT Part 213 Order 2020-6-3 ===
On June 3, USDOT announced that under the CFR Part 213, all flight schedules filed by Chinese air carriers (CA, MU, CZ, and MF who currently in operation; 3U and HU/JD who seeks resumption of US flights) were being disapproved, taken into effect on June 16 but can be immediately effective upon approval from the US Presidents. On June 4, CAAC announced the cessation of the Five-One policy and airlines can increase to two flights to China per week if there are no passengers on their flights test positive for COVID-19 for 3 consecutive weeks. On June 15, USDOT announced that the previous restrictions were lifted and each country now agreed to allow four bilateral flights per week: CA, MU, CZ and MF who were currently in operation would continue to operate with one flight to the US per week; United and Delta will be able to have two flights to China per week under this new policy. Delta resumed 2-per-week Seattle – Shanghai Pudong flight starting June 25, and will operate Seattle – Shanghai and Detroit – Shanghai flights once per week from July; United will resume twice-per-week San Francisco – Shanghai Pudong flights starting June 8. All flights operated by US carriers will have a stopover at Seoul Incheon for a crew-switch to avoid the quarantine restrictions and travel restrictions to foreign-nationals of China.

On August 17, CAAC granted each United and Delta to increase frequency to four-weekly from previously two for they had qualified for additional flight frequencies pursuant to the terms set by the CAAC before. As a response, USDOT issued an order on Aug 18 that allows the increasing round-trip flights operated by four Chinese airlines that currently perform scheduled passenger services to the United States to eight weekly. United then announced it would increase SFO–PVG flights from 2 to 4 weekly starting Sep 4; Delta would increase the frequency of each SEA–PVG and DTW–PVG flights to 2 per week starting Aug 24.

American Airlines resumed twice a week DFW–PVG flights starting Nov 11, which lifted the total number of weekly flights to China by U.S. carriers to 10. However, David Short, the deputy assistant secretary for aviation and international affairs of USDOT, said the US was still "not satisfied" with that since the previous bilateral agreement on air route authority does not provide any provisions about the Pandemic.

On August 6, 2021, CAAC mandated a 40% capacity for 4 weeks on United Airlines 857 to Shanghai starting Aug 11 after it previously alleged five passengers tested positive for COVID-19 upon arrival on July 21, based on its "circuit breaker" policy. The USDOT on Aug 18 announced that it will impose identical capacity limits on four US-bound flights over four weeks operated by Chinese carriers - one each from Air China, China Eastern Airlines, China Southern Airlines, and Xiamen Airlines. The USDOT commented that CAAC's circuit breaker policy violates the bilateral agreements on air services and air carriers “have no means to independently verify positive test results alleged by Chinese authorities”.

Since December 2021, multiple US-China flights, operated by both Chinese and US carriers (20 UA flights, 14 DL flights, and 10 AA flights), were canceled by CAAC for the exceeding number of arrival passengers who tested positive based on its "circuit breaker" policy. USDOT on January 21, 2022, announced the suspension of 44 US-China flights operated by four Chinese carriers, in addition to the flights already canceled by CAAC. US-China flights operated by Chinese carriers have already been canceled by CAAC and are not included in DOT's scope of suspension. This means that there will be almost no flights from the US to China in entire February and March. In August and September 2022, CAAC cancelled 26 flights operated by American, Delta and United over COVID-19 cases, as the respond, USDOT suspended 26 flights operated by Xiamen, Air China, China Southern Airlines and China Eastern from September 5 to September 29.

In May 2022, Qin Gang - the Chinese ambassador to the US - announced that the weekly flights between China and the US would "soon be increased to 24 from 18" during the Indiana Global Economic Summit in response to questions about China's Zero-COVID policy. Shortly after, Air China temporarily resumed weekly Beijing – New York-JFK – Hohhot flights in June.

In a new COVID protocols from Chinese authorities published on November 11, 2022, it announce that the authorities will stop practicing "Circuit Breaker" mechanism for inbound international flights.

Beginning in December 2022, China Southern resumes weekly Guangzhou–New York-JFK flight by switching the route authority on one of its twice-per-week Guangzhou–Los Angeles flights.

==== Flight Recovery ====
On January 8, 2023, China eased its entry restrictions and no longer requires people entering the country to be quarantined but the rate of flight recovery remained slow.

United resumed nonstop operation for its SFO – PVG flights starting Jan 28, 2023. While Delta resumed nonstop operation for its China-bound flight starting March 3, 2023. Also in March 2023, American Airlines increased its DFW – PVG flights from twice per week to 4, making flights between China and the United States at the total weekly number of 12 for US carriers and 8 for Chinese carriers.

Due to the Russian invasion of Ukraine, US carriers are no longer able to use Russian airspace for flights to/from China, resulting difficulty operating flights especially from/to the US East Coast cities. According to Financial Times, US carriers are lobbying the US government not to grant Chinese carriers new flights due to the cost gap of flying over Russian airspace, unless Chinese carriers agree not to fly over Russia.

On May 3, 2023, USDOT issued the order that allows the quotas for the number of weekly flights operated by Chinese carriers increase to 12, replaced the quotas of 8 set back in August 2020. In the order, USDOT also comments that the normalization of the U.S.-China air transport market to be "balanced and incremental". Shortly after, USDOT issued notice on May 18, 2023, that approved flight applications filed by four Chinese carriers starting end of May 2023: Air China resumes once-per-week Beijing-Capital – New York-JFK CA981/982 service, China Eastern resumes once-per-week Shanghai-Pudong – Los Angeles MU583/586 service, China Southern increases its CAN – LAX services to twice-per-week, Xiamen Airlines adds the third XMN – LAX services. All of those newly added flights operated by Chinese carriers did not use Russian airspace en route.

On August 11, 2023, USDOT issued the Order 2023-8-10 that allows the quotas for the number of weekly flights operated by Chinese carriers increase from 12 to 18 starting September 1, and further increases to 24 starting October 29, as "Chinese government will agree to the same increase for American carriers". Given that that, Air China increased frequency of its PEK – LAX and PEK – JFK services. China Eastern increased frequency of its PVG – LAX services. China Southern increased frequency of its CAN – LAX services.

Subsequently, USDOT approved additional flight schedules filed by CA, MU, and CZ on Sep 27 based on the Order 2023-8-10: Air China would resume twice-per-week Beijing-Capital – San Francisco flights starting October 29; one additional PEK – JFK flight, while adding stopover at LAX on all of the JFK – PEK flight starting Nov 4, making up total of 8 weekly China-US services; China Eastern would resume twice-per-week Shanghai-Pudong – San Francisco flights, making up total of 7 weekly services; China Southern would resume twice-per-week Wuhan – San Francisco flights starting October 29, making up total of 6 weekly services.

In August 2023, United announced that it would resume the frequency of its SFO – PVG flights to daily starting October 1, and resumed the daily San Francisco – Beijing-Capital flights starting November. Delta announced on August 16 that it would resume daily SEA – PVG services and 3-per-week DTW – PVG services starting October 29. American also announced its DFW – PVG services would become daily starting January 2024.

On September 27, 2023, the Port Authority of Commonwealth of the Northern Mariana Islands (CNMI) filed an application to request CNMI to be exempt from USDOT's Part 213 Order 2023-8-10. In the application, CNMI Port Authority revealed that flights between China and CNMI was unlimited per 2007 Agreement until USDOT's Part 213 Order; it also stated that USDOT's orders did not consider the "public interests" in the broader sense, as CNMI' economy relies on tourists particularly from China - compared to mainland U.S. and other U.S. territories, and the proposed exemption will not affect the flight markets on China – mainland U.S. routes.

On October 27, 2023, USDOT issued the Order 2023-10-9 that allows the quotas for the number of weekly flights operated by Chinese carriers increase from 24 to 35 starting November 9. On November 8, USDOT approved the flight schedules filed by Chinese carriers: Air China to resume twice-per-week Beijing-Capital – Washington-Dulles – Los Angeles – Beijing-Capital CA817/818 service, plus increased frequency of PEK – LAX service; China Eastern to increase the frequency of its PVG – LAX services; China Southern to increase the frequency of its WUH – SFO services. In addition, Hainan Airlines to resume Beijing-Capital – Boston – Seattle – Beijing-Capital services at 3 times per week; Sichuan Airlines to resume Chengdu-Tianfu – Los Angeles services at twice a week.

On February 26, 2024, USDOT issued the Order 2024-2-21 that allows the quotas for the number of weekly flights operated by Chinese carriers increase from 35 to 50 starting March 31.

Hainan Airlines resumed once-per-week Chongqing – Seattle service starting May 16, 2024. United restored LAX – PVG services with 4-per-week frequency starting Aug 28 2024, and will increase frequency to daily starting end of October 2024.

On May 1, 2025, United launched Los Angeles – Beijing-Capital service, with 3-per-week frequency. On June 1, 2025, Delta resumed Los Angeles – Shanghai-Pudong service, with 3-per-week frequency.
