= Kharkiv KhAI-5 =

Soviet recon and light bomber

KhAI-5 / R-10 / PS-5
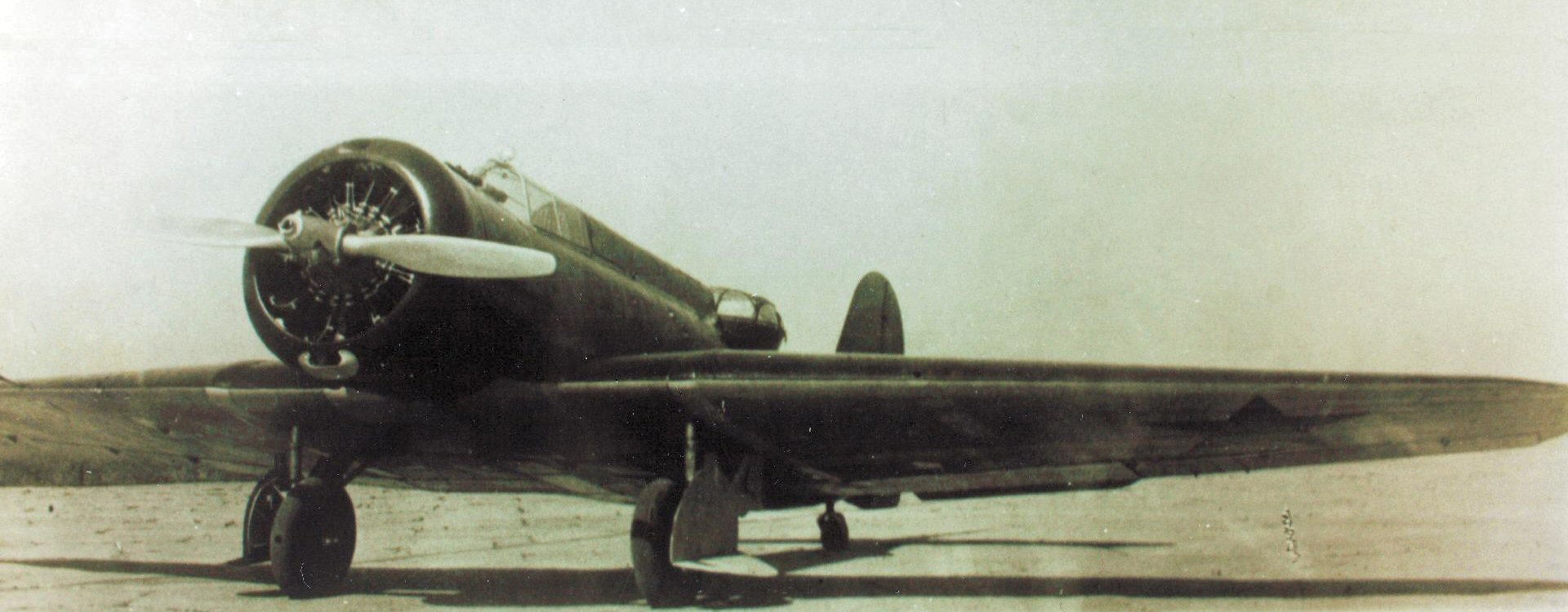

General information
- Type: Reconnaissance and light bomber monoplane
- National origin: Soviet Union
- Manufacturer: Kharkiv Aviation Institute, Kharkiv Aviation Factory
- Designer: Iosif Nyeman
- Primary user: Soviet Air Force
- Number built: 500+

History
- First flight: June 1936

The Kharkiv KhAI-5, (sometimes Neman R-10) was a Soviet reconnaissance and light bomber aircraft, designed in the mid-1930s in the Kharkiv Aviation Institute (KhAI, - in Ukrainian: ХАІ), under the direction of Iosif Nyeman (sometimes written as Neman).

== Development ==
The first prototype of the plane, with a factory designation KhAI-5 (ХАІ-5), flew in June 1936. Despite a lower performance, the aircraft won a contest against another reconnaissance plane design, the Kochyerigin R-9, and was accepted for a production with the military designation R-10 ('R' indicated razvyedchik meaning reconnaissance in Russian). It was a modern design for the time. 493 R-10s were manufactured in the Kharkiv and Saratov aviation plants by early 1940.

The first series showed some teething problems, which resulted in Iosif Nyeman being arrested by the NKVD on December 11, 1938 under the accusation of sabotage and espionage, a common accusation at the time.

In 1938 a variant, the KhAI-5bis was tested with an M-25E engine, achieving a speed of 425 km/h (264 mph). In 1938, the KhAI-52 ground attack aircraft, based on the R-10, was also developed. It was powered by a Shvetsov M-63 670 kW (900 hp) radial engine and armed with seven machine guns and 400 kg (880 lb) bombs. A production run of an experimental series of 10 aircraft was prepared, but it was cancelled with Nyeman's arrest.

Some production R-10s were fitted with more powerful Tumansky M-88, Shvetsov M-62 and M-63 engines. Over 60 aircraft, withdrawn from the Air Force, were used from 1940 as mail carriers by Aeroflot, under the designation PS-5 (Russian: ПС-5), with 3 passenger seats.

== Combat use ==
The aircraft entered service in the Soviet Air Force in 1937, replacing some Polikarpov R-5s. R-10s were first used in combat in the 1939 Soviet-Japanese Battle of Khalkhin Gol. R-10s were used in against Finland in the Winter War and World War II, but by this time they were outdated and suffered heavy losses, as did the rest of the Soviet Air Force. Many planes were destroyed on the ground. They were used as tactical reconnaissance aircraft, and, in need, also as light bombers. Later many were used as night bombers, to reduce losses from opposing fighters. The remaining R-10s were withdrawn from combat service in 1943 although two Finnish pilots claimed R-10s in 1944.

== Description ==
The aircraft was conventional in layout, with a low mounted, plywood-covered wooden cantilever wing. The fuselage was of semi-monocoque construction. The undercarriage retracted into the wings. The crew consisted a pilot and an observer/rear gunner in a turret with a single machine gun. In the observer compartment's floor there was an AFA-13 camera for reconnaissance duties. Between the crew compartments there were fuel tanks and a vertical bomb bay. The maximum bomb load was 300 kg (660 lb) (6 × 50 kg (110 lb) or 10 × 25 kg (55 lb) bombs). The plane was powered by various variants of the Shvetsov M-25 and related M-63 radial engines, a development of the Wright R-1820 built under licence, which spun an all-metal two-bladed Hamilton Standard variable-pitch propeller.

== Operators ==
Soviet Union

- Soviet Air Force
- Aeroflot

== Variants ==
- KhAI-5bis - Improved R-10/KhAI-5, one example flown early 1939.
- KhAI-51 alternative designation for KhAI-5bis
- KhAI-52 - Production version of KhAI-51. Ten ordered but production cancelled.
- R-10 - Production version of KhAI-5
- PS-5 - Decommissioned aircraft used by Aeroflot.

== Specifications ==
Data from Gunston.

General characteristics

- Crew: 2
- Length: 9.3 m (30 ft 6 in)
- Wingspan: 12.2 m (40 ft 0 in)
- Wing area: 26.8 m^{2} (288 sq ft)
- Empty weight: 1,823 kg (4,019 lb)
- Gross weight: 2,515 kg (5,545 lb)
- Fuel capacity: 260 kg (573 lb) fuel + 30 kg (66 lb) oil
- Powerplant: 1 × Shvetsov M-25 (license-built Wright SGR-1820-F-3 Cyclone) 9-cylinder air-cooled radial piston engine, 531 kW (712 hp)
- Propellers: 2-bladed Hamilton Standard two-pitch propeller

Performance

- Maximum speed: 350 km/h (220 mph, 190 kn) at sea level

388 km/h (241 mph) at 2,500 m (8,202 ft)

- Landing speed: 125 km/h (78 mph)
- Range: 1,450 km (900 mi, 780 nmi)
- Service ceiling: 7,700 m (25,300 ft)
- Time to altitude: 1,000 m (3,300 ft) in 2 minutes 24 seconds

5,000 m (16,000 ft) in 12 minutes

- Take-off distance: 250 m (820 ft)
- Landing distance: 230 m (755 ft)

Armament

- Guns:
- 2 x fixed forward firing 7.62 mm (0.300 in) ShKAS machine-guns in the forward top decking
- 1 x manually aimed ShKAS machine-gun in the rear turret
- Bombs: 6 x 50 kg (110 lb) FAB-50 bombs in internal bays

== See also ==
Aircraft of comparable role, configuration, and era

- DAR 10
- Heinkel He 70
- Northrop Delta
- PZL.23 Karaś
- Vultee V-11

Related lists

- List of interwar military aircraft
- List of aircraft of World War II
- List of military aircraft of the Soviet Union and the CIS
