= Warbirds ASz-62 IR =

- Type: Aircraft engine
- National origin: Czech Republic
- Manufacturer: Warbirds-engines (Cesky znalecky institut s.r.o.)
- Developed from: Shvetsov ASh-62

The Warbirds ASz-62 IR is a Czech aircraft engine, based on the Shvetsov ASh-62 and produced by Warbirds-engines (Cesky znalecky institut s.r.o.) of Prague for use in warbirds and homebuilt aircraft.

The company appears to have gone out of business by 2014.

== Design and development ==
The ASz-62 IR engine is a nine-cylinder four-stroke, radial, 1,823 cu in (29,874 cc) displacement, air-cooled, direct-drive, gasoline engine design, with a mechanical gearbox reduction drive. It employs dual magneto ignition and produces 1,000 hp (746 kW) at 2200 rpm, with a compression ratio of 6.4:1.

== Specifications (ASz-62 IR) ==
Data from Tacke

=== General characteristics ===
- Type: Nine-cylinder, four-stroke radial aircraft engine
- Bore: 155.5 mm (6.1 in)
- Stroke: 174.5 mm (6.9 in)
- Displacement: 1,833 cu in (30,037 cc)
- Length: 1,380 mm (54.3 in)
- Diameter: 1,328 mm (52.3 in)
- Dry weight: 591 kg (1,302.9 lb)

=== Components ===
- Fuel type: gasoline
- Cooling system: air
- Reduction gear: mechanical gearbox

=== Performance ===
- Power output: 1,000 hp (746 kW)
- Compression ratio: 6.4:1

== See also ==
Related lists

- List of aircraft engines
