= Polikarpov I-16 =

Soviet 1930s monoplane fighter aircraft

I-16
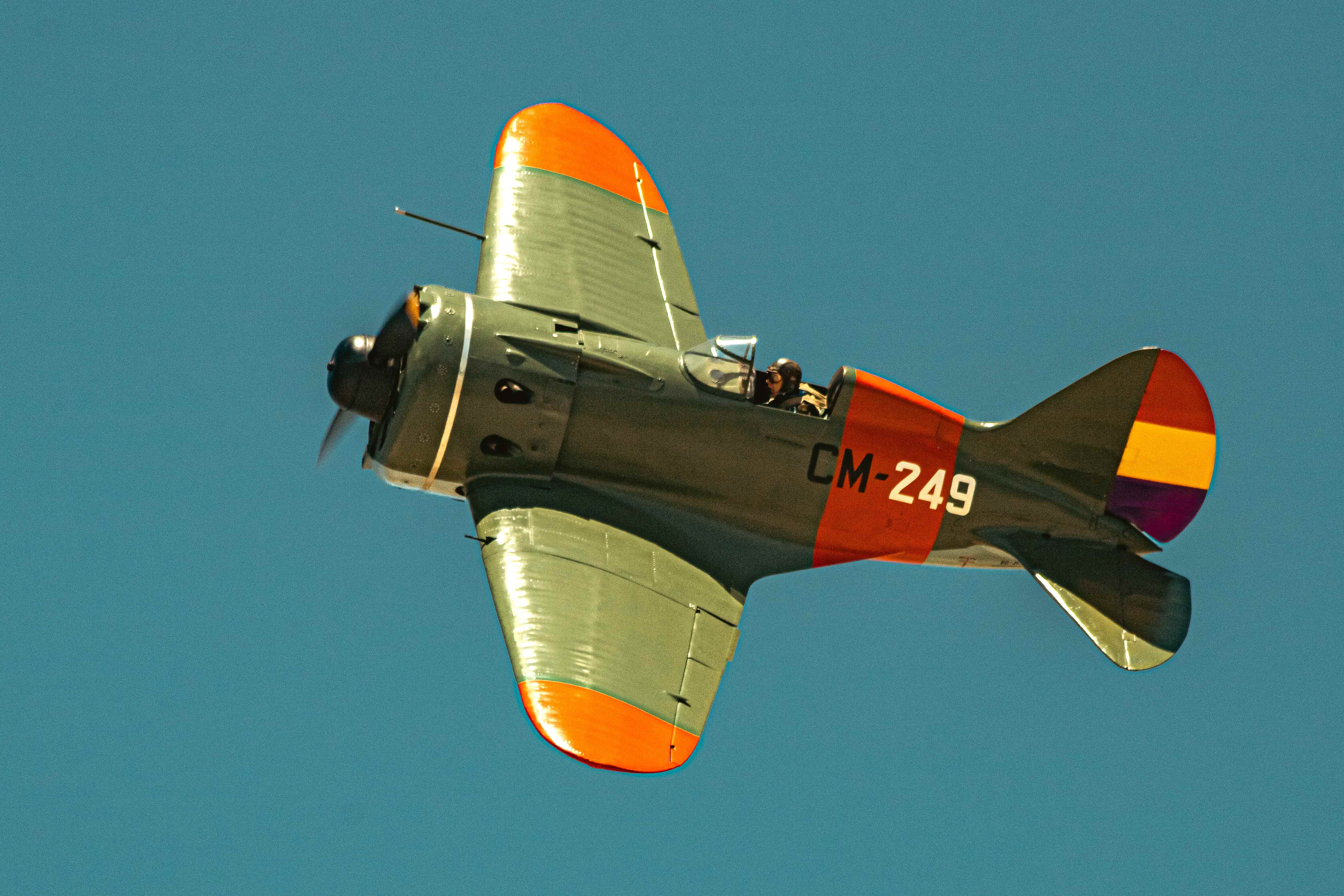
- Polikarpov I-16 flying over Cuatro Vientos airfield at the FIO exhibition

General information
- Type: Fighter
- National origin: Soviet Union
- Manufacturer: Plant No. 21 (Gorky), Plant No. 39 (Moscow), Plant No. 153 (Novosibirsk), Plant No. 458 (Rostov-on-Don/Baku), (Spain)
- Designer: N. N. Polikarpov Design Bureau
- Primary users: Soviet Air Force Spanish Republican Air Force; Chinese Nationalist Air Force
- Number built: 10,292 (6,848 fighters and 3,444 trainers)

History
- Manufactured: November 1933 – 1942
- Introduction date: March 1935
- First flight: 30 December 1933 (TsKB-12)
- Retired: 1945 (Soviet Air Force), 1953 (Spanish Air Force)
- Developed into: Polikarpov I-180

The Polikarpov I-16 (Russian: Поликарпов И-16) is a Soviet single-engine single-seat fighter aircraft. It is a low-wing cantilever monoplane fighter with retractable landing gear, and was the first such aircraft to attain operational squadron status. It "introduced a new vogue in fighter design". The I-16 was introduced in the mid-1930s and formed the backbone of the Soviet Air Force at the beginning of World War II. The diminutive fighter, nicknamed "Ishak" or "Ishachok" ("donkey" or "burro") by Soviet pilots, figured prominently in the Second Sino-Japanese War, the Battle of Khalkhin Gol, Winter War and the Spanish Civil War – where it was called the Rata ("rat") by the Nationalists or Mosca ("fly") by the Republicans. The Finns called the aircraft Siipiorava "(flying squirrel)".

== Design and development ==
While working on the Polikarpov I-15 biplane, Nikolai Nikolaevich Polikarpov began designing an advanced monoplane fighter. It featured cutting-edge innovations such as retractable landing gear and a fully enclosed cockpit, and was optimized for speed with a short, stubby fuselage, and a Wright R-1820 radial engine in a NACA cowling. The aircraft is small, light and simple to build.

Full-scale work on the TsKB-12 prototype began in June 1933, and the aircraft was accepted into production on 22 November 1933, a month before it took to the air. The TsKB-12 was of mixed construction, using a wooden monocoque fuselage and wings employing a KhMA chrome-molybdenum steel alloy wing spar, dural ribs and D1 aluminum alloy skinning on the center and leading edges, with the remaining portions of the wings fabric-covered. Another modern feature were the ailerons which ran along almost the entire trailing edge of the wing and also operated as flaps (in the manner of more modern flaperons) by drooping 15°. The cockpit was covered by a 40-centimetre-wide (16 in) canopy which featured an Aldis-type tubular gun sight which could slide back and forth on runners fitted with rubber bungee cords. A 225 L (59.4 US gal) fuel tank was fitted directly in front of the cockpit. The main landing gear is fully retractable by a hand crank. The armament consisted of a pair of 7.62×54mmR (0.30 in) ShKAS machine guns in the wings, mounted on the outboard side of the main gear and 900 rounds of ammunition.

These features were proposed at first by Andrei Tupolev; however, the NII VVS (Air Force Scientific Test Institute) was more concerned about the stresses a typical combat aircraft was subjected to in combat, and initially considered the risk too great. However, TsAGI, with the help of the 3rd Design Brigade under the leadership of Pavel Sukhoi and Aleksandr Putylov, eventually convinced NII VVS that what was being proposed was not only feasible, but would enhance the aircraft's performance.

The TsKB-12 was designed for the Wright Cyclone SR-1820-F-3 9-cylinder radial engine (rated at 529 kW/710 hp); a license to build this engine under the supervision of the OKB-19 Shvetsov design bureau in the Soviet Union was being negotiated. As the license was not yet approved, Polikarpov was asked to settle for the less powerful M-22 (Soviet-built version of the Gnome-Rhone Jupiter 9ASB, which itself was a licensed version of the Bristol Jupiter VI) with 358 kW (480 hp). This was deemed acceptable because the projected top speed still exceeded 300 km/h (185 mph).

The M-22-powered TsKB-12 first took to the air on 30 December 1933 with the famous Soviet test pilot Valery Chkalov at the controls. The second TsKB-12, with a Cyclone engine and three-bladed propeller, flew in January of the following year. Initial government trials in February 1934 revealed very good maneuverability, but the aircraft did not tolerate abrupt control inputs. Thus the TsKB-12 was deemed dangerous to fly and all aerobatics were forbidden. The M-22 version was preferred due to the vibration of the Cyclone-powered aircraft. Pilots commented early on about the difficulty of climbing into the cockpit, a trait that persisted through the I-16's service life. Before continuing test flights the designers had to answer the question of spin behavior. Wind tunnel testing suggested that the TsKB-12, with its short tail, would enter an unrecoverable spin, but real-life trials were necessary to confirm this. Since Cyclone engines were rare, it was decided to risk the M-22 prototype for this purpose. On 1 and 2 March 1934, Chkalov performed 75 spins and discovered that the aircraft had very benign stall behavior (dipping a wing and recovering without input from the pilot when airspeed increased) and intentional spins could be easily terminated by placing the controls in the neutral position. The stories of vicious spin behavior of the I-16 perpetuated in modern literature is unfounded (perhaps extrapolated from Gee Bee experience). In fact, the I-16's stablemate, the biplane Polikarpov I-153, exhibited much worse spin characteristics.

Service trials of the new fighter, designated I-16, began on 22 March 1934. The M-22 prototype reached 359 km/h (223 mph). The pioneering presence of a complex, triple-strut manually retracted main landing gear design was prone to jamming and required considerable strength from the pilot, who directly operated the rearmost strut's upper end, moved with a manually turned jackscrew running spanwise within the wing structure, to "slide" outwards and inwards on each side to respectively get the main gear retracted and extended, with the main strut (the forward-most of the trio) needing to shorten its length during its retraction to fit the mainwheel into the lower fuselage, performed by the middle-location strut's geometric arrangement and pivot locations. Most of the test flights were performed with the gear extended. On 14 April 1934, the Cyclone prototype was damaged when one of the landing gear legs collapsed while it was taxiing. On 1 May 1934, the M-22 prototype participated in the flyover of Red Square. Approximately thirty I-16 Type 1 aircraft were delivered, but were not assigned to any VVS fighter squadron. Most pilots who flew the I-16 Type 1 for evaluation purposes did not find the aircraft to have many redeeming characteristics. Regardless of pilot opinion, much attention was focused on the Cyclone-powered aircraft and the M-25 (the license-built Cyclone).

The third prototype with a Cyclone engine incorporated a series of aerodynamic improvements and was delivered for government trials on 7 September 1934. The top speed of 437 km/h (270 mph) no longer satisfied the Air Force, who now wanted the experimental Nazarov M-58 engine and 470 km/h (290 mph). Subsequently, the M-22-powered version entered production at Factory 21 in Nizhny Novgorod and Factory 39 in Moscow. Because it was the fourth aircraft produced by these factories, it received the designation I-16 Type 4. Aircraft fitted with these new engines required a slightly changed airframe, including armor plating for the pilot and changes to the landing gear doors (particularly, the hinged lower mainwheel door) to allow for complete closure.

The M-25 fitted I-16, the I-16 Type 5, featured a new engine cowling which was slightly smaller in diameter and featured nine forward-facing, radially-set shuttered openings to control cooling airflow, a redesigned exhaust with eight individual outlet stubs, and other changes. The M-25 was rated at 474 kW (635 hp) at sea level and 522 kW (700 hp) at 2,300 m (7,546 ft). Due to the poor quality of the canopy glazing, the I-16 Type 5 pilots typically left the canopy open or removed the rear portion completely. By the time the Type 5 arrived, it was the world's lightest production fighter (1,460 kg/3,219 lb), as well as the world's fastest, able to reach speeds of 454 km/h (282 mph) at altitude and 395 km/h (245 mph) at sea level. While the Type 5 could not perform the high-G maneuvers of other fighters, it possessed superior speed and climb rates, and had extremely responsive aileron control, which gave it a very good roll rate, which led to precision maneuvers in loops and split-Ss.

A total of 10,292 single-seat aircraft were produced between 1935 and 1942; the number of two-seat trainer variants produced varies between 843 and 3,189.

== Operational history ==
Initial service experience revealed that the ShKAS machine guns had a tendency to jam. This was the result of the guns being installed in the wings upside-down to facilitate the fit. The problem was addressed in later modifications. Evaluations from pilots confirmed the experience with prototypes. Controls were light and very sensitive, abrupt maneuvers resulted in spins, and spin behavior was excellent. An aileron roll could be performed in under 1.5 seconds (roll rate over 240 degrees/second). The machine guns were fired via a cable and the required effort, coupled with sensitive controls, made precision aiming difficult. The rear weight bias made the I-16 easy to handle on unprepared airfields because the aircraft was rather unlikely to flip over the nose even if the front wheels dug in.

The I-16 was a difficult fighter to fly. The pilots had poor visibility, the canopy tended to become fouled with engine oil, and the moving portion was prone to slamming shut during hard maneuvers, which caused many pilots to fix it in the open position. The front section of the fuselage, with the engine, was too close to the centre of gravity, and the pilot's cockpit too far to the rear. The Polikarpov had insufficient longitudinal stability and it was impossible to fly the aircraft "hands off".

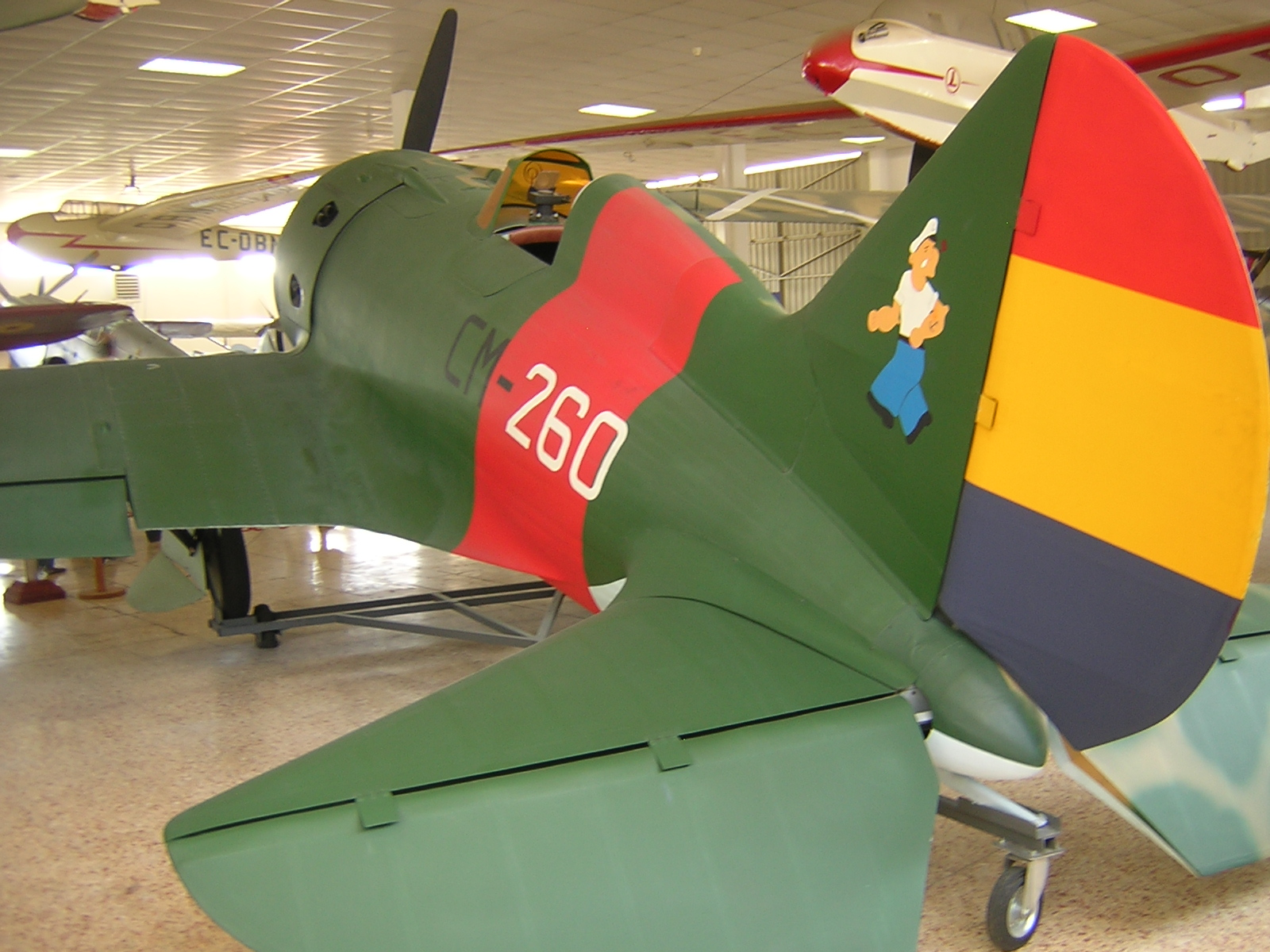
I-16 in Spanish Republican colors with "Popeye mascot"

=== Spanish Civil War ===
At the start of the Spanish Civil War in 1936, Republican forces pleaded for fighter aircraft. After receiving payment in gold, Joseph Stalin dispatched around 475 I-16 Type 5s and Type 6s. The first I-16s appeared in Spanish skies in November 1936. The Polikarpov monoplanes had their baptism of fire on 13 November 1936, when twelve I-16s intercepted a Nationalist bombing raid on Madrid. Soviet pilots claimed four air victories and two German Heinkel He 51 pilots were killed. The Soviets suffered losses too; the group commander collided with an enemy aircraft and another I-16 pilot crash landed. The Polikarpovs immediately began dominating the enemy Heinkel He 51 and Arado Ar 68 biplanes and remained unchallenged until the introduction of the Messerschmitt Bf 109. The arrival of the newest Bf 109Bs and the overwhelming numerical superiority of Nationalist fighters were the primary cause of the heavy I-15 and I-16 combat losses suffered throughout 1937. A number of aviation publications called the new Soviet fighter a "Boeing" due to the incorrect assumption that it was based on the Boeing P-26's design. The Nationalists nicknamed the stubby fighter Rata (Rat), while the Republicans affectionately called it Mosca (Fly).

Combat experience showed that the I-16 had deficiencies; several aircraft were lost after structural failure of the wings, which was quickly remedied by reinforced structures. Heavy machine gun bullets could sometimes penetrate the armored backrest, and fuel tanks occasionally caught fire in spite of being protected. The hot Spanish summers required the addition of oil radiators, and dust adversely affected the life of the engines. Although some aircraft accumulated up to 400 hours of flying time, the average life of an I-16 was 87 days, of which one sixth was spent on maintenance. The biggest complaint in service was the light armament of only two 7.62 mm (0.30 in) machine guns. This was urgently addressed with the Type 6 which added a third ShKAS in the bottom of the fuselage. The four-gun Type 10 was nicknamed "Super Mosca" or simply "Super". The total number of I-16s delivered to Spain from 1936 to 1938 amounted to 276. When the war ended on 1 April 1939, 187 had been lost in Spain: 112 lost in combat, one shot down by anti-aircraft fire, eleven destroyed on the ground, one force-landed and 62 lost in accidents.

=== China, the Far East, and battles at Khalkhin Gol ===
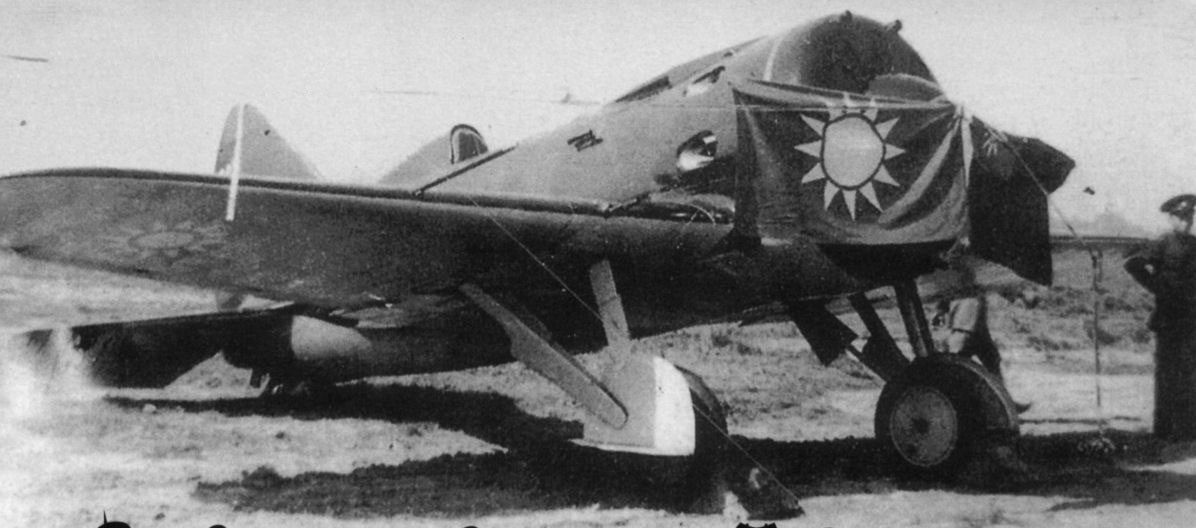
I-16 Type 5 with Chinese insignia, flown by Chinese pilots and Soviet volunteers

Between October 1937 and September 1939 the USSR delivered 885 aircraft (rising to 1,250 by 1941), including 216 Polikarpov I-16s, predominately Type 5s and Type 10s. At first the Soviet pilots would have to fly the aircraft over 1,500 miles across China to get them to their destination of Lanzhou, however this was a risky journey and so future batches of aircraft would be disassembled and transported to Hami (closer to Lanzhou), before final assembly and delivery to Lanzhou. The first I-16s were delivered in November 1937, however rushed training of the Chinese pilots meant many were lost to crashes. In Chinese service the I-16 became known as the "Lastochka" or "Swallow". In the early years of the war the I-16 was a capable fighter, however from 1939 onwards its performance was deemed to be lacking in comparison to newer fighters.

A number Chinese aces flew the I-16; among them Lo Ying-Teh who in 1938 shot down Japanese unit leader Lt Ryohei Ushioda's A5M2 in his I-16 Type 5. Another ace to fly the I-16 was Liu Chi-Sheng who achieved 3 of his 10 kills while flying the I-16 Type 5, along with another shared kill.

Another 250 I-16 Type 10s were supplied to China. This model added a second set of 7.62 mm (0.30 in) ShKAS machine guns, armor behind the pilot, and had a slightly upgraded 560 kW (750 hp) M-25 engine. In 1939, of the 500 I-16s deployed to the fighting at Nomonhan, approximately 112 were lost during the battles of Khalkhin Gol, of which 88 were destroyed in aerial combat, primarily against the all-metal Nakajima Ki-27 Japanese fighters. During test trials in Russia of a captured Ki-27, the aircraft proved superior to the Soviet I-152 (I-15bis), I-153, and the I-16 in aerial combat, as well as having a faster take-off and lower landing speed, requiring shorter airstrips than the I-16, which needed 270 metres (890 ft) to stop and 380 metres (1,250 ft) for take-off.

Further attempts were made to upgrade the firepower of the aircraft using 20 mm (0.79 in) ShVAK cannons, making the I-16 one of the most heavily armed fighters of the period, able to fire 28 rounds of ammunition in three seconds. Pilots loved the results, but the cannons were in short supply, and only a small number of the I-16 Type 12, 17, 27, and 28 were built. The Chung 28 is an unlicensed I-16 built from the spare parts of I-16s provided to the Nationalists, delivered in 1941 and did not include upgraded cannons. The cannons adversely affected performance, with 360° turn time increasing from fifteen seconds in the Type 5 to eighteen seconds. The Type 24 replaced the skid with a tailwheel and featured the much more powerful 670 kW (900 hp) Shvetsov M-63 engine. The Type 29 replaced two of the ShKAS guns with a single 12.7 mm (.50 in) UBS. Ten Type 17 fighters were supplied to the Chinese Air Force where on 20 May 1940, they effectively shot down a C5M scout-attack plane and three G3M bombers during the Battle of Chongqing.

Types 18, 24, 27, 28, and 29 could be fitted to carry RS-82 unguided rockets. The first successful use of air-to-air missiles in air combat was on August 20, 1939. A Ki-27 was hit by an RS-82 rocket launched from a distance of about a kilometer. The shot was fired by Captain N. Zvonarev.

A 1939 government study found the I-16 had exhausted its performance potential. The addition of armor, radio, battery, and flaps during the aircraft's evolution exacerbated the rear weight distribution problems to the point where the aircraft required considerable forward pressure on the stick to maintain level flight and at the same time developed a tendency to enter uncontrolled dives. Extension and retraction of the landing flaps caused a dramatic change in the aircraft's attitude. Accurate gunfire was difficult.

=== Soviet Union ===
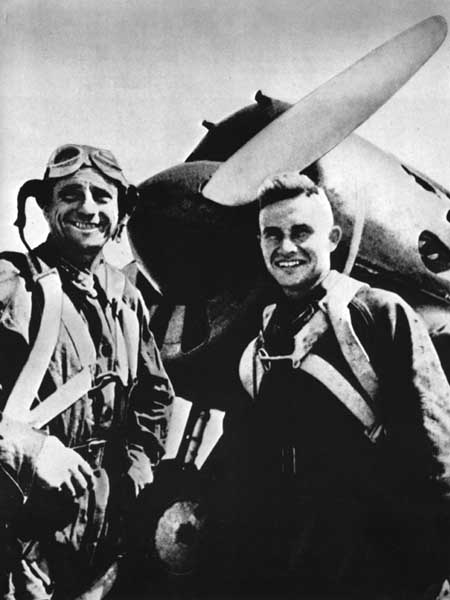
VVS pilots at Khalkhyn Gol in front of their I-16 in August 1939.

The pilots nicknamed the aircraft Ishak (Russian: Ишак, Donkey/Hinny) because it was similar to the Russian pronunciation of "I-16" ("ee-shestnadtset"). When Operation Barbarossa erupted on 22 June 1941, 1,635 of 4,226 VVS aircraft were I-16s of all variants, fielded by 57 fighter regiments in frontier areas. The main assault delivered by the Luftwaffe's Luftflotte 2 (in support of Wehrmacht Army Group Centre) was directed against the Soviet Western Special Military District, that deployed 361 (424 according to other sources) I-16s. During the early phase of the campaign the I-16 bases were the main targets for the German aircraft and after 48 hours of combat, of the 1,635 Polikarpov monoplanes in service on 21 June 1941, only 937 were left. By 30 June the number of I-16s in western front line units had dropped to 873, including 99 that required repairs. To stem the Luftwaffe aerial assault several I-16 pilots adopted the taran tactic and sacrificed their lives, ramming German aircraft.

Its main opponent in the sky in 1941 was the German Messerschmitt Bf 109. The I-16 was slightly more maneuverable than the early Bf 109s and could fight the Messerschmitt Bf 109E, or Emil, on equal terms in turns. Skilled Soviet pilots took advantage of the Polikarpov's superior horizontal maneuverability and liked it enough to resist the switch to more modern fighters. The German aircraft, however, outclassed its Soviet opponent in service ceiling, rate of climb, acceleration and, crucially, in horizontal and diving speed, due to better aerodynamics and a more powerful engine. The main versions of the I-16 had a maximum speed of 450–470 km/h (279–291 mph), while the Bf 109E had a maximum speed of 560–570 km/h (347–353 mph), and the more streamlined Bf 109F Friedrich could hit 615–630 km/h (372-390plus mph). German pilots held the initiative and could decide if they wanted to chase their opponents or attack them from above and behind and then gain altitude for a new attack. Meanwhile, Polikarpovs could only defend each other by forming a defensive circle or via horizontal maneuverability.

Moreover, in terms of armament, Messerschmitts had a slight edge on the I-16. The Emil carried two wing-mounted 20mm MG FF cannons and two synchronized 7.92 mm MG-17s with a weight of a one-second salvo of 2.37 kg, while the most common version of the I-16—armed with just two synchronized and two wing-mounted 7.62 ShKAS—could deliver 1.43 kg of bullets each second. Finally, the ammunition storage on a Messerschmitt exceeded that of the I-16, carrying 1,000 rounds for each machine gun (plus sixty drum-housed rounds for each cannon), while the Polikarpov carried just 450 rounds for each ShKAS gun.

Around half of all produced I-16s were still in service in 1943, when they were finally replaced.

Specially modified I-16s were used in the Zveno parasite aircraft experiments using the Tupolev TB-3 as a mothership. These I-16s carried two 250 kg bombs for dive bombing. This was more than double the bomb load an I-16 could take off with under its own power. Once the bombs were dropped, they could perform as normal I-16s, and could re-attach to the TB-3 for the return journey.

The Luftwaffe was known to have captured some I-16 and UTI-4 two-seat trainers (two of which were marked with the Stammkennzeichen codes DM+HC and DM+HD) and flown from the Erprobungstelle Rechlin central Luftwaffe test facility by Kampfgeschwader 200 (KG 200). The Luftwaffe was not the only air force able to test its fighters against the I-16; the Japanese captured a few I-16s as well, and the Romanian Air Force also got one when a Soviet pilot defected. The Finnish Air Force (FAF) captured some I-16s (along with several other Soviet types). During the Winter War and the Continuation War, the Finns captured six I-16s and one I-16UTI. Two of the captured I-16s and I-16UTIs were put back into flying condition and flight tested.

== Variants ==
There is considerable disagreement in literature on features of particular I-16 variants. This list is based on the following references.

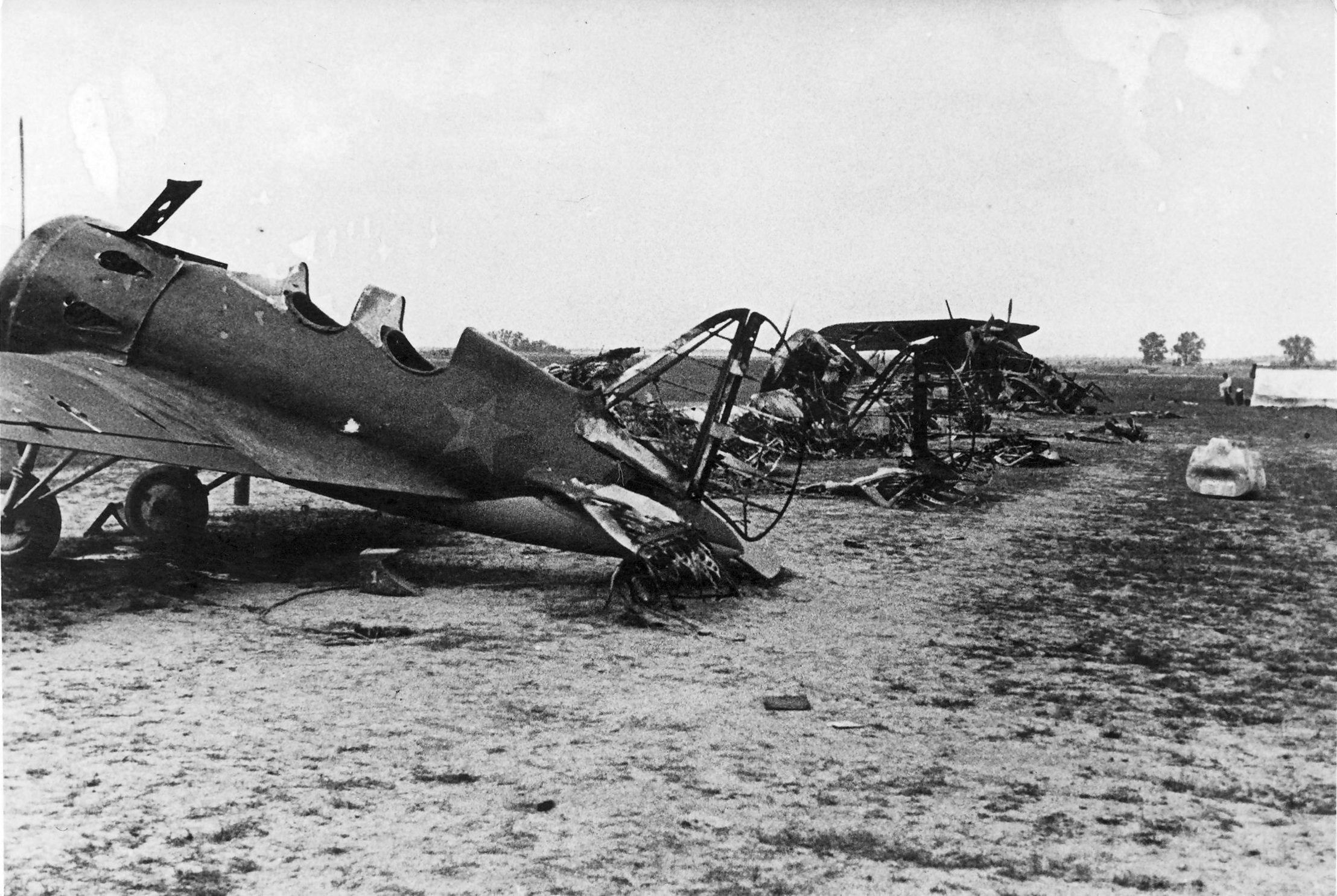
Polikarpov UTI-4, a two seater training version of the I-16 Soviet fighter, sitting damaged on the ground following an attack by German forces during Operation Barbarossa.

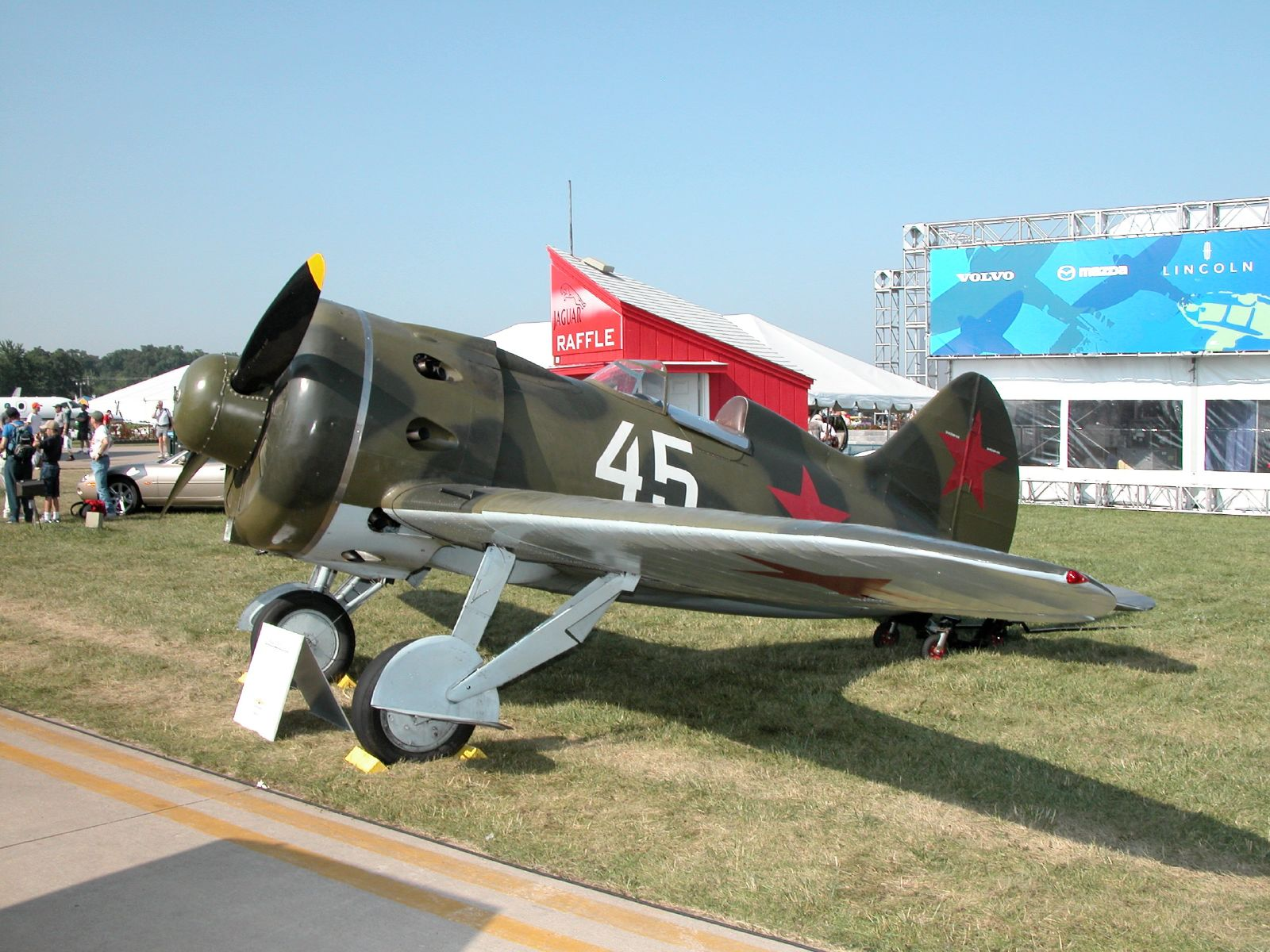
Polikarpov I-16 at EAA AirVenture Oshkosh 2003

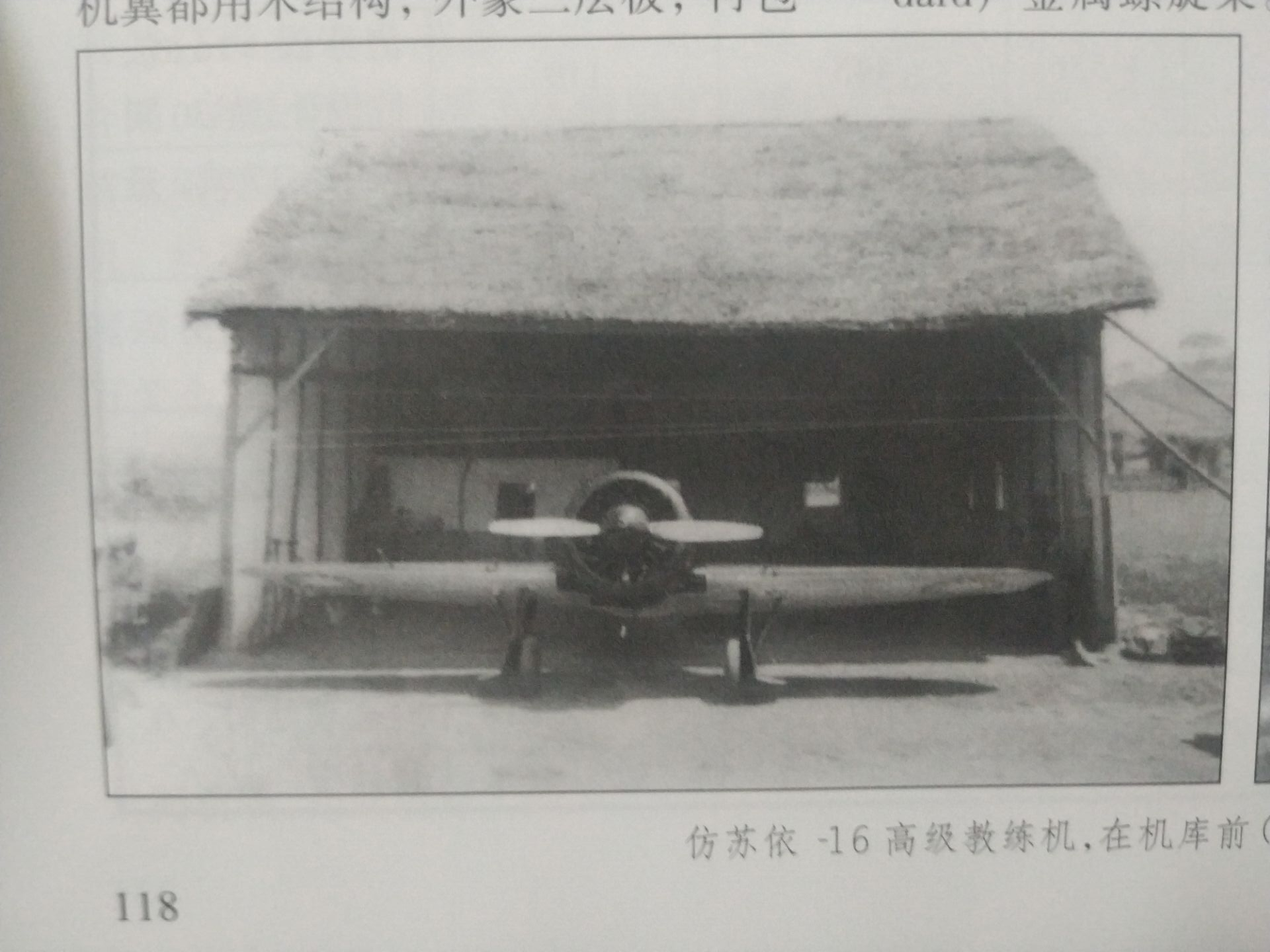
Chung 28A in front of the hangar. China 1939.

TsKB-12
First prototype, M-22 engine, 336 kW (450 hp), two unsynchronized ShKAS machine guns in the wings with 900 rpg.
TsKB-12bis
Second prototype, Wright SGR-1820-F-3 Cyclone engine, 533 kW (715 hp)
TsKB-12P (I-16P)
Prototype armed with two ShVAK cannon in the wings, 150 rpg.
TsKB-18
Ground attack prototype with M-22 engine and armored cockpit. Armed with four ShKAS or PV-1 machine guns and 100 kg (220 lb) of bombs. Two additional Type 5s were fitted with six ShKAS machine guns of which four could decline to 20° for ground strafing.
TsKB-29 (SPB)
Pneumatically-operated landing gear and flaps, Wright Cyclone engine, armament of two ShKAS machine guns, used as a high-speed dive bomber in the Zveno project
I-16 Type 1
Pre-production series, M-22 engine with 358 kW (480 hp).
I-16 Type 4
First production version, M-22 engine.
I-16 Type 5
Type 4 with a streamlined and tapered engine cowling, Shvetsov M-25 engine with 522 kW (700 hp). 2 prototypes tested with M-62 engine as well. Mass-produced.
I-16 Type 6
Shvetsov M-25B engine, 545 kW (730 hp). Weight reduction down to 1383 kg.
I-16 Type 10
Four ShKAS machine guns (two synchronized in the fuselage and two in the wings), windscreen replaced the sliding canopy, could be fitted with retractable skis for winter operations, M-25B engine with 560 kW (750 hp). Hispano-Suiza-built aircraft were powered by the Wright Cyclone R-1820-F-54 engine.
I-16 Type 12
Version of I-16 Type 5 with 2 ShKAS machine guns and 2 ShVAK cannons.
I-16 Type 16
Type 10 with synchronized ShVAK 12.7mm prototypes. Only three were built, all in January 1939, with serial numbers 16211-16213. They passed factory trials and were delivered to the VVS for military trials.
I-16 Type 17
Type 10 with two ShKAS machine guns and two ShVAK cannon, rubber tail wheel, M-25V engine with 560 kW (750 hp). Some aircraft were fitted with an additional 12.7 mm (0.5 in) Berezin UB machine gun for strafing.
I-16 Type 18
Type 10 with Shvetsov M-62 engine producing 620 kW (830 hp), with a two-speed supercharger and a variable-pitch propeller. Capable of carrying two 100 L (26 US gal) underwing fuel tanks.
I-16 Type 19
Identical to the Type 10, except for the replacement of their wing-mounted ShKAS machine guns with Savin–Norov machine guns; the propeller-synchronized ShKAS were not replaced. Only three aircraft were built in this configuration, all in January 1939. They had serial numbers 19211-19213. They were first used as test platform for the new gun and then delivered to the VVS as I-16SN. They saw action during the Winter War.
I-16 Type 20
This designation was first applied to four prototypes built in February 1939 at Factory 21 and armed with Savin–Norov (SN) machine guns synchronized to fire through the propeller. This type was however rejected in August 1939, and then the designation reused for the first I-16 version (otherwise the same as the type 10) capable of carrying drop tanks. These 93 L (25 US gal) tanks were designated PSB-21. Eighty aircraft of this specific type were delivered. Additionally, all I-16 types built after January 1940 could use these drop tanks.
I-16 Type 21 and Type 22
These were planned to have four synchronized machine guns all firing through the propeller. Type 21 was to use only ShKAS, while type 22 was supposed to use a mixture of ShKAS and SN machine guns. Both types however existed only on paper; no aircraft of these types went into service.
I-16 Type 23
Type 10 additionally armed with RS-82 rockets; 35 were built starting in May 1939. Further production of this type was cancelled in August 1939.
I-16 Type 24
Four ShKAS, landing flaps replaced drooping ailerons, tailwheel added, second cockpit door added on the starboard side, Shvetsov M-63 engine with 670 kW (900 hp).
I-16 Type 27
Type 17 with an M-62 engine.
I-16 Type 28
Type 24 with two ShKAS and two ShVAK.
I-16 Type 29
Two synchronized ShKAS in the nose and a single 12.7 mm (0.50 in) UBS in the bottom of the fuselage; it had no guns in wings which were reserved for ground attack weapons. Three rocket racks were mounted in each wing. Additionally, starting in 1941, the external fuel tank hardpoint was changed so that it became multipurpose: it could carry the new type of drop tank, PLBG-100, or a FAB-100 bomb. Wartime photographs from the summer of 1941 show two configurations: one with 6 RS-82 rockets and two FAB-100 bombs and another with four RS-132 rockets.
I-16 Type 30
Re-entered production in 1941–42, M-63 engine.
I-16TK
Type 10 with a turbocharger for improved high-altitude performance, reached 494 km/h (307 mph) at 8,600 m ( 28,200 ft), did not enter production.
UTI-1
Two-seat trainer version of Type 1.
UTI-2
Improved UTI-1 with fixed landing gear.
UTI-4 (I-16UTI) also known as I-16 Type 15
Two-seat trainer version of Type 5, most with fixed landing gear. This model was built in significant numbers, approximately 3,400 were produced.
Chung 28A
Chinese product version, base on the I-16 Type 6 with 712hp Wright R-1820-F3 engine (Maximum speed 455 km/h), armed with two Browning machine gun. total 30 built (3 fighter & 30 Trainer).

== Operators ==
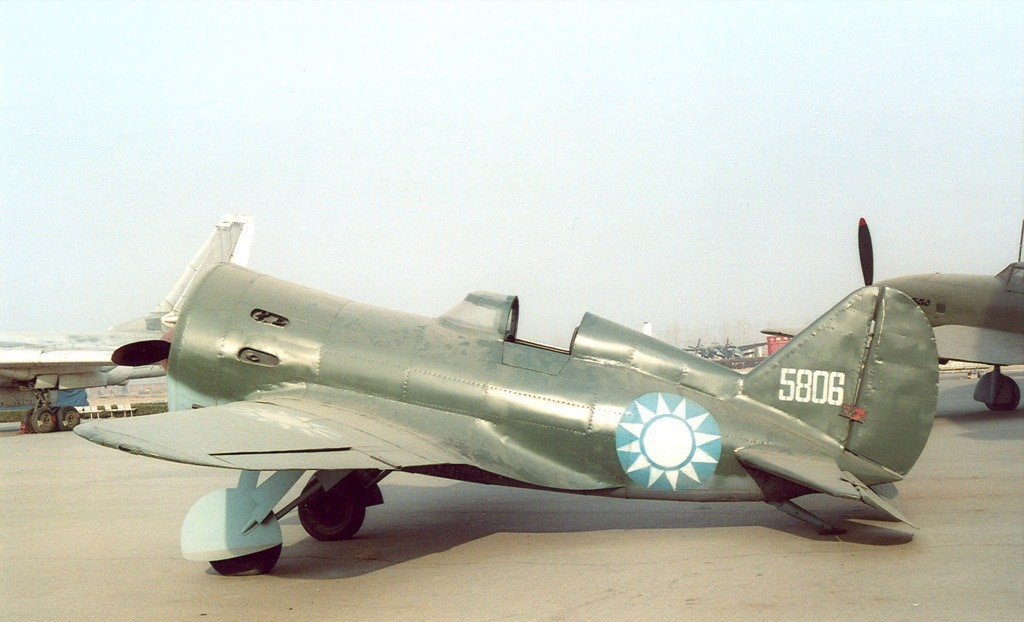
Chinese I-16 (China Aviation Museum)

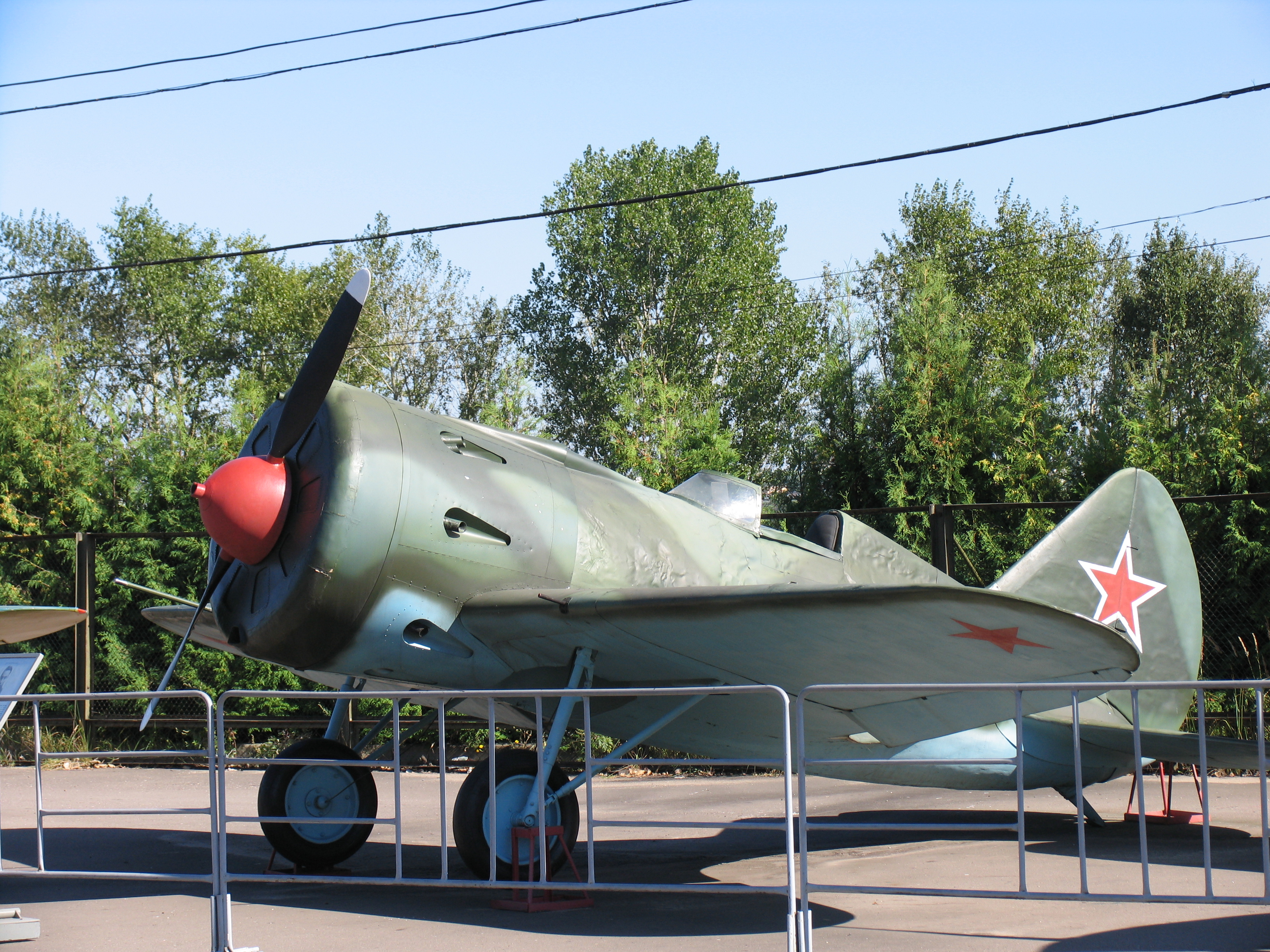
Aircraft on display at a museum in Moscow

China

- Chinese Nationalist Air Force

Nazi Germany

- Luftwaffe operated captured aircraft

Finland

- Finnish Air Force operated captured aircraft.

Mongolia

- Mongolian People's Army Aviation operated one I-16 used for training

Poland

- Polish Air Force operated one I-16 (1 Pułk Lotnictwa Myśliwskiego) and two UTI-4 aircraft (15 Samodzielny Zapasowy Pułk Lotniczy and the Techniczna Szkoła Lotnicza.

Romania

- Royal Romanian Air Force one captured aircraft, one I-16 was captured near Dorohoi in 1941.

Soviet Union

- Soviet Air Forces
- Soviet Naval Aviation

Spanish Republic

- Spanish Republican Air Force

Spanish State

- Spanish Nationalist Air Force operated I-16 and UTI-4 aircraft captured from the Spanish Republican Air Force, returned by French government and 30 built in Jerez de la Frontera. I-16s were still operated in 1952.
  - Group 1-W
  - 26th Group
  - Morón Fighter School

== Surviving aircraft ==
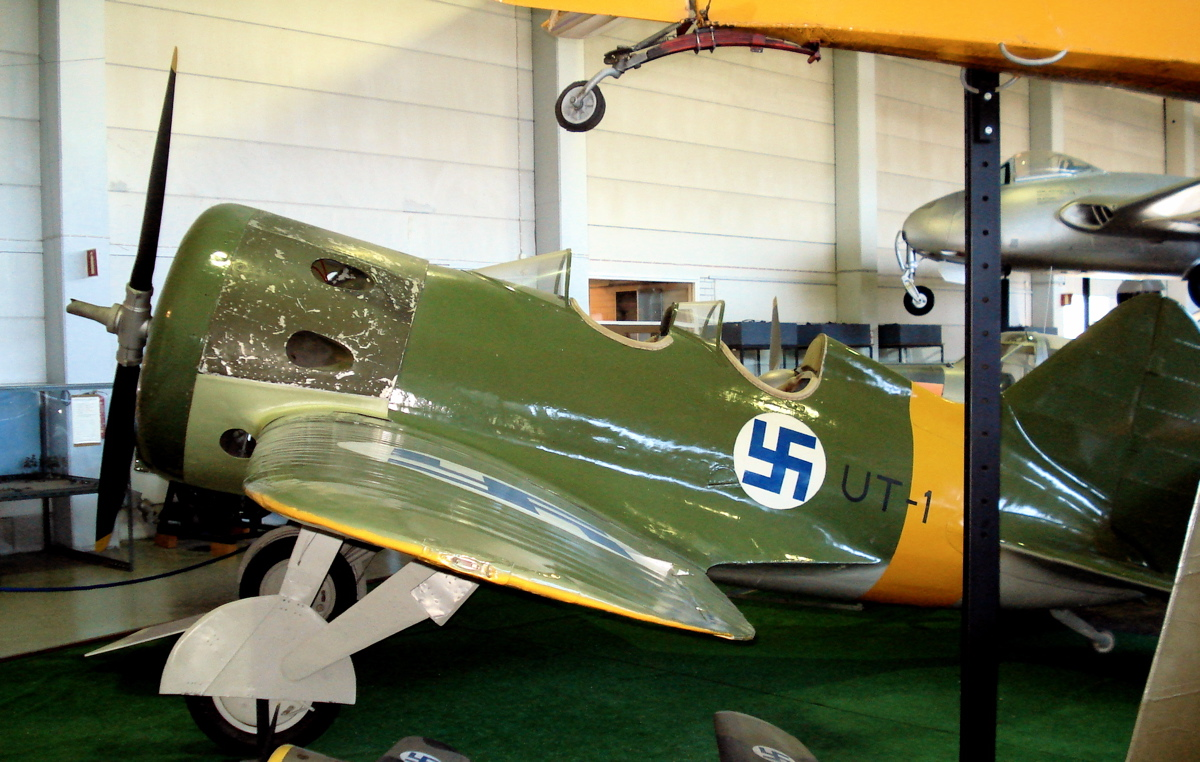
Two-seat I-16 UTI trainer version, with Finnish markings on display in the Finnish Aviation Museum in Vantaa, Finland

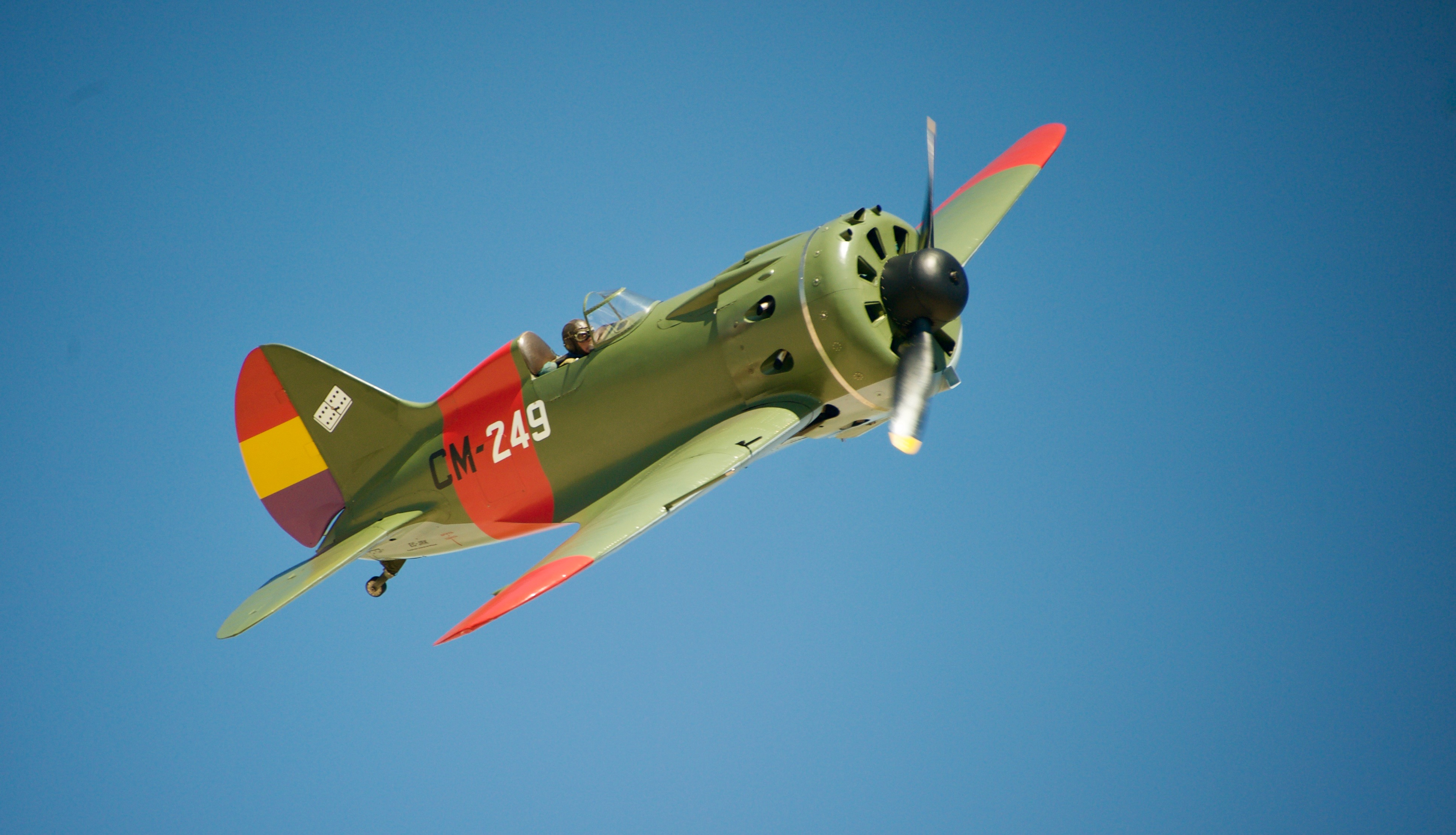
I-16 in Spanish Republican colours, property of The Infante de Orleans Foundation

Commencing in 1993, New Zealand pilot and entrepreneur Sir Tim Wallis' Alpine Fighter Collection organised the restoration of six I-16s and three I-153s, found in Russia, to an airworthy condition by the Soviet Aeronautical Research Institute (Sibnia) in Novosibirsk. The flight of the first restored aircraft (I-16 9) took place in October 1995. Once restored the aircraft were transported by rail to Vladivostok and from there shipped via Hong Kong to New Zealand. This project was completed in 1999 when the third and final I-153 arrived in New Zealand. In addition a seventh I-16 was later restored for American collector Jerry Yagen.

=== China ===
- Unknown – I-16 on static display at the Chinese Aviation Museum in Datangshang. It is believed to be a replica incorporating original parts.

=== Finland ===
- UT-1 – I-16 UTI-4 on static display at the Finnish Aviation Museum in Vantaa, Uusimaa.

=== Germany ===
- 2421319 – I-16 Type 24 airworthy with a private owner in Germany as D-EPRN.

=== Russia ===
- 2421234 – I-16 Type 24 airworthy with a private owner in Russia as RA-1561G.
- 2821395 – I-16 Type 28 on static display at the Central Naval Museum in Saint Petersburg.
- Replica – I-16 on static display at the Museum of the Great Patriotic War in Moscow.
- Unknown – I-16 on static display at the Central Air Force Museum in Monino.

=== Spain ===
- 2421039 – I-16 Type 24 airworthy at the Fundación Infante de Orleans in Madrid as EC-JRK.
- Replica – I-16 on static display at the Museo del Aire in Madrid.

=== United States ===
- 2421014 – I-16 Type 24 airworthy at the Flying Heritage Collection in Everett, Washington as N7459.
- 2421028 – I-16 Type 24 airworthy at the Military Aviation Museum in Virginia Beach, Virginia as N1639P.
- 2421645 – I-16 Type 24 under restoration to airworthy at Fantasy of Flight as N30425.

== Specifications (I-16 Type 24) ==
3-view drawing of Polikarpov I-16

Data from Istoriia konstruktskii samoletov v SSSR do 1938

General characteristics

- Crew: One
- Length: 6.13 m (20 ft 1 in)
- Wingspan: 9 m (29 ft 6 in)
- Height: 3.25 m (10 ft 8 in)
- Wing area: 14.5 m^{2} (156 sq ft)
- Airfoil: TsAGI R-II (16% at root)
- Empty weight: 1,490 kg (3,285 lb)
- Gross weight: 1,941 kg (4,279 lb)
- Powerplant: 1 × Shvetsov M-63 9-cylinder supercharged air-cooled radial engine, 820 kW (1,100 hp)
- Propellers: 2-bladed variable-pitch propeller

Performance

- Maximum speed: 489 km/h (304 mph, 264 kn) at 3,000 m (9,800 ft)
- Range: 700 km (430 mi, 380 nmi) with drop tanks
- Service ceiling: 9,700 m (31,800 ft)
- Rate of climb: 14.7 m/s (2,890 ft/min)
- Time to altitude: 5,000 m (16,000 ft) in 5 minutes 48 seconds
- Wing loading: 134 kg/m^{2} (27 lb/sq ft)
- Power/mass: 0.43 kW/kg (0.26 hp/lb)

Armament

- 2 × fixed forward-firing 7.62 mm (0.300 in) ShKAS machine guns in upper cowling
- 2 × fixed forward-firing 7.62 mm (0.300 in) ShKAS machine guns in the wings/ 20 mm (0.787 in) ShVAK cannons (type-28)
- 6 × unguided RS-82 rockets or up to 500 kg (1,100 lb) of bombs

== See also ==
- Zveno project

Aircraft of comparable role, configuration, and era

- Brewster F2A Buffalo
- Boeing P-26 Peashooter
- CAC Boomerang
- Fiat G.50
- Macchi MC.200
- Messerschmitt Bf 109
- Mitsubishi 1MF10
- Nakajima Ki-27
- Reggiane Re.2000
- Seversky P-35

Related lists

- List of interwar military aircraft
- List of aircraft of World War II
- List of aircraft of the Spanish Republican Air Force
