= Shvetsov ASh-62 =

Soviet radial piston aircraft engine

ASh-62
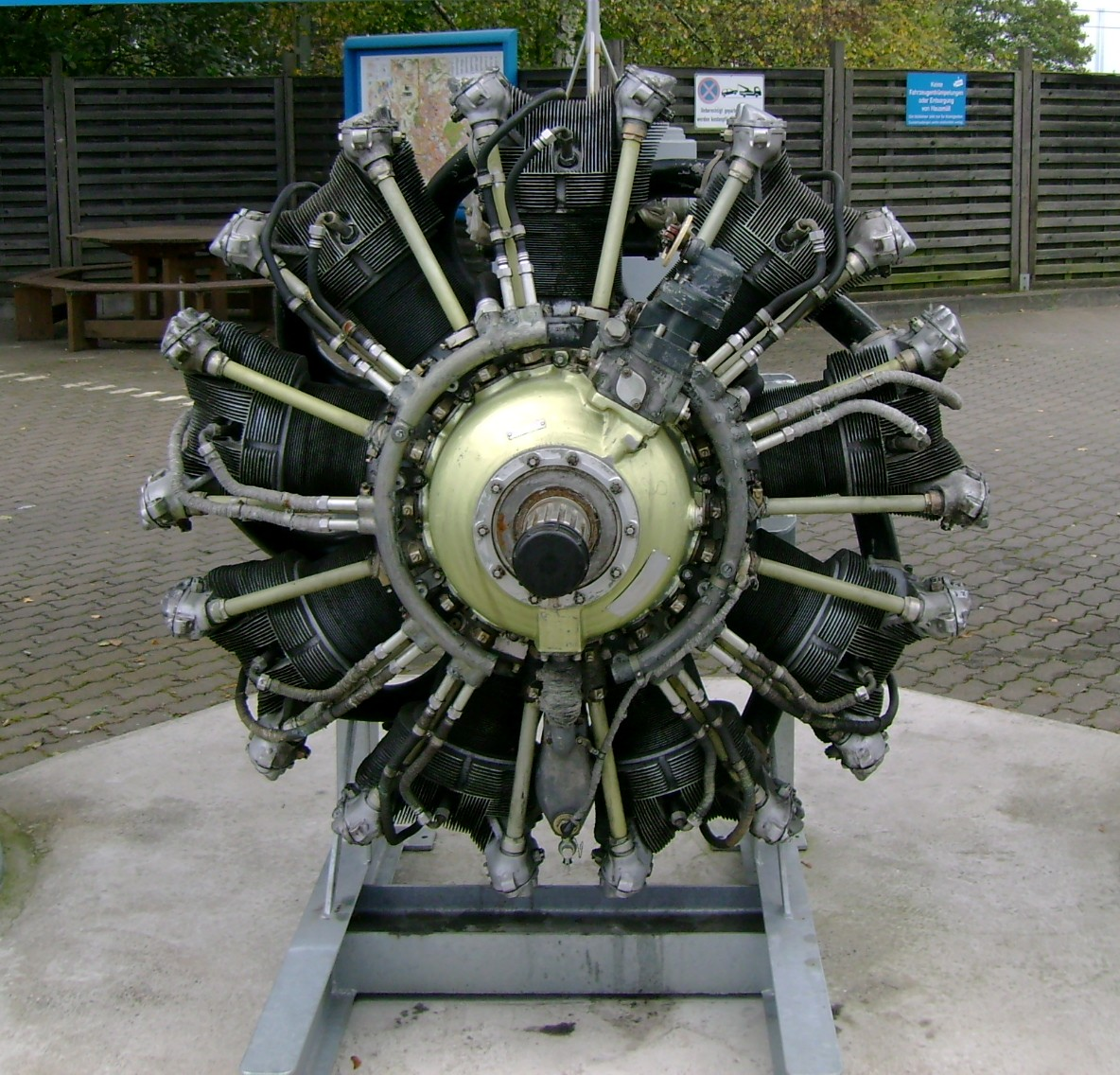
- Type: Radial engine
- Manufacturer: Shvetsov
- First run: 1937
- Major applications: Antonov An-2, Polikarpov I-153, Polikarpov I-16, Lisunov Li-2
- Number built: 40,361
- Developed from: Shvetsov M-25
- Developed into: Shvetsov ASh-82

The Shvetsov ASh-62 (Russian: Швецов АШ-62, designated M-62 before 1941) is a nine-cylinder, air-cooled, radial aircraft engine produced in the Soviet Union. A version of this engine is produced in Poland as the ASz-62 and the People's Republic of China as the HS-5.

== Design and development ==
The ASh-62 was a development of the Wright R-1820 Cyclone that had been built in Russia under licence as the Shvetsov M-25, the main improvements including a two-speed supercharger and a more efficient induction system. Power was increased from the Cyclone's 775 hp to 1,000 hp. First run in 1937, licensed versions are still in production by WSK "PZL-Kalisz" in Poland (as of 2017). The Ash-62 was also produced in China. It is estimated that 40,361 were produced in the USSR.

Polish-built ASz-62IR engines (Polish transcription of Russian name), by WSK "PZL-Kalisz" in Kalisz, are compatible with FAR-33 requirements. Further developments in Poland are the K9-AA, K9-BA and K9-BB engines, with take-off power of 1178 hp (860 kW), indicated power 698 kW. From 2015 the ASz-62IR-16E was produced with electronic fuel injection, offering greater power and the possibility of running on commercial automotive fuel.

The M-63 was an improved version of the M-62 with the power output increased to 821 kW (1,100 hp) at 2,300 rpm for takeoff and 671 kW (900 hp) at 2,200 rpm at 4,500 m (14,800 ft) due to a higher compression ratio of 7.2:1 and a higher redline.

== Applications ==
- Antonov An-2
- Antonov An-6
- Beriev Be-4
- Lisunov Li-2

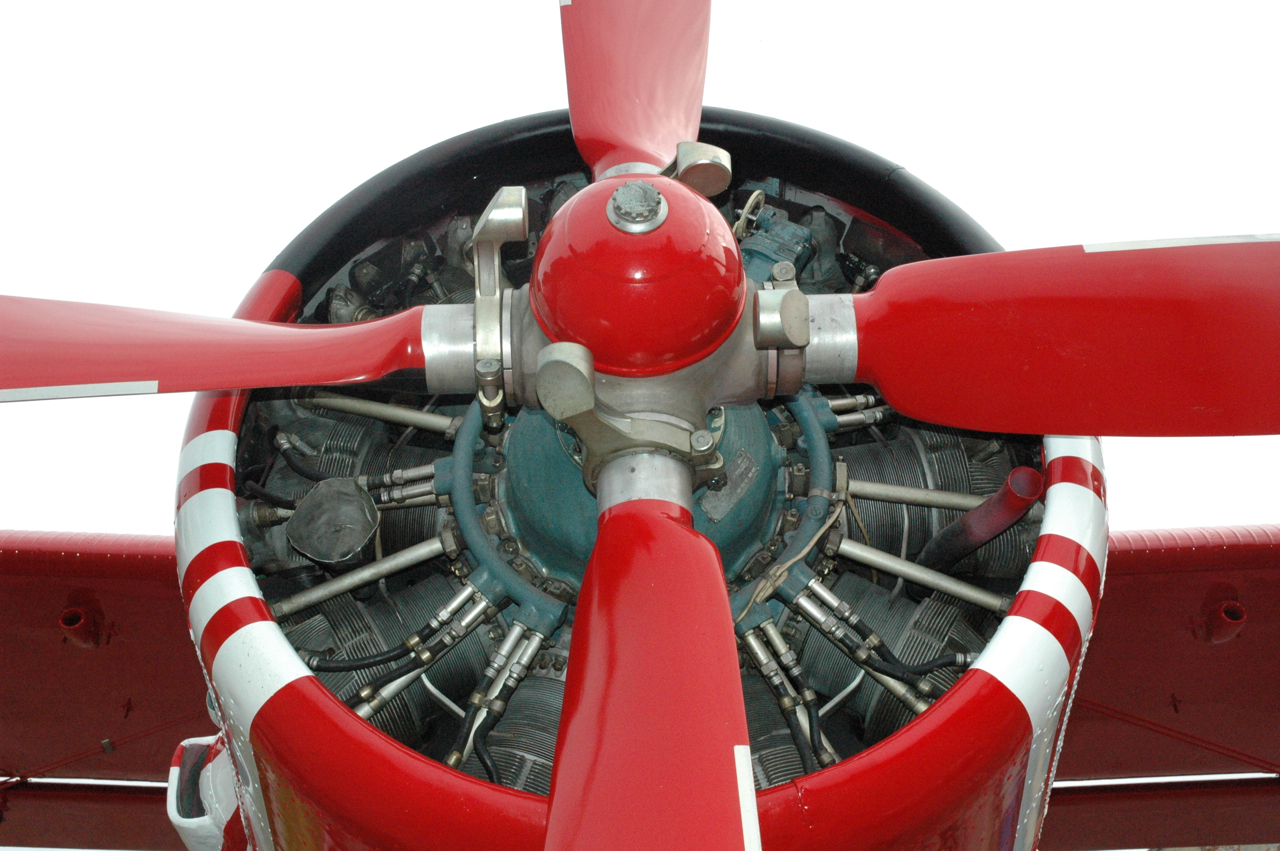
ASz-62 installed in an Antonov An-2 (Cowling installed)

- Kharkiv KhAI-5
- Polikarpov I-153
- Polikarpov I-16
- PZL-106 Kruk (some variants)
- PZL-Mielec M-18 Dromader
- PZL M-24 Dromader Super (K-9AA)
- Sukhoi Su-2 (prototype)
- Sukhoi Su-12
- VL Myrsky (one prototype)

== Specifications (M-62) ==
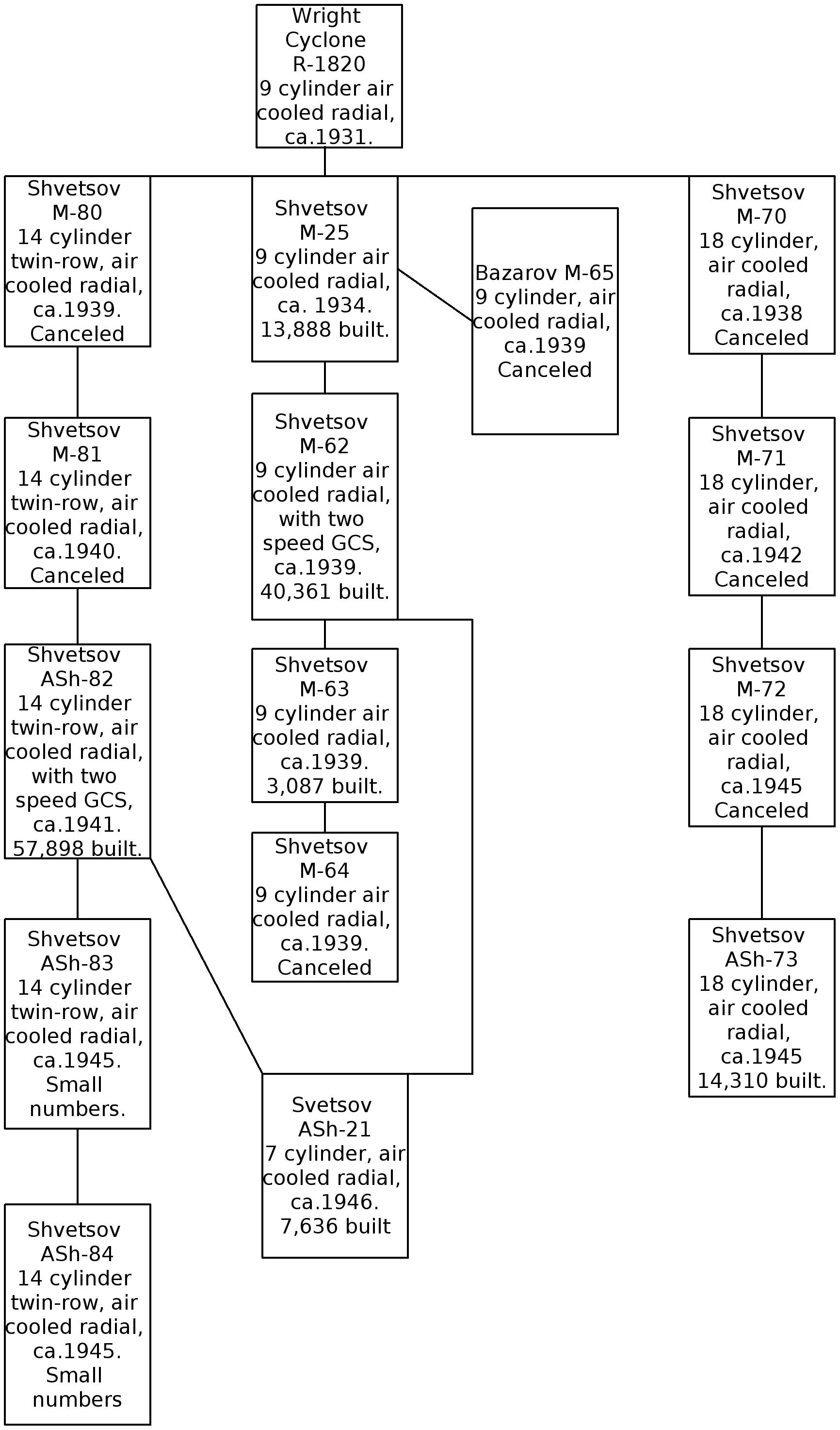
Family tree of Shvetsov engines

Data from Liss.

=== General characteristics ===
- Type: Nine-cylinder single-row supercharged air-cooled radial engine
- Bore: 155.5 mm (6.12 in)
- Stroke: 174.5 mm (6.87 in)
- Displacement: 29.876 L (1,823.1 cu in)
- Length: 1,213 mm (47.76 in)
- Diameter: 1,378 mm (54.25 in)
- Dry weight: 560 kg (1,230 lb)

=== Components ===
- Valvetrain: Overhead valves
- Supercharger: Two-speed centrifugal type supercharger
- Fuel system: Carburetor
- Fuel type: 92 RON, 87 (R+M)/2 (AKI) octane rating gasoline
- Cooling system: Air-cooled

=== Performance ===
- Power output:
- 746 kW (1,000 hp) at 2,200 rpm for takeoff
- 634 kW (850 hp) at 2,100 rpm at 4,200 m (13,780 ft)
- Specific power: 25.03 kW/L (0.55 hp/in^{3})
- Compression ratio: 6.4:1
- Specific fuel consumption: 469 g/(kW•h) (0.77 lb/(hp•h))
- Power-to-weight ratio: 1.3 kW/kg (.81 hp/lb)

== See also ==
Related development

- Shvetsov M-25
- Warbirds ASz-62 IR

Related lists

- List of aircraft engines
