= Shvetsov M-25 =

Soviet aircraft engine

M-25
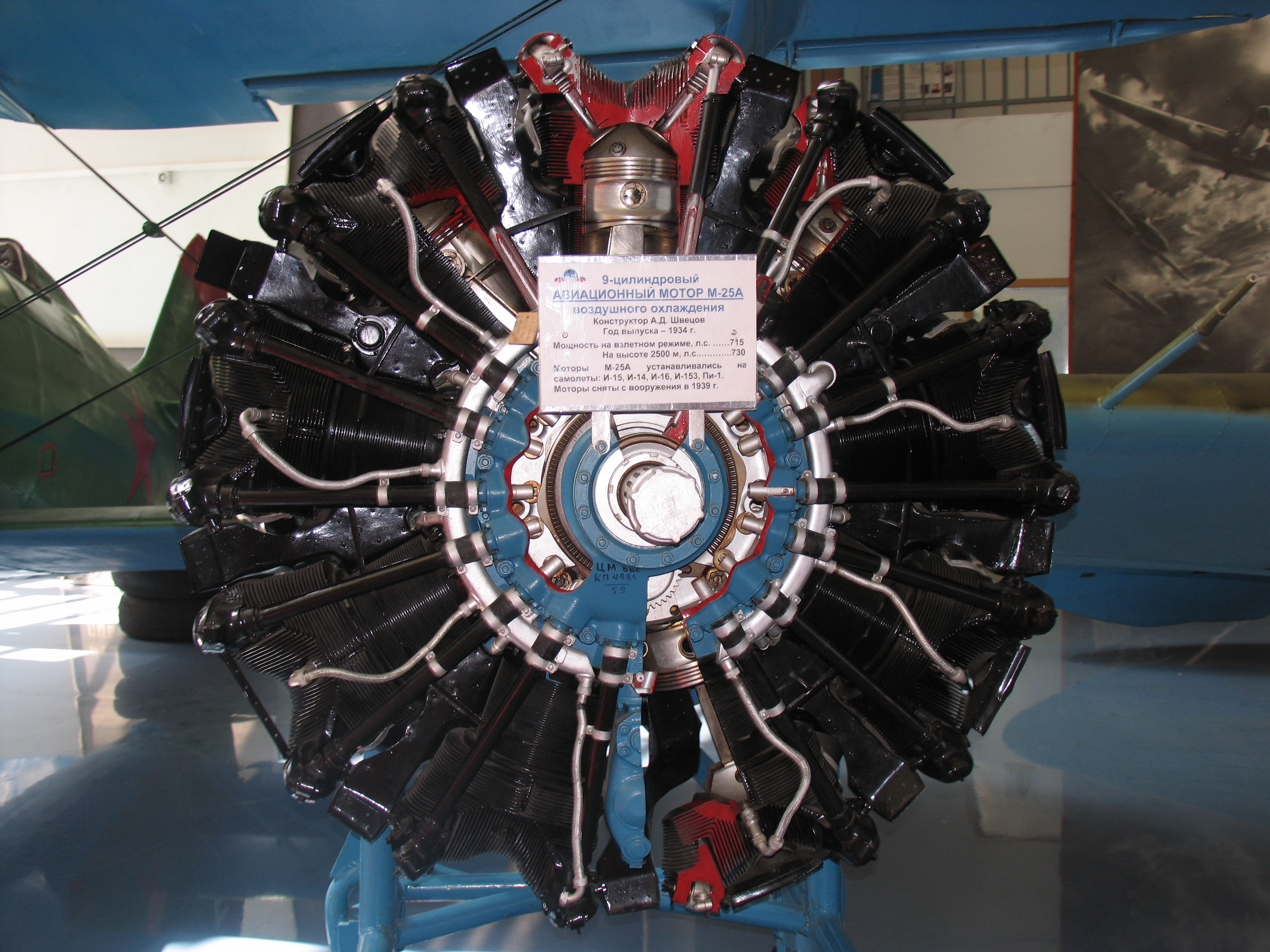
- Type: Radial engine
- Manufacturer: Shvetsov
- Number built: 13,888
- Developed from: Wright R-1820
- Developed into: Shvetsov ASh-62

The Shvetsov M-25 was an aircraft radial engine produced in the Soviet Union (USSR) in the 1930s and 1940s, a licensed production variant of the Wright R-1820-F3.

== Design and development ==
The first M-25s were produced from kits imported from the United States; the main difference between the later M-25 and the R-1820-F3 was the use of metric components. 13,888 M-25s were produced in the USSR at factories in Perm and Kazan. There were a number of sub-variants which differed from the original M-25 in that they had reduction gears, rather than direct drive. Performance was similar to the equivalent Wright engines. The M-25 was later developed into the ASh-62 and was later used as a pattern for the M-70. The M-70, a twin-row 18-cylinder engine, eventually developed into the ASh-73 which powered the Tupolev Tu-4, an unlicensed, reverse-engineered copy of the Boeing B-29 Superfortress.

== Applications ==
- Gotha Go 244
- Kharkiv KhAI-5bis
- Tupolev I-14
- Polikarpov I-15bis
- Polikarpov I-153
- Polikarpov I-16

== Specifications (Shvetsov M-25) ==
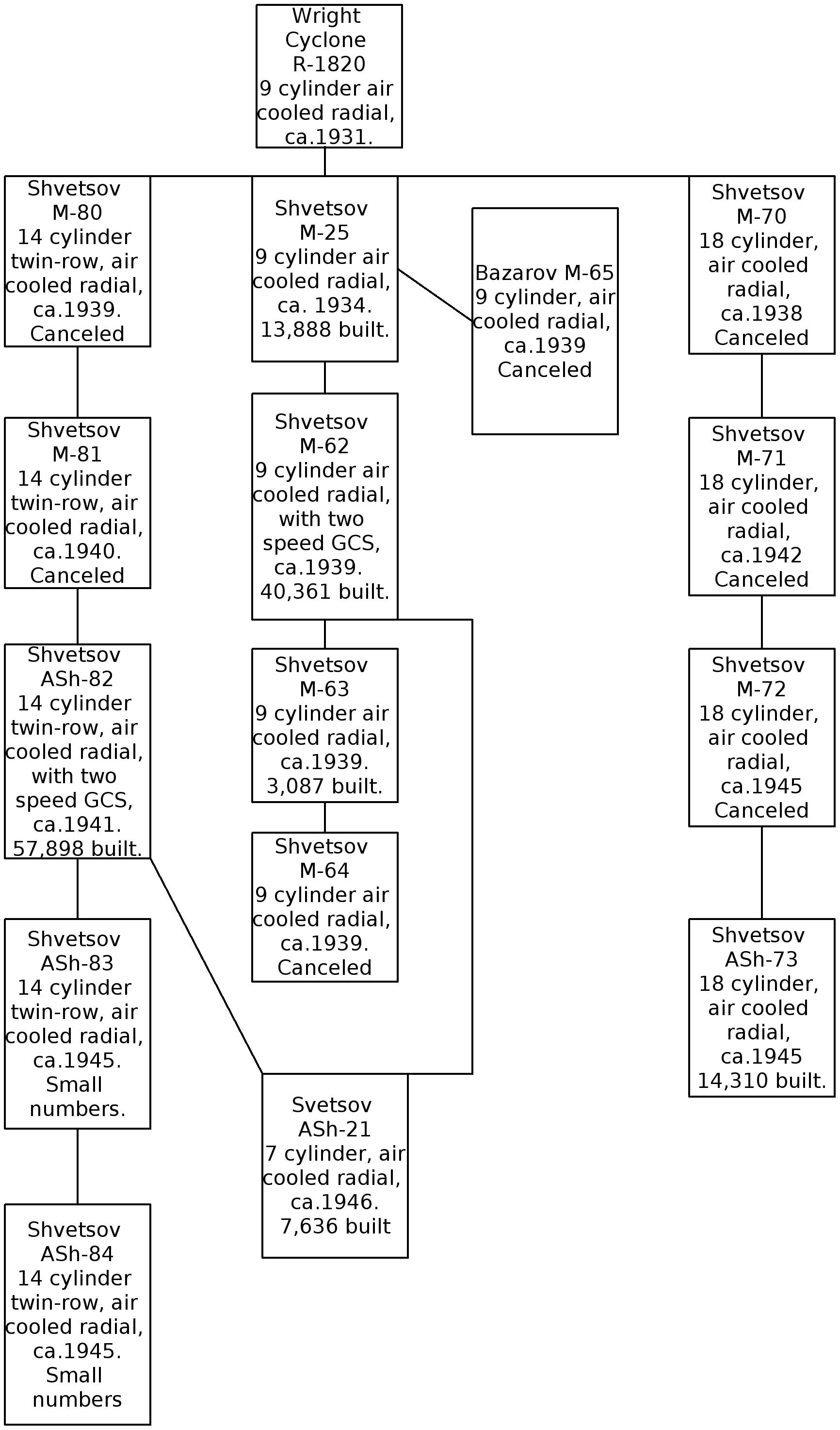
Family tree of Shvetsov engines

=== General characteristics ===
- Type: 9-cylinder, air-cooled, radial engine
- Bore: 155.5 mm (6.122 in)
- Stroke: 174.5 mm (6.870 in)
- Displacement: 29.876 L (1,823.1 cu in)
- Length: 1,100 mm (43.307 in)
- Diameter: 1,365 mm (53.740 in)
- Dry weight: 434 kg (957 lb)

=== Components ===
- Supercharger: Single speed, single stage, geared centrifugal supercharger
- Fuel system: 1 K-25 (Solex) Carburetor

=== Performance ===
- Power output: 520–600 kW (700–800 hp) depending on model
- Compression ratio: 6.4:1

== See also ==
Related development

- Wright R-1820 Cyclone

Related lists

- List of aircraft engines
