= Polikarpov I-153 =

1930s Soviet fighter aircraft

I-153
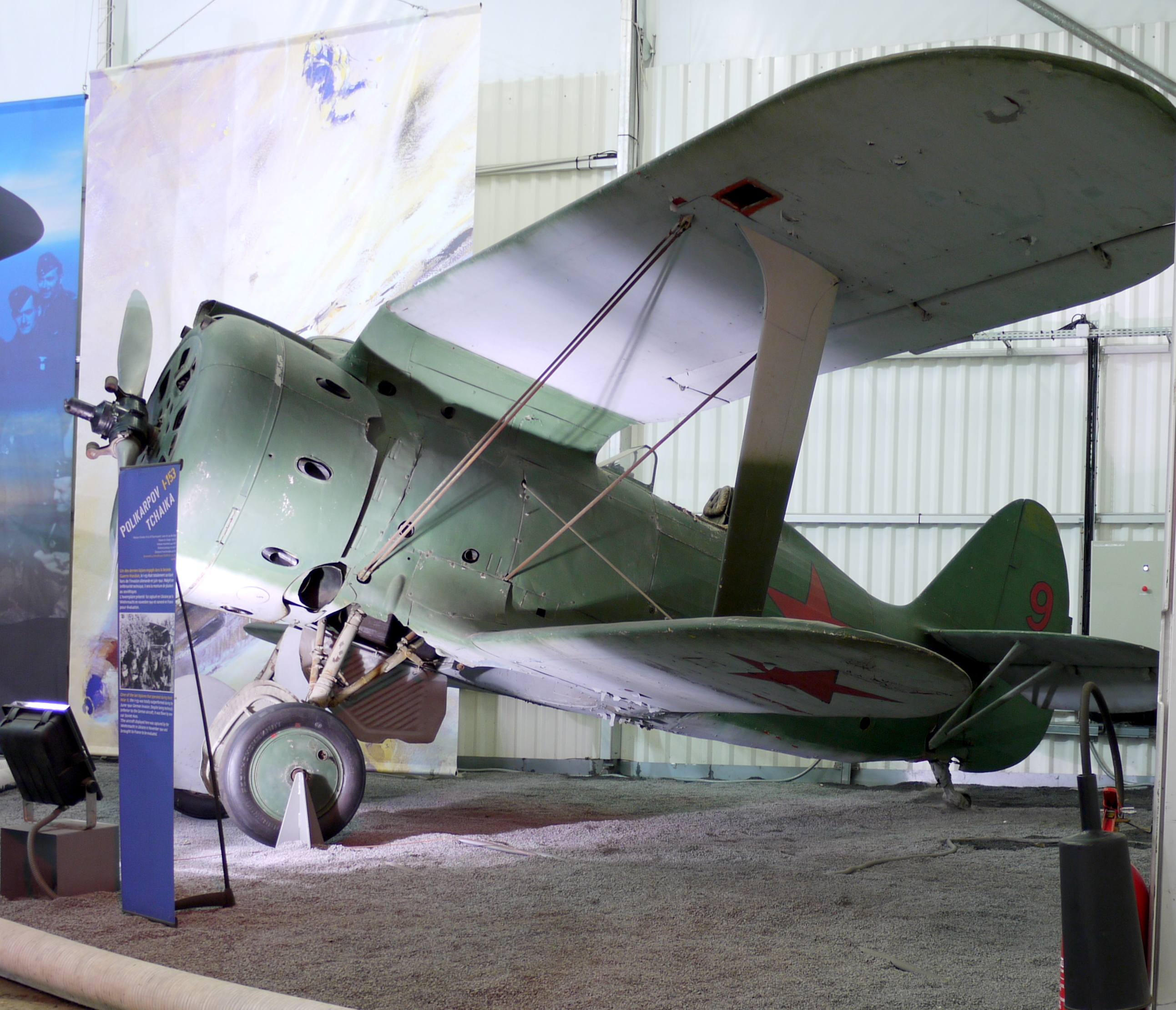
- Polikarpov I-153 at the Museum of Air and Space, Paris

General information
- Type: Fighter
- Manufacturer: Polikarpov
- Designer: Nikolai Nikolaevich Polikarpov
- Status: Retired
- Primary users: Soviet Air Force Chinese Nationalist Air Force
- Number built: 3,437

History
- Manufactured: 1939–1941
- Introduction date: 1939
- First flight: 1937
- Developed from: Polikarpov I-15

The Polikarpov I-153 Chaika (Russian: Чайка, lit. 'gull') is a late 1930s Soviet sesquiplane fighter. Developed from the I-15 with a retractable undercarriage, the I-153 fought in the Soviet-Japanese combats in Mongolia and was one of the major Soviet fighter types in the early years of the Second World War. Three I-153s are still in flying condition. The I-153 is powered by the Shvetsov M-62 radial engine.

== Design and development ==
In 1937, the Polikarpov design bureau carried out studies to improve on the performance of its I-15 and I-15bis biplane fighters without sacrificing manoeuvrability, as Soviet tactical doctrine was based on a mix of high performance monoplane fighters (met by the Polikarpov I-16) and agile biplanes. Early combat experience from the Spanish Civil War had shown that the I-16 had problems dealing with the Fiat CR.32 biplanes used by the Italian forces supporting the Nationalists, which suggested a need to continue the use of biplane fighters, and as a result, Polikarpov's proposals were accepted, and his design bureau was instructed to design a new biplane fighter. Polikarpov assigned the task to the design team led by Aleksei Ya Shcherbakov, who was assisted by Artem Mikoyan and Mikhail Gurevich (who would later set up the MiG design bureau).

The new fighter (designated I-15ter by the design bureau and I-153 by the Soviet Air Forces (VVS)) was based closely on the design of the I-15bis, with a stronger structure, but was fitted with a manually retractable undercarriage to reduce drag. It reverted to the "gulled" upper wing of the original I-15 (Note: The Gull wing arrangement of the I-15 had proved unpopular with senior officials of the VVS as it gave a poor view from the cockpit and was blamed for poor directional stability. More recent reports from TsAGI, the Central Aerohydrodynamics Institute, stated that stability of the gull wing arrangement improved at high speeds.) but used the Clark YH aerofoil of the I-15bis. The four 7.62 mm PV-1 machine guns of the I-15bis were replaced by four ShKAS machine guns. While still rifle-calibre weapons, these fired much faster than the PV-1s, (1,800 rounds per minute rather than 750 rounds per minute) giving a much greater weight of fire. The new fighter was to be powered by a Shvetsov M-62 an improved derivative of the Shvetsov M-25 that powered the I-15 and I-15bis with twin superchargers.

The aircraft was of mixed metal and wood construction, with the fuselage structure being based on chromium-molybdenum steel with duralumin skinning on the forward fuselage, and fabric covering on the fuselage aft of the front of the cockpit. The aircraft's wings were made of fabric covered wood, while the tail surfaces were of fabric covered duralumin. The aircraft was fitted with a tailwheel undercarriage, with the mainwheels retracting rearwards, rotating through 90 degrees to lie flat in the wing roots, being actuated by cables operated by a pilot-driven handwheel. The solid rubber tailwheel did not retract, but moved in conjunction with the rudder.

The M-62 was not ready by the time the first prototype was complete, so it was fitted with a 750 hp (560 kW) M-25V engine when it made its maiden flight in August 1938. The first prototype failed factory testing due to numerous defects, but this did not stop production, with the aircraft entering production concurrently with ongoing testing and development. Early production I-153s powered by the M25 engine passed state testing during 1939, despite the loss of one aircraft which disintegrated in a 500 km/h (311 mph) dive. In test flights, the I-153 (M-25) achieved the top speed of 424 km/h (264 mph), service ceiling of 8,700 m (28,500 ft), and required 6 minutes 24 seconds to reach 5,000 m (16,404 ft). This performance was well in excess of that demonstrated by the I-15bis.

During 1939, production switched to a version powered by the originally planned M-62 engine, with an M-62 powered prototype undergoing state testing from 16 June 1939. While speed at sea level was virtually unchanged, the new engine improved performance at altitude. A speed of 443 km/h (275 mph) at 4,600 m (15,100 ft) was recorded, with a service ceiling of 9,800 m (32,100 ft). This performance was disappointing, and caused the aircraft to fail the state acceptance trials, although this did not disrupt production. While it was recognised that the I-153's performance was inadequate, the over-riding requirement was to not disrupt production until more advanced fighters could enter production.

While numerous improvements were proposed, many were too radical to be implemented since the aircraft was already in production. Desperate to improve performance, Polikarpov tested two I-153 with the Shvetsov M-63 engine with 820 kW (1,100 hp). However, the results were disappointing and it was becoming clear that the biplane airframe was incapable of higher speeds.

One of the rarely mentioned characteristics of the I-153 was its poor performance in a spin. While the Polikarpov I-16 had gained notoriety for entering spins, pilots found it easy to recover from a spin. In contrast, while the I-153 was difficult to spin, once it lost control, recovery was difficult to the point where intentional spinning was forbidden for some time. A spin recovery procedure was eventually developed but, while effective, it required flawless timing and execution.

By the end of production in 1941, a total of 3,437 I-153s were built.

== Operational history ==
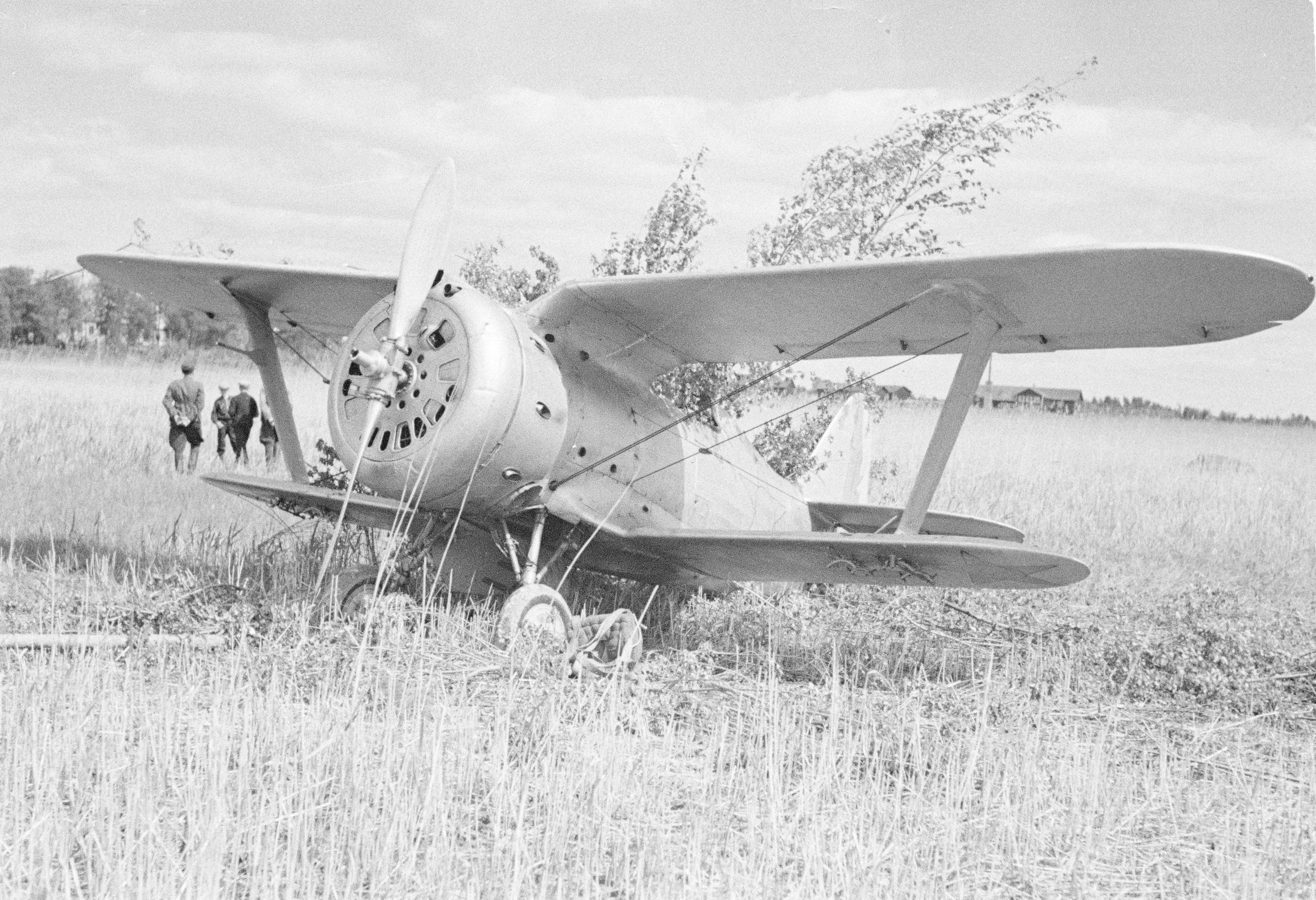
I-153 captured by Finnish forces after a forced landing, June 1941

The I-153 first saw combat in 1939 during the Soviet-Japanese Battle of Khalkin Gol in Mongolia. The Japanese Army Air Forces' Type 97 Fighter (Nakajima Ki-27) Nate proved a formidable opponent for the I-15bis and I-16, but was more evenly matched with the I-153, which retained agility inherent to biplanes while having improved performance. While the overall I-153 performance was satisfactory, some significant problems were revealed. Most troublesome was the absence of a firewall between the fuel tank mounted in front of the cockpit and the pilot. Combined with strong draft coming in through the wheel wells, fuel tank fires invariably resulted in rapid engulfment of the cockpit and severe burns to the pilot. In addition, the M-62 engine suffered from a service life of only 60–80 hours due to failures of the two-speed supercharger.

The Polikarpov I-153 Chaika never flew with any Spanish Air Force units during or after the Spanish Civil War. Two earlier variants of this aircraft, the I-15 and the I-15bis, did fly with the Republican Air Force during the conflict and, later, captured examples of both types were used by the Ejército del Aire till the early 1950s.

== Variants ==
While attempts to improve performance proved largely fruitless, Polikarpov had some success in upgrading the armament. The I-153 series underwent trials with two synchronized 12.7 mm (0.5 in) TKB-150 (later designated Berezin BS) machine guns, and about 150 aircraft were built with a single TKB-150 in the fuselage and two ShKAS in the wings (a single TKB-150 was used because of the shortage of this weapon which was shared with I-16 Type 29). Late in production, about 400 aircraft were modified with metal plates under the wings to accommodate RS-82 unguided rockets.

Other variants included:

- I-153DM (Dopolnityelnyi Motor – supplementary engine) - On an experimental basis, the I-153DM was flown with gasoline-burning ramjet engines under the wings. DM-2 engines increased the top speed by 30 km/h (19 mph) while more powerful DM-4 engines added as much as 51 km/h (32 mph). A total of 74 flights were undertaken.
- I-153P (Pushechnyy – cannon armed)- two synchronized 20 mm (0.79 in) ShVAK cannons, added firepower was offset by the increase in weight and tendency of gunpowder to foul the windscreen. At least eight built.
- I-153Sh and USh - ground attack versions with underwing containers with four ShKAS machine guns (Sh) or and twenty 2.5 kg (5.5 lb) bombs (USh).
- I-153TK - Four prototypes fitted with M-25V or M-62 engines boosted by twin TK-1 superchargers. Twenty production aircraft built.
- I-153V (Vysotnoi - height) (also known as I-190GK (Germetichyeskoi Kabine – hermetic (pressure) cabin) - A single aircraft fitted with the definitive Schyerbakov "minimum leak" pressure cabin.
- I-153V-TKGK (Vysotnoi-TK Germetichyeskoi Kabine - height turbocharged hermetic (pressure) cabin) - high-altitude version with a turbocharged M-63 engine and a pressurized cockpit. One built.
- I-153UD - rear fuselage completed as a wooden monocoque rather than fabric-covered steel and wooden frame to save metal, did not enter production.
- 50 I-153 were equipped with larger oil tanks and plumbed to accept external fuel tanks under the wings which doubled the combat range. These were primarily used by the Soviet Navy.
- I-190 - experimental version powered by an 820 kW (1,100 hp) M-88V radial piston engine with two ShVAK cannon and four ShKAS machine guns. First flight 30 December 1939 but crashed 13 February 1941 and variant discontinued.
- A second I-190 prototype completed with a pressurized cabin and turbocharged M-90 engine fitted with a ducted spinner.
- I-195 - Strengthened I-190 with enclosed unpressurized cockpit, powered by an M-90 with a ducted spinner and identical armament to the I-190. The prototype was not completed.

== Operators ==
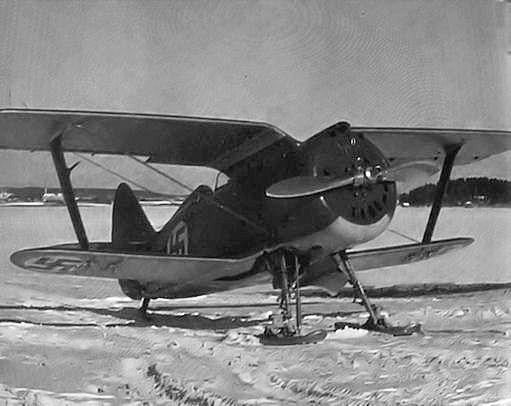
A Finnish Air Force Polikarpov I-153.

China

- Chinese Nationalist Air Force

Finland

- Finnish Air Force operated 21 captured aircraft, 11 of which were bought from Germany, of which 10 were actually delivered. They flew with the serial numbers IT-11 to IT-31. In Finnish service, FAF pilots claimed at least 5 kills in I-153s against the Soviets. The code letters 'IT' denoted Istrebitel Tshaika (Fighter Chaika).

Nazi Germany

- Luftwaffe operated captured aircraft.

Soviet Union

- Soviet Air Force
- Soviet Naval Aviation

== Surviving aircraft ==
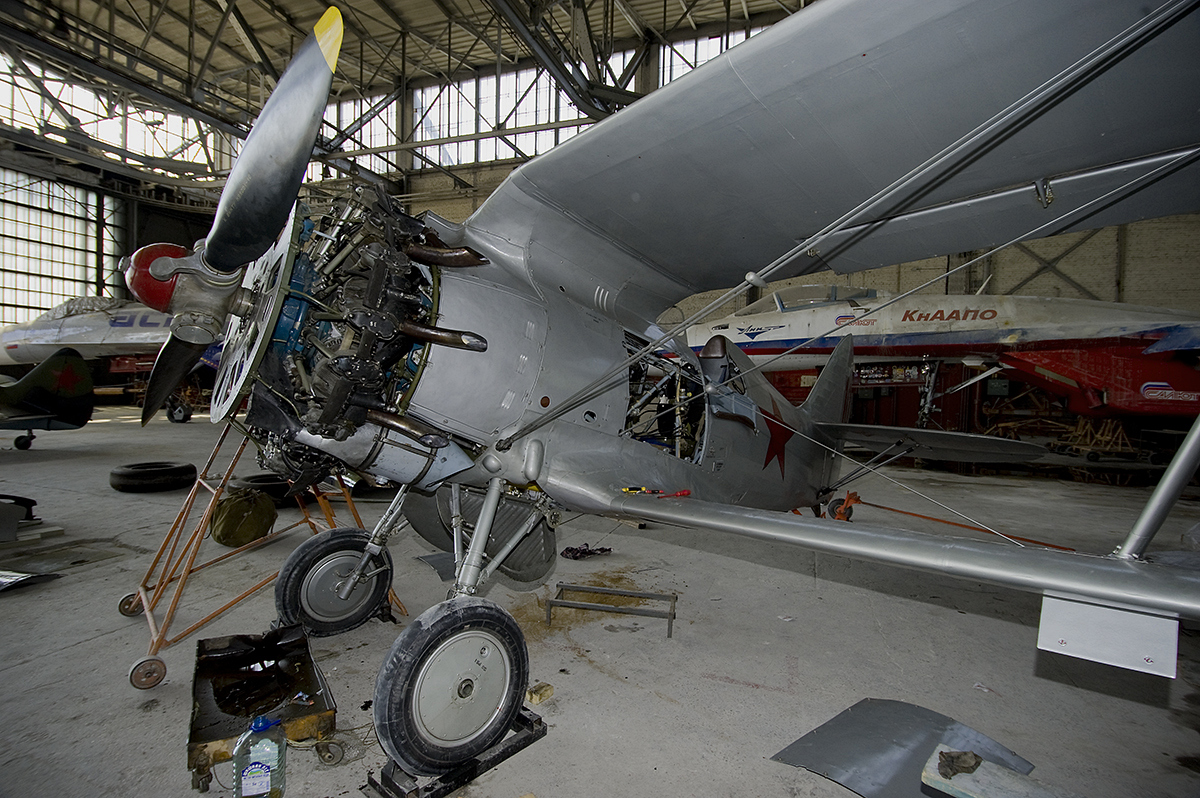
A Polikarpov I-153 with the cowling removed.

There are four complete survivors of this plane, three of which can fly. In the early 1990s, New Zealand pilot and entrepreneur Tim Wallis' Alpine Fighter Collection organised the restoration of three I-153s and six I-16s to an airworthy condition, this project being completed in 1999 as the third and final I-153 arrived in New Zealand. These aircraft were equipped with AZsh-62IR geared radials instead of the M-62, which were non-geared. The reason is that AZsh-62IR is just a version of M-62, with absolute equality in all instead of a frontal gearbox and weapon synchronizer absence. Also, none of original engines from recovered wrecks could have been brought to life.

=== France ===
- 7277 – I-153 on static display at the Musée de l'Air in Paris, Île-de-France. It is being restored by the Memorial Flight Association. This is the only fully original I-153 known to exist.

=== Russia ===
- 6326 – I-153 with Vadim Zadorozhny in Russia. It is painted as Red 10 and registered as RA-1562G.
- There is also an airworthy example in Russia.

=== Spain ===
- 7027 – I-153 airworthy at the Fundació Parc Aeronautic de Catalunya in Sabadell, Catalonia as EC-LJL.

=== United States ===
- 6316 – I-153 airworthy at the Military Aviation Museum in Virginia Beach, Virginia as N153RP.

== Specifications (I-153 (M-62)) ==
Data from Of Chaika and Chato...Polikarpov's Fighting Biplanes"

General characteristics

- Crew: one
- Length: 6.17 m (20 ft 3 in)
- Wingspan: 10 m (32 ft 10 in)
- Height: 2.8 m (9 ft 2 in)
- Wing area: 22.14 m^{2} (238.3 sq ft)
- Airfoil: Clark YH
- Empty weight: 1,452 kg (3,201 lb)
- Gross weight: 1,960 kg (4,321 lb)
- Max takeoff weight: 2,110 kg (4,652 lb)
- Powerplant: 1 × Shvetsov M-62 9-cylinder air-cooled radial piston engine, 597 kW (801 hp)
- Propellers: 2-bladed variable pitch propeller

Performance

- Maximum speed: 444 km/h (276 mph, 240 kn) at 4,600 m (15,100 ft)
- Cruise speed: 297 km/h (185 mph, 160 kn) at 2,000 m (6,600 ft)
- Range: 470 km (290 mi, 250 nmi)
- Service ceiling: 10,700 m (35,100 ft)
- Rate of climb: 15 m/s (3,000 ft/min)
- Time to altitude: 7,000 m (23,000 ft) in 8 minutes 18 seconds

Armament

- Guns: 4 × 7.62 mm (0.300 in) ShKAS machine guns with 2,600 rounds of ammunition
- Rockets: 8 × 82 mm (3.228 in) RS-82 rockets

== See also ==
Related development

- Polikarpov I-15

Aircraft of comparable role, configuration, and era

- Avia B-534
- Fiat CR.42
- Gloster Gladiator
- Grumman F3F

Related lists

- List of interwar military aircraft
- List of aircraft of World War II
