= Wright R-1820 Cyclone =

R-9 piston aircraft engine family

R-1820 Cyclone
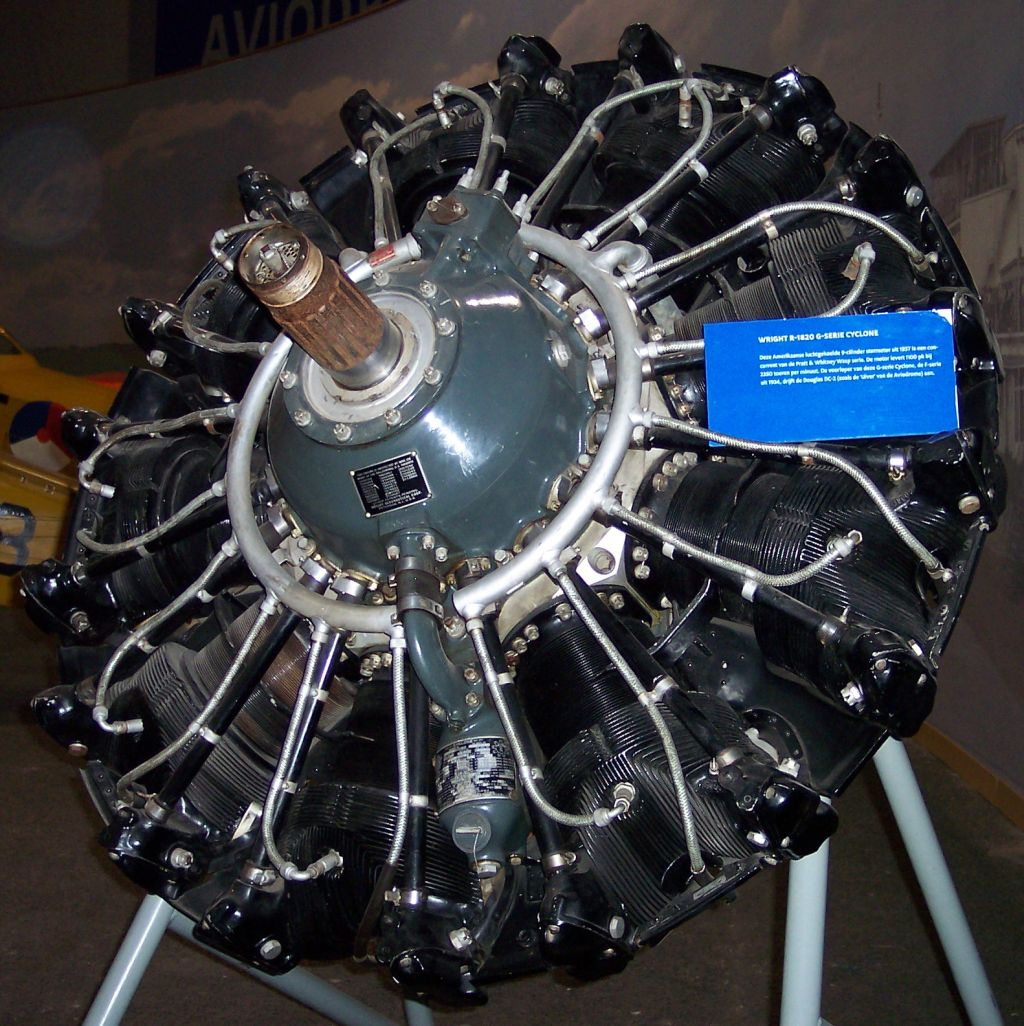
- Curtiss-Wright R-1820 Cyclone Radial Engine
- Type: Radial engine
- National origin: United States
- Manufacturer: Wright Aeronautical
- First run: 1930s
- Major applications: Boeing B-17 Flying Fortress; Curtiss P-36 Hawk; Douglas B-18 Bolo; Douglas DC-3; Douglas SBD Dauntless; General Motors FM-2 Wildcat; Sikorsky H-34; North American T-28 Trojan
- Manufactured: June 1932–December 1963
- Number built: 119,975
- Developed into: Wright R-2600; Wright R-3350
- Variants: Shvetsov M-25

The Wright R-1820 Cyclone 9 is an American radial engine developed by Curtiss-Wright, widely used on aircraft in the 1930s through 1950s. It was produced under license in France as the Hispano-Suiza 9V or Hispano-Wright 9V, and in the Soviet Union as the Shvetsov M-25.

== Design and development ==
The R-1820 Cyclone 9 represented a further development of the Wright P-2 engine dating back to 1925. Featuring a greater displacement and a host of improvements, the R-1820 entered production in 1931. The engine remained in production well into the 1950s.

The R-1820 was built under license by Lycoming, Pratt & Whitney Canada, and also, during World War II, by the Studebaker Corporation. The Soviet Union had purchased a license for the design, and the Shvetsov OKB was formed to metricate the American specification powerplant for Soviet government-factory production as the M-25, with the R-1820's general design features used by the Shvetsov design bureau for many of their future radials for the Soviet air forces through the 1940s and onwards. In Spain the R-1820 was license-built as the Hispano-Suiza 9V or Hispano-Wright 9V.

The R-1820 was at the heart of many famous aircraft including early Douglas airliners (the prototype DC-1, the DC-2, the first civil versions of the DC-3, and the limited-production DC-5), every wartime example of the Boeing B-17 Flying Fortress and Douglas SBD Dauntless bombers, the early versions of the Polikarpov I-16 fighter (as the M-25), and the Piasecki H-21 helicopter.

The R-1820 also found limited use in armored vehicles. The G-200 variant developed 900 hp (670 kW) at 2,300 rpm and powered the strictly experimental M6 Heavy Tank.

The R-1820-E was issued an approved type certificate in September 1930.

The R-1820-97 was the most produced variant, with 64,093 built.

=== D-200 Diesel ===
The Wright R-1820 was converted to multi-fuel during World War II by Caterpillar Inc. as the D-200 and produced 450 hp (340 kW) at 2,000 rpm in the M4A6 Sherman.

== Variants ==
R-1820-04
700 hp (520 kW)
R-1820-1
575 hp (429 kW)
R-1820-4
770 hp (570 kW)
R-1820-19
675 hp (503 kW)
R-1820-21
690 hp (510 kW)
R-1820-22
950 hp (710 kW)
R-1820-25
675 hp (503 kW), 750 hp (560 kW), 775 hp (578 kW)
R-1820-32
1,000 hp (750 kW)
XR-1820-32
800 hp (600 kW)
R-1820-33
775 hp (578 kW)
R-1820-34
940 hp (700 kW), 950 hp (710 kW)
R-1820-34A
1,200 hp (890 kW)
R-1820-40/42
1,100 hp (820 kW), 1,200 hp (890 kW)
R-1820-41
850 hp (630 kW)
R-1820-45
800 hp (600 kW), 930 hp (690 kW)
R-1820-49
975 hp (727 kW)
R-1820-50
850 hp (630 kW)
R-1820-52
1,000 hp (750 kW)
R-1820-53
930 hp (690 kW), 1,000 hp (750 kW)
R-1820-56
1,200 hp (890 kW), 1,350 hp (1,010 kW)
R-1820-57
1,060 hp (790 kW)
R-1820-60
1,200 hp (890 kW)
R-1820-62
1,350 hp (1,010 kW)
R-1820-66
1,200 hp (895 kW), 1,350 hp (1,007 kW)
R-1820-67/69
1,200 hp (890 kW), fitted with turbosupercharger
R-1820-72W
1,350 hp (1,010 kW), 1,425 hp (1,063 kW)
R-1820-74W
1,500 hp (1,100 kW)
R-1820-76A,B,C,D
1,425 hp (1,063 kW)
R-1820-77
1,200 hp (890 kW)
R-1820-78
700 hp (522 kW), 1,100 hp (820 kW)
R-1820-80
700 hp (520 kW), 1,535 hp (1,145 kW)
R-1820-82WA
1,525 hp (1,137 kW)
R-1820-84
1,525 hp (1,137 kW)
R-1820-86
1,425 hp (1,063 kW)
R-1820-97
1,200 hp (890 kW), fitted with turbosupercharger
R-1820-103
1,425 hp (1,063 kW)
SGR-1820-F3
710 hp (530 kW), 720 hp (540 kW)
SGR-1820-F2
720 hp (540 kW)
R-1820-F53
770 hp (570 kW)
R-1820-F56
790 hp (590 kW)
GR-1820-G2
1,000 hp (750 kW)
R-1820-G3
840 hp (630 kW)
R-1820-G5
950 hp (710 kW)
R-1820-G101
1,100 hp (820 kW)
R-1820-G102
775 hp (578 kW)
GR-1820-G102A
1,100 hp (820 kW)
R-1820-G102A
1,100 hp (820 kW)
R-1820-G102A
1,100 hp (820 kW)
R-1820-G202A
1,200 hp (890 kW)
R-1820-G103
1,000 hp (750 kW)
R-1820-G105
1,000 hp (750 kW)
R-1820-G205A
1,200 hp (890 kW)

Notes: Unit numbers ending with W indicate engine variants fitted with water-methanol emergency power boost systems.

=== Hispano-Suiza 9V ===
The Hispano-Suiza 9V is a licence-built version of the R-1820.

Hispano-Suiza 9Vr
9V with reduction gear
Hispano-Suiza 9Vb
Hispano-Suiza 9Vbr
variant of the 9Vb with reduction gear
Hispano-Suiza 9Vbrs
variant of the 9Vb with reduction gear and supercharger
Hispano-Suiza 9Vbs
variant of the 9Vb with supercharger
Hispano-Suiza 9Vd
variant of the 9V
Hispano-Suiza 9V-10
429 kW (575 hp) driving fixed-pitch propeller
Hispano-Suiza 9V-11
as -10 but RH rotation
Hispano-Suiza 9V-16
480 kW (650 hp) driving variable-pitch propeller, LH rotation
Hispano-Suiza 9V-17
as -16 but RH rotation

== Applications ==
- Bloch MB.221
- Boeing B-17 Flying Fortress
- Boeing 307 Stratoliner
- Brewster F2A Buffalo
- Curtiss AT-32-A Condor
- Curtiss SBC-4 Helldiver
- Curtiss P-36 Hawk
- Curtiss SC Seahawk
- Curtiss-Wright CW-21
- Douglas A-33
- Douglas B-18 Bolo
- Douglas DC-2
- Douglas DC-3 (DST, G-102 and G-202)
- Douglas R4D-8/C-117D
- Douglas DC-5
- Douglas DF Wright SGR-1820G-2
- Douglas SBD Dauntless
- FMA AeMB.2 Bombi
- General Motors FM-2 Wildcat
- Grumman TF-1 / C-1 Trader
- Grumman E-1 Tracer
- Grumman FF
- Grumman F3F
- Grumman XF5F Skyrocket
- Grumman XP-50
- Grumman HU-16 Albatross
- Grumman J2F Duck
- Grumman S-2 Tracker
- Lockheed Model 14 Super Electra
- Lockheed Model 18 Lodestar
- Lockheed Hudson
- Martin B-10
- North American A-27
- North American O-47
- North American P-64
- North American T-28B/C/D Trojan
- Northrop N-3PB
- Northrop YC-125 Raider
- Piasecki H-21
- Polikarpov I-16
- PZL.44 Wicher
- Ryan FR Fireball
- Sikorsky S-58/HUS/HSS/H-34
- Vultee V-1

=== Vehicles ===
- M4A6 tank
- M6 heavy tank

== Engines on display ==
Preserved Wright R-1820 engines are on display at the following museums:

- American Airlines C.R. Smith Museum
- Fleet Air Arm Museum
- Delta Flight Museum
- National Air and Space Museum
- National Museum of the U.S. Air Force
- San Diego Air & Space Museum
- Wings of Freedom Aviation Museum
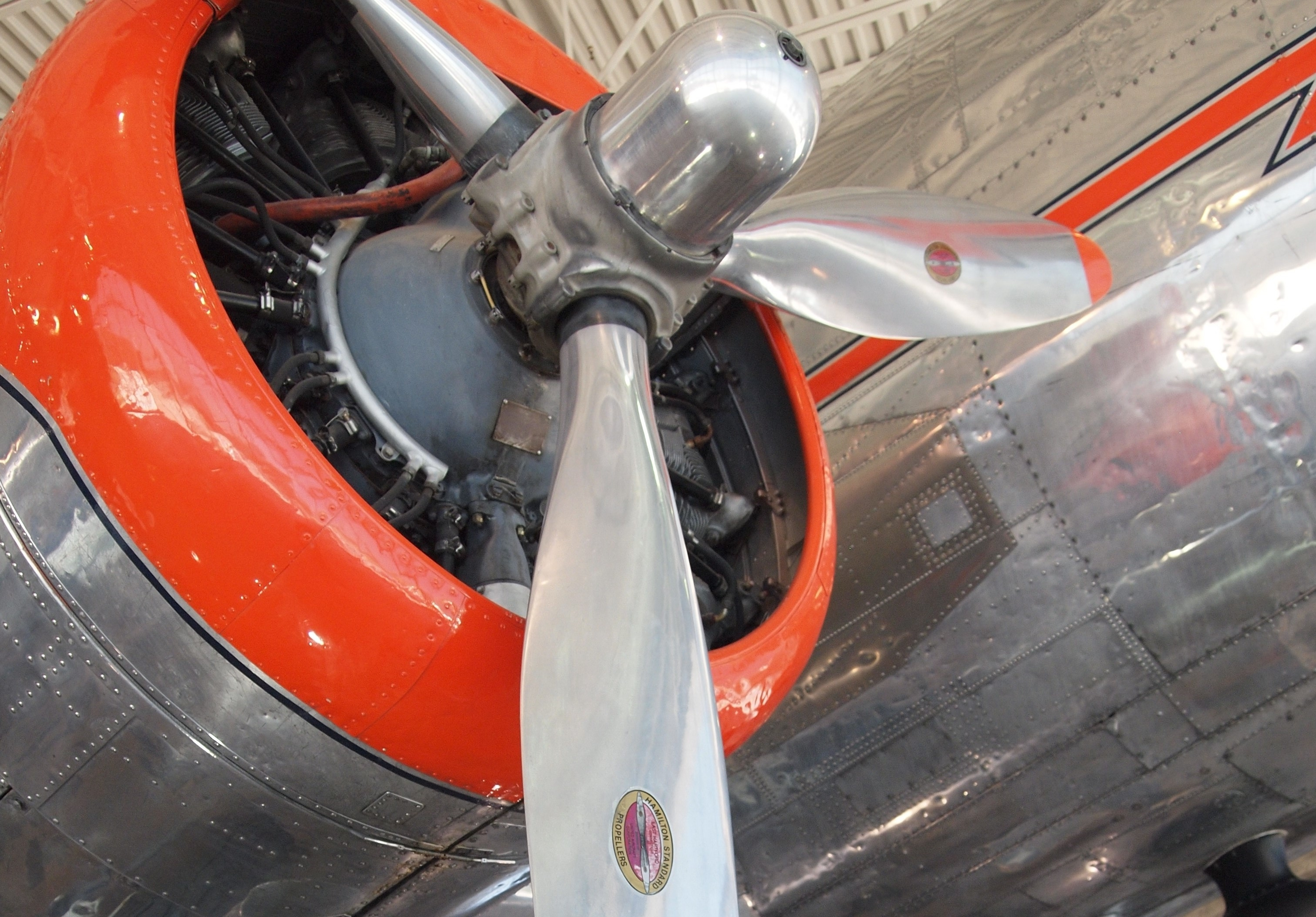
Wright R-1820 Cyclone 9 engine of restored Douglas DC-3 "Flagship Knoxville" at American Airlines C.R. Smith Museum

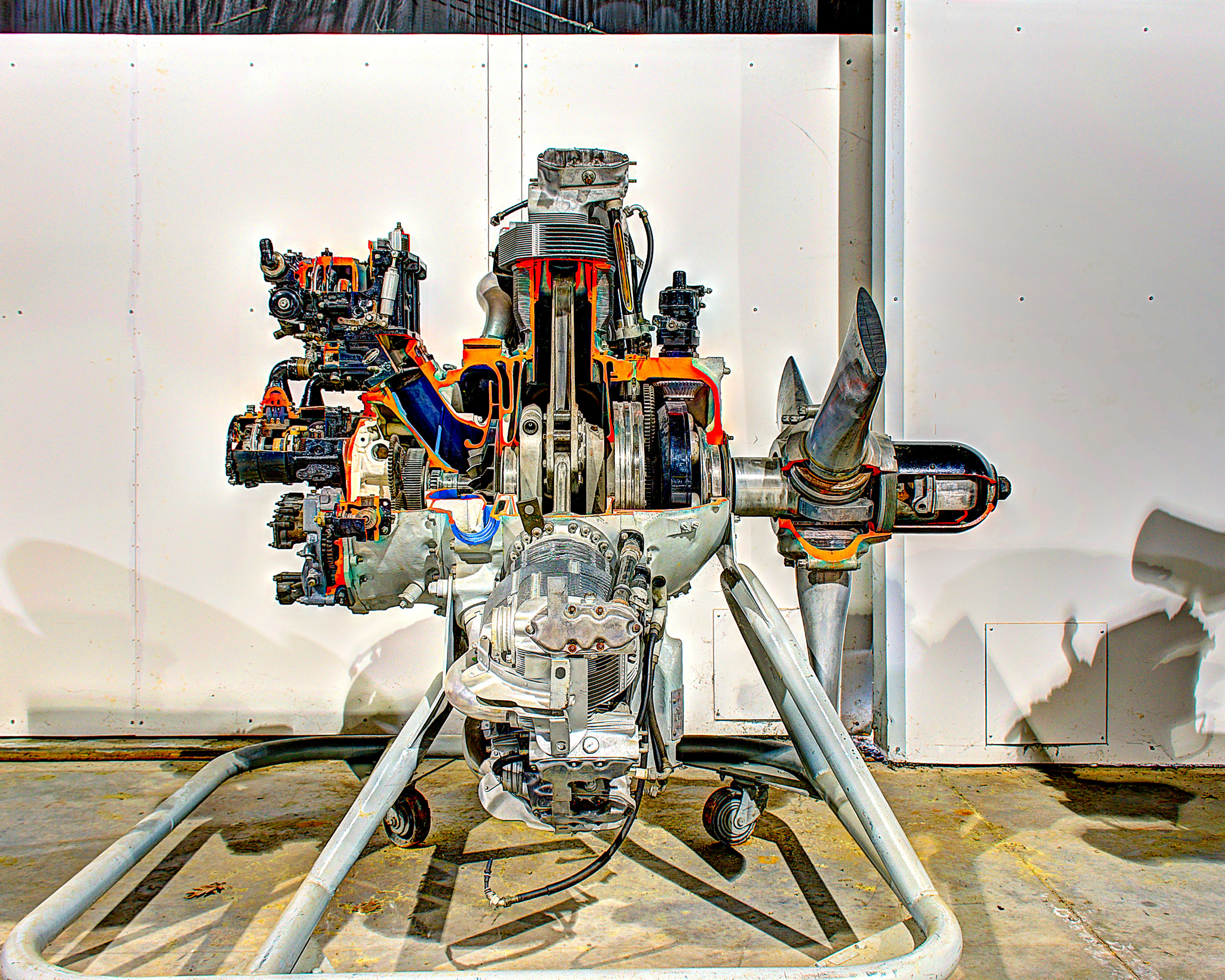
Wright R-1820 cutaway at the Museum of Aviation

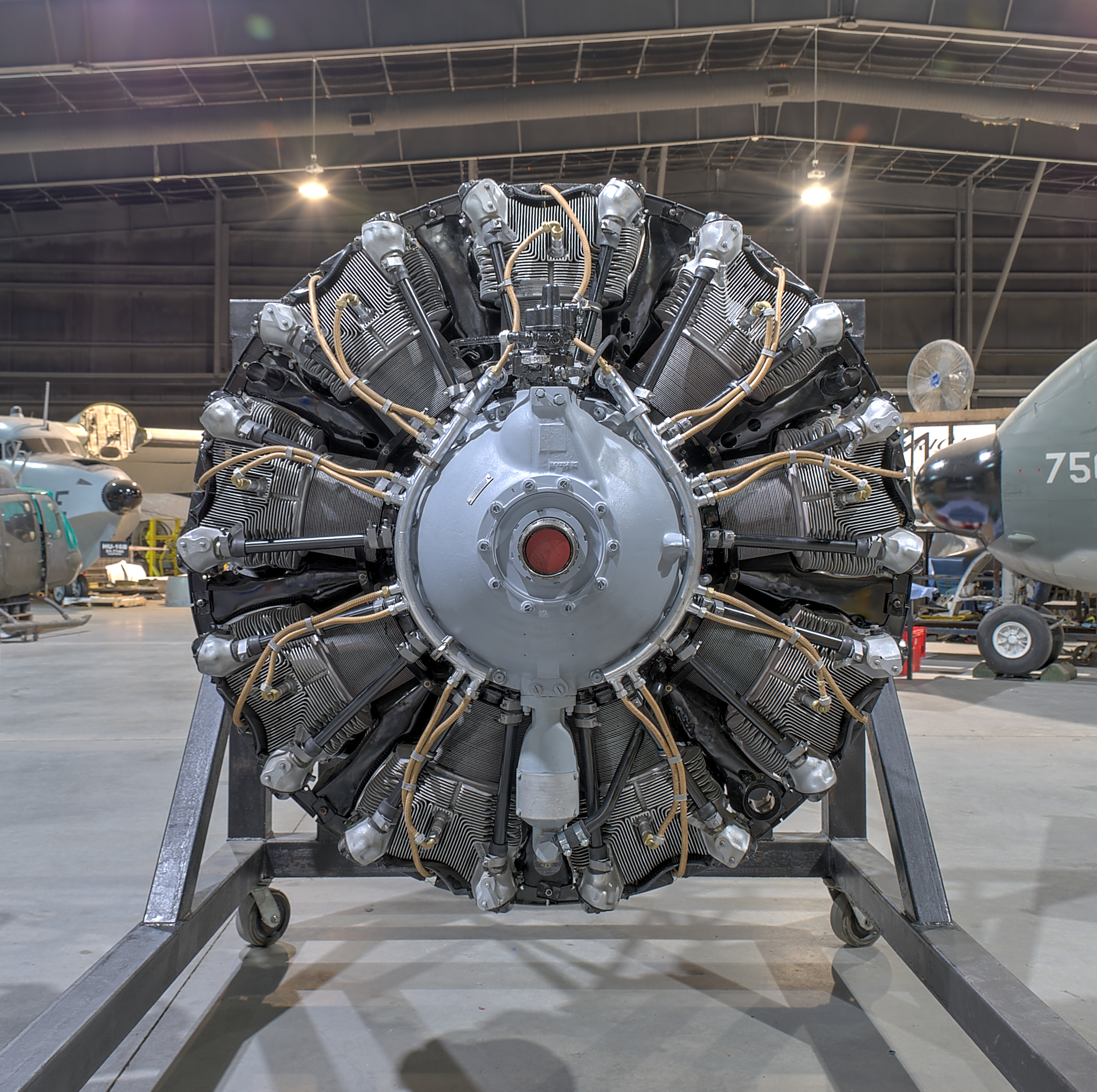
Wright R-1820 at the Museum of Aviation

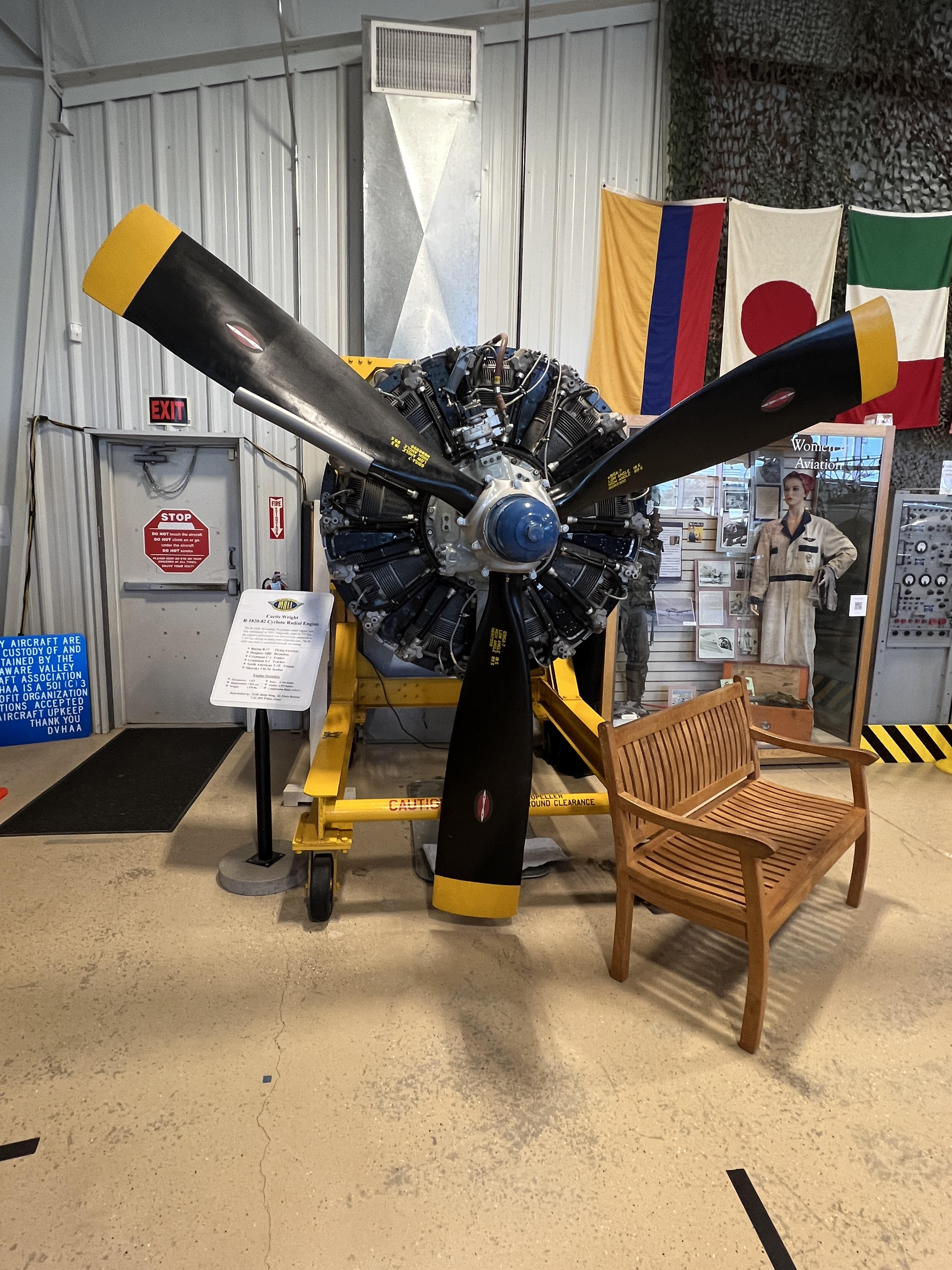
Wright R-1820-82 Cyclone Radial Engine at Wings of Freedom Aviation Museum, Horsham, Pennsylvania

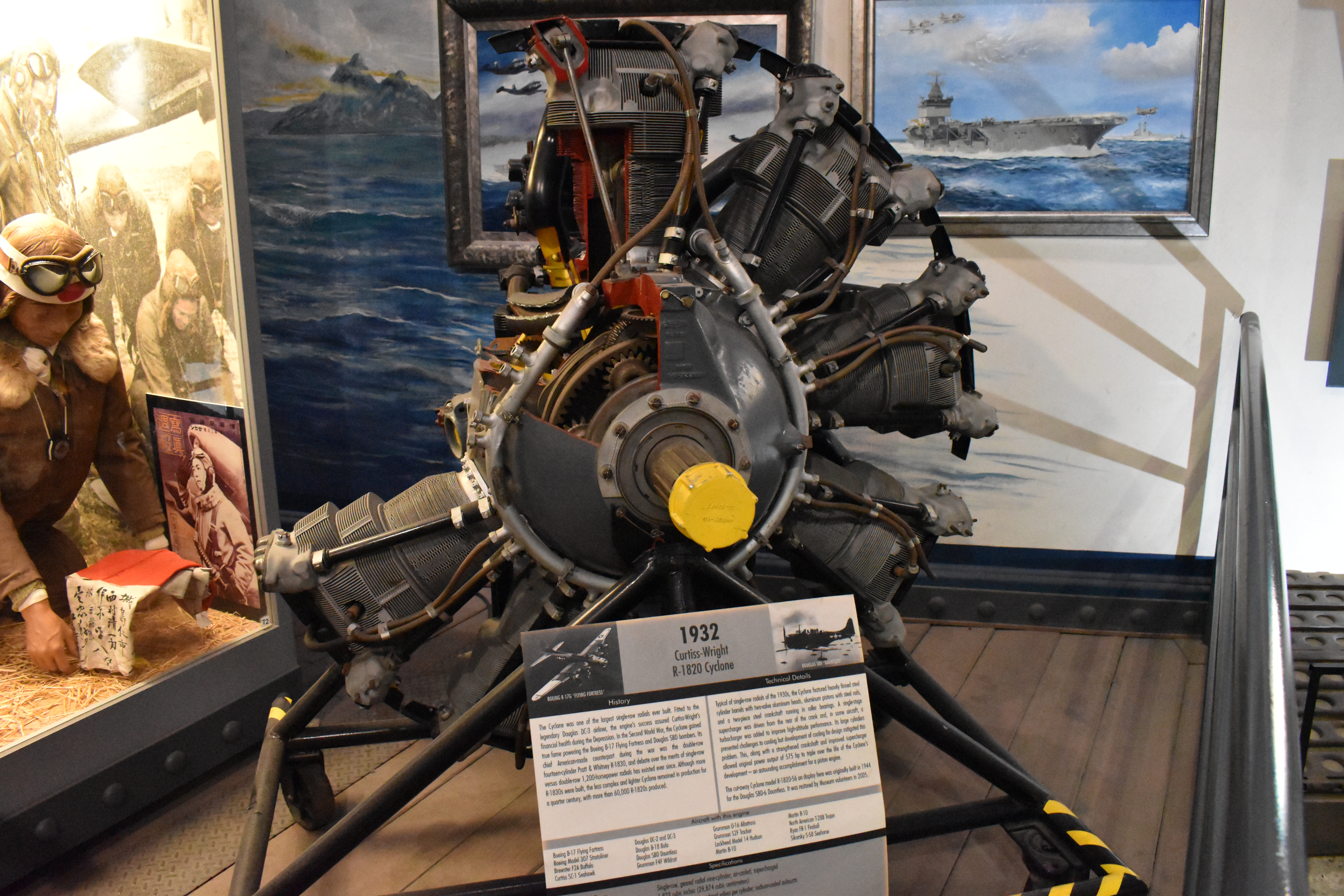
Curtiss Wright R-1820 Cyclone engine on display at the San Diego Air & Space Museum

== Specifications (GR-1820-G2) ==
Data from Jane's.

=== General characteristics ===
- Type: Nine-cylinder single-row supercharged air-cooled radial engine
- Bore: 6.125 in (155.6 mm)
- Stroke: 6.875 in (174.6 mm)
- Displacement: 1,823 cu in (29.87 L)
- Length: 47.76 in (1,213 mm)
- Diameter: 54.25 in (1,378 mm)
- Dry weight: 1,184 lb (537 kg)

=== Components ===
- Valvetrain: Two overhead valves per cylinder with sodium-filled exhaust valve
- Supercharger: Single-speed General Electric centrifugal type supercharger, blower ratio 7.134:1
- Fuel system: Stromberg PD12K10 downdraft carburetor with automatic mixture control
- Fuel type: 87 octane rating gasoline
- Oil system: Dry sump with one pressure and one scavenging pump
- Cooling system: Air-cooled

=== Performance ===
- Power output: 1,000 hp (746 kW) at 2,200 rpm for takeoff
- Specific power: 0.46 hp/in³ (20.88 kW/L)
- Compression ratio: 6.45:1
- Specific fuel consumption: 0.6 lb/(hp•h) (362 g/(kW•h))
- Oil consumption: 0.35-0.39 oz/(hp•h) (13-15 g/(kW•h))
- Power-to-weight ratio: 0.84 hp/lb (1.39 kW/kg)

== See also ==
Related development

- Wright Cyclone series
- Wright R-1300 Cyclone 7
- Wright R-2600 Cyclone 14 (Twin Cyclone)
- Wright R-3350 Cyclone 18 (Duplex Cyclone)
- Shvetsov M-25
- Shvetsov ASh-62

Comparable engines

- Alfa Romeo 128
- BMW 114
- Nakajima Hikari
- Pratt & Whitney R-1830 Twin Wasp
- Bristol Pegasus

Related lists

- List of aircraft engines
