= Bristol F.2 Fighter =

British fighter aircraft used in World War One

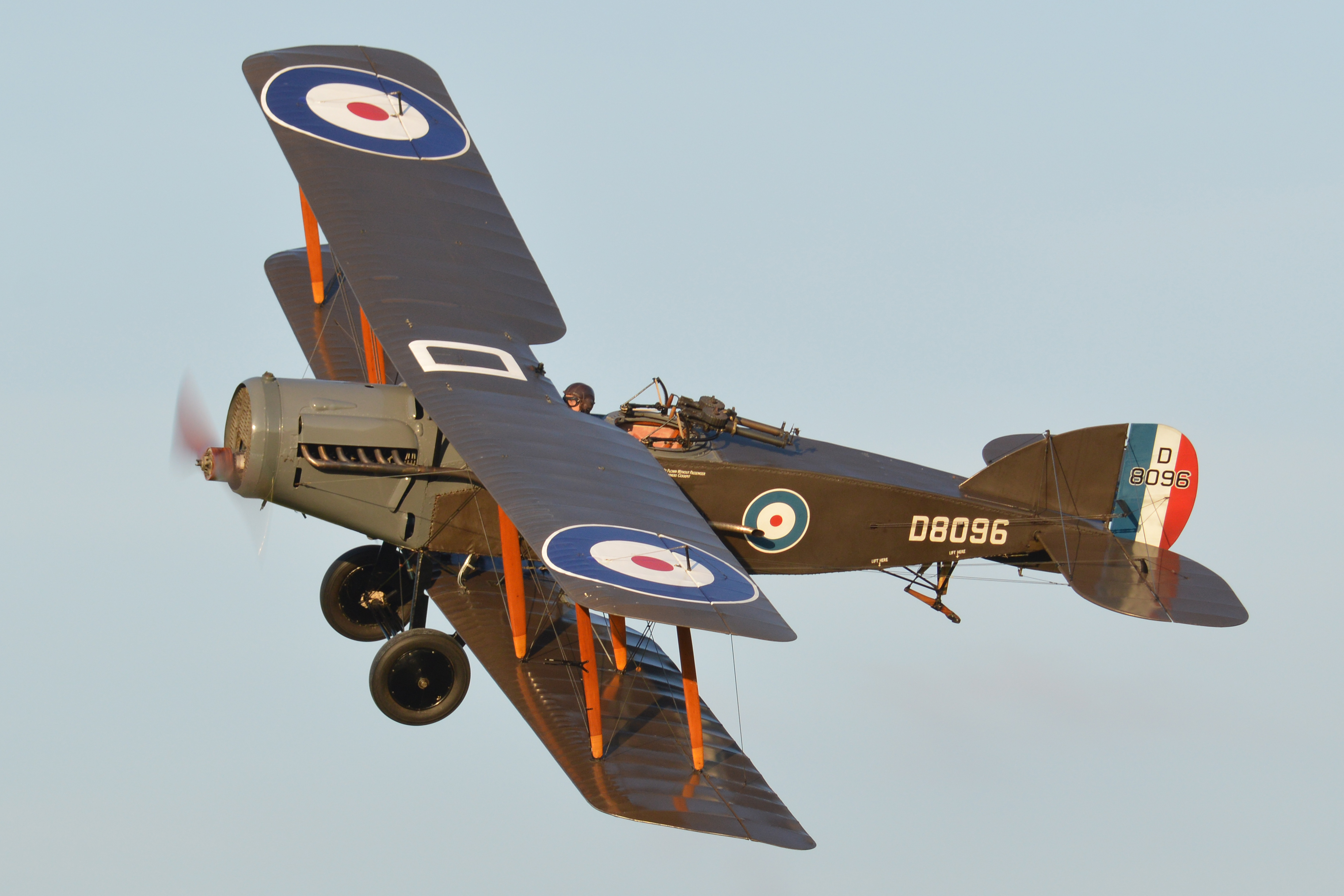
- The Shuttleworth Collection's Bristol F.2B Fighter

General information
- Type: Biplane fighter aircraft
- Manufacturer: British and Colonial Aeroplane Company
- Designer: Frank Barnwell
- Primary users: Royal Flying Corps Polish Air Force; Honduran Air Force
- Number built: 5,329

History
- Manufactured: 1916–1927
- First flight: 9 September 1916
- Retired: 1930s

The Bristol F.2 Fighter is a British First World War two-seat biplane fighter and reconnaissance aircraft developed by Frank Barnwell at the British and Colonial Aeroplane Company later known as the Bristol Aeroplane Company. It is often called the Bristol Fighter, "Brisfit" or "Biff".

Although the type was intended as a replacement for the pre-war Royal Aircraft Factory B.E.2c reconnaissance aircraft, the new Rolls-Royce Falcon V12 engine gave it the performance of a fighter.

Despite a disastrous début, the definitive F.2B proved to be a manoeuvrable aircraft that was able to hold its own against single-seat fighters while its robust design ensured that it remained in military service into the early 1930s. Some war-surplus aircraft were registered for civilian use and versions with passenger cabins were converted.

== Development ==
=== Origins ===
In late 1915, the Royal Flying Corps (RFC) needed a new aerial reconnaissance and artillery spotting aircraft to replace the pre-war Royal Aircraft Factory B.E.2c. Among other attributes and performance requirements, emphasis was placed upon the ability to defend itself in aerial combat.

Several new types were developed; the Royal Aircraft Factory offered its R.E.8 design and Armstrong Whitworth produced the design that eventually emerged as the F.K.8. In March 1916, Frank Barnwell of the British and Colonial Aeroplane Company (later the Bristol Aeroplane Company), commenced work on a replacement for the B.E.2. This initially took two forms, the Type 9 R.2A, to be powered by the 120 hp Beardmore engine and the similar Type 9A R.2B, powered by the 150 hp Hispano-Suiza. Both designs had the fuselage mounted between the wings, with a gap between the lower longerons and the wing, along with a substantial part of the fin beneath the fuselage. These features were intended to improve the field of fire for the observer; the positioning of the fuselage also resulted in the upper wing obscuring less of the pilot's field of view. The crew positions were placed as close together as possible, to help communication between the pilot and observer.

Before either the R.2A or R.2B could be built, the new 190 hp (142 kW) Rolls-Royce Falcon inline engine became available. Barnwell drafted a third revision of his design around the new engine, with its decidedly superior power/weight ratio. The anticipated improvement in performance changed the emphasis in its intended operational use; it was now seen as a replacement for the F.E.2d and Sopwith 1½ Strutter two-seat fighters, rather than a competitor with the pedestrian reconnaissance designs that were to replace the B.E.2. The resulting Type 12 F.2A, was a two-bay equal-span biplane, closely based on the R.2A and R.2B designs.

=== Prototypes ===
Bristol Fighter prototype with B.E.2d wings. Note column radiators on fuselage sides, forward of the wings.

In July 1916, work commenced on the construction of a pair of prototypes; on 28 August 1916, an initial contract was awarded for fifty production aircraft. On 9 September 1916, the first prototype performed its maiden flight, powered by a Falcon I engine. It was fitted with B.E.2d wings (Bristol were major contractors for the type) to save time; its lower wings were attached to an open wing-anchorage frame and had end-plates at the wing roots. On 25 October 1916, the second prototype was completed, powered by a Hispano-Suiza engine and differing from the first prototype in its tail-skid, which was integrated into the base of the rudder.

It was found that the prototype's radiator arrangement obscured the pilot's field of view and the nose was redesigned around a new circular-shaped frontal radiator in the cowling. Other changes made to the first prototype during flight testing included the elimination of the end-plates from the lower wing roots and the addition of a shallow coaming around the cockpits. Between 16 and 18 October 1916, the type underwent its official trials at the Central Flying School, Upavon, during which it was tested with a four-bladed 9-foot-2-inch (2.79 m) propeller and a two-bladed 9-foot-8-inch (2.95 m) propeller. By the time of its arrival at the experimental armament station at Orfordness it had also been fitted with a Scarff ring mounting over the rear cockpit and an Aldis optical sight.

Only 52 F.2A aircraft were manufactured before production began of the definitive model, the F.2B (retrospectively named Bristol Type 14), which first flew on 25 October 1916. The first 150 or so F.2Bs were powered by either the Falcon I or Falcon II engine but the remainder were equipped with the 275 hp (205 kW) Falcon III. The additional power gave the F.2B a 10 mph (16 km/h) advantage in level speed over the F.2A, while it was three minutes faster in a climb to 10,000 ft (3,000 m).

=== Armament ===
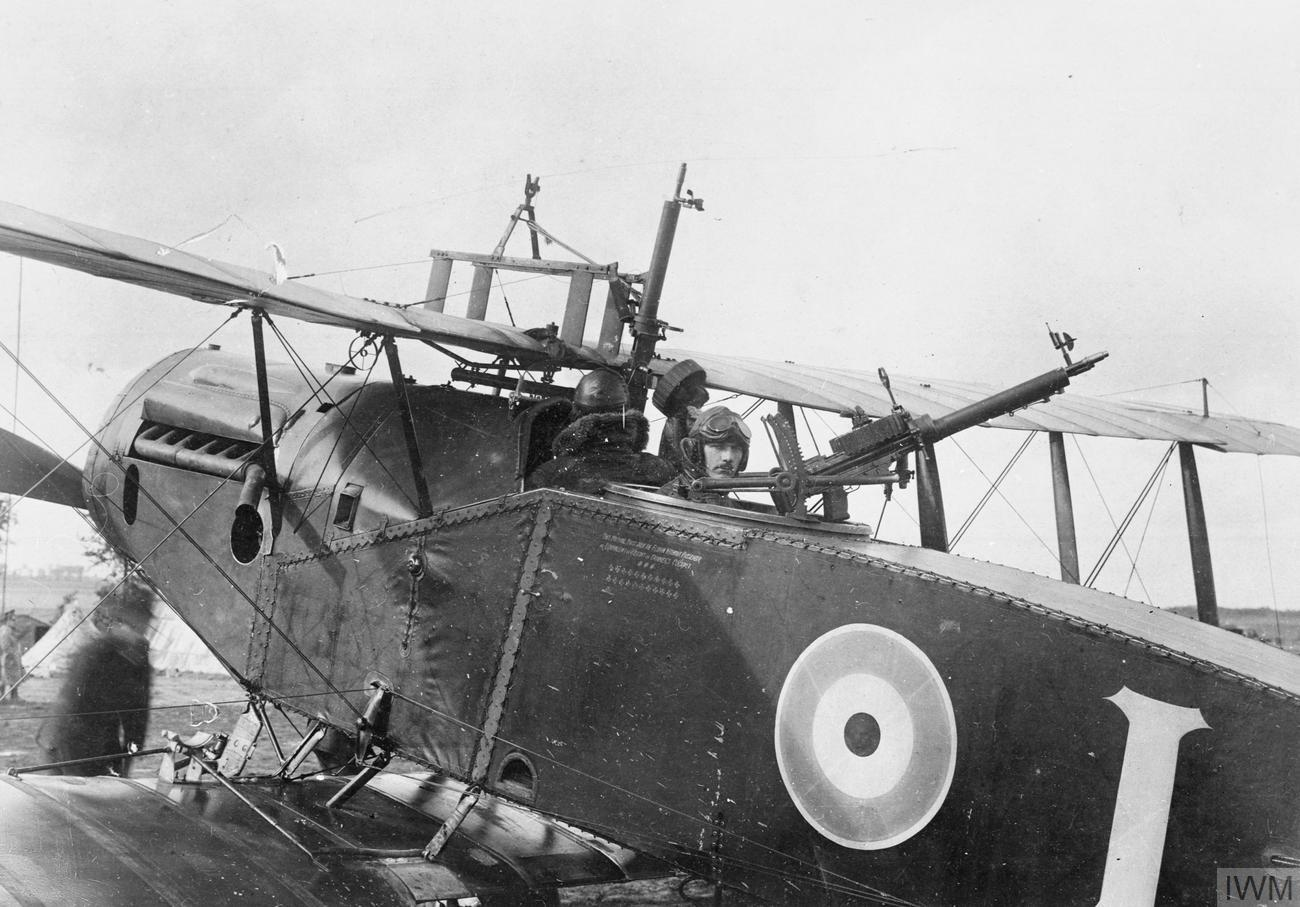
Bristol Fighter with Foster-mounted Lewis gun

The Bristol F.2 Fighter was armed in what had by then become standard for a British two-seater military aircraft: one synchronised fixed, forward-firing .303 in (7.7 mm) Vickers machine gun (in this case mounted under the cowling to avoid freezing) and a .303 in (7.7 mm) Lewis Gun on a Scarff ring over the observer's rear cockpit. The F.2B often carried a second Lewis gun on the rear cockpit mounting, although observers found the weight of the twin Lewis gun mounting difficult to handle in the high altitudes at which combat increasingly took place in the last year of the war, many preferring one gun. Attempts were made to add a forward-firing Lewis gun on a Foster mounting or similar on the upper wing either instead of (or with) the Vickers gun. Among other problems this caused interference with the pilot's compass, which was mounted on the trailing edge of the upper wing: to minimise this effect the Lewis gun was offset to starboard.

=== Alternative engines ===
Rolls-Royce aero engines of all types were in short supply, which frustrated plans to increase production to enable the F.2B to become the standard British two-seater, replacing the R.E.8 and F.K.8. Efforts were made to find an alternative powerplant that was reliable and sufficiently powerful. The Type 15 was fitted with a 200 hp (150 kW) Sunbeam Arab engine. In expectation of a reduction in performance with the less powerful engine, it was planned to supply the Arab-powered Fighters to the "corps" reconnaissance squadrons, reserving Falcon-powered examples for fighter–reconnaissance operations. The Arab engine was to be fitted to Fighters produced by subcontractors under licence, while Bristol-built Fighters would continue to use the Falcon.

In any event the Arab engine was not a success; it was found to suffer from serious weaknesses in cylinder and crank-chamber design that led, among other faults, to chronic and severe vibration, while the cooling system also required repeated modification. The "Arab Bristol" was never to become a viable combination, in spite of prolonged development. A few Arab-engined Bristols were at the front late in the war but the British reconnaissance squadrons had to soldier on with the R.E.8 and F.K.8 until the end of hostilities. The Type 16 was fitted with a 200 hp (150 kW) Hispano-Suiza engine. This worked better than the Arab but there was already a severe shortage of Hispano-Suizas for other types, such as the S.E.5a and the Sopwith Dolphin. The 300 hp (220 kW) version of the Hispano-Suiza, suggested for the Type 17, was not available in quantity before the end of the war.

Other engines tried or suggested for the F.2B were the 200 hp (150 kW) RAF 4d, the 180 hp (130 kW) Wolseley Viper and the 230 hp (170 kW) Siddeley Puma. Trials of the Puma engine were carried out in February 1918; it was found to confer marginally better performance than the Hispano-Suiza and Arab engines but was difficult to install and unreliable. In September 1918, trials of a high-compression model of the Puma were carried out but it was found to have no significant performance benefit and this avenue was not pursued. The Type 22 was a proposed version adapted for a radial or rotary engine, either a 200 hp (150 kW) Salmson radial, a 300 hp (220 kW) ABC Dragonfly radial (Type 22A) or a 230 hp (170 kW) Bentley B.R.2 rotary (Type 22B). The type number was eventually used for the Bristol F.2C Badger, a completely new design.

=== The All-Metal Bristol Fighter ===
The Bristol M.R.1 is often described as an all-metal version of the F.2B but was a new design, although its fuselage was positioned between the upper and lower wing as with the F.2B. Two prototypes were built; the first flew on 23 October 1917, but the M.R.1 never entered mass production.

=== American versions ===
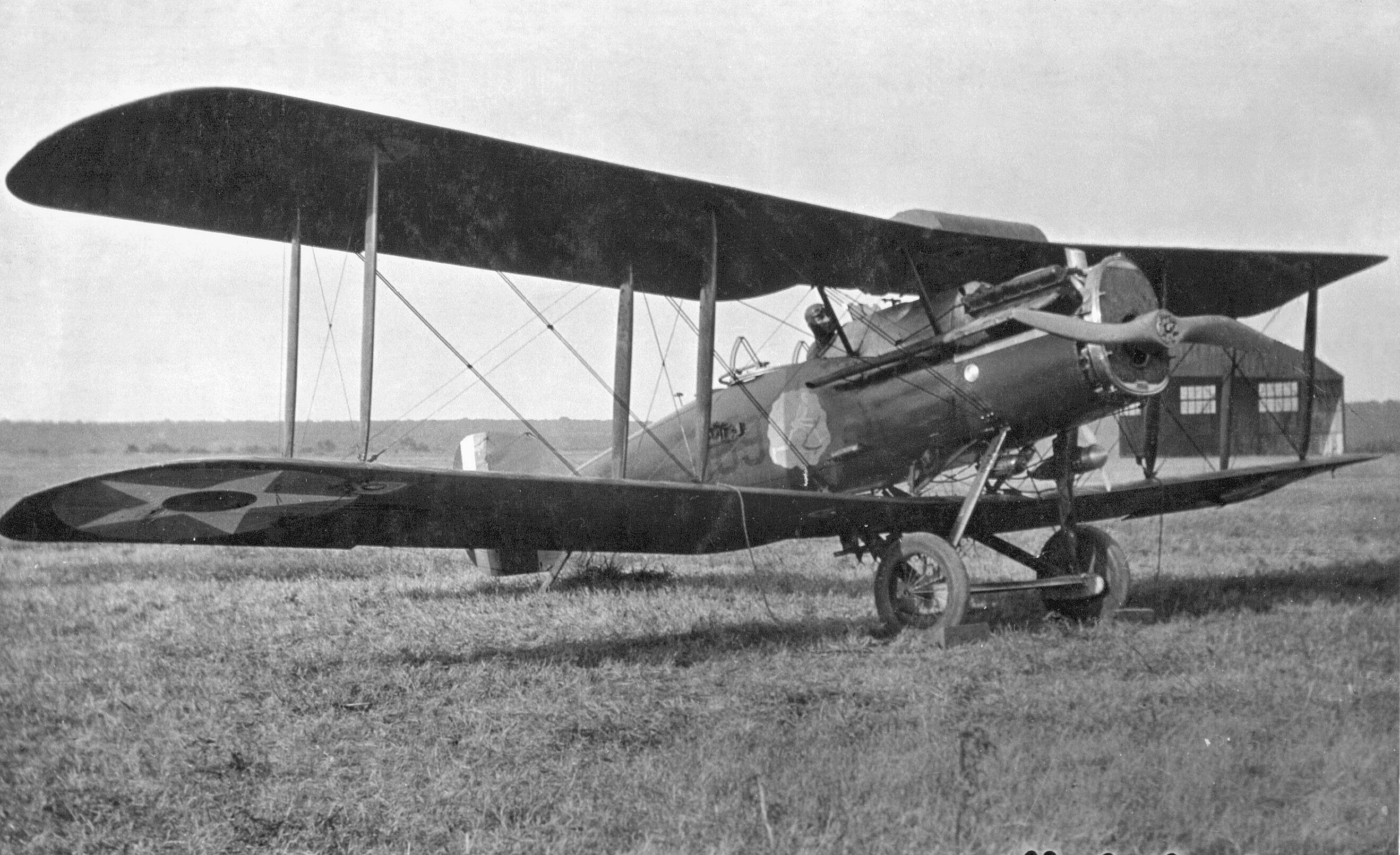
13th Squadron (Attack) - Dayton-Wright XB-1A, Kelly Field, Texas, 1921

When the US entered the war, the Aviation Section, U.S. Signal Corps of the United States Army lacked any competitive combat aircraft either in inventory or under construction. On 1 August 1917, General John Pershing, the commander of the American Expeditionary Forces on the Western Front, issued his personal recommendation for the Bristol Fighter to be built in the United States, leading to plans for the development and production of an American version of the Fighter by the United States Army Engineering Division.

Original proposals for American production had the 200 hp (149 kW) Hispano-Suiza engine. On 5 September 1917, a F.2B Fighter was delivered to the Smithsonian Institution, Washington, United States. Attempts to begin production in the United States floundered due to the decision by Colonel V. E. Clark of the Bolling Commission to redesign the Fighter to be powered by the 400 hp (298 kW) Liberty L-12 engine. The Liberty was unsuitable for the Bristol, as it was far too heavy and bulky, so that the aircraft was chronically nose-heavy.

A contract for 1,000 aircraft was placed initially with the Fisher Body Corporation then cancelled and reallocated to the Curtiss Aeroplane and Motor Company. On 7 December 1917, the order was doubled to 2,000 aircraft. On 25 January 1918, the first aircraft, which was given the name U.S.A 0-1, was completed, despite the misgivings of Barnwell, who was not satisfied with some of the modifications made, particularly in the use of the Liberty L-12 engine. According to Bruce, misdirections attributed to Major E. J. Hall of the U.S. Signals Corps had led to roughly 1,400 production drawings produced by Curtiss being rendered obsolete. The reputation of the type was also tarnished by three early crashes, although one had been attributed to pilot error and the other two to faulty workmanship. Only 27 O-1s were completed.

Efforts to change the engine of American-built Bristol Fighters to the more suitable Liberty 8 or the 300 hp (224 kW) Wright-Hisso came up against political as well as technical problems. By July 1918, the only specimen of the American-built Hispano-Suiza engine had been installed in a Fighter; the combination soon gained the favour of the U.S. Air Board, which suggested to Curtiss that all work on the 400 hp Liberty L-12 version of the aircraft be abandoned in favour of the Hispano-Suiza version. In spite of protests by Curtiss, the contracts for the U.S.A. 0-1 were terminated, leading to only a pair of prototypes and 25 production aircraft out of the planned 2,000 aircraft being constructed.

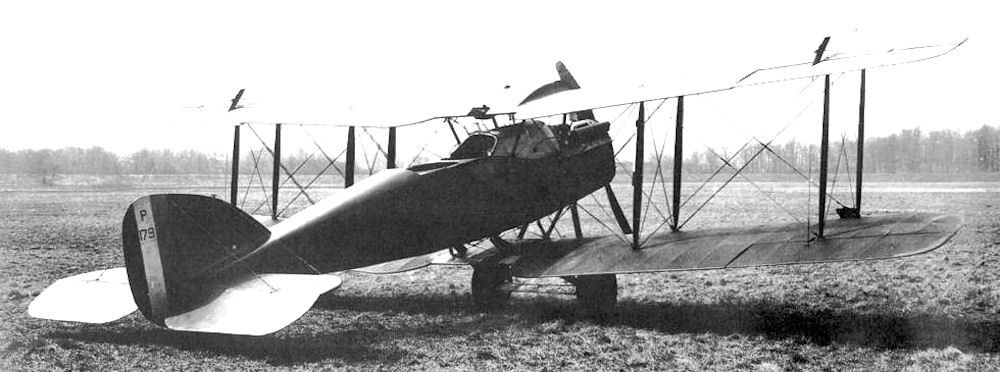
XB-1A 64158/P-179 at McCook Field, Ohio

W. C. Potter, Assistant Director of Aircraft Production, suggested that the original Bristol Fighter should be produced exactly as per Barnwell's original design, save for the use of either the Liberty 8 or Hispano-Suiza engine. Potter's proposal was overlooked; instead it was decided to produce eight aircraft, four being fitted with the Hispano-Suiza engine, as the Engineering Division USB-1A and four being powered by the Liberty L-8 engine, as the Engineering Division USB-1B; only one each were built.

In 1918, the Dayton-Wright Company designed a modified version, designated as the B-1A or XB-1A which used a 330 hp Wright-Hispano engine in a "new fuselage of wood-veneer monocoque construction". A later version was designated as the XB-1B and was equipped with the same engine. The XB-1A was armed with a pair of Marlin machine guns at the pilot's position while the XB-1B was armed with a pair of Browning machine guns. These aircraft were reportedly intended for use as night observation aircraft. Three prototypes were built by the Engineering division at McCook Field, with a further 44 aircraft built by the Dayton-Wright Company. According to Bruce, despite substantial efforts to differentiate and modify the aircraft's design, none of the American-built Fighters performed any better than the original Bristol. While some of the modified versions of the F.2 were used in the US, no American-built Bristol Fighters reached the American Expeditionary Forces in France.

=== Postwar developments ===
Postwar developments of the F.2B included the F.2B Mk II, a two-seat army co-operation biplane, fitted with desert equipment and a tropical cooling system, which first flew in December 1919, of which 435 were built. The Type 96 Fighter Mk III and Type 96A Fighter Mk VI were structurally strengthened aircraft, of which 50 were built in 1926–1927. Surplus F.2Bs were modified for civilian use. The Bristol Tourer was an F.2B fitted with a Siddeley Puma engine in place of the Falcon and with canopies over the cockpits; The Tourer had a maximum speed of 128 mph (206 km/h).

== Operational history ==
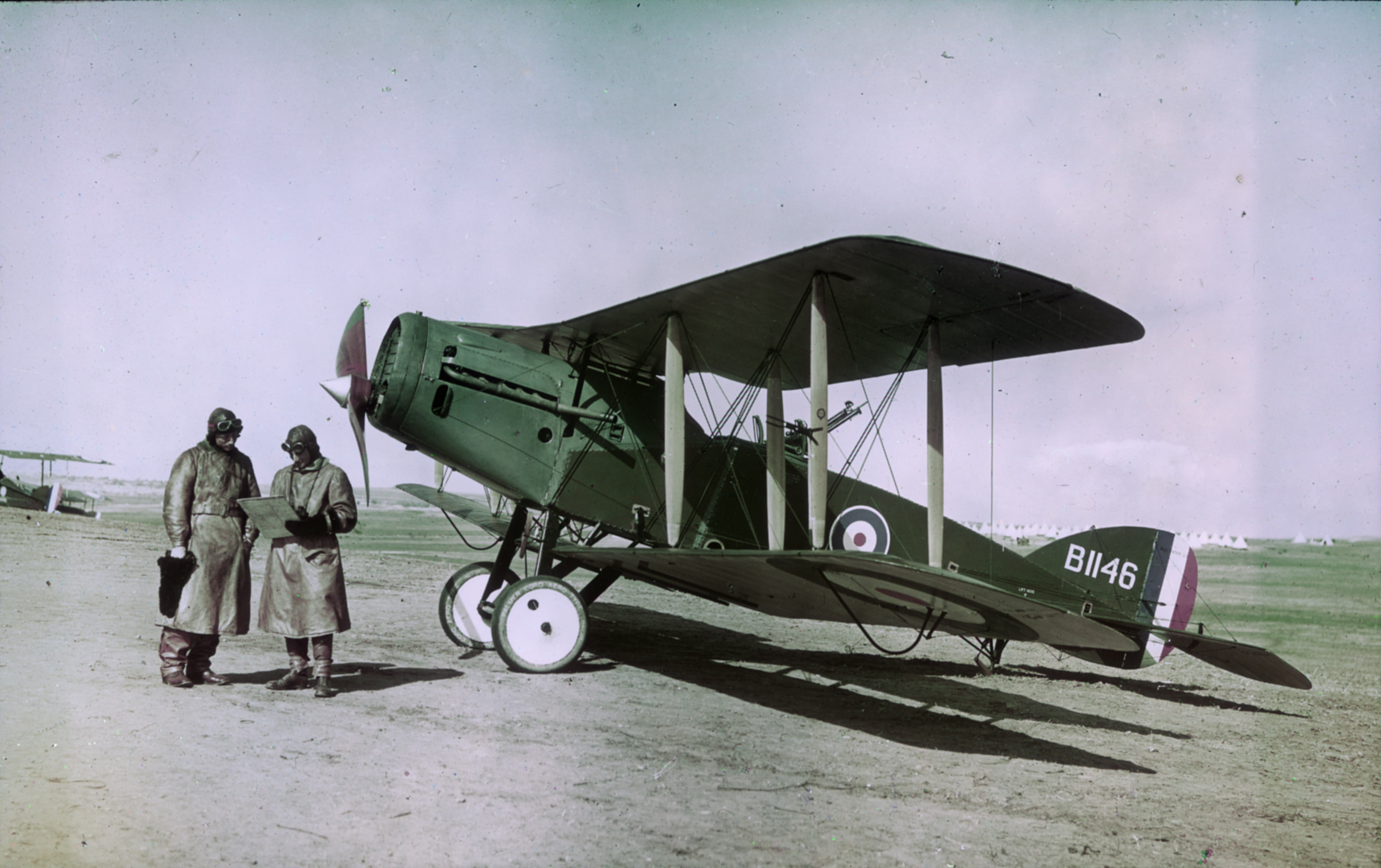
A Bristol F.2B Fighter of 1 Squadron Australian Flying Corps flown by Ross Smith in Palestine, February 1918.

Days prior to Christmas 1916, the first deliveries of production F.2A Fighters were completed, 48 Squadron at Rendcomb being the first operational unit of the Royal Flying Corps (RFC) to receive the type. On 8 March 1917, 48 Squadron was transferred to France in preparation for action on the Western Front; Hugh Trenchard, 1st Viscount Trenchard was keen to get the F.2A Fighter and other new aircraft ready for the Second Battle of Arras, aiming to surprise German forces with a new type, and this led to restriction on its deployment prior to the battle to avoid alerting the Germans.

The first offensive action that involved the F.2A Fighter crossing the frontline occurred on 5 April 1917, which had been timed to coincide with the British offensive at Arras. The very first F.2A patrol of six aircraft from 48 Squadron RFC, led by William Leefe Robinson VC, ran into five Albatros D.IIIs from Jasta 11 led by Manfred von Richthofen. Four out of the six F.2As were shot down – including that of Robinson, who was captured – and a fifth was badly damaged.

Other early experiences with the F.2A Fighter contributed to doubts over its effectiveness. The month in which the type had been introduced to offensive operations became known as Bloody April; casualties were high throughout the RFC and the Bristol fighter proved to be no exception. Contemporary two-seater aircraft were far less nimble than fighter aircraft, and many types lacked the structural strength to carry out the aggressive manoeuvres needed for dogfighting. The first "Brisfit" aircrews were accustomed to the standard doctrine of maintaining formation and using the crossfire of the observers' guns to counter enemy fighter aircraft.

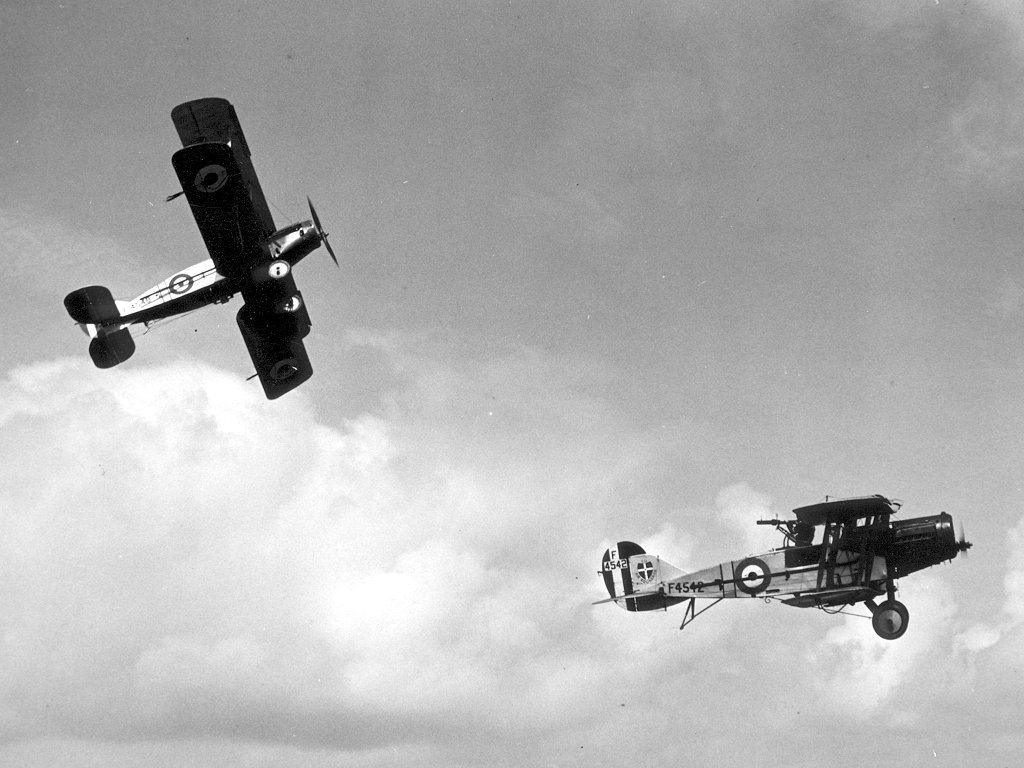
A pair of Bristol Fighters in flight

From May 1917 onwards, the definitive F.2B Fighter quickly supplanted the earlier F.2A model. In July 1917, the War Office decided to adopt the F.2B Fighter as the equipment of all fighter-reconnaissance squadrons, leading to a significant increase in production. Despite the issuing of contracts for further large batches of aircraft, it was apparent that the rate of production could not keep up with demand for the type.

Perhaps one of the best known flying aces to use the type was Canadian Andrew McKeever, and his regular observer L. F. Powell. By the end of 1917 McKeever had accumulated 30 victories and Powell had achieved eight, while operating the Fighter. McKeever later became a flying instructor stationed in England before becoming the commanding officer of 1 Squadron of the new Royal Canadian Air Force (RCAF), where he continued to use the Fighter as his personal aircraft, which was later transferred to Canada.

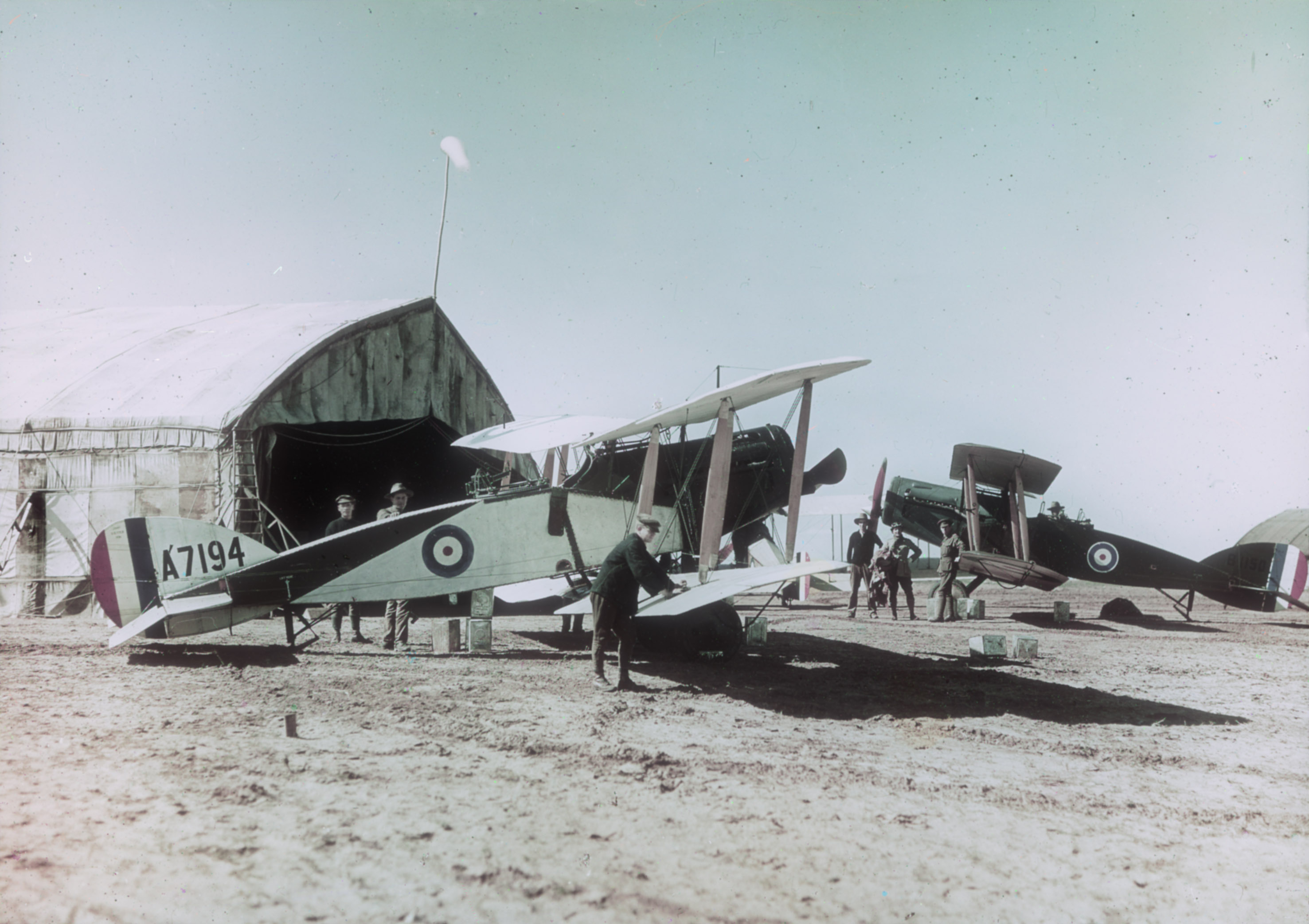
Bristol F2B fighters: A7194 in an overall aluminium ("silver") dope and B1150 in standard khaki-green. No. 1 Squadron, Australian Flying Corps. Mejdel Jaffa Area, Palestine in 1918

Near the end of the war, the Bristol Fighter was used in a pioneering new capability in the form of radio communications; 11 Squadron was the first such squadron to be equipped. Only the flight commander's Fighter would be equipped with a transmitter while others were outfitted with receivers, allowing for one-way communication of orders; as the trailing aerials employed needed to be wound in prior to aerial combat, this requirement reduced the usefulness of the system. The Fighter also participated in experiments held by the Royal Aircraft Establishment (RAE) into the use of parachutes, resulting in several aircraft being modified to carry static-line parachutes within the underside of the fuselage; these trials continued following the signing of the Armistice.

In September and October 1917, orders for 1,600 F.2B Fighters were placed; by the end of the First World War, the Royal Air Force (RAF) had a total of 1,583 F.2Bs in squadron service; it was in service with six reconnaissance squadrons stationed in France and five Home Defence squadrons, while further squadrons operated the type in the Middle East and Italy. In total, 5,329 aircraft were eventually constructed, mostly by Bristol but also by Standard Motors, Armstrong Whitworth and even the Cunard Steamship Company. According to Bruce, by the time of the Armistice of 11 November 1918, the "Bristol Fighter ended the war supreme in its class".

=== Postwar ===
Following the end of the war, the F.2B Fighter was soon adopted by the RAF as its standard army cooperation machine. The type continued to operate in army cooperation and light bombing roles in the British Empire, in particular the Middle East and India. In line with this role, which led to its use in a hot climate, Bristol introduced models of the Fighter equipped with 'tropical' radiators and provision for desert equipment. There had also been considerations made into deploying the Fighter as a carrier-based aircraft, which led to an engineless airframe participating in immersion trials in November 1918 and an aircraft being used in deck landing tests, reportedly on board HMS Eagle.

It was not until 1932 that the F.2B was withdrawn from RAF service, the last "Brisfit" unit being 20 Squadron stationed in India. The type lasted a further three years in New Zealand. Surplus aircraft were allocated to ADC Aircraft, a British company established to act as a seller for wartime aircraft, which passed on large quantities of Fighters to other nations, normally to military operators. Bristol also continued to manufacture and refurbish the type for some time. During the 1920s Bristol proceeded to develop and introduce numerous variants and derivatives of the Fighter, typically capable of carrying higher loads, with revised tail units and strengthened undercarriages.

The F.2B Fighter was adopted by the New Zealand Permanent Air Force and the Royal Australian Air Force (RAAF), as well as by the air forces of Belgium, Canada, Ireland, Greece, Mexico, Norway, Peru, Spain and Sweden. According to Bruce, relatively few Fighters entered service with the air forces of the various Commonwealth nations, greater quantities having been sold to other nations. Belgium purchased several from ADC Aircraft, and later arranged to produce the Fighter under licence at Sociétés Anonyme Belge de Constructions Aéronautiques (SABCA).

In 1920 Poland bought 106 Bristol Fighters (104 with Hispano-Suiza 300 hp/220 kW engines, two with Falcon IIIs) (other sources claim 107). Thus it became the second largest user of this type. It was also one of the most numerous Polish aircraft at that time. Forty Fighters were used during the Polish-Soviet War from July 1920, among others in the Battle of Warsaw, performing reconnaissance and close air support. The rest of the order became operational only after the end of hostilities. During the war, a pair were shot down by ground fire, while another was captured by the Soviets and several more were lost in crashes. Survivors of the conflict continued in Polish service in the reconnaissance and training roles until 1932.

== Operators ==
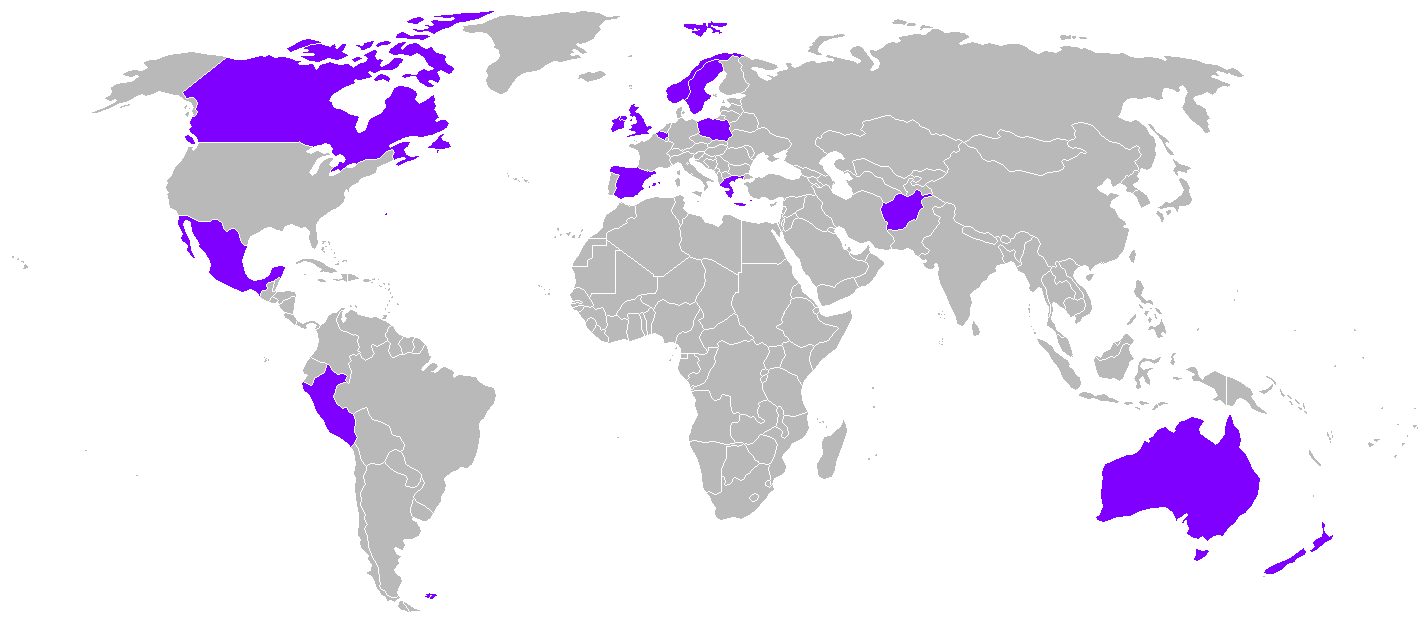
Bristol F.2 Fighter operators

Afghanistan

- Afghan Air Force operated three aircraft from 1919 and retired them by 1929.

Argentina

- Argentine Army Aviation Service - purchased 28 aircraft from 1920 to 1924, with a further 10 built under license by FMA from 1930 to 1931. (Note: According to Rivas, while Argentina acquired a license to build the F.2B, these 10 aircraft were rebuilt from existing Argentine F.2Bs that had been written off in accidents.) Retired in 1932.

Australia

- Australian Flying Corps operated the Bristol Fighter from 1917 to 1918.
  - No. 1 Squadron in Palestine
  - No. 6 (Training) Squadron in the United Kingdom

Belgium

- Belgian Air Force

Bolivia

- Bolivian Air Force

Canada

- Canadian Air Board
- Royal Canadian Air Force

Honduras

- Honduran Air Force - Honduras received a single F2.B in 1921, its first military aircraft. It was burned during an attempted revolution in 1924.

Ireland

- Irish Air Service
- Irish Air Corps

Greece

- Hellenic Air Force
- Hellenic Navy

Mexico

- Mexican Air Force

New Zealand

- New Zealand Permanent Air Force operated seven Bristol F.2B Fighters from 1919 to 1936. During its 16 years of service with the NZPAF, it was used as an army co-operation, aerial-survey and advanced training aircraft.

Norway

- Norwegian Army Air Service purchased five aircraft in 1922.

Peru

- Peruvian Air Force - Three F.2Bs were purchased in 1921. They were grounded by engine problems and a lack of spare parts in 1923 and scrapped.

Poland

- Polish Air Force operated 107 Bristol F.2B Fighters in 1920–1932.

Soviet Union

- Soviet Air Force operated two aircraft.

Kingdom of Spain

- Aeronáutica Militar

Sweden

- Royal Swedish Air Force operated one aircraft only

Kingdom of Yugoslavia

- Royal Yugoslav Air Force operated one aircraft only.

United Kingdom

- Royal Flying Corps / Royal Air Force

  - No. 2 Squadron RAF
  - No. 4 Squadron RAF
  - No. 5 Squadron RAF
  - No. 6 Squadron RAF
  - No. 8 Squadron RAF
  - No. 9 Squadron RAF
  - No. 10 Squadron RAF
  - No. 11 Squadron RAF
  - No. 12 Squadron RAF
  - No. 13 Squadron RAF
  - No. 14 Squadron RAF
  - No. 16 Squadron RAF
  - No. 20 Squadron RAF

  - No. 22 Squadron RAF
  - No. 24 Squadron RAF
  - No. 28 Squadron RAF
  - No. 31 Squadron RAF
  - No. 33 Squadron RAF
  - No. 34 Squadron RAF
  - No. 35 Squadron RAF
  - No. 36 Squadron RAF
  - No. 39 Squadron RAF
  - No. 48 Squadron RAF
  - No. 62 Squadron RAF
  - No. 67 Squadron RAF
  - No. 75 Squadron RAF

  - No. 76 Squadron RAF
  - No. 81 Squadron RAF
  - No. 88 Squadron RAF
  - No. 100 Squadron RAF
  - No. 105 Squadron RAF
  - No. 111 Squadron RAF
  - No. 114 Squadron RAF
  - No. 138 Squadron RAF
  - No. 139 Squadron RAF
  - No. 140 Squadron RAF
  - No. 141 Squadron RAF
  - No. 186 Squadron RAF
  - No. 208 Squadron RAF

== Surviving aircraft ==
There were three airworthy Bristol Fighters in 2007 (and several replicas):

- The Shuttleworth Collection at Old Warden, Biggleswade, Beds., UK owns F.2B Fighter, serial number D8096, that still flies during the British summer.
- The Canada Aviation and Space Museum, in Ottawa, Ontario, Canada, owns a second example, D7889.
- The New Zealand film director Peter Jackson owns D8084, which flies from the Hood Aerodrome, in Masterson. The Omaka Aviation Heritage Centre, at Omaka Aerodrome, Blenheim holds a second, original fuselage.

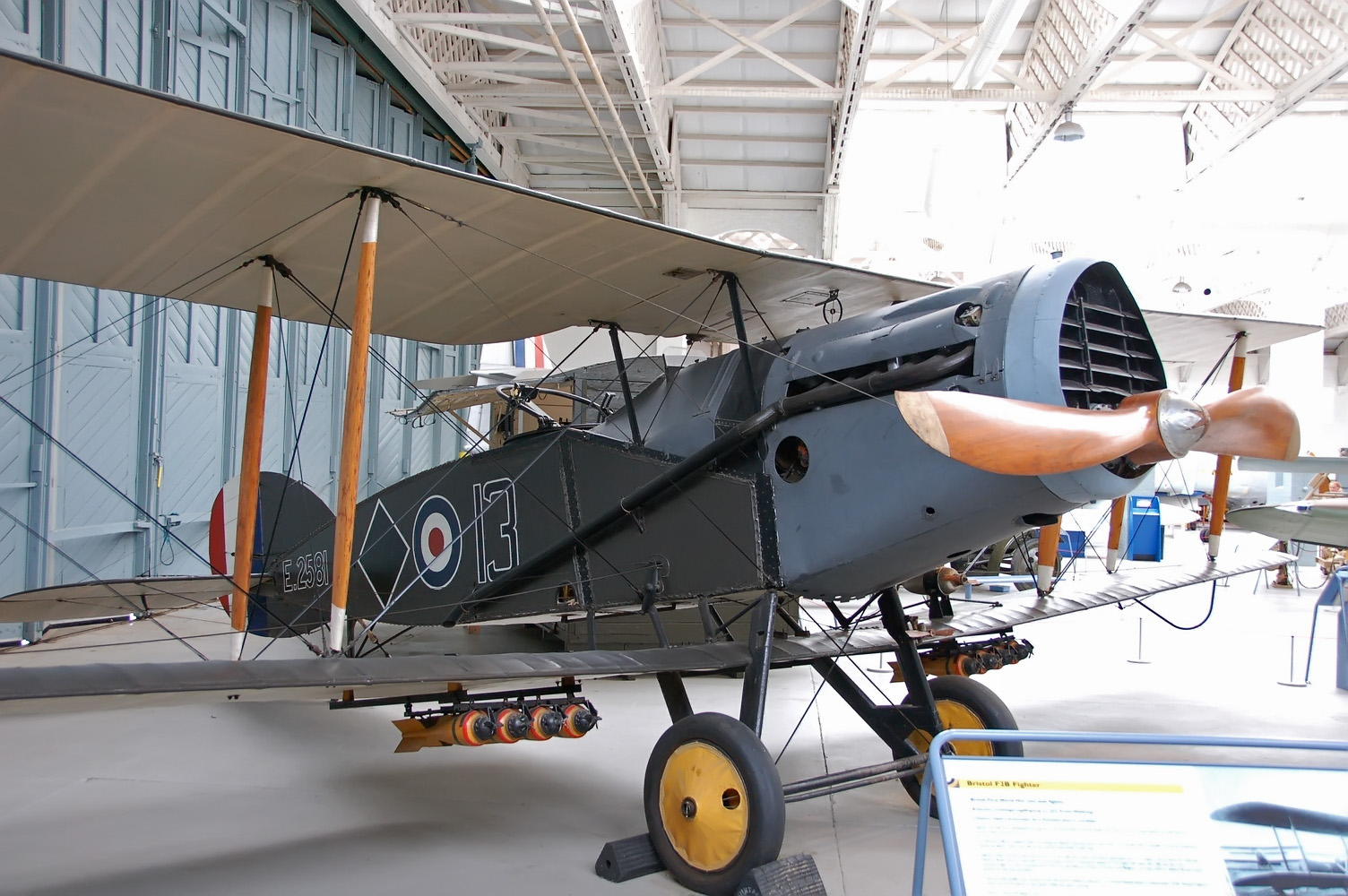
A Bristol F.2 Fighter preserved at the Imperial War Museum Duxford

Substantially original aircraft are on static display at the:

- Royal Air Force Museum London, UK - serial number E2466 (BAPC.165)
- Imperial War Museum Duxford, UK - serial number E2581
- Museo del Aire, Madrid, Spain - serial number B.21
- Musée Royal de l'Armée, Brussels, Belgium - Type 17, 66
- Polish Aviation Museum, Kraków - serial number H1279 / 20.48

Restorations of original airframes include:

- A fuselage being rebuilt into a flyable aircraft by the Ross Walton Family Collection, Bardstown, Kentucky, USA.
- In 2016, Aerospace Bristol, Filton Airfield, Bristol, UK, purchased an airframe (BAPC.386) from a private collection in the US for restoration and display in its new museum. This sale was erroneously reported to be from Ross Walton.

Wing structure of F.2 at RAF Museum London

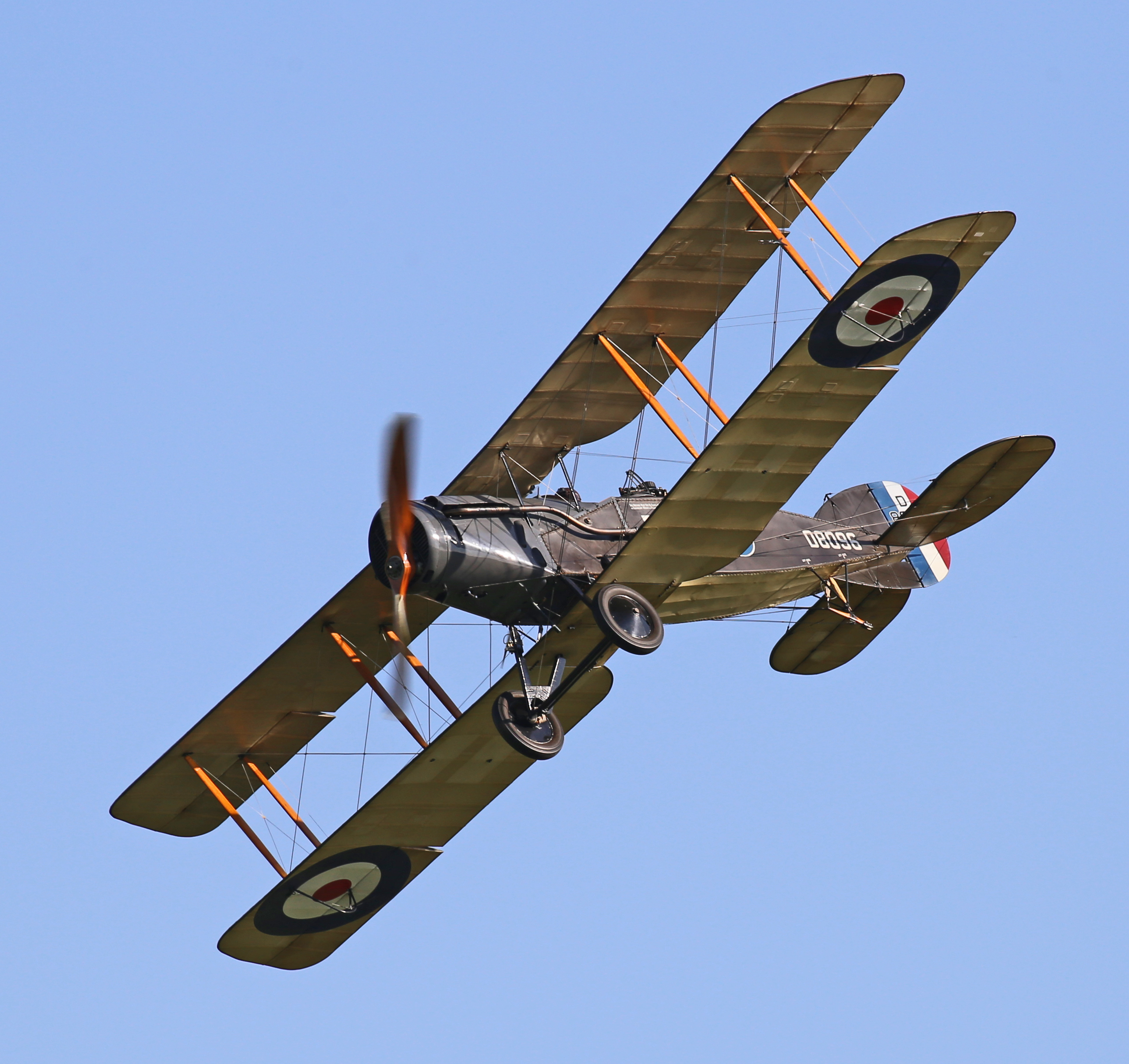
F2B of the Shuttleworth Collection in flight

In addition, various replicas are operated or displayed in locations around the world, including a full-scale replica F.2B serialled A7288 (BAPC.387) built by engineers at Rolls-Royce, Airbus and GKN Aerospace-Filton in 2010 in celebration of 100 years of aircraft manufacture at Filton, Bristol, where the original Fighters were designed and built.

== Specifications (F.2B) ==
Data from Aircraft Profile No. 21: The Bristol Fighter

General characteristics

- Crew: 2
- Length: 25 ft 10 in (7.87 m)
- Wingspan: 39 ft 3 in (11.96 m)
- Height: 9 ft 9 in (2.97 m)
- Wing area: 405 sq ft (37.6 m^{2})
- Empty weight: 2,145 lb (973 kg)
- Max takeoff weight: 3,243 lb (1,471 kg)
- Powerplant: 1 × Rolls-Royce Falcon III V-12 liquid-cooled piston engine, 275 hp (205 kW)
- Propellers: 2-bladed fixed-pitch propeller

Performance

- Maximum speed: 123 mph (198 km/h, 107 kn)
- Range: 369 mi (594 km, 321 nmi)
- Service ceiling: 18,000 ft (5,500 m)
- Rate of climb: 889 ft/min (4.52 m/s)

Armament

- Guns: ** 1 × .303 in (7.7 mm) forward-firing Vickers machine gun in the upper fuselage
  - 1 or 2 × .303 in Lewis Guns in the observer's cockpit
- Bombs: 240 lb (110 kg)

== See also ==
Related development

- AME VI
- Bristol M.R.1
- Bristol Tourer

Aircraft of comparable role, configuration, and era

- Packard-Le Père LUSAC-11
