= Mount Iron Aerodrome =

Former aerodrome in Wānaka, New Zealand

Mount Iron Aerodrome was an aerodrome in Wānaka, New Zealand.

The original 'Pembroke' town airport was established in the 1940s at the base of Mt Iron, a large prominent rocky hill at the entrance to Wānaka just beneath the site of Puzzling World Amusement Centre. It had an 800 m (2,600 ft) compacted grass runway with day markers. A small terminal building supported the local sightseeing airline, Aspiring Air, with regular viewing flights to the upper reaches of Lake Wānaka and Mount Aspiring / Tititea. The little airstrip also provided a link to Makarora and Haast. Regular sightseeing aircraft were usually Cessna 206 and de Havilland Canada Beavers.

As tourism began to take hold in earnest in the early 1980s, the Mt Iron site became too restrictive due to growth of the town, the proximity of Mt Iron, and the fact that the largest aircraft that could safely land was the Britten-Norman Islander.

In 1984, it was decided to develop Sir Tim Wallis's private Luggate airstrip into what is today Wānaka Airport. The old Mt Iron aerodrome was disestablished as a public airstrip in 1986. It is still reasonably well defined today but is now being built over with a new road named Sir Tim Wallis Drive crossing over the old terminal access road.
