= New Zealand Fighter Pilots Museum =

Aerospace museum in Wānaka, New Zealand

Coordinates: 44.724082°S 169.243569°E

The New Zealand Fighter Pilots Museum was an aerospace museum located at Wānaka Airport in New Zealand's South Island. It closed in March 2011 and was replaced in December 2011 by the Warbirds & Wheels museum of military aircraft as well as classic and vintage automobiles and motorcycles.

The museum was founded by Sir Tim Wallis and housed in a new building at the Wānaka Airport. It was opened in 1993 by retired Group Captain Colin Gray. Its first curator was Ian Brodie. In 1996 museum became one of the first aerospace museums on the internet. The museum includes the Alpine Fighter Collection, dedicated to New Zealand's fighters during World War II. The museum was funded, in part, by grants from the Community Trust of Otago.

== Alpine Fighter Collection ==
The Alpine Fighter Collection is a collection of vintage aircraft based at the New Zealand Fighter Pilots Museum at Wānaka established by helicopter and deer entrepreneur Sir Tim Wallis.

The collection was started in 1984 with the purchase of a North American P-51 Mustang from John Dilley of the US. Painted in RNZAF colours, it attracted much media attention as the first flying Second World War fighter seen in New Zealand for some years and played a major part in the 1980s and 1990s expansion of the Warbird movement in New Zealand.

The collection undertook a pioneering effort in recovering and restoring Warbirds from the post-glasnost Commonwealth of Independent States. It arranged and funded the first restorations to flying condition of Polikarpov I-16s (six restored) and Polikarpov I-153s (three restored). It also restored the first Nakajima Ki-43 Hayabusa to fly since the 1940s.

In 1988, the collection's core members organized the first Warbirds over Wanaka airshow to showcase the collection - it attracted 14,000 people. The collection continues to provides the basis of the biannual Warbirds over Wanaka Airshow which attracted over 100,000 visitors in 2006.

The collection was reduced by sales in the later years. The sole airworthy component is a Hawker Hurricane Mk IIA, with a de Havilland Vampire FB5 and Royal Aircraft Factory S.E.5a reproduction on static display.

Amongst the aircraft that were eventually transferred to the new Warbirds & Wheels museum were the Hawker Hurricane and the replica S.E.5a.

== See also ==
- Warbirds and Wheels, Wānaka
- Royal New Zealand Air Force Museum

== Bibliography ==
- Brodie, Ian (2000). Warbirds - Alpine Fighter Collection. Auckland: Reed Publishing. ISBN 1-86948-833-4.
- Peat, Neville (2005). Hurricane Tim : The Story of Sir Tim Wallis (Hardback). Dunedin: Longarce Press. ISBN 1-877361-17-8.
