= WKA =

WKA may refer to:

- World Kickboxing Association (WKA)
- World Karting Association
- Wānaka Airport, New Zealand
- United States v. Wong Kim Ark, a U.S. Supreme Court case concerning citizenship
- Witch-King of Angmar, a character from the works of J.R.R. Tolkien
- Wright Kuruvilla Architects, a UK-based international architectural that designed the Burj Al Arab in Dubai
