= Omaka Aviation Heritage Centre =

- Location within New Zealand
- Established: 2006
- Location: Omaka Aerodrome, Blenheim, New Zealand
- Coordinates: 41.5379°S 173.9299°E
- Type: Aviation museum
- Website: www.omaka.org.nz

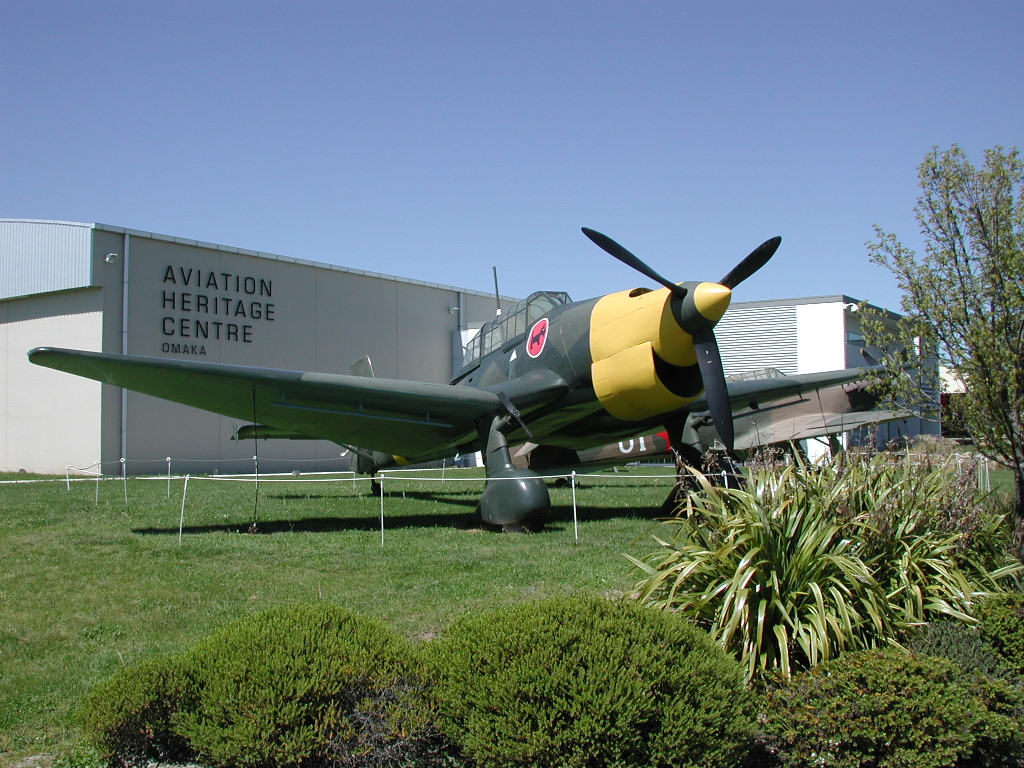
Stuka replica outside of museum

The Omaka Aviation Heritage Centre is an aviation museum located at the Omaka Aerodrome, 5 km (3 mi) from the centre of Blenheim, New Zealand.

== History ==
A resurgence of heritage aviation interest began in the Marlborough area in the late 1990s when a group of enthusiasts imported two Chinese Nanchang CJ-6 trainers and established the Marlborough Warbirds Association as a way to foster interest and provide a social network of support. As increasing numbers of aircraft were based at Omaka, word of their existence led to increasing numbers of tourists visiting the facilities. In 1997, a small group of aircraft owners and enthusiasts established the New Zealand Aviation Museum Trust to provide a means of making the aircraft accessible to the public on a more practical and sustainable basis while acting as catalyst to attract aviation business and investment to the Marlborough region and at the same time grow the public understanding and appreciation of aviation.

A decade of collaborative activity lead to the establishment of the Marlborough Aviation Cluster, incorporating an aviation business park and the heritage centre. The initiative received support from the Marlborough District Council and Marlborough Regional Development Trust. In addition NZ Trade and Enterprise in 2004 contributed NZ$2 million in funding as part of a Major Regional Initiative grant towards stage 1 of the heritage centre.

Stage One, featuring the World War I exhibition Knights of the Sky occupies a 3,000 m^{2} (32,000 sq ft) area and officially opened on 9 December 2006.

The centre received a $1.4 million from the Marlborough District Council in 2011 to pay off a loan, the interest of which was threatening to close it. In exchange, the centre had to fund an expansion without any public assistance.

The Blenheim Riverside Railway Society completed a narrow-gauge railway line to the centre in 2015.

Stage Two opened in November 2016.

The museum began planning for the next stage in 2018. The centre received $1.7 million from the Marlborough District Council in 2022 to help pay for the $5 million expansion. This would allow it to qualify for additional financial support from the Lottery Significant Projects Fund. In the meantime, in 2020, it received a Mosquito, P-40 and Tiger Moth from the John R. Smith collection.

== Exhibits ==
=== Knights of the Sky Exhibition ===
Omaka's first exhibition, 'Knights of the Sky', presents a large collections of World War I aircraft and memorabilia, including a mix of static displays along with flyable planes. The collection (which is on long term loan to the museum) is managed by the 14-18 Aviation Heritage Trust, which is chaired by film director Sir Peter Jackson. As a result of Jackson’s interest the exhibition, which was designed by Joe Bleakley, was able to employ the talents of set builders, painters and props specialists, in particular those of Wingnut Films and with lifelike mannequins by Wētā Workshop. Despite its complexity the exhibition took less than 10 weeks to complete from design to opening.

=== Dangerous Skies Exhibition ===
'Dangerous Skies' broadens the Omaka experience into the Second World War. As well as the Battle of Britain, visitors learn about the lesser-known stories of the war on the Eastern Front. Like the 'Knights of the Sky', this exhibition features mannequins made by Weta Workshop, and original, static and flyable aircraft in large dioramas.

== Collection ==
The museum's collection contains a wide variety of military aircraft from the First and Second World Wars as well as artefacts and personal items belonging to some of the most famous aviators of World War I including some items of Baron Manfred von Richthofen memorabilia.

=== Aircraft on display ===
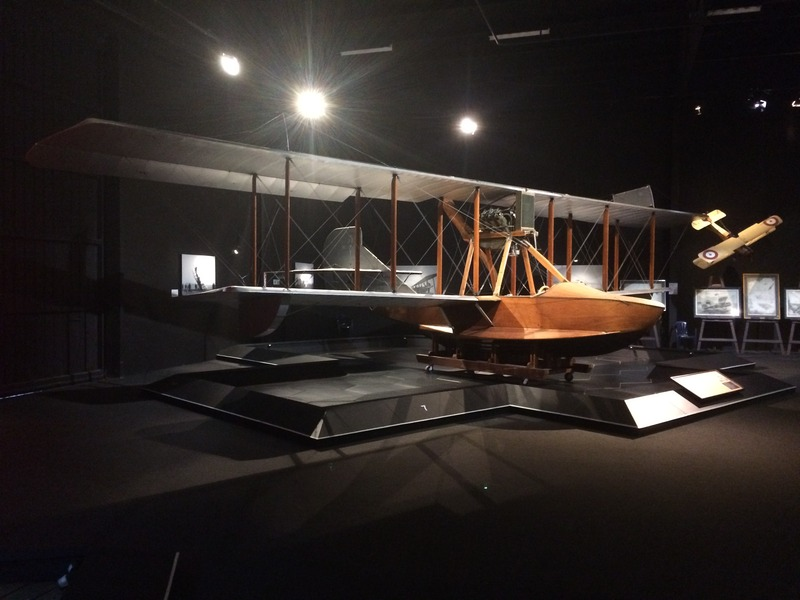
A Curtiss MF flying boat on display at the centre in 2017.

- Airco DH.2 – replica
- Airco DH-4
- Breguet 14 – replica
- Caproni Ca.22
- Curtiss Kittyhawk Mk IV NZ3220 "Gloria Lyons"
- Curtiss MF
- de Havilland Mosquito FB.VI NZ2336
- de Havilland Tiger Moth NZ1467/ZK-BQB
- Etrich Taube – replica
- Focke-Wulf Fw 190A – replica
- Fokker D.VIII
- Fokker Dr.I – replica
- Fokker Dr.I – replica
- Fokker Dr.I – replica
- Fokker Dr.I – replica
- Fokker E.III – replica
- Halberstadt D.IV – replica
- Hawker Hurricane – replica
- Junkers Ju 87 Stuka – replica
- Lockheed Hudson NZ2049
- Messerschmitt Bf 108
- Morane-Saulnier BB – replica
- Nieuport 24 – replica
- Nieuport 27 – replica
- Pfalz D.III – replica
- Royal Aircraft Factory S.E.5 – replica
- Royal Aircraft Factory R.E.8 – replica
- Siemens-Schuckert D.IV – replica
- Supermarine Spitfire Mk XIV
- Thomas-Morse S-4 Scout
- Yakovlev Yak-3 – replica

== Events ==
At Easter on alternate (odd) years to the Warbirds over Wanaka air show, the Omaka airfield plays host to an air show called Classic Fighters.

== See also ==
- List of aerospace museums
- Warbird
