= Aspiring Air =

New Zealand regional airline

IATA	ICAO	Call sign
OI	—	ASPIRING
- Founded: 1974
- Ceased operations: 7 July 2015
- Hubs: Wānaka Airport
- Fleet size: 4
- Destinations: Queenstown
- Headquarters: Wānaka, New Zealand
- Key people: Barrie McHaffie (managing director)
- Website: www.aspiringair.com

Aspiring Air was an airline based in Wānaka, New Zealand. It operated charter pleasure flights around New Zealand's Southern Alps and scheduled services three times daily to Queenstown, connecting with Air New Zealand. Its main base was Wānaka Airport.

== Code data ==
- IATA Code: OI

== History ==
The airline was established in 1974, was wholly owned by Barrie McHaffie (Managing Director) and had 8 employees Aspiring Air started scheduled services from Wānaka to Christchurch in 1984 using a Cessna 207 aircraft. The flight took 90 minutes each way and had to be flown during daylight hours due to IFR rules. Later on a stop in Cromwell was added to the service. The airline was closed down on 7 July 2015.

== Destinations ==
Aspiring Air operated scheduled services between Wānaka and Queenstown (at March 2007).

== Fleet ==
In 1986 the Aspiring Air fleet consisted of two aircraft.

- 1 Cessna 207 Skywagon
- 1 Cessna A185F Skywagon

The Aspiring Air fleet consisted of the following aircraft in November 2012:

- 2 Britten-Norman BN2A Islander
- 1 Cessna 177 Cardinal
- 1 Cessna 172 Skyhawk

== Accidents and incidents ==
- On 8 August 1989, Nine passengers and the pilot died when the Britten-Norman Islander they were in crashed into terrain in the Upper Dart Valley.

== See also ==
- List of defunct airlines of New Zealand
- History of aviation in New Zealand
