= Bristol M.R.1 =

M.R.1
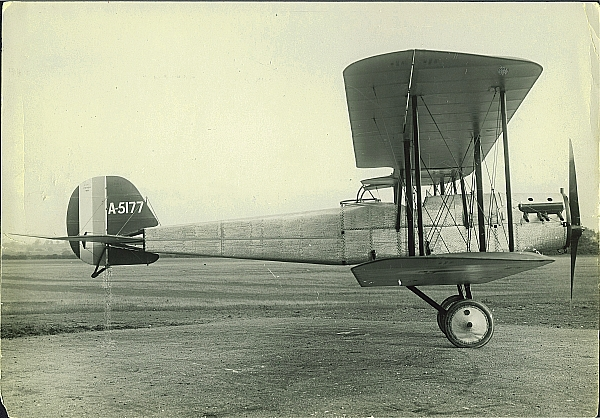

General information
- Type: Experimental metal reconnaissance
- National origin: United Kingdom
- Manufacturer: The British & Colonial Aeroplane Co. Ltd
- Designer: Frank Barnwell
- Number built: 2

History
- First flight: 1917

The Bristol M.R.1 was an experimental biplane with an aluminium monocoque fuselage and metal wings, produced by Bristol during the First World War. Two were built to government order.

== Development ==
Early in the development of powered flight, some manufacturers were beginning to consider the use of metal in airframes to replace wood. Metal structures, even fabric-covered metal frames, offered greater robustness for handling and transportation as well as better resistance to tropical climates, and some designers could see the possibilities of metal skinning, stressed or not, for aerodynamically-clean cantilever wings and advanced monocoque fuselages. There was a realisation too, that mild steel, familiar from bicycle manufacture but with a low strength-to-weight ratio, was not going to be the material of choice once the problems of joining aluminium alloy members together and preventing their corrosion had been solved. Vickers in the UK were one of the first to make steel-framed and sparred aircraft that flew, with their series of R.E.P-type monoplanes no.s 1-8 produced between 1911 and 1913. In Germany, Junkers produced the first true all-metal (for years, aircraft with fabric-clad metal frames were described as all-metal, but the Junkers was steel-skinned as well) aircraft, the Junkers J.1, flown in 1915. Bristol's first draft designs for metal aircraft date from 1914, but it was not until the increase of aircraft production during the First World War began to put pressure on the supply of high-grade timber that there was official interest. During 1916 Bristol's designer, Frank Barnwell submitted a design for a metal two-seat reconnaissance aircraft, the M.R.1 (M.R. for Metal Reconnaissance) and gained a contract for two evaluation aircraft.

The fuselage construction was quite novel. Barnwell borrowed from marine experience by using duralumin sheet, varnished to prevent corrosion and used these to make the fuselage in four sections. The two forward sections were semi-monocoque (i.e. open channels) with braced longitudinal upper members which, bolted together, held the engine, a water-cooled inline upright 140 hp (100 kW) Hispano-Suiza) and the pilot's cockpit. Aft, two more sections, both true monocoques, held the observer and carried the tail unit. The two cockpits were close together, with the pilot under the wing at mid-chord and the observer under a trailing edge cutout; Barnwell proposed that the short observer's fuselage section should be removable to turn the M.R.1 into a single-seater, though this configuration was not realised. The monocoque sections were very early examples of double-skinned construction, with a smooth outer skin riveted to a longitudinally-corrugated inner skin. The detailed design was by W.T.Read. The complete fuselage was of round-cornered rectangular cross-section and quite slender, mounted between the wings. The M.R.1 was a two-bay biplane without stagger or sweep, with ailerons on both planes. Aluminium wing spars proved difficult to make sufficiently rigid and Bristol outsourced their manufacture to The Steel Wing Company at Gloucester, who had built experimental steel wings for other aircraft.

With the fuselage of the first M.R.1 completed before the wings, Bristol decided to make a set of conventional wooden wings, with ailerons only on the upper planes, for flight trials in mid-1917. These went well and the aircraft was handed over to the Air Board in October 1917. The second M.R.1 did not fly until late in 1918 when the metal wings were at last ready, powered by a 180 hp (130 kW) Wolseley Viper engine. It was damaged beyond repair at the end of its delivery flight to the Royal Aircraft Establishment in April 1919. The first M.R.1 was fitted with metal wings by 1918 and continued to provide useful information on metal airframe construction. In 1923, Bristol's rationalisation of type numbers labelled the M.R.1 the Type 13.

== Specifications ==
Data from Barnes 1964, p. 129 Unfortunately Barnes did not state which engine the following specifications apply to, nor if the metal or wooden wings were used.

General characteristics

- Crew: two
- Length: 27 ft 0 in (12.85 m)
- Wingspan: 42 ft 2 in (8.23 m)
- Height: 10 ft 3 in (3.12 m)
- Wing area: 458 sq ft (42.6 m^{2})
- Empty weight: 1,700 lb (770 kg)
- Gross weight: 2,810 lb (1,275 kg)

Performance

- Maximum speed: 110 mph (177 km/h, 96 kn)
- Endurance: 5 hours
