= Omaka Aerodrome =

Airfield near Blenheim, New Zealand

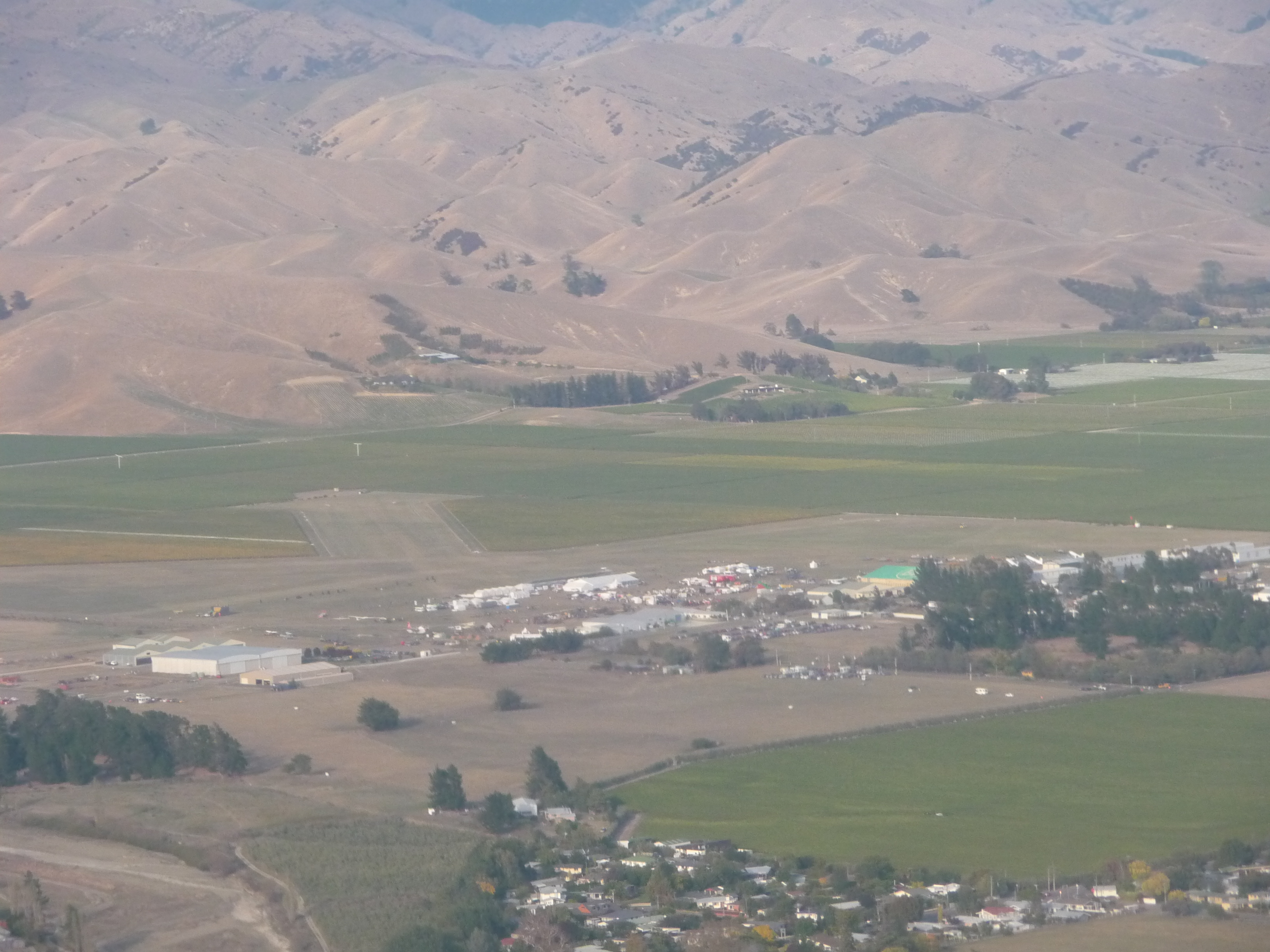
- Aerial view of the aerodrome, 2015
- IATA: none; ICAO: NZOM

Summary
- Airport type: Privately owned, Public Use
- Operator: Marlborough Aero Club
- Location: Omaka Aerodrome, Blenheim, New Zealand
- Elevation AMSL: 100 ft / 30 m
- Coordinates: 41°32′24″S 173°55′19″E

Map
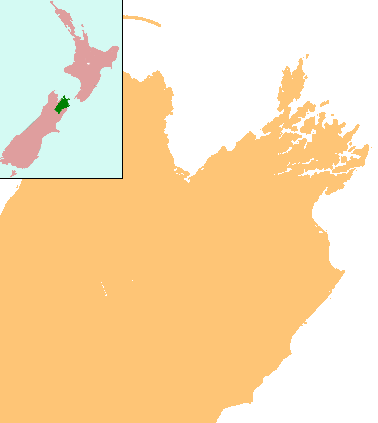
- Location of aerodrome in Marlborough

Runways
Direction	Length		Surface
Direction	ft	m	Surface
01/19	3,290	1,003	Grass
07/25	2,266	691	Grass
12/30	3,277	999	Grass

Omaka Aerodrome (ICAO: NZOM) is a private airfield located 2 nautical miles (3.7 km; 2.3 mi) southwest of Blenheim, New Zealand. It owned by the Marlborough Aero Club and used solely by general aviation.

It houses the Omaka Aviation Heritage Centre, established in 2006, which displays many vintage aircraft.

Since 2001, the Classic Fighters biennial airshow has taken place at Omaka. It is held on the Easter weekend of odd-numbered years. Each show is based on a different theme and typically includes mock air battles and other displays.

On 21 October 2023, a gyrocopter crashed in the Omaka Airfield, killing its only occupant.
