= New Caledonian Armed Forces =

Subdivision of the French armed forces

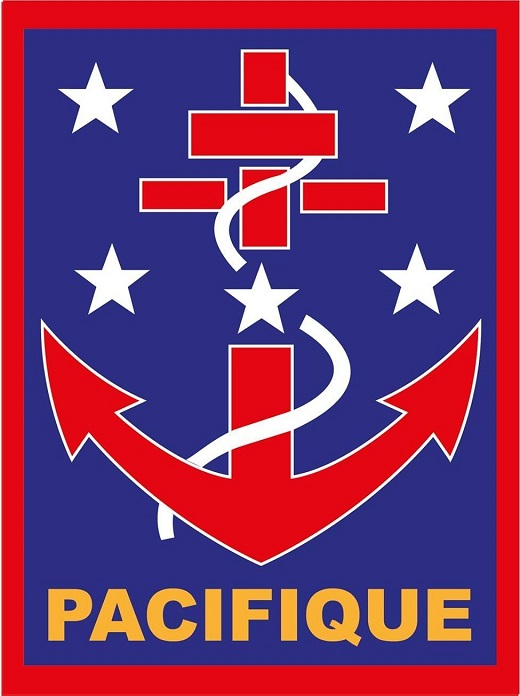
Insignia of New Caledonian Armed Forces

The New Caledonian Armed Forces (FANC) is the name by which the French Armed Forces based in New Caledonia are referred to and also is a subdivision of the French armed forces.

== Command ==
The FANC is commanded by the Commanding Officer FANC (COMSUP FANC), who is under the command of the Chief of the Defence Staff. The Commanding officer is usually a Brigade general. The command is headquartered in Nouméa.

== Composition ==
The forces number 1750 from the 3 branches of the armed forces (excluding the Gendarmerie) of which 1200 are permanent.

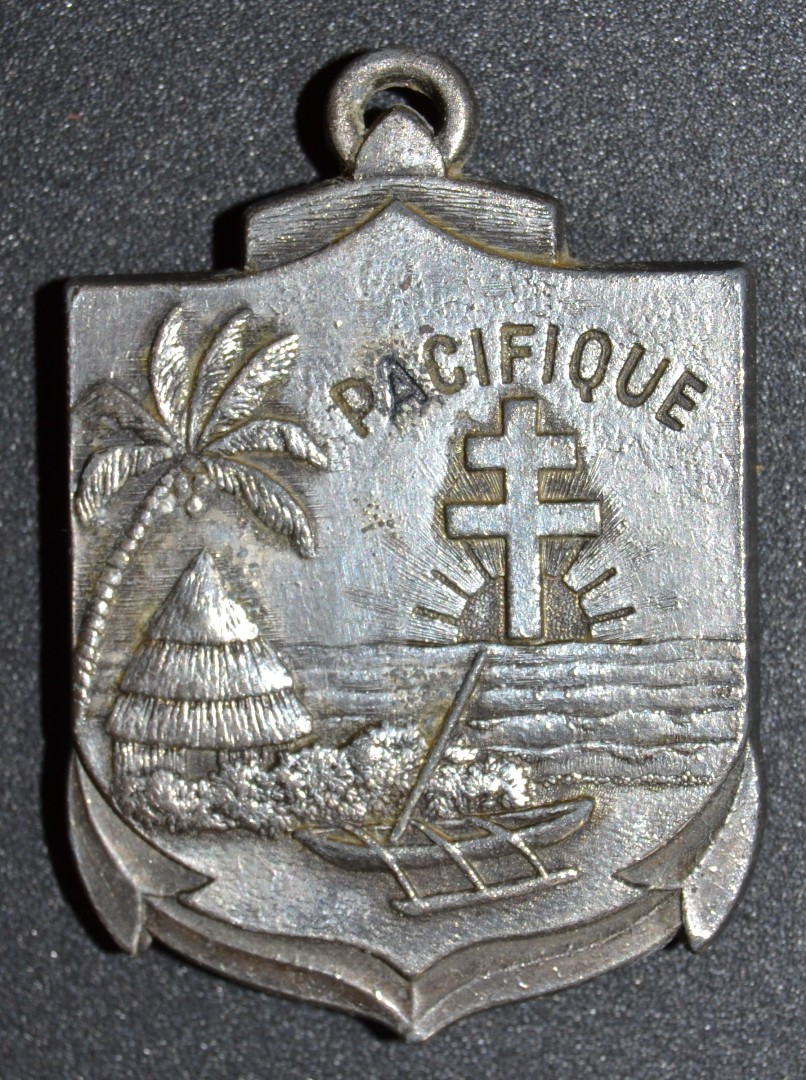
Insignia of the Pacific Marine Infantry Regiment of New Caledonia (RIMAP NC)

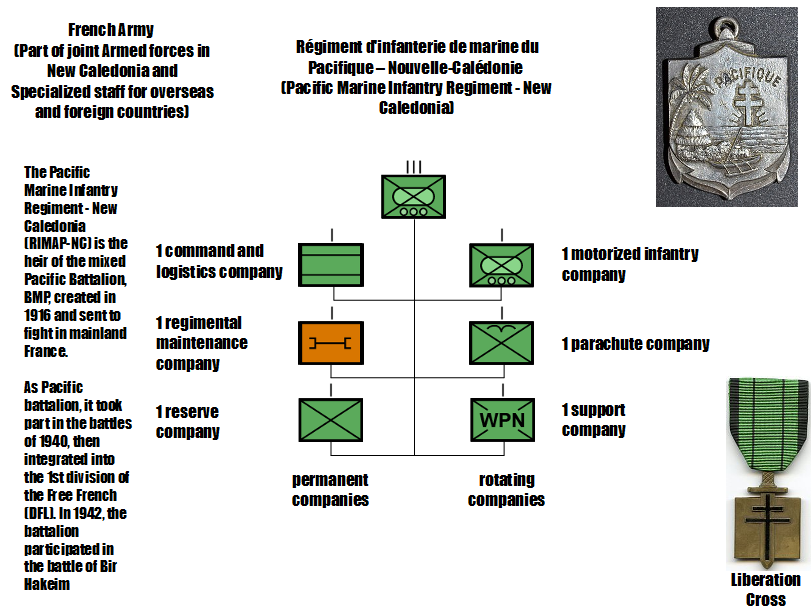
Order of battle of the Pacific Marine Infantry Regiment

- Army: The Pacific Marine Infantry Regiment (RIMAP-NC) has 3 bases. About 80 percent of the 700-member regiment is composed of soldiers on short-term (four month) deployments from metropolitan France. As of 2018, only about 30 personnel in the regiment were locally recruited.
- Navy: The naval forces incorporate several vessels of the French Navy including: one Floréal-class frigate, Vendémiaire, the patrol and support vessel D'Entrecasteaux and two vessels of the Félix Éboué class of patrol vessels, Auguste Benebig and Jean Tranape. One EDA-S landing craft (Sabre) is also deployed to support operations in the territory, along with two RP10-class harbour tugboats.
- Air Force and Naval Aviation: Based at the Paul Klein Air Base (BA 186). As of 2025/26, French naval aviation and air force elements in New Caledonia included two Navy Falcon 200 Gardian maritime surveillance aircraft (drawn from Flotilla 25F), which, as of 2025/26 are being replaced, on an interim basis, by the more advanced Falcon 50 aircraft. These aircraft will in turn be superseded by the new Falcon 2000 Albatros starting in about 2030. Two Casa CN235 transport aircraft and three Puma helicopters from the Air Force's 52 "Tontouta" Squadron are also deployed in New Caledonia. Prior to 2022, the frigate Vendémiaire operated the Alouette III helicopter. However, with the retirement of the type in 2022, it is being replaced by the Eurocopter Dauphin N3. In 2022, the French Air Force demonstrated a capacity to reinforce the territory by deploying three Rafale fighters, supported by A400M transport aircraft and A330 MRTT Phénix tankers, from France to New Caledonia for a three-week exercise.

== Responsibilities ==
- National defence and security
- Protection of France's regional interests
- Support state policies in New Caledonia and Wallis et Futuna.
- Rescue missions
- Aid and cooperation with other states in the region

== Gendarmerie nationale ==
The paramilitary police has its own command structure. Some 855 personnel from the National Gendarmerie are stationed on the archipelago divided into 4 companies, 27 brigades and several specialized and mobile Gendarmerie units. During periods such the 2021 referendum on independence, these forces have been significantly reinforced with personnel deployed from metropolitan France. The air component includes two Écureuil helicopters while the Maritime Gendarmerie deploys the patrol boat Dumbea (P606) in the territory.

== See also ==
- French Armed Forces
- New Caledonia
- Troupes de marine
