= Tim Wallis =

New Zealand businessman (1938–2023)

Sir Tim Wallis
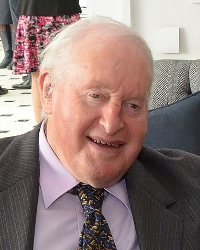
- Wallis in 2015
- Born: Timothy William Wallis; 9 September 1938; Greymouth, New Zealand
- Died: 17 October 2023 (aged 85)
- Education: Christ's College
- Occupation: Businessman
- Known for: Pioneering helicopter live deer recovery; Alpine Fighter Collection; Warbirds over Wanaka

Sir Timothy William Wallis (9 September 1938 – 17 October 2023) was a New Zealand businessman and aviation entrepreneur. He pioneered live deer capture from helicopters, which led to a significant industry in New Zealand. He was a leader and international representative of the deer farming industry. Wallis also founded the Alpine Fighter Collection and the Warbirds over Wanaka air show.

== Early life ==
He was born in Greymouth, on the West Coast, to Arthur Trevor and Janice Mildred (née Blunden) Wallis. He was the second of four children, George (March 1935), Adrian and Josephine. His father was a businessman with interests in the timber and sawmilling industry. Wallis's primary education was received at Grey Main School. For his high school education he attended Christ's College, Christchurch from 1952 to 1956 as a boarder. After completing a period of compulsory military training in 1957 he spent 2 terms as a medical student at the University of Canterbury before leaving to take a job at Kopara Sawmilling Company's Haupiri mill.

== Deer recovery and farming ==
Pioneer of the live deer recovery industry in New Zealand's South Island, Wallis built an aviation empire around helicopter operations, pulling valuable animals out of the rugged high country. For many years he held monopoly over the rights to commercial hunting in Fiordland National Park. Moving into deer farming during the 1970s, he was among the first to see the potential of the industry in New Zealand and his farm, Criffel, became a centre of excellence for high quality genetics and served as a model for many other farmers. The country's first deer auction was held on his farm in 1977. His company, Alpine Deer Group, forged trade relationships in Russia, Korea and Hong Kong that saw exports of velvet, antler and pizzle to Asia. In 1974 he pioneered the first exports of live deer to Taiwan, which in 1975 was followed by the first live deer exports to Korea. In 1976, Wallis purchased Mararoa station. This was sold in 1987 to Challenge Deer Park.

== Involvement in aviation ==
In 1965, Wallis bought his first helicopter, which he used for commercial work.

A long-time enthusiast, Wallis purchased and restored many World war II era fighter aircraft, establishing the Alpine Fighter Collection and the New Zealand Fighter Pilots Museum.

=== 1968 crash ===
On 7 July 1968 while flying a Hiller UH 12E with passengers Dick Burton and Lin Herron the helicopter hit 33 kV overhead power lines on Queenstown Hill station. As a result of the crash Wallis broke his back which required steel plates to be inserted in his spine. He remained partly paralysed in his left leg, which required him to use a steel (later titanium) calliper extending from the thigh to shoe. Wallis managed to continue his flying career despite the injury.

In 1984, Wallis purchased a North American P-51 Mustang from John Dilley of the USA. Painted in RNZAF colours, it attracted much media attention as the first flying Second World War fighter seen in New Zealand for some years and played a major part in the 1980s and 1990s expansion of the Warbird movement in New Zealand. The purchase of this aircraft caused him to establish the Alpine Fighter Collection.

=== Spitfire purchase ===
In October 1988, Wallis sold his P-51D Mustang which allowed him to purchase a Supermarine Spitfire Mk XVI, RAF serial TB863 from Stephen Grey in England. He obtained his rating on the aircraft at RNZAF Base Whenuapai in Auckland with the help of Stephen Grey. After giving a display at an airshow at Ardmore Airport in January 1989 he headed south to Masterton. While on the way he ran out of fuel after misjudging the Spitfire's fuel consumption. He managed to divert the aircraft to Waipukurau airport but during the final approach the engine failed and he crashed it damaging the undercarriage and propeller. It took nearly a year to restore the aircraft to airworthiness.

In November 1992, Wallis again crashed the Spitfire when he was caught by a wind gust when attempting to land at the RNZAF Base Woodbourne in Blenheim. As a result, the left undercarriage and left wing were damaged.

=== New Zealand Fighter Pilots Museum ===
Wallis was a driving force behind the establishment of the New Zealand Fighter Pilots Museum, which was built alongside the Alpine Deer Group offices at the Wanaka Airport. It was opened in 1993 by retired Group Captain Colin Gray. In a nearby hangar was located the Alpine Fighter Collection. Its first curator was Ian Brodie.

=== Restoration of the Polikarpovs ===
After attempting to find in Russia suitable Messerschmitt Bf 109 or Focke Wulf 190 wrecks to restore and after being swindled out of US$12,000 for three non-existent Antonov AN-2 biplanes, Wallis concentrated on obtaining the remains of crashed Polikarpov aircraft. Eventually by 1993 he had purchased sufficient remains to have six Polikarpov I-16s and three Polikarpov I-153s restored by the Soviet Aeronautical Research Institute (SibNIA) in Novosibirsk. The flight of the first restored aircraft (a I-16) took place in 1995. Once restored the aircraft were transported by rail to Vladivostok and from there shipped via Hong Kong to New Zealand. This project was completed in 1999 with the arrival of the final aircraft in New Zealand.

=== 1996 crash ===
On 2 January 1996, Wallis intended to practise formation flying with Brian Hore and his P-51 Mustang in preparation for the upcoming Warbirds over Wanaka show. He decided to take the Spitfire Mk XIV which was owned by the Alpine Fighter Collection. At the time he only had a total of 5½ hours flying time on the type and had only flown it 7 times. His departure was delayed by a problem with the aircraft's radio. Distracted by the need to meet up with Hore flying overhead and a number of people waiting to watch him take off, he overlooked the rudder setting which is different on the Griffon-engined Mk XIV from the Spitfire XVI which has a Merlin engine and which he had flown the previous day. This change in setting is necessary as the propeller of the Griffon engine rotates in the opposite direction to the Merlin. The aircraft slewed to the right on take-off and unable to be corrected in time the aircraft went off the runway and its tailwheel caught on the top two wires of the boundary fence. This stalled the aircraft and it crashed hitting the ground. The right wing was snapped off and the windscreen and cockpit area were badly damaged as the aircraft travelled upside down for about 40 metres before coming to rest. Wallis was badly hurt and was rushed by air to the intensive care unit at Dunedin Public Hospital. His injuries left him medically unfit to fly.

Following Wallis's 1996 accident, the Alpine Fighter Collection was wound down and dissolved with the aircraft being sold overseas. In addition, the NZFPM was closed in early 2011.

Since the crash, the Spitfire (NH799) was restored in time for the Classic Fighters Omaka airshow 2015 after 19 years of work.

=== Warbirds over Wanaka ===
Wallis started the biennial Warbirds over Wanaka airshow in 1988.

== Family ==
Wallis married Prue Hazledine on 22 August 1974 in Pretoria while they were on a trip to South Africa. The couple had four children; Toby Frederick (born September 1975), Jonathan Arthur (born November 1976), Matthew Timothy (3 January 1979 – 21 July 2018) and Nicholas Robert (June 1980 – 18 October 2018). In 2018, two of their four sons were killed in helicopter crashes: Matthew (Matt) Wallis (39) on 21 July and Nick (38) on 18 October.

== Death ==
Wallis died on 17 October 2023, at the age of 85.

== Honours and awards ==
- 1980 – E.A. Gibson Award for Services to New Zealand aviation.
- 1990 – Awarded the New Zealand 1990 Commemoration Medal
- 1994 – Melvin Jones Fellow Award from the Lions Club International Foundation for dedicated humanitarian services.
- 1994 – Wallis was appointed a Knight Bachelor in the 1994 New Year Honours, for services to deer farming, export and the community.
- 1999 – Sir Jack Newman Award (New Zealand Tourism Awards) for outstanding contributions to the New Zealand tourist industry.
- 2000 – Doctor of Commerce honoris causa from Lincoln University.
- 2002 – Laureate, New Zealand Business Hall of Fame for achievements in deer recovery and New Zealand tourism development and the founding of Warbirds over Wanaka.

== Bibliography ==
- Peat, Neville (2005). Hurricane Tim : The Story of Sir Tim Wallis (Hardback). Dunedin: Longarce Press. ISBN 1-877361-17-8.
