= Luggate =

Town in the South Island of New Zealand

- Rural settlement
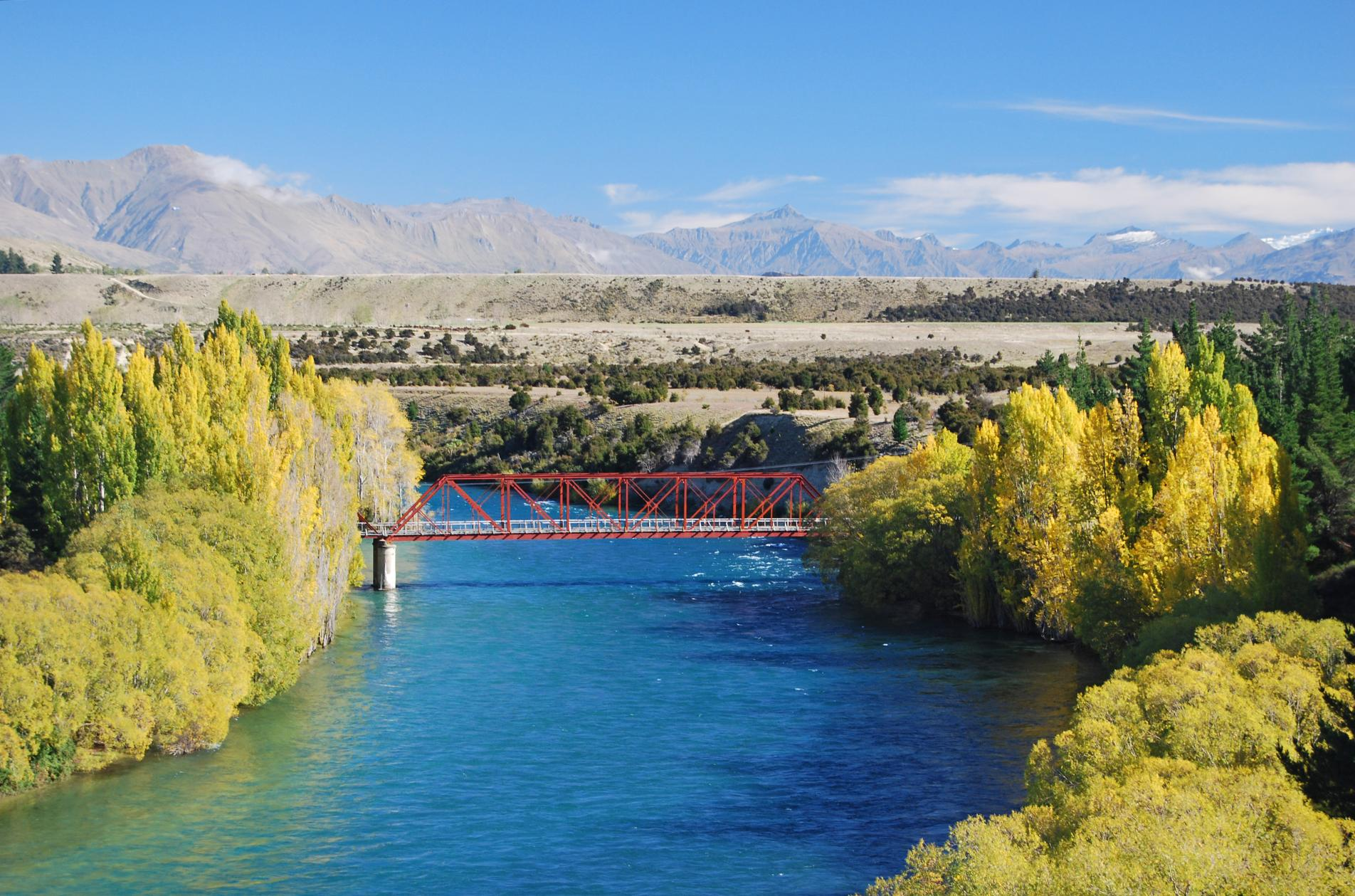
- The Red Bridge across the Clutha River at Luggate
- Interactive map of Luggate
- Coordinates: 44.7488°S 169.2696°E
- Country: New Zealand
- Region: Otago
- Territorial authority: Queenstown Lakes District
- Ward: Wānaka-Upper Clutha Ward
- Community: Wānaka-Upper Clutha Community
- Electorates: Waitaki; Te Tai Tonga (Māori)

Government
  - Territorial authority: Queenstown-Lakes District Council
  - Regional council: Otago Regional Council
  - Mayor of Queenstown-Lakes: John Glover
  - Waitaki MP: Miles Anderson
  - Te Tai Tonga MP: Tākuta Ferris

Area
  - Total: 1.19 km^{2} (0.46 sq mi)

Population (June 2025)
  - Total: 680
  - Density: 570/km^{2} (1,500/sq mi)
- Time zone: UTC+12 (NZST)
  - Summer (DST): UTC+13 (NZDT)
- Postcode: 9383
- Area code: 03
- Local iwi: Ngāi Tahu

Luggate is a small town in the South Island of New Zealand. It is located on State Highway 6 between Wānaka and Cromwell, near the junction with State Highway 8A, approximately 15 km from the Wānaka township, just past Wānaka Airport. The town is nestled below the northern end of the Criffel Range of mountains.

The Luggate 'Grandview Bridge' is a local icon listed highly in the Queenstown Lakes District Council's Historic Register. It was opened on October 28, 1915, and has been described as "one of the most attractively proportioned steel truss road bridges in the country." It is 103.7 metres long, and features a 61-metre Baltimore through truss, another 30.5m truss and a 12.2m rolled steel joist end span.

== Demographics ==
Luggate is described by Statistics New Zealand as a rural settlement. It covers 1.19 km^{2} (0.46 sq mi) and had an estimated population of 680 as of June 2025, with a population density of 571 people per km^{2}. It is part of the Upper Clutha Valley statistical area.

Historical population of Luggate
Year	Pop.	±% p.a.
2006	189	—
2013	279	+5.72%
2018	474	+11.18%

Luggate had a population of 474 at the 2018 New Zealand census, an increase of 195 people (69.9%) since the 2013 census, and an increase of 285 people (150.8%) since the 2006 census. There were 162 households, comprising 243 males and 231 females, giving a sex ratio of 1.05 males per female, with 114 people (24.1%) aged under 15 years, 60 (12.7%) aged 15 to 29, 243 (51.3%) aged 30 to 64, and 51 (10.8%) aged 65 or older.

Ethnicities were 91.8% European/Pākehā, 10.1% Māori, 0.6% Pasifika, 3.8% Asian, and 1.3% other ethnicities. People may identify with more than one ethnicity.

Although some people chose not to answer the census's question about religious affiliation, 69.0% had no religion, 20.9% were Christian, 0.6% had Māori religious beliefs, 0.6% were Hindu, 0.6% were Buddhist and 0.6% had other religions.

Of those at least 15 years old, 66 (18.3%) people had a bachelor's or higher degree, and 51 (14.2%) people had no formal qualifications. 51 people (14.2%) earned over $70,000 compared to 17.2% nationally. The employment status of those at least 15 was that 219 (60.8%) people were employed full-time, 63 (17.5%) were part-time, and 3 (0.8%) were unemployed.

=== Upper Clutha Valley ===
The Upper Clutha Valley statistical area also includes Hāwea Flat and covers 159.80 km^{2} (61.70 sq mi). It had an estimated population of 1,650 as of June 2025, with a population density of 10.3 people per km^{2}.

Historical population of Upper Clutha Valley
Year	Pop.	±% p.a.
2006	651	—
2013	879	+4.38%
2018	1,257	+7.42%

Before the 2023 census, Upper Clutha Valley had a larger boundary, covering 161.07 km^{2} (62.19 sq mi). Using that boundary, Upper Clutha Valley had a population of 1,257 at the 2018 New Zealand census, an increase of 378 people (43.0%) since the 2013 census, and an increase of 606 people (93.1%) since the 2006 census. There were 426 households, comprising 636 males and 621 females, giving a sex ratio of 1.02 males per female. The median age was 37.6 years (compared with 37.4 years nationally), with 315 people (25.1%) aged under 15 years, 156 (12.4%) aged 15 to 29, 684 (54.4%) aged 30 to 64, and 102 (8.1%) aged 65 or older.

Ethnicities were 94.5% European/Pākehā, 7.6% Māori, 2.9% Asian, and 1.7% other ethnicities. People may identify with more than one ethnicity.

The percentage of people born overseas was 22.7, compared with 27.1% nationally.

Although some people chose not to answer the census's question about religious affiliation, 69.7% had no religion, 21.7% were Christian, 0.2% had Māori religious beliefs, 0.5% were Hindu, 0.5% were Buddhist and 1.4% had other religions.

Of those at least 15 years old, 249 (26.4%) people had a bachelor's or higher degree, and 99 (10.5%) people had no formal qualifications. The median income was $37,400, compared with $31,800 nationally. 168 people (17.8%) earned over $70,000 compared to 17.2% nationally. The employment status of those at least 15 was that 558 (59.2%) people were employed full-time, 174 (18.5%) were part-time, and 6 (0.6%) were unemployed.
