= Classic Fighters =

Biennial airshow in Blenheim, New Zealand

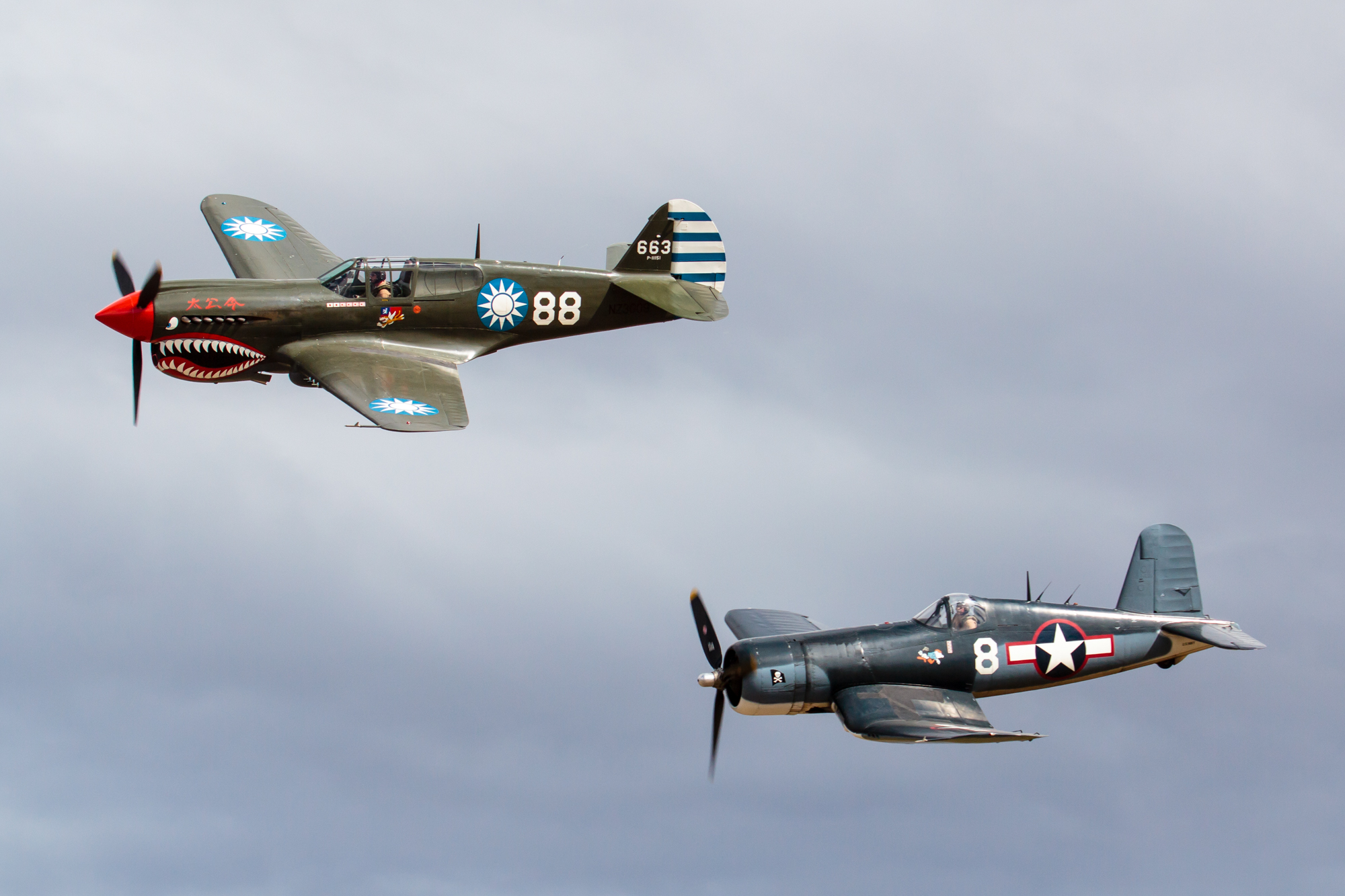
- Vought Corsair and Curtiss P-40 at Classic Fighters 2015
- Genre: Air show
- Dates: Easter weekend
- Frequency: Biennial: Odd years
- Venue: Omaka Airfield
- Location: Blenheim
- Country: New Zealand
- Established: 2001; 25 years ago
- Most recent: 2023
- Next event: 2027
- Website: http://www.classicfighters.co.nz/

Classic Fighters is a biennial airshow in Blenheim, New Zealand, held on the Easter weekend of odd-numbered years. The airshow has been running since 2001, and is held at Omaka Airfield, just outside the main town of Blenheim. Each year the air show is run with a different theme. Past themes have been a North African theme (complete with a pyramid and belly dancers) a France Theme with its Eiffel Tower, Arc de Triomphe, onion sellers and berets and also an ‘Aviation and the Movies’ theme, which opened the field wide for famous film scene recreations 2009 was for an Italian invasion. 2011 saw a focus on the second half of World War II.

Aircraft are displayed as part of a theatrical spectacle, where battle scenes and other historical events are re-enacted on the ground as well as in the air with an emphasis on World War I aircraft including as many as seven Fokker Dr.I triplanes of Jasta 11 during March 1918 well being led by the red Fokker Dr.I triplane of Manfred von Richthofen the Red Baron, as well as original Krupp artillery and World War I tanks.

A unique spectacle for the 2011 show was the launch of a life sized V-2 rocket replica.

The 2013 airshow featured the launch and destruction of a replica Bachem Natter rocket aircraft.

Aircraft on show have included:

World War I

- Airco DH.5
- Albatros D.Va
- Avro 504k
- Fokker D.VII
- Fokker Dr.I
- Halberstadt D.III
- Pfalz D.III
- Nieuport 11
- Royal Aircraft Factory B.E.2
- Sopwith Pup
- Sopwith Camel

World War II

- Avro Anson
- Messerschmitt Bf 108
- P-40 Kittyhawk
- P-51 Mustang
- F4U Corsair
- C-47 Skytrain
- Supermarine Spitfire
- Focke-Wulf Fw 190 (Replica)
- Yakovlev Yak-3

As well as many more aircraft, military vehicles and re-enactors from the Military Reenactment Society and other New Zealand reenactment groups,

The 2009 air show was held on the 10–12 April with an Italian Theme. On even-numbered years, the Warbirds over Wanaka event is held in Wānaka, also in the South Island.

Due to concerns about the COVID-19 pandemic on 10 March 2021 that year's event, originally scheduled for 2–4 April, was postponed to 3–5 September, the first time the event had been rescheduled.

In 2024, Marlborough Lines became the naming rights sponsor of the Classic Fighters Airshow for 2025, 2027 and 2029.
