= Wānaka Airport =

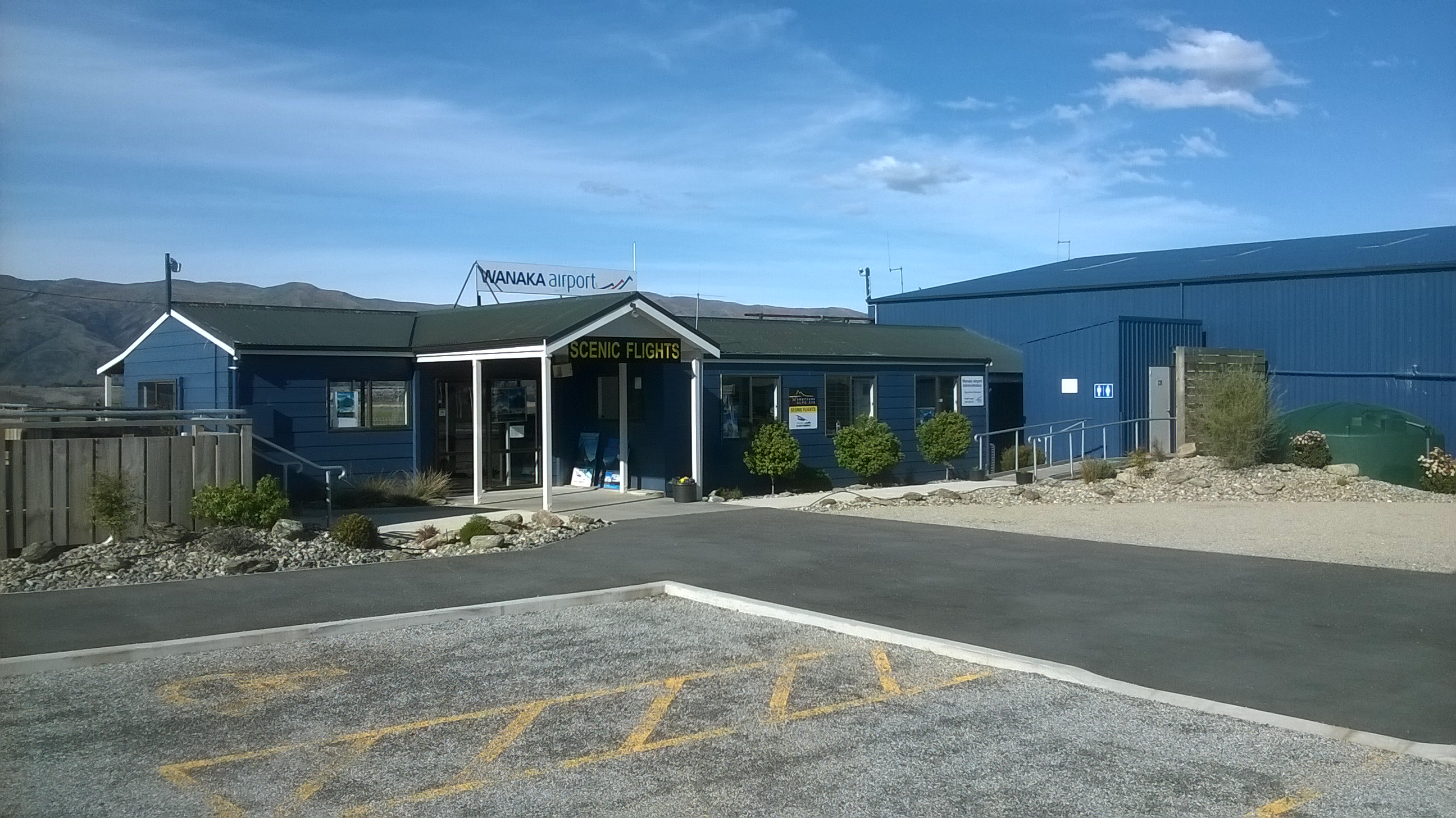
- Wānaka Airport terminal
- IATA: WKA; ICAO: NZWF

Summary
- Airport type: Public
- Operator: Wānaka Town Board and Management Committee
- Serves: Wānaka
- Location: Luggate, Otago, New Zealand
- Elevation AMSL: 1,142 ft / 348 m
- Coordinates: 44°43′21″S 169°14′45″E
- Website: wanakaairport.com

Map
- Location of airport in New Zealand

Runways
Direction	Length		Surface
Direction	ft	m	Surface
11/29	3,937	1,200	Asphalt

Wānaka Airport (IATA: WKA, ICAO: NZWF) is an airport serving the rural town of Wānaka in Otago, New Zealand. The airport has no scheduled commercial flights as of the end of September 2025, as Sounds Air, and Air New Zealand having ceased flights to the airport in 2025 and 2013. It largely serves as a base for scenic and charter flights to destinations such as Milford Sound and Mount Aspiring National Park. The airport is located beside State Highway 6, on a plateau above the small village of Luggate, and is 10 km south-east of Wānaka township. It was originally a private airstrip owned by Tim Wallis, but in 1985 it became the main commercial airport for Wānaka, replacing Mount Iron Aerodrome.

The Warbirds over Wanaka air show has been held biennially at the airport since 1988, regularly attracting crowds of more than 50,000 people. Other attractions, including the National Transport and Toy Museum and the Warbirds & Wheels Museum, are also located at the airport.

== History ==
Wānaka was originally served by Mount Iron Aerodrome. By the early 1980s it was clear a new airport would be required to serve the town's growing tourism industry as Mount Iron's runway was too short for commercial aircraft with no possibility of extension. In 1984, the local council decided to create a new airport for the town by expanding a private airstrip to the south-east of the town, which had been owned by Tim Wallis.

On 19 March 2004, Air New Zealand began scheduled services from Wānaka to Christchurch through its subsidiary Eagle Airways, using 19-seat Beechcraft 1900D aircraft. Larger aircraft, such as the Dash8-Q300, were occasionally used during periods of increased demand and airshow weekends. Air New Zealand ended scheduled services to Wānaka on 30 January 2013 after stating the route had never been profitable and showed no signs of improvement. Following the withdrawal of the national carrier, local businesses attempted to run a charter service during the ski season and asked Air New Zealand to consider reinstating services on a seasonal basis using larger aircraft, although neither of these efforts proved successful.

On 2 November 2020, a new regular commercial service operated by SoundsAir launched, once again linking Wānaka Airport with Christchurch Airport.

== Failed attempt to develop a jet airport at Wānaka ==
In September 2020, a group formed out of concerns for the future of Wānaka Airport, Wanaka Stakeholders Group Inc, took on Queenstown Lakes District Council and Queenstown Airport Corporation over an alleged illegal airport lease and plans to develop a jet airport at Wānaka Airport. The group had almost 3,500 members, 50% of Wānaka's adult population, and was claiming that QLDC and the Queenstown Airport Corporation failed to consult properly over a controversial 100-year lease that allowed virtually unlimited airport expansion in Wānaka. The group argued that QLDC and QAC documents that were kept secret for years instead forecast a new Wānaka airport as big as the Queenstown airport with jet aircraft taking off or landing every 10 – 12 minutes. The court heard evidence that elected QLDC councillors were kept in the dark over plans to introduce jet aircraft to an expanded Wānaka airport.

The court was also told that Mayor Jim Boult had been given the right by QLDC to negotiate the terms of the Wānaka airport lease, albeit alongside the QLDC CEO Mike Theelen and two selected councillors. Community consultation by QLDC deliberately hid plans to introduce narrow body jet aircraft to Wānaka as well as understating the extent of planned Wānaka airport expansion.

In April 2021, the High Court ruled that the airport lease was illegal and control of the airport was handed back to QLDC, who were cautioned to follow due process in the future. The result was a double blow against QLDC and QAC not just through the Wānaka Airport lease being declared illegal, but because the case centred on how open and transparent they had been in communicating with the Wānaka community prior to the lease being granted.

Wānaka Airport is now managed on behalf of QLDC by QAC under a management agreement.

== Operations ==
Scenic and charter operators are the main commercial users and include Air Fiordland, Aspiring Helicopters and Southern Alps Air. There are extensive skydiving and helicopter operations and a large number of general aviation aircraft are based at the airport. On 2 November 2020, Sounds Air commenced daily services between Christchurch and Wānaka utilising a PC-12. This came to an end in 2025 due to rising costs and lack of government support.

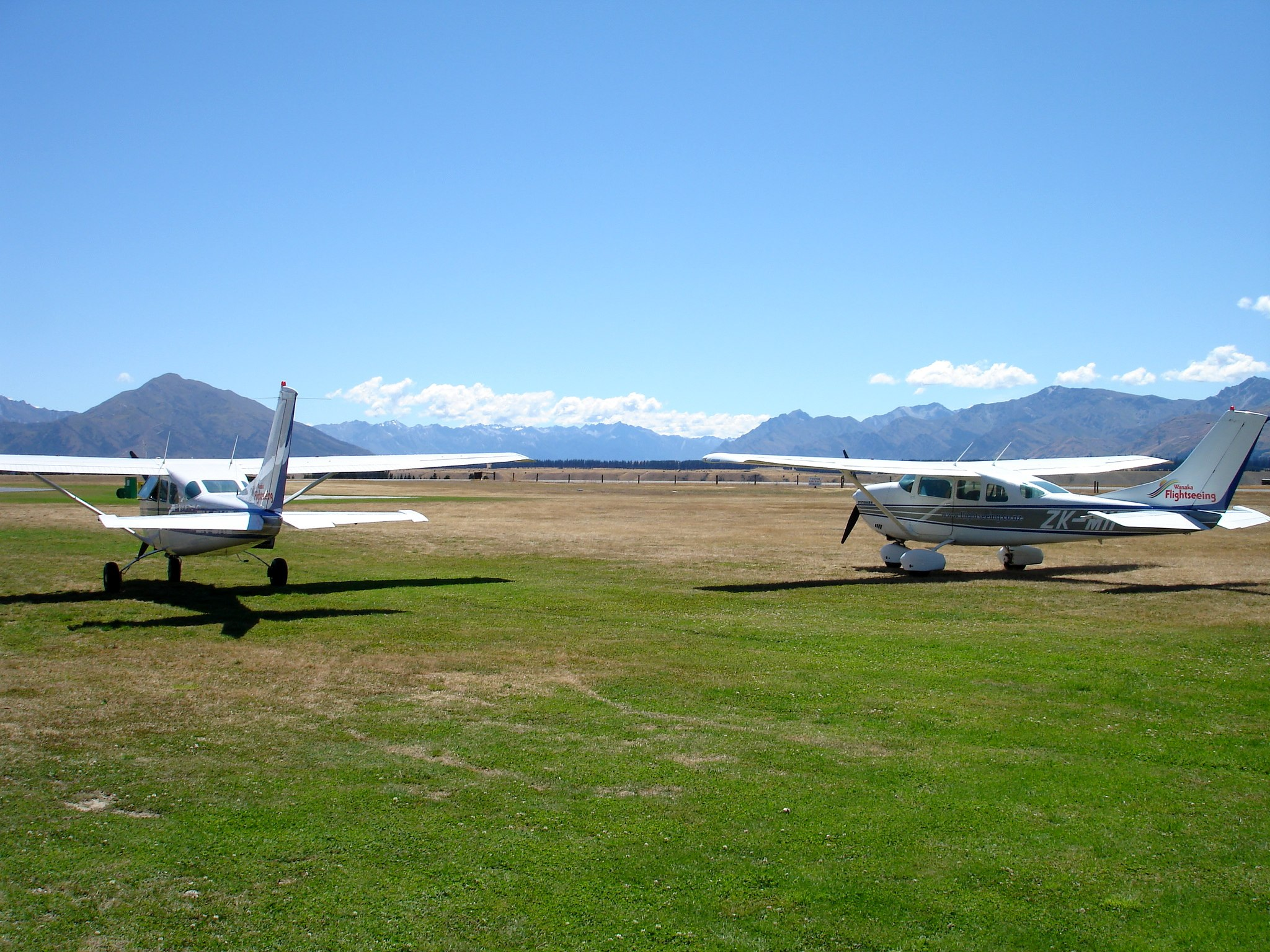
Two aircraft used for scenic flights at Wānaka Airport.

== Limitations ==
The runway's Pavement Classification Number (PCN) is too low to cope with heavier aircraft and the length of the runway prevents certain aircraft from using the airport. However, the airport has consent rights to extend the runway westward by 500 metres (1,600 ft), with an additional 240 metres (790 ft) for standard overrun requirements.

The size of the terminal limits aircraft passenger capacity; larger aircraft such as the Dash8-Q300 and ATR 72 are still able to operate but the airport's facilities are not designed to handle the larger number of the passengers these aircraft carry.

The lack of a VHF omnidirectional range (VOR) beacon at the airport poses an issue as few aircraft have appropriate GPS systems to enable a precision instrument approach in bad weather.

== See also ==
- List of airports in New Zealand
- List of airlines of New Zealand
- Transport in New Zealand
