= Tupolev Tu-14 =

Soviet torpedo bomber

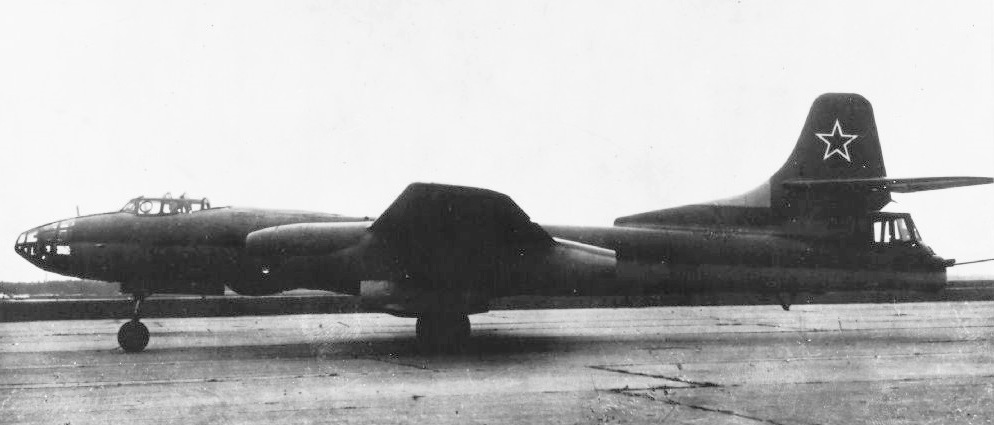
- Tu-14 light bomber

General information
- Type: Light bomber; torpedo bomber
- Manufacturer: Tupolev
- Primary user: Soviet Naval Aviation
- Number built: About 150

History
- Introduction date: 1952
- First flight: 13 October 1949
- Retired: 1959
- Developed from: Tupolev '73'

The Tupolev Tu-14 (NATO reporting name: Bosun) (USAF/DOD reporting name: Type 35), was a Soviet twinjet light bomber derived from the Tupolev '73', the failed competitor to the Ilyushin Il-28 'Beagle'. It was used as a torpedo bomber by the mine-torpedo regiments of Soviet Naval Aviation between 1952–1959 and allegedly exported to the People's Republic of China.

== Development ==
The Tu-14 had its origin in the three-engined '73' design which used a pair of Rolls-Royce Nene turbojets under the wings and a single Rolls-Royce Derwent V in the tail, in an installation much like that of the central engine of a Boeing 727. The availability of the Klimov VK-1, a more-powerful version of the Nene, allowed the RD-500, Soviet version of Derwent, to be deleted from the preliminary design, which was given the internal designation of "81". The other major change was the addition of a PSBN navigation radar which required a fifth crewmember to operate. This was rejected by the VVS and Tupolev reworked the design to eliminate the dorsal and ventral turrets and reduce the crew to only three, the pilot, a bombardier-navigator, and a tail gunner. It retained the two fixed 23 mm (0.91 in) Nudelman-Rikhter NR-23 cannon in the fuselage nose, but the design of the fuselage was changed to give the gunner his own separate pressurized compartment and a KDU-81 tail turret armed with another pair of NR-23 guns.

Construction of the prototype began in August 1949, using components from the canceled Tu-73S prototypes, and was completed in October. The manufacturer's tests were conducted between 13 October 1949 and 21 January 1950. Its State acceptance trials lasted from 23 January to 27 May 1950 and it was accepted for production, provided that the problems with the KDU-81 turret were resolved and that ejection seats were provided for the pilot and gunner, a hot air deicing was to be fitted and the gun mount in the nose revised. The first five preproduction aircraft did not incorporate these changes as they were built using Tu-73S components, after the factory in Irkutsk had prematurely begun production of that bomber. One of these was sent to Moscow where it was evaluated by Soviet Naval Aviation for use as a torpedo bomber. The sixth aircraft did incorporate all these changes as well as the navigator's ejection seat requested by Naval Aviation, and it was evaluated in May 1951. It was recommended for production as the Tu-14T and entered service in 1952 with Naval Aviation.

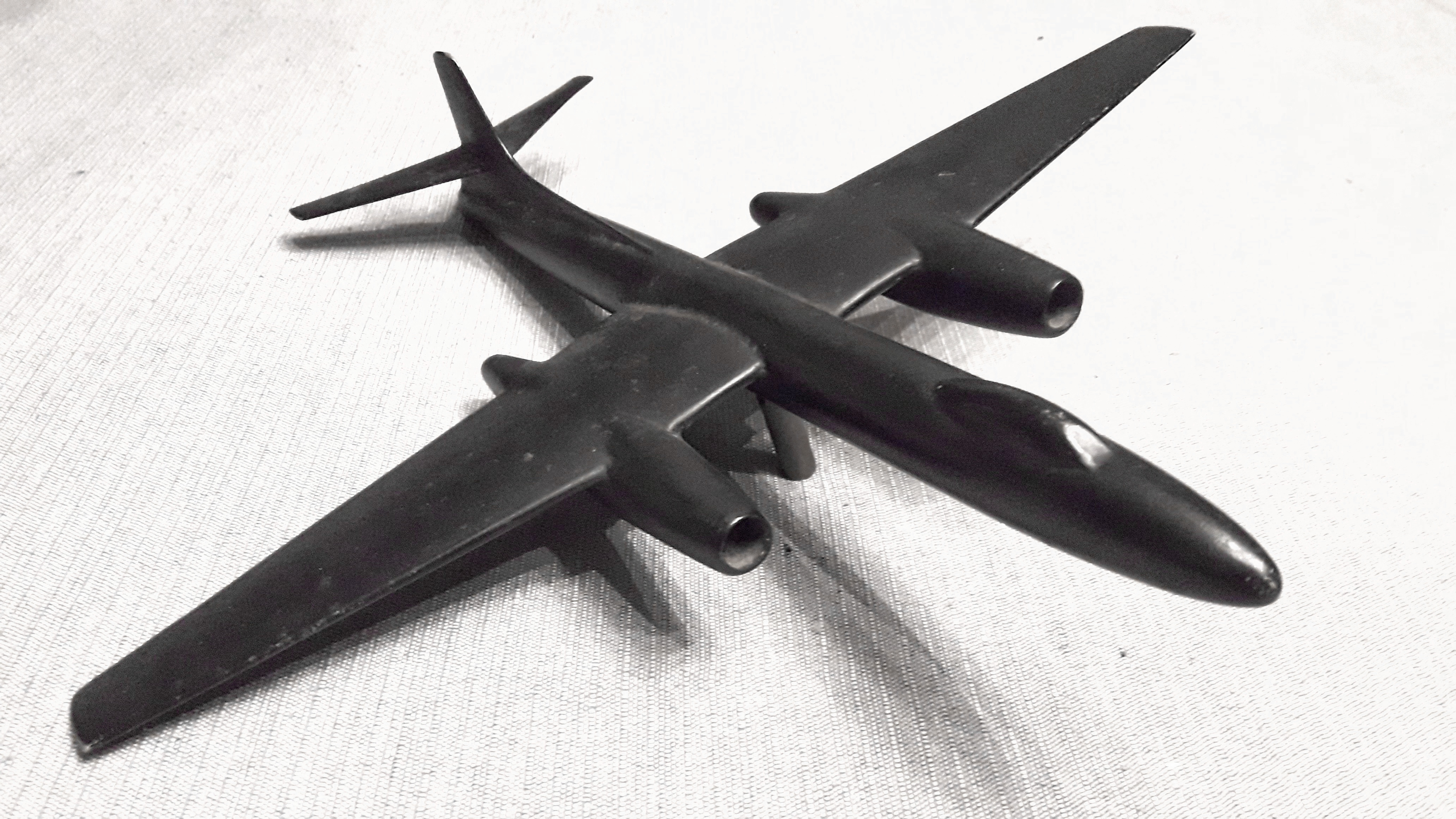
NATO identification model of the Tu-14

About 150 were produced and served with the mine-torpedo regiments of Naval Aviation until 1959. It was given the NATO reporting name Bosun. After it was withdrawn from service, several were used for various test programs, including one evaluating ramjet engines.

It was alleged by one author that up to 50 used Tu-14Ts were delivered to the Chinese People's Liberation Army Air Force although quantities and dates cannot be confirmed by said author. However, neither Russian language sources confirm this allegation nor any physical evidence (photographs, documents) exist to confirm this transfer of aircraft. It is possible that the author confused Tu-14 with Tupolev Tu-16 bombers the transfer of which to People’s Republic of China started in 1958.

The second preproduction Tu-14 was converted into a day or night photographic reconnaissance aircraft with the OKB designation of "89". The conversion was fairly minor and involved an unpressurized central cabin that housed two automatic pivoting cameras, two fuel tanks and another camera fitted in the bomb bay and another camera for oblique photography was mounted in the aircraft's tail for the daylight photography role. All cameras and their viewports were electrically heated to prevent misting and icing at altitude. For night photography, the fuel tanks and camera in the bomb bay were removed and a variety of flash bombs were carried to illuminate the targets. In addition, the screen of the PSBN-M navigation radar could be photographed by a special camera and both the pilot and navigator could record their own observations using a voice recorder. However, the VVS had already decided to use the Il-28R reconnaissance version of the standard Il-28 by the time that the "89" first flew on 23 March 1951 and Tupolev decided not to submit it for State acceptance trials.

== Variants ==
- Tu-14 – Light bomber version (not accepted for service).
- Tu-14R – Reconnaissance version (prototype only). Also known as Tu-89.
- Tu-14T – Torpedo bomber version.
- '81' - OKB designation of the Tu-14 2 × VK-1 prototype
- '93' – OKB designation of the proposed derivative of the Tu-14T with VK-5 or VK-7 engines; not built.

== Operators ==
Soviet Union

- Soviet Naval Aviation

China

- People's Liberation Army Air Force (allegedly)

== Specifications (Tu-14 / '89T') ==
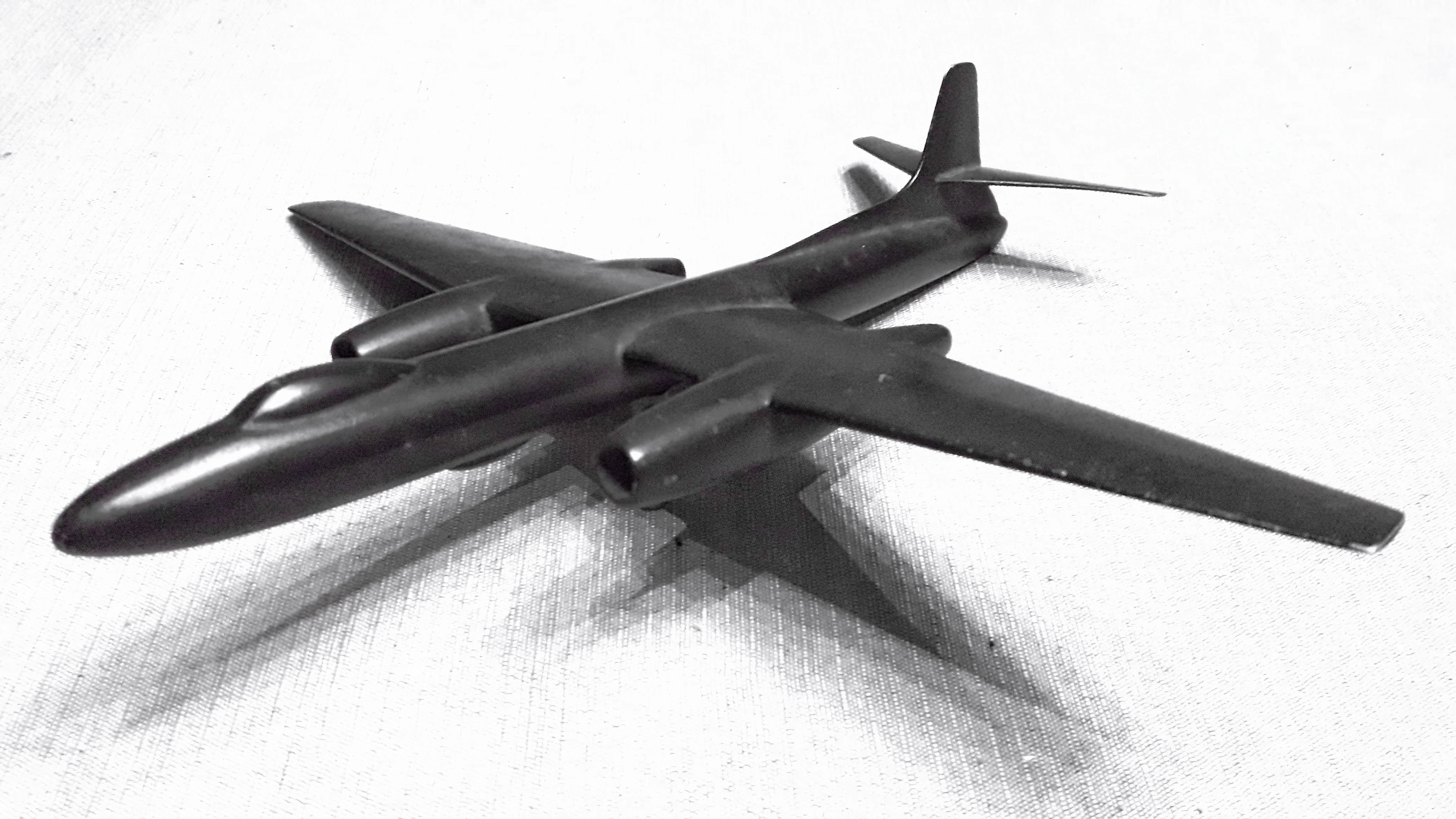
NATO identification model Tu-14

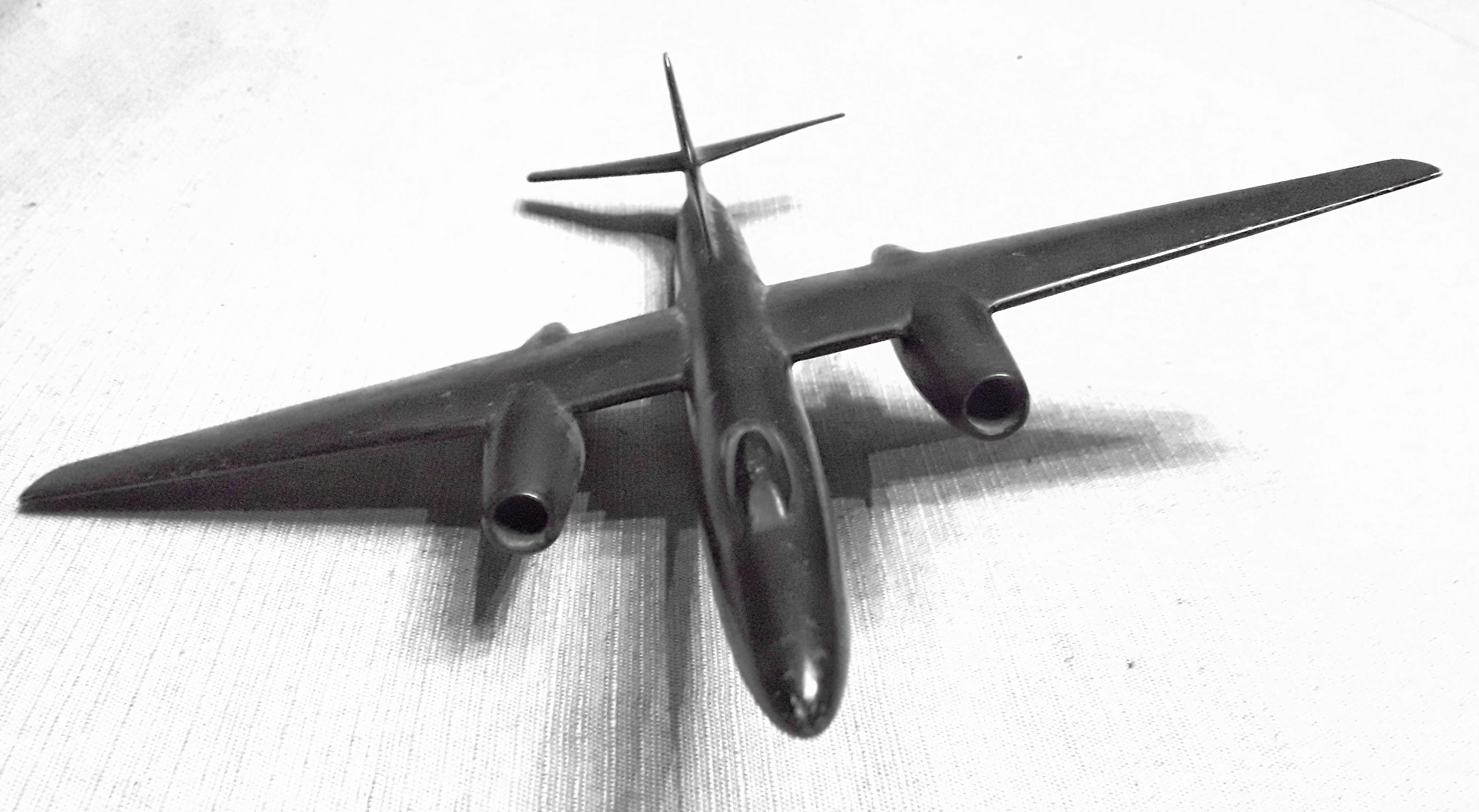
NATO identification model Tu-14

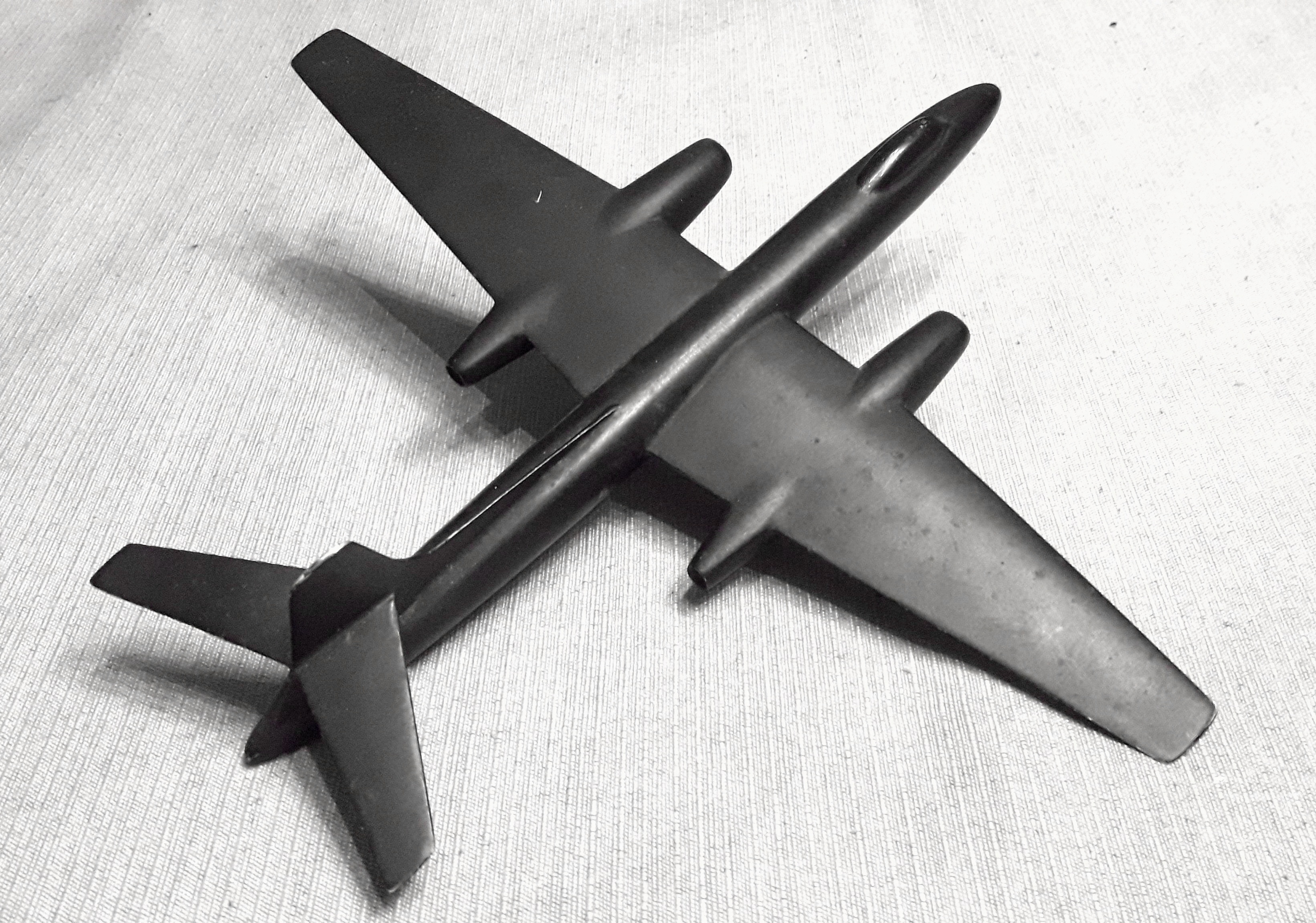
NATO identification model Tu-14

Data from Gunston, Bill (1995). Tupolev Aircraft Since 1922

General characteristics

- Length: 21.95 m (72 ft 0 in) excluding rear gun barrels
- Wingspan: 21.69 m (71 ft 2 in)
- Empty weight: 14,930 kg (32,915 lb)
- Gross weight: 21,000 kg (46,297 lb)
- Max takeoff weight: 25,350 kg (55,887 lb)
- Powerplant: 2 × Klimov VK-1 centrifugal flow turbojets, 26.48 kN (5,952 lbf) thrust each

Performance

- Maximum speed: 800 km/h (500 mph, 430 kn) at sea level; 845 km/h (525 mph; 456 kn) at 5,000 m (16,000 ft)
- Landing speed: 187 km/h (116 mph; 101 kn)
- Range: 2,870 km (1,780 mi, 1,550 nmi)
- Time to altitude: 5,000 m (16,000 ft) in 9 minutes 30 seconds
- Wing loading: 311 kg/m^{2} (64 lb/sq ft)
- Thrust/weight: 0.3
- Take-off run: 1,200 m (3,900 ft)
- Landing run: 1,100 m (3,600 ft)

Armament

- Guns:
- 2 × 23 mm (0.91 in) NR-23 cannon in the forward fuselage forward
- 2 × 23 mm (0.91 in) NR-23 cannon in tail turret
- Bombs: Up to 3,000 kg (6,600 lb) of bombs, mines or torpedoes

Avionics
PSBN-M navigation radar

== See also ==
- English Electric Canberra
- Ilyushin Il-28
- Tupolev Tu-12

== Bibliography ==
- Duffy, Paul & Kandalov, Andrei (1996). Tupolev: The Man and His Aircraft. Warrendale, Pennsylvania: SAE. ISBN 1-56091-899-3.
- Gordon, Yefim & Rigamant, Vladimir (2005). OKB Tupolev: A History of the Design Bureau and its Aircraft. Hinckley, UK: Midland Publishing. ISBN 1-85780-214-4.
- Gunston, Bill (1995). Tupolev Aircraft Since 1922. Annapolis, Maryland: Naval Institute Press. ISBN 1-55750-882-8.
