= Shpitalny Sh-37 =

- Type: Autocannon
- Place of origin: Soviet Union

Service history
- Used by: Soviet Union
- Wars: World War II

Production history
- Designer: Boris Shpitalniy
- Designed: 1940-1941
- Manufacturer: Factory no. 74
- Produced: 1941-1942
- No. built: ~240

Specifications
- Mass: 375 kilograms (827 lb)
- Length: 3,096 millimetres (121.9 in)
- Barrel length: 2,060 millimetres (81 in)
- Cartridge: 37×198 mm
- Barrels: 1
- Action: gas operated
- Rate of fire: 170-rpm (ShFK); 185 rpm (MPSh)
- Muzzle velocity: 900 m/s
- Feed system: 40 rounds (ShFK); 21 rounds magazine (MPSh)

The Shpitalny Sh-37 (Russian: Шпитальный - Ш-37) was the first indigenous Soviet 37 mm (1.5 in) aircraft cannon, designed by Boris Shpitalniy at OKB-15. The gun saw limited production and was installed in few aircraft before being replaced by the competing Nudelman-Suranov NS-37 designed at OKB-16. It was installed on a military-trial basis on two short series of aircraft. Installed to fire through the hollow, gear-driven propeller shaft and fastened to the engine block of the Yak-7-37 it was known as MPSh-37, where "MP" stands for "motornaya pushka", similar to the German Motorkanone term for the same mount type. As installed in the underwing gun pods of the Il-2 it was known as ShFK-37 (Russian: ШФК-37 - Шпитальный фюзеляжно-крыльевая калибра 37 мм), literally "Shpitalny fuselage-wing(-mounted) caliber 37mm".

== History ==
In 1940, after the Red Army accepted for service the 61-K 37 mm anti-aircraft gun, the VVS leadership decided to equip some fighters and a part of the upcoming production series of the Ilyushin Il-2 ground attack aircraft with a 37 mm autocannon capable of firing the same shell. Shpitalniy designed a gun that was gas operated and magazine fed, which however used a less powerful cartridge than the 61-K gun.

By early 1941, a prototype Sh-37 was flight tested on a LaGG-3 fighter. As installed in the LaGG-3, the gun together with its magazine weighed 208.4 kg. In this test it achieved a rate of fire of 184 rounds per minute.

At the end of June 1941, it was decided that within 45 days 40 more Sh-37 were to be produced for military trials. These were manufactured as planned by factory 74. In 1942, the same factory produced a further 196 Sh-37 guns.

The first LaGG-3 aircraft equipped with the Sh-37 gun were delivered to the 42nd IAP in the beginning of 1942. In August 1942, a small series of 22 Yak-7-37, equipped with the same gun, passed military trials with the same 42nd IAP, led by Boris Shinkarenko. The Sh-37 was powerful enough to down an enemy fighter with a single hit. Its shell could punch a hole with an area of over 1 square metre (11 sq ft). The MPSh-37 was supplied with 20 rounds of ammunition in this aircraft. The Yak-7-37 was additionally armed with two UBS 12.7 mm machine guns, with 450 rounds total ammunition. The weight of fire of the Yak-7-37 was 4.15 kg/s (9.15 lb/s). The length of the Sh-37 gun necessitated moving the cockpit some 40 cm rearwards, and the weight of the Yak-7-37 increased by some 200 kg compared to its proximate predecessor, the Yak-7B.

By mid-1941 an Il-2 exemplar was experimentally fitted with a pair of Sh-37 cannons in underwing pods. By September 15, this aircraft had passed ground and air firing test at the factory, and was presented for state trials, which were conducted between September 23 and October 12, 1941. Each Sh-37 gun on this Il-2 was provisioned with 40 rounds of ammunition. The large ammunition magazine did not fit in the wings, and mandated a conformal gun pod mount of a rather bulky design. As fitted to the wing of the Il-2, the weight of the Sh-37 with the assembly and magazine was 302.5 kg. The rate of fire measured in this latter installation was 169 rpm; muzzle velocity was 894 m/s. The underwing position of the 37mm gun pods in the Il-2 had the unpleasant effect that when the guns were fired in a dive, their recoil caused the aircraft to pitch down even further, thus reducing salvo accuracy. The flight characteristics of the Il-2 armed with the Sh-37 guns were substantially worse than for the regular versions fitted with 20 or 23 mm guns. It was slower and more difficult to handle. Its top airspeed was only 372 km/h (231 mph) at sea level and 409 km/h (254 mph) at 2,500 m (8,200 ft). Its rate of climb also deteriorated and the length of its take-off run had increased.

Nevertheless, between December 1942 and January 1943, a limited production run of nine Il-2s armed with Sh-37 guns was delivered to the 688th Attack Air Regiment (ShAP) of the 228th Attack Air Division (16th Air Army) for military trials. These aircraft took part in the combat around Stalingrad that winter. The Sh-37 gun proved somewhat effective against the German tanks of the day. It could pierce the armor of light tanks without problem and at favorable angles it was effective against German medium tanks as well. However, effective use of the gun required a high degree of skill from the pilots. Besides the diving issue, poor firing synchronization between the guns (as installed in these aircraft) caused them to also veer laterally off-course when the Sh-37 guns were fired. Consequently, bursts of only two or three rounds were practical. To compound the problems, the Sh-37 guns were also rather unreliable, with frequent jamming occurring. Even though the Sh-37s were installed in pairs, this actually decreased the overall reliability of the aircraft as a weapon. The jamming of a one gun meant that the Il-2 could no longer fire safely, due to the strong, asymmetric recoil from the still-functioning gun having a very strong destabilizing effect on the aircraft. After these experiences, the Il-2 with Sh-37 guns was not ordered in mass production.

== See also ==
- M4 cannon
- BK 37
