= Tupolev Tu-74 =

Cancelled soviet aircraft

- An artistic depiction of a Tupolev Tu-74

General information
- Type: High altitude reconnaissance aircraft and bomber
- National origin: USSR
- Manufacturer: Tupolev Design Bureau
- Status: Cancelled
- Primary user: Soviet military
- Number built: 0

History
- Manufactured: 1947
- Variants: Ilyushin Il-28; Tupolev Tu-73

The Tupolev Tu-74 was a proposed aircraft designed by the Tupolev Design Bureau in 1947.

== History and specifications ==
The Tupolev Tu-74 family of planes is often described as the link between the piston and the jet age. The plan proposed producing 72 planes, but instead lost out to a similar aircraft: the Ilyushin Il-28. According to the draft design, the aircraft would have had a wingspan of 22.36 m, an aircraft length of 16.35 meters, an aircraft height of 4.9 meters, a wing area of 60.2 square meters, a normal flight weight of 13.5 tons, a flight weight with overload of 15.1 tons, an empty aircraft mass of 10.14 tons, a maximum horizontal flight speed of 620 kilometers per hour at an altitude of 12,200 meters, climb time to 10,000 meters inn 21.4 minutes, a practical ceiling of 13,200 meters, and a flight range of 3,200 kilometers. It would have been fitted with either an M-93 engine or DB-84TK engine. The plane was armed with three NR-23 cannons, one for firing forward with an ammunition of 100 shells and two in two remote installations with an ammunition of 200 shells for the defense of the rear hemisphere. The Tupolev Tu-74 is also known as the Tu-73R as it is a variant highly similar to the Tu-73, a preceding design.
