= Vickers 40 mm Class S gun =

40 mm ground attack aircraft cannon

Vickers 40 mm Class S
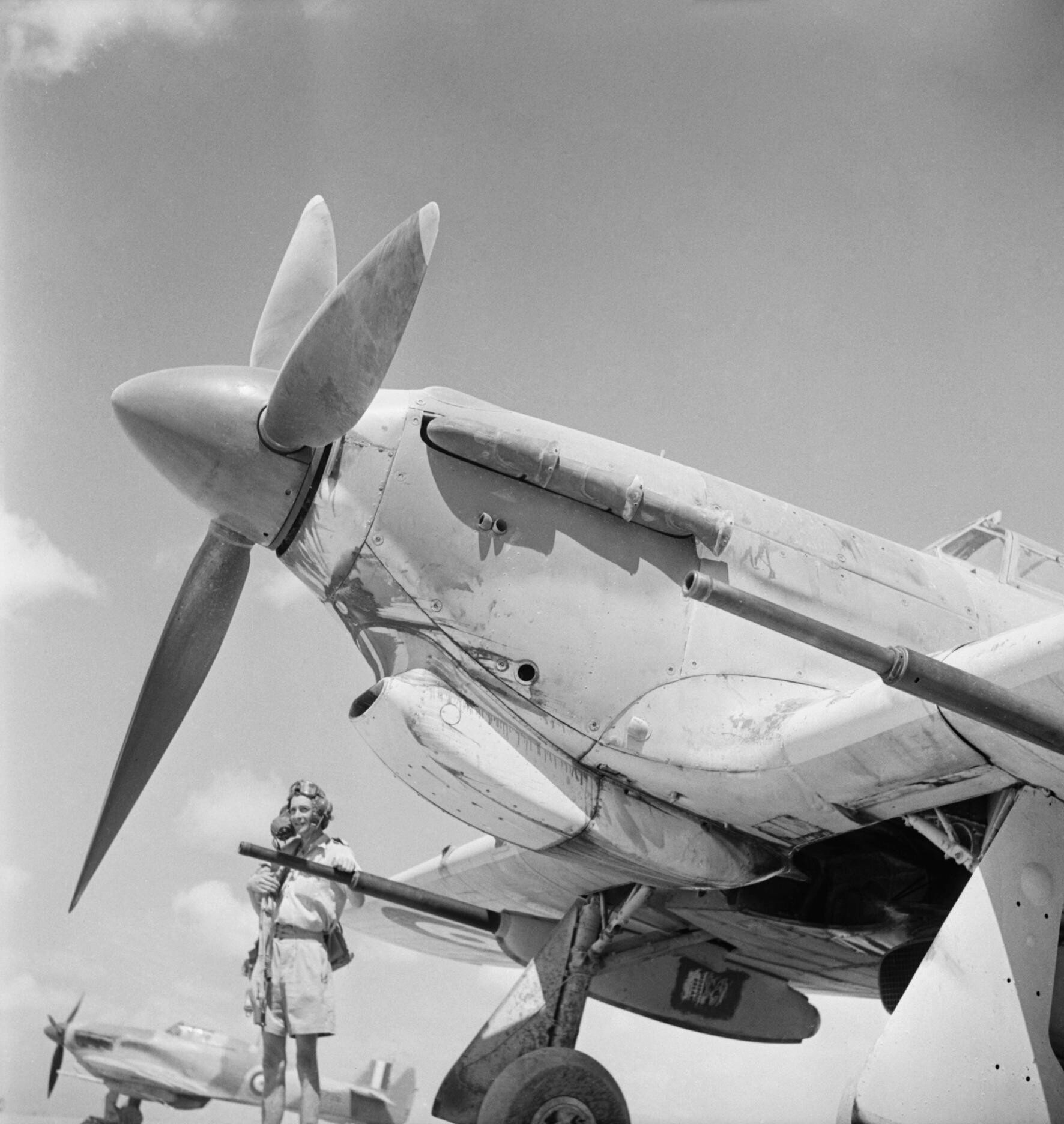
- 1942. A Hawker Hurricane fitted with two Vickers S, at Shandur, Egypt.

Service history
- In service: 1942-
- Used by: Royal Air Force
- Wars: Second World War

Production history
- Produced: 1942
- Variants: Mk 1, Mk 2

Specifications
- Mass: 320 lb (150 kg)
- Length: 9 ft 9 inches (2.97 m)
- Barrel length: 5 ft 7 in (1.7 m)
- Cartridge: 40x158R
- Cartridge weight: 4 lb (1.8 kg)
- Calibre: 40 mm (1.6 in)
- Rate of fire: 100 rounds/min
- Muzzle velocity: 1,870 ft/s (570 m/s) with 3 lb (1.4 kg) shot
- Feed system: 12-round drum later 15 rounds

The Vickers 40 mm Class S gun, (Note: The name of the gun is spelled differently throughout sources. Compare with the QF 6pdr Class M Mark I with Auto Loader Mk III.) also known simply as the Vickers S or S gun, was a 40 mm (1.57 in) airborne autocannon designed by Vickers-Armstrongs for use as aircraft armament.

It was primarily used during World War II by British aircraft to attack ground targets. It was largely replaced by the RP-3 rocket from 1943 on.

== Development ==
The Vickers 40 mm Class S gun was developed in the late 1930s as defensive weapon for bomber aircraft. The ammunition was based on the 40x158R cartridge case of the 40 mm naval QF 2-pounder anti-aircraft gun (known as the "pom-pom"). The gun itself was derived from the Coventry Ordnance Works 37 mm gun which used a long-recoil operation to fire a 1.5 lb (0.68 kg) projectile.

The gun was the planned armament of the Vickers Type 414 twin-engined fighter proposed to the Air Ministry in response to specification F6/39 for a two-seat fighter with 20mm cannon and the option of upgrading to 40mm guns. The Type 414 design placed the gun in a flexible mount in the nose, the gun linked to a range-finding predictor gunsight for the aircraft's gunner sat next to the pilot. The Air Ministry raised specification F22/39 for the design with two prototypes planned to test the gun and gunsight. The Vickers Wellington II prototype (serial L4250) was converted with the gun and gunsight in a dorsal turret. The armament was first flown on 25 October 1940 and test fired against a target (towed by a Hawker Henley target tug) on 8 November. The estimate was 50% of shells were within 4 ft of the target.

In March 1941, researchers with the Fighter Interception Unit at RAF Tangmere fitted the fourth prototype Mk I Bristol Beaufighter night fighter (Note: military serial number R2055) with the Vickers S, installed asymmetrically, in the place of one of the standard 20 mm cannon. In August, the Rolls-Royce 40 mm cannon ("R" model) was also trialled in the same Beaufighter. Both cannons were assessed when fired in the air and on the ground. In October, the Vickers S was recommended for any future service use, although it was never incorporated into production Beaufighters. The reasons for this have remained unclear, although it may have reflected the perception that a single 40 mm cannon lacked advantages over the 4x20 mm configuration.

Hawker Hurricanes, fitted with two Vickers S were trialled though not initially adopted in North Africa campaign as anti-tank armament.

The gun was considered for improving the armament of Coastal Command aircraft which were being lost to surfaced submarines from 1943. The Short Sunderland aircraft had only a few machine guns to the front which were outranged by the submarines 20 mm and 37 mm cannon. Coastal Command Boeing B-17 Fortress IIA FK185 was modified with an all-electric B.16 mounting built by Bristol installed in the nose. In tests against an old ship in June 1944, armour-piercing ammunition went through two 0.5 inch and a 0.375 plates. By this point of the war the submarine threat had been reduced and RP-3 rockets were proven to be more effective against submarines.

== Combat history ==
Early operations by the Desert Air Force in the North Africa campaign demonstrated that existing weapons were ineffective against newer German vehicles like the Panzer III medium tank. In April 1941 a group formed to study the issue, considered a series of 37 and 40 mm weapons including the "S", the Rolls-Royce cannon (belt fed variant), and the US-built M4 autocannon, all firing armour-piercing ammunition. The Rolls-Royce "BF" was initially selected, although it used drum-fed ammunition rather than the "S" belt system that was considered more reliable. About 200 BF guns were produced, but after a series of misfires and ammunition explosions, the decision was made to introduce ground attack variants of the Hawker Hurricane (designated Mark IID) with the "S". This had the added advantage that it carried 15 rounds of ammunition, compared to the "BF"'s 12.

Mark IID and Mark IV Hurricanes could mount one "S" under each wing, in conformal gun pods. The weight of the guns and ammunition, along with the dust filters and other equipment needed for desert operations, slowed the aircraft by a significant 40 mph (64 km/h). By October 1941 it was decided that the autocannon would not be suitable in the future, and the same research group turned their attention to rockets, eventually leading to the introduction of the RP-3 in 1943.

The weapon was cleared for service on the Hurricane in April 1942 and formed up with No. 6 Squadron RAF at RAF Shandur in Egypt in May. The weapon's champion, Wing Commander Stephen 'Dru' Drury, trained the pilots on using the weapon, as it had so much recoil that the aircraft slowed significantly when fired. This caused the nose to drop, and while flying at a typical altitude of 50 ft (15 m) during the approach, firing without first re-adjusting the flight path was dangerous. The pilots eventually concluded that the guns could be fired twice before the aircraft flew past the target, although on rare occasions a third shot was possible.

Claims by pilots using the Vickers S included 47 tanks destroyed (of 148 tanks hit), as well as nearly 200 other vehicles. However, the Hurricane IID was poorly protected for the ground attack role and ground fire caused heavy losses. Mark IV Hurricanes - operational from 1943 - had improved armour around their engine, cockpit and fuel tanks. In addition, 40 mm ammunition was seldom effective against vehicles as well-armoured as the Tiger I heavy tank.

From 1944, Hurricanes armed with the Vickers S served in the South East Asian theatre. In most cases HE ammunition was used against road vehicles and rivercraft.

Assessments carried out in South East Asia showed a relatively high level of accuracy: an average of 25% of shots fired at tanks hit their target. By comparison, "60 lb" RP-3 rocket projectiles only hit 5% against tank-sized targets. However, 40 mm HE rounds were twice as accurate as AP rounds, possibly because the lower weight and higher velocity of the HE round gave it ballistics similar to that of the .303 in (7.7 mm) Browning machine guns that were used for sighting.

== Comparable weapons ==
Comparable contemporary aircraft weapons:

Germany

- 30 mm MK 101
- 30 mm MK 103
- 37 mm BK 3,7
- 50 mm BK 5
- 50 mm MK 214A (experimental)

Japan

- 37 mm Ho-203
- 37 mm Ho-204
- 57 mm Ho-401

Soviet Union

- 37 mm NS-37
- 45 mm NS-45

Sweden

- 57 mm akan m/47

United Kingdom

- 40 mm Class BH gun (experimental)
- 47 mm Class P gun (experimental)
- 57 mm QF 6-pounder Class M gun
