= Tupolev Tu-2 =

1943 medium bomber aircraft family

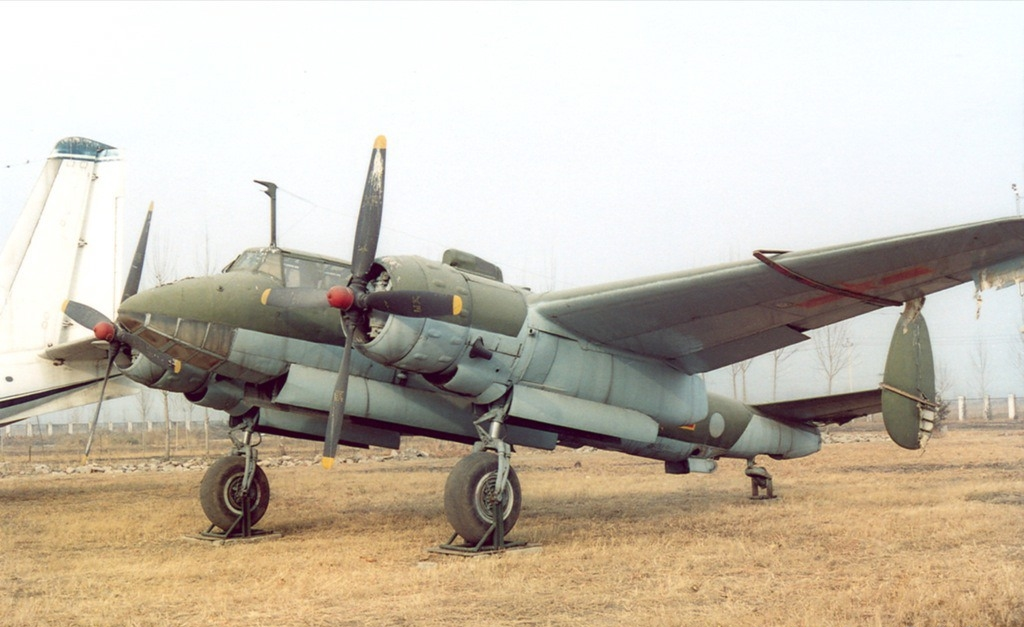
- A Chinese Tu-2 bomber at the China Aviation Museum, Beijing

General information
- Type: Medium bomber
- Manufacturer: Tupolev
- Designer: Andrei Tupolev
- Primary users: VVS Soviet Naval Aviation; People's Liberation Army Air Force; Polish Air Forces
- Number built: 2,257

History
- Manufactured: 1941–1948
- Introduction date: 1942
- First flight: 29 January 1941
- Retired: 1950 (Soviet Air Forces), 1982 (PLAAF)
- Variants: Tupolev Tu-1; Tupolev Tu-8; Tupolev Tu-12

The Tupolev Tu-2 (development names ANT-58 and 103; NATO reporting name Bat) is a twin-engined Soviet high-speed daylight and frontline bomber aircraft used during World War II. The Tu-2 was tailored to meet a requirement for a high-speed bomber or dive-bomber, with a large internal bomb load and speed similar to that of a single-seat fighter. Designed to challenge the German Junkers Ju 88, the Tu-2 proved comparable and was produced in torpedo, interceptor and reconnaissance versions. The Tu-2 was an effective combat aircraft and it played a key role in the final offensives of the Red Army.

== Design and development ==
In 1937, Andrei Tupolev, along with many Soviet designers at the time, was arrested on trumped-up charges of activities against the State. Despite the actions of the Soviet government, he was considered important to the war effort and following his imprisonment, he was placed in charge of a team that was to design military aircraft. Designed as Samolyot (Russian: "aircraft") 103, the Tu-2 was based on earlier ANT-58, ANT-59 and ANT-60 light bomber prototypes. A bigger and more powerful ANT-60 powered by AM-37 engines, the first prototype was completed at Factory N156, and made its first test flight on 29 January 1941, piloted by Mikhail Nukhtinov.

Mass production began in September 1941, at Omsk Aircraft Factory Number 166, with the first aircraft reaching combat units in March 1942. Modifications were made based on combat experience, and Plant Number 166 built a total of 80 aircraft. The AM-37 engine was abandoned to concentrate efforts on the AM-38F for the Il-2, which required Tupolev to redesign the aircraft for an available engine. Modifications of this bomber to the ASh-82 engine as well as improving the general design for simpler manufacturing took well into 1943 with production restarting in late 1943. Wartime production of the new variant was about 800 aircraft (up to June 1945) with an overall production of 2460 aircraft until 1952, the majority of them built by aircraft factory number 23 in Moscow.

== Operational history ==
Built from 1941 to 1948, the Tu-2 was the USSR's second most important twin-engine bomber after the Petlyakov Pe-2. The design brought Andrei Tupolev back into favour after a period of detention. Crews were universally happy with their Tupolevs. The aircraft was fast and maneuverable like a fighter and it could survive heavy damage. The first Soviet unit to be equipped with the Tu-2 was the 132nd Bomber Aviation Regiment of the 3rd Air Army. The aircraft had its baptism of fire over Velikiye Luki, where the bomber flew 46 sorties from November to December 1942. On 11 February 1943, 132 BAP was transferred to 17 VA to support the drive toward the River Dnepr and it flew another 47 sorties - attacking airfields and rail junctions - until April 13, when the unit was removed from the frontline. In that time, only three Tu-2s were lost in action, while seven were damaged. The Tu-2 remained in service in the USSR until 1950.

Some surplus Tu-2s were provided to the Chinese People's Liberation Army Air Force for use in the Chinese Civil War. Some Chinese Tu-2s were shot down by United Nations airmen during the Korean War. In the 1958–1962 'counter-riot actions' during the 1959 Tibetan uprising in Qinghai-Tibet Plateau covering Qinghai, Tibet, southern Gansu, and western Sichuan, Chinese PLAAF Tu-2s took on the roles of ground-attack, reconnaissance and liaison. The Chinese Tu-2s were retired at the end of the 1970s. After World War II, the Tu-2 was used as a testbed aircraft for various engines, including the first generation of Soviet jet engines.

== Variants ==
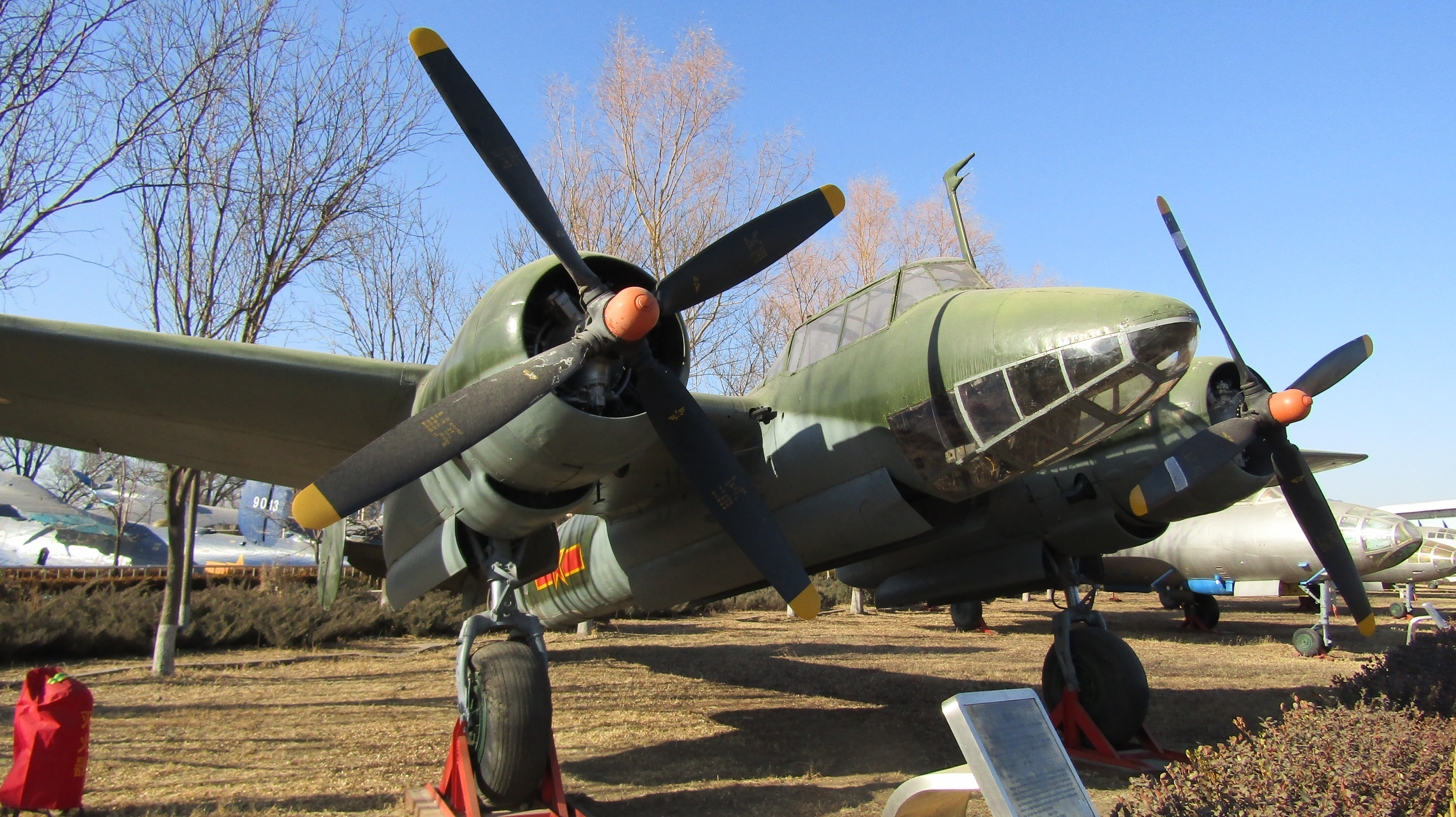
Tupolev Tu-2S at China Aviation Museum, Beijing

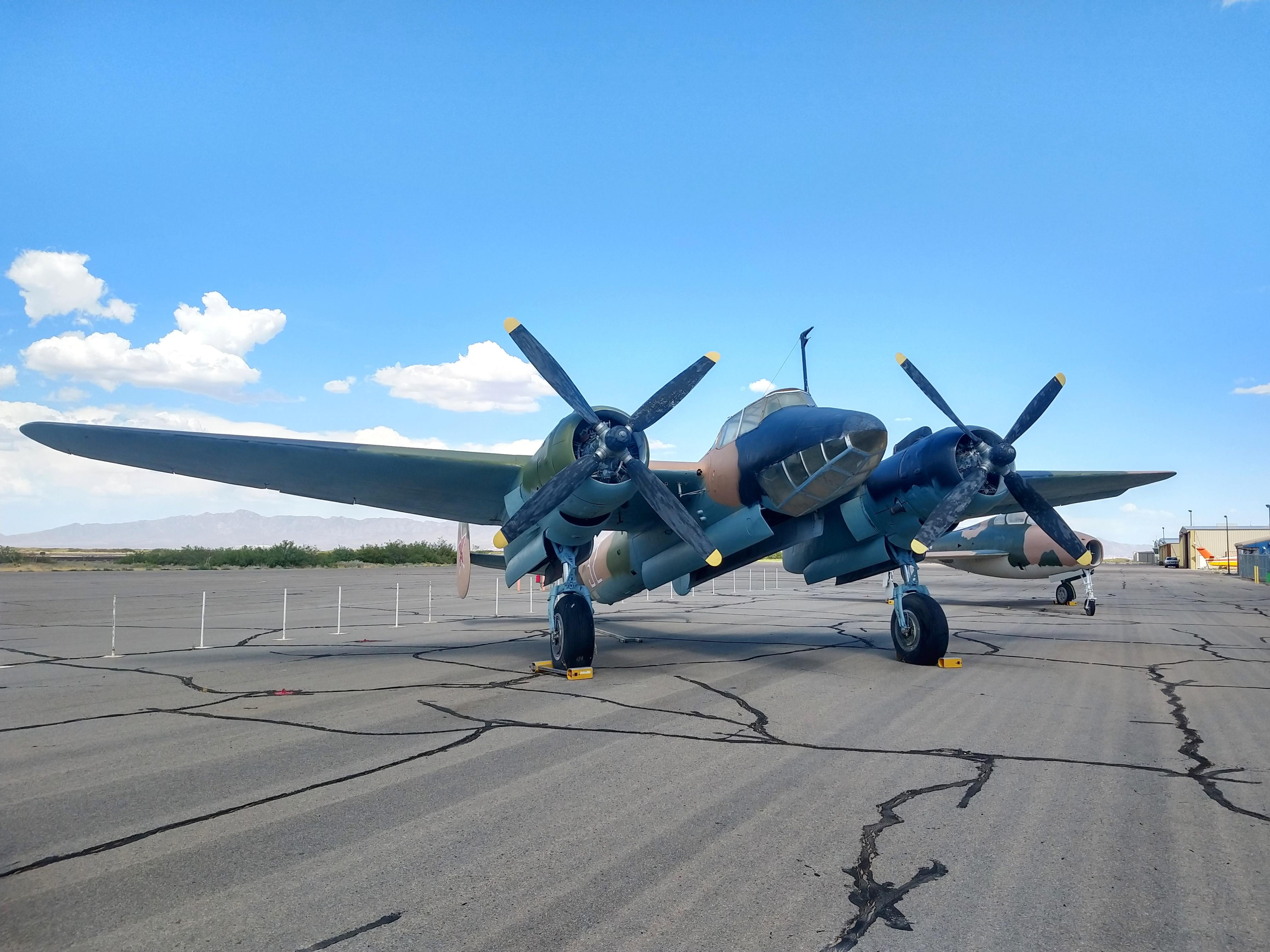
Tupolev Tu-2 at the War Eagles Air Museum, NM, USA

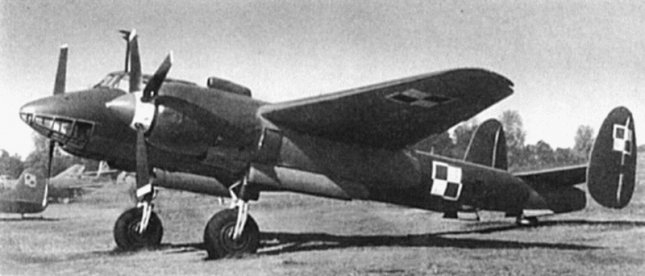
Tupolev Tu-2 of Polish Air Forces

"Aircraft 103" (ANT-58)
The initial three-seat version. Top speed 635 km/h (395 mph) at 8,000 m (26,000 ft). Two 1,044 kW (1,400 hp) Mikulin AM-37 (water cooled V-12), 1941.
"Aircraft 103U" (ANT-59)
Redesigned for four-seat crew (influenced by Junkers Ju 88). Top speed dropped to 610 km/h (380 mph). It used the same engines as the ANT-58.
"Aircraft 103S" (ANT-61)
Final pre-production version of the Tu-2, based on the 103V.
"Aircraft 103V" (ANT-60)
As ANT-59 but powered by air-cooled Shvetsov ASh-82 engines after the AM-37 was cancelled.
"Aircraft 104"
Tu-2S modified for interceptor role.
ANT-64
Long-range four-engine heavy bomber project developed from the Tu-2, cancelled in favor of the Tu-4.
ANT-66
52-seat airliner variant of ANT-64.
Tu-1 (ANT-63R)
Prototype three-seat night fighter version.
Tu-2
Two 1,081 kW (1,450 hp) Shvetsov ASh-82 (air cooling) with bigger drag, 1942.
Tu-2ACh-39VF (ANT-67)
A diesel-engined version powered by two Charomskiy ACh-39VF engines, 1946. Despite producing 1900 hp, speed dropped to 509 km/h (316 mph), but range increased to 4,100 km (2,500 mi). It was also much heavier than most Tu-2s. The ANT-67 was cancelled due to engine problems.
Tu-2D (ANT-62)
Long-range version powered by two 1900 hp Shvetsov ASh-83 engines, it appeared in October 1944. It had an increased span and a crew of five aviators. Powered by two 1,380 kW (1,850 hp) Shvetsov ASh-82FN, 1943
Tu-2DB (ANT-65)
High-altitude reconnaissance bomber version developed from the Tu-2D, powered by two turbo-supercharged Mikulin AM-44TK engines.
Tu-2G
High-speed cargo transport version.
Tu-2K
Only two aircraft were built for testing ejection seats.
Tu-2LL
Tu-2's modified as testbeds.
Tu-2M (ANT-61M)
Powered by two 1,417 kW (1,900 hp) ASh-83 radial piston engines.
Tu-2N
Engine testbed, built to test the Rolls-Royce Nene turbojet engine.
Tu-2 Paravan
Two aircraft built to test barrage balloon cable cutters and deflectors.
Tu-2P/Tu-2R/Tu-6 (ANT-63)
Photo-reconnaissance version of the Tu-2, powered by two ASh-82FN engines. The wingspan was increased by 10.9 feet to 72.9 feet, allowing extra fuel tanks to be fitted, increasing range. Cameras were fitted in the bomb bays and could be daylight or infrared cameras for use at night. Built in small numbers and were in service until the mid-1950s.
Tu-2RShR
Prototype, armed with 57 mm (2.24 in) cannon in the forward fuselage.
Tu-2S
Powered by two 1,380 kW (1,850 hp) Shvetsov ASh-82FN radial piston engines, 1943.
TU-2SDB (ANT-63)
High-speed day bomber prototype.
Tu-2S RLS PNB-4
Secretive night-fighter prototype developed under leadership of the NKVD special section of V. Morgunov and P. Kuksenko. Equipped with the Soviet Gneiss 5 (Гнейс 5) radar. Armed with two NS-45 autocannons. Development presumed to have started in 1943. Precursor of the Tu-1.
Tu-2Sh
Experimental ground-attack version. Two variants were tested in 1944: one with a 76 mm (2.99 in) centerline gun and another with a battery of 88 7.62 mm (0.300 in) PPSh-41 submachine guns fixed in the bomb bay, directed to fire ahead at a 30-degree angle. Another version under this designation was tested in 1946; this one had a frontal armament consisting of two NS-37 and two NS-45 autocannons.
Tu-2T (ANT-62T)
Torpedo-bomber variant based on the Tu-2S, was tested between February and March 1945, and issued to Soviet Naval Aviation units.
Tu-2U
Trainer version.
Tu-8 (ANT-69)
Long-range bomber similar to the Tu-2D, but with a larger wing area. Four-blade propellers were fitted, and it was armed with two wing-mounted 23 mm NS-23 cannons and rear-facing 20 mm cannons replacing the previous machine guns. One built at the end of 1946.
Tu-10 (ANT-68)
It was a high-altitude variant that saw limited service, 1943.
Tu-12
Medium-range jet bomber prototype; first Soviet jet bomber, 1947. Also known as Tu-77.
UTB
Bomber trainer with Shvetsov ASh-21 engines of 515 kW (691 hp) created by the Sukhoi OKB in 1946

== Operators ==
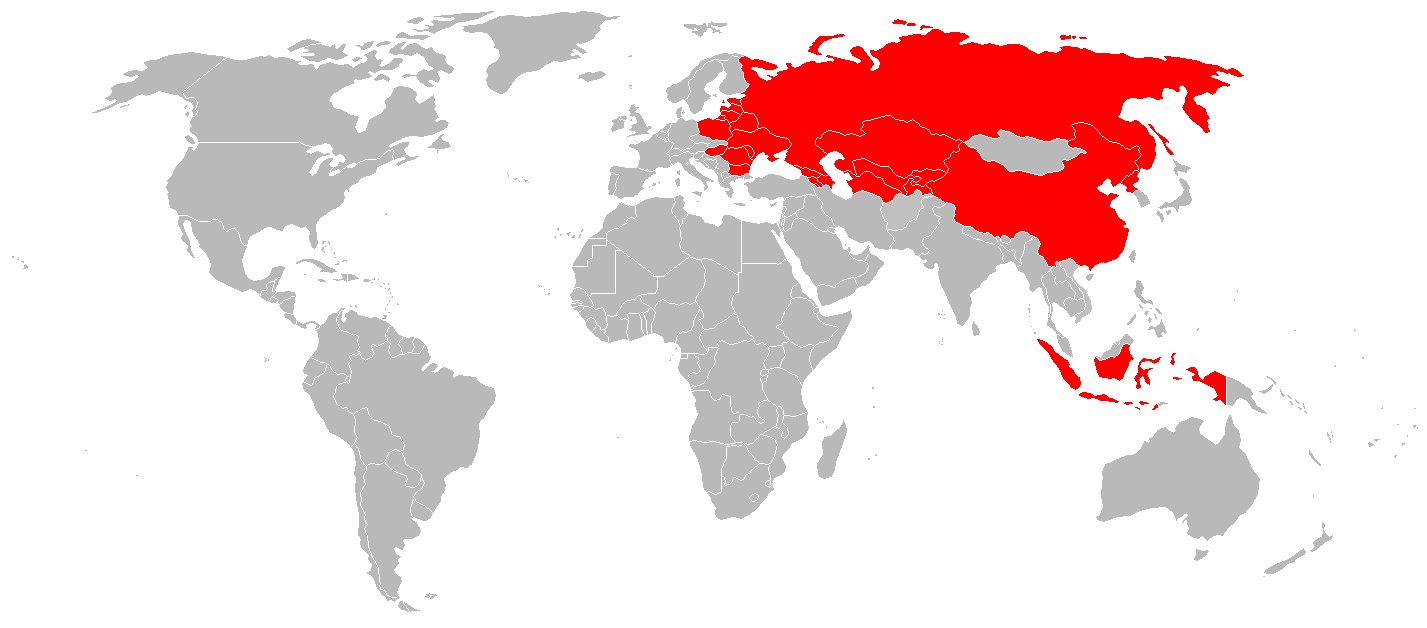
Tu-2 operators

Bulgaria

- Bulgarian Air Force

China

- People's Liberation Army Air Force – Imported 33 UTB-2 and 29 T-2U trainers at the end of 1949. The last four UTB-2s retired in 1965. Imported 311 Tu-2s from the end of 1949 to 1952. The last 30 Tu-2s retired in 1982.

Hungary

- Hungarian Air Force

Indonesia

- Indonesian Air Force – 12 ex-Chinese Tu-2S delivered in 1959.

North Korea

- North Korean Air Force

Poland

- Polish Air Force – Eight aircraft in 1949-early 1960s.
- Polish Navy

Romania

- Romanian Air Force – Six delivered in 1950: two Tu-2s, two Tu-2 trainers and two Tu-6s.

Soviet Union

- Soviet Air Forces

== Aircraft on display ==
Bulgaria

- On static display at the Bulgarian Museum of Aviation in Plovdiv. It is a Tu-2T, tactical number 27.

China

- On static display at the Beijing Air and Space Museum in Beijing.
- On static display at the Military Museum of the Chinese People's Revolution in Beijing.
- On static display at the Chinese Aviation Museum in Beijing.
- On static display at the Chinese Aviation Museum in Beijing.

Poland

- Tu-2S on static display at the Polish Aviation Museum in Kraków, Lesser Poland. It was used for testing ejection seats.
- Tu-2S on static display at the Museum of the Polish Army in Warsaw, Mazovia. It was used by the 7th Independent Dive Bomber Regiment ("7 samodzielny pułk lotniczy bombowców nurkujących").

Russia

- On static display at the Central Air Force Museum in Monino, Moscow.
- Under restoration to airworthy condition for the Wings of Victory Foundation in Moscow.

United States

- On static display at the War Eagles Air Museum in Santa Teresa, New Mexico.
- In storage at the Fantasy of Flight in Polk City, Florida.

== Specifications (Tu-2S) ==
Tupolev Tu-2 3-view drawing

Data from Gordon & Rigmant

General characteristics

- Crew: 4
- Length: 13.8 m (45 ft 3 in)
- Wingspan: 18.86 m (61 ft 11 in)
- Height: 4.13 m (13 ft 7 in)
- Empty weight: 7,601 kg (16,757 lb)
- Gross weight: 10,538 kg (23,232 lb)
- Max takeoff weight: 11,768 kg (25,944 lb)
- Powerplant: 2 × Shvetsov ASh-82 14-cylinder air-cooled radial piston engines, 1,380 kW (1,850 hp) each
- Propellers: 3-bladed АБ-5-167А, 3.8 m (12 ft 6 in) diameter , Weight: 178 kg, Pitch range: 23-53°

Performance

- Maximum speed: 528 km/h (328 mph, 285 kn)
- Range: 2,020 km (1,260 mi, 1,090 nmi)
- Service ceiling: 9,000 m (30,000 ft)
- Rate of climb: 8.2 m/s (1,610 ft/min)
- Wing loading: 220 kg/m^{2} (45 lb/sq ft)
- Power/mass: 0.260 kW/kg (0.158 hp/lb)

Armament

- Guns:
  - 2 × 20 mm (0.79 in) ShVAK cannons fixed forward-firing in the wings
  - 3 × 7.62 mm (0.30 in) rear-firing ShKAS machine guns (later replaced by 12.7 mm (0.50 in) Berezin UB machine guns) in the canopy, dorsal and ventral hatches. Some modified to have the Berezin B-20 cannon
- Bombs: 1,500 kg (3,300 lb) internally and 2,270 kg (5,000 lb) externally

== See also ==
Related development

- Tupolev Tu-1
- Tupolev Tu-8
- Tupolev Tu-12

Aircraft of comparable role, configuration, and era

- de Havilland Mosquito
- Dornier Do 217
- Junkers Ju 88
- Messerschmitt Bf 110
- Petlyakov Pe-2

Related lists

- List of aircraft of World War II

== Bibliography ==
- Bergström, Christer. Black Cross – Red Star, Air War over the Eastern Front. Volume 4. Stalingrad to Kuban. Vaktel Books, 2019. ISBN 978-91-88441-21-8
- Bishop, Chris. The Encyclopedia of Weapons of WWII: The Comprehensive Guide to Over 1,500 Weapons Systems, Including Tanks, Small Arms, Warplanes, Artillery, Ships, and Submarines. Sterling, 2002. ISBN 1-58663-762-2.
- Collins, Jeremy (Spring 1994). "'Bat' Perspectives". Air Enthusiast. No. 53. pp. 22–23. ISSN 0143-5450.
- Ethell, Jeffrey L. Aircraft of World War II. HarperCollins/Jane's, 1995. ISBN 0-00-470849-0.
- Jackson, Robert. Aircraft of World War II: Development, Weaponry, Specifications Amber Books, 2003. ISBN 1-85605-751-8.
- Leonard, Herbert. Encyclopaedia of Soviet Fighters 1939–1951. Histoire & Collections, 2005. ISBN 2-915239-60-6.
- Munson, Kenneth. Aircraft of World War II. Doubleday and Company, 1972. ISBN 0-385-07122-1.
