= Tupolev Tu-72 =

Tu-72

General information
- Type: Medium bomber
- National origin: Soviet Union
- Manufacturer: Tupolev
- Number built: None

History
- Developed from: Tupolev Tu-8

The Tupolev Tu-72 was a proposed Soviet medium bomber of the late 1940s. It was based on the Tupolev Tu-8, but differed by having a slightly longer fuselage, increased defensive armament, and slightly enlarged vertical stabilizers. The first flight of the Tu-72 was scheduled for 1948, but the project was cancelled due to the success of the Tupolev Tu-4 and Tupolev's focus on first-generation strategic jet bombers.
