= Tupolev Tu-1 =

Type of aircraft

Tu-1
- Front-quarter view of the Tu-1 (ANT-63P) prototype

General information
- Type: Night fighter
- National origin: Soviet Union
- Manufacturer: Tupolev
- Status: Cancelled
- Number built: 1

History
- First flight: 22 March 1947
- Developed from: Tupolev Tu-2

The Tupolev Tu-1 was a prototype Soviet night fighter variant of the Tupolev Tu-2 medium bomber that first flew after the end of World War II. It was cancelled when its experimental Mikulin AM-43V engines reached the end of their service life.

== Development ==
Impressed by the performance of the de Havilland Mosquito the Soviets asked Tupolev to modify a Tu-2 as a high-speed day bomber with a reduced crew as the ANT-63. The second prototype of this project was ordered to be converted in February 1946 for use as a three-seat long-range interceptor capable of carrying an airborne radar set with the internal designation of ANT-63P and the official designation of Tu-1. It was given prototype Mikulin AM-43V engines driving four-bladed propellers, and fitted with new radio equipment. It reverted to the standard Tu-2S undercarriage. Two 45 mm (1.8 in) Nudelman-Suranov NS-45 guns with 50 rounds each were fitted on the underside of the nose, two 23 mm (0.91 in) Volkov-Yartsev VYa-23 or Nudelman-Suranov NS-23 cannon were fitted in the wing roots with 130 rounds per gun. The dorsal gunner was given a 12.7 mm (0.50 in) UBT machine gun with 200 rounds and the ventral gunner received a UBT with 350 rounds of ammunition. It retained the internal bomb bay which could carry up to 1,000 kg (2,200 lb) of bombs.

The Tu-1 first flew on 22 March 1947 and underwent manufacturer's tests until 3 October or 3 November 1947. Sources disagree about the mounting of radar during these tests. Bill Gunston says that a Soviet derivative of the German FuG 220 Lichtenstein SN-2 was tested, however Yefim Gordon believes that no radar was fitted at all and the short service life of the AM-43V prototype engines curtailed the planned tests and development. At any rate, the aircraft was not selected for production because its AM-43V engines were not ready for production.

== Specifications ==
Data from OKB Tupolev: A History of the Design Bureau and its Aircraft

General characteristics

- Crew: 3
- Length: 13.6 m (44 ft 7 in)
- Wingspan: 18.86 m (61 ft 11 in)
- Height: 3.32 m (10 ft 11 in)
- Wing area: 48.8 m^{2} (525 sq ft)
- Airfoil: root: TsAGI-40 (13.75%); tip: TsAGI-40 (9.9%)
- Empty weight: 9,460 kg (20,856 lb)
- Gross weight: 12,755 kg (28,120 lb)
- Max takeoff weight: 14,460 kg (31,879 lb)
- Powerplant: 2 × Mikulin AM-43V V-12 liquid-cooled piston engines, 1,454 kW (1,950 hp) each
- Propellers: 4-bladed constant-speed propellers

Performance

- Maximum speed: 641 km/h (398 mph, 346 kn)
- Range: 2,250 km (1,400 mi, 1,210 nmi)
- Service ceiling: 11,000 m (36,000 ft)
- Wing loading: 261.37 kg/m^{2} (53.53 lb/sq ft)

Armament

- Guns:

- 2 × 45 mm Nudelman-Suranov NS-45, cannon chin-mounted (50 rpg)
- 2 × 23 mm Nudelman-Suranov NS-23, wing-mounted (130 rpg)
- 2 × 12.7 mm UBT machine guns, dorsal and ventral (250/350 rpg)

- Bombs: up to 1,000 kg (2,200 lb) of bombs

== See also ==
Aircraft of comparable role, configuration, and era

- Dornier Do 17
- Dornier Do 217
- Douglas A-20 Havoc
- Focke-Wulf Ta 154
- Junkers Ju 88
- Petlyakov Pe-3

== Bibliography ==
- Gordon, Yefim & Rigamant, Vladimir (2005). OKB Tupolev: A History of the Design Bureau and its Aircraft. Midland Publishing. ISBN 1-85780-214-4.
- Gunston, Bill (1995). Tupolev Aircraft since 1922. Naval Institute Press. ISBN 1-55750-882-8.
