= M4 autocannon =

US WWII-era autocannon

37 mm Automatic Gun, M4
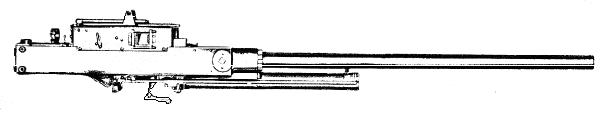
- Type: Autocannon
- Place of origin: United States

Service history
- In service: 1942–1945
- Used by: United States; Soviet Union
- Wars: World War II

Production history
- Designer: John Browning
- Designed: 1921–1938
- Manufacturer: Colt
- Produced: 1939
- Variants: M9, M10

Specifications
- Mass: 213 lb (97 kg)
- Length: 89.5 in (2.27 m)
- Shell: 37×145mmR
- Caliber: 37 mm (1.46 in)
- Action: recoil operation
- Recoil: 9 5/8 in (245 mm)
- Rate of fire: 150 rpm
- Muzzle velocity: 2,000 ft/s (610 m/s)
- Feed system: 30-round magazine

The 37 mm Automatic Gun, M4, known as the T9 during development, was a 37 mm (1.46 in) recoil-operated autocannon designed by Browning Arms Company and entered service in 1942. The M4 and its variants would primarily be manufactured by Colt's Manufacturing Company and Oldsmobile (under contract by Colt) and is therefore sometimes referred to as the "Colt M4" or "Oldsmobile M4." It was primarily mounted in the Bell P-39 Airacobra and P-63 Kingcobra, with the US Navy also using it on many PT boats.

== Design ==
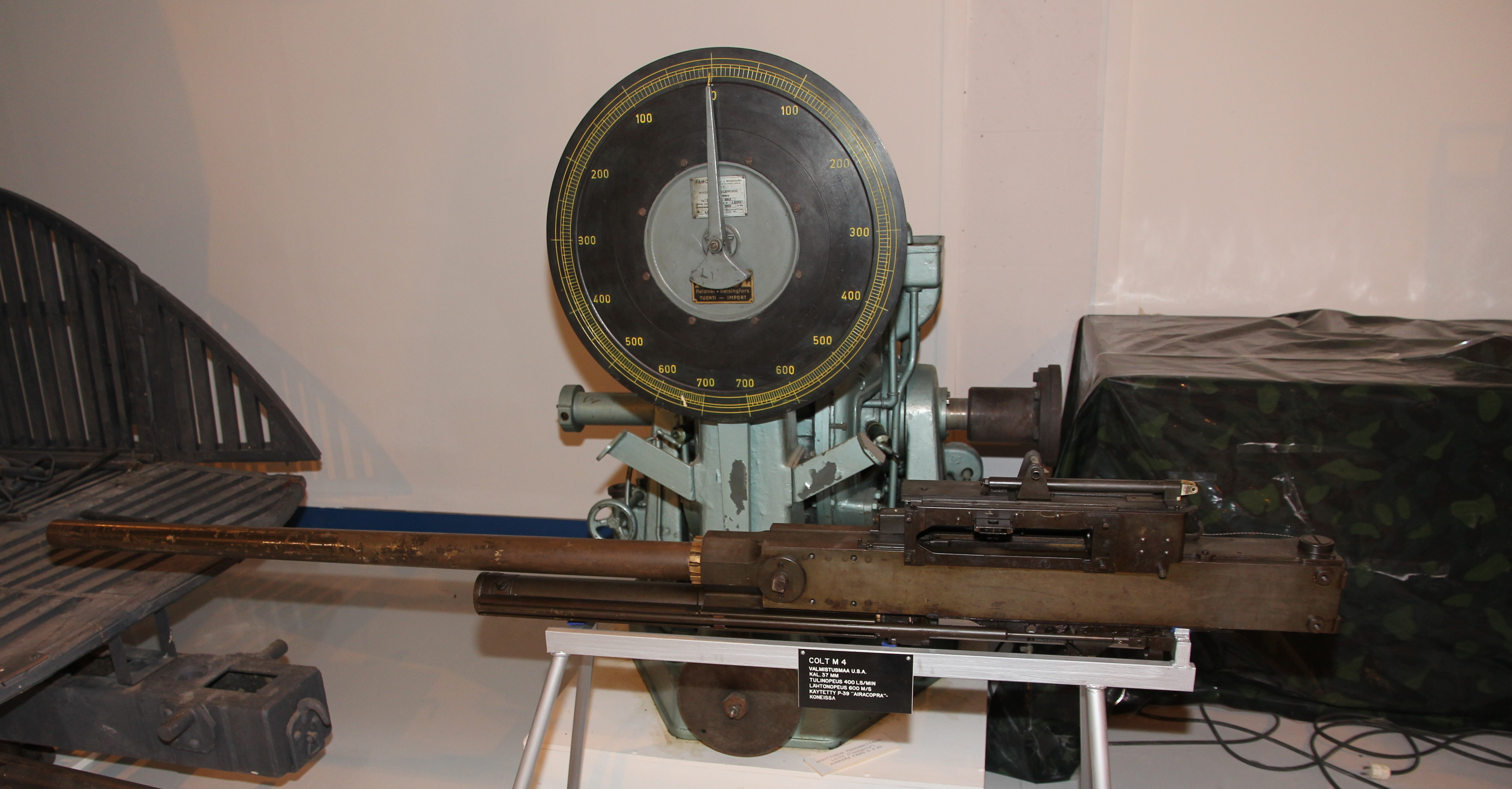
An M4 gun displayed at the Finnish Air Force Museum, 2012

Designed primarily as an anti-aircraft weapon, the gun had a muzzle velocity of 2,000 ft/s (610 m/s) and a cyclic rate of 150 rounds per minute. It was normally loaded with high-explosive shells, but could also be loaded with the M80 armor-piercing shell, which could penetrate 1 inch (25 mm) of armor plate at 500 yd (460 m). It was magazine-fed and could be fired manually or by remote control through a solenoid mounted on the rear of the gun.

Recoil and counter-recoil were controlled hydraulically by means of a piston and spring combination connected to the recoiling mechanism and operating in an oil-filled recuperator cylinder mounted to the stationary trunnion block assembly. The recoiling mechanism of the gun included the tube and tube extension, recuperator piston and piston rod, lock frame assembly, driving spring assemblies, and the breechblock assembly. The nonrecoiling parts included the trunnion block group, the feed box and feeding mechanism, the recuperator cylinder and bushing, the back plate group, and the manual charger assembly.

== Feeding mechanism ==
As the gun was originally designed, ammunition could be fed by a 5-round clip, a 15-round link belt, or a non-disintegrating 30-round endless belt magazine. The 30-round endless belt version was used exclusively in production. The M4 gun fed only from the left.

The 30-round endless belt magazine was given the designation M6; it had an oval-shaped framework (nicknamed a "horsecollar magazine" from its shape) providing a track for the endless belt.

== Firing cycle ==
Initial loading and cocking of the gun were accomplished manually. A safety feature incorporated in the design of the trigger mechanism prevented firing the round until the breech-block assembly was in the battery position.

The breech was locked and unlocked by recoil action which brings the operating level guide pins against cams to raise and lower the breechblock. The function of the breechblock was to assist in the final chambering of the round, close the breech, and actuate the trigger trip. It also provided a mounting for the firing pin.

The lock frame was retracted by recoil action during automatic firing and is forced forward by the driving springs. The major function of the lock frame assembly was to force the cartridge into the chamber, actuate the breech block, fire the round by means of the hammer striking the firing pin, extract the cartridge case from the chamber, and operate the ejector.

The back plate assembly, by absorbing the energy of the lock frame, reduced the shock against the carrier pin as the lock frame was hatched to the rear.

The driving spring assemblies held the lock frame against the carrier dog until the carrier was released by carrier catch which was pivoted by the incoming round. The springs then drove the lock frame assembly forward to operate the ejector, chamber the round and raise the breech block.

Initial extraction occurred during recoil. Extraction, ejection, feeding and loading were accomplished during counter-recoil. If the trigger was held in the firing position, the gun would continue to fire automatically until the magazine was empty.

== US Army Air Forces ==
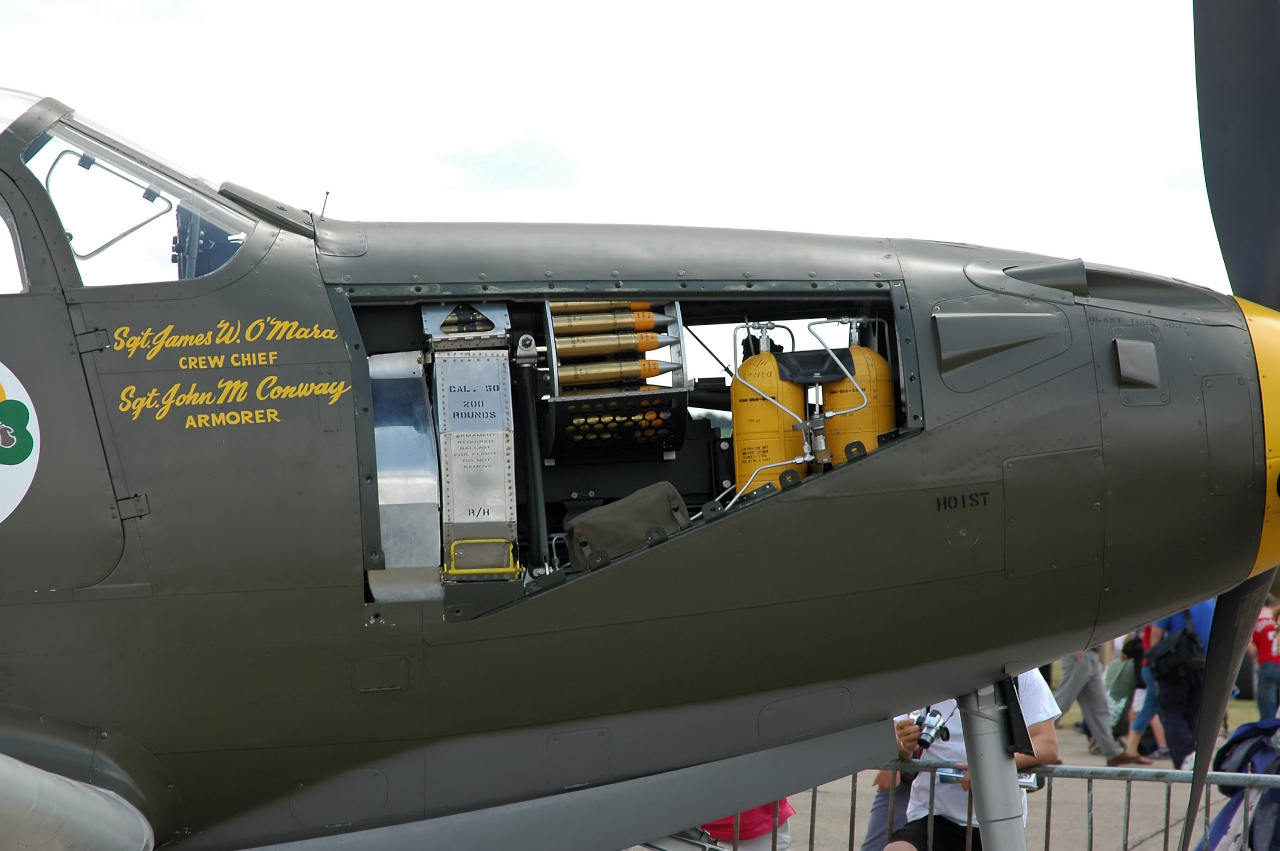
P-39Q Airacobra weapons bay showing the M4 cannon's "horse-collar" drum magazine

The 37 mm cannon was disliked by pilots for its low muzzle velocity, resulting in more pronounced drop than other contemporary weapons.

The only standard aircraft armed with the M4 to see service were the Bell P-39 Airacobra and the derivative P-63 Kingcobra. It was used as a limited standard aircraft in North Africa campaign and the Pacific theater by the USAAF and Allied air forces.

Some YP-38s, the prototype model of the Lockheed P-38 Lightning, mounted a single M4 before the armament scheme was finalized. Production Lightning models would replace the M4 with the AN/M2 20 mm cannon.

The experimental XP-58 "Chain Lightning" was a larger, more heavily armed version of the P-38 Lightning equipped with quadruple M4 cannons instead of .50 caliber M2 Browning heavy machine guns in its nose. Its original purpose (like the German Messerschmitt Bf 110) was to destroy formations of bombers, but it was later re-envisioned as a ground-attack plane. The more pronounced ballistic trajectory was unfamiliar for American pilots, and the four M4s were replaced with a single 75mm M5 cannon and a pair of .50 caliber heavy machine guns.

The first US jet, the Bell P-59 Airacomet, saw two out of three YP-59s and the single XP-59 armed with twin nose-mounted M10 autocannons, a slightly updated and refined version of the M4. Production-model P-59s mounted a single M10 cannon in the nose bearing 45 shells, along with three M2 .50 caliber machine guns bearing 200 rounds each.

== US Navy ==
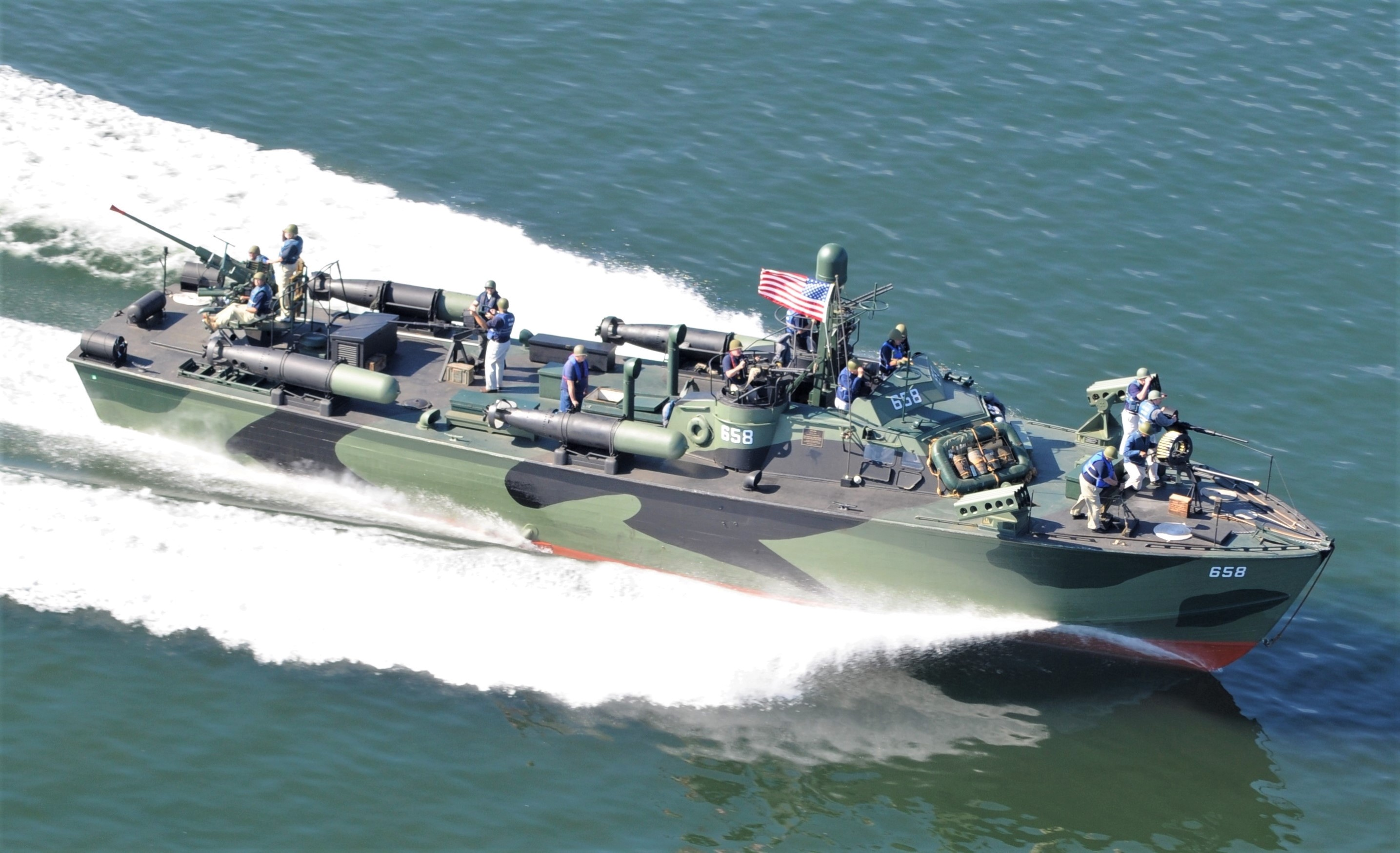
Restored PT658 on the Columbia River, October 2014. Note: M4 37 mm (1.46 in) automatic cannon mounted on the bow.

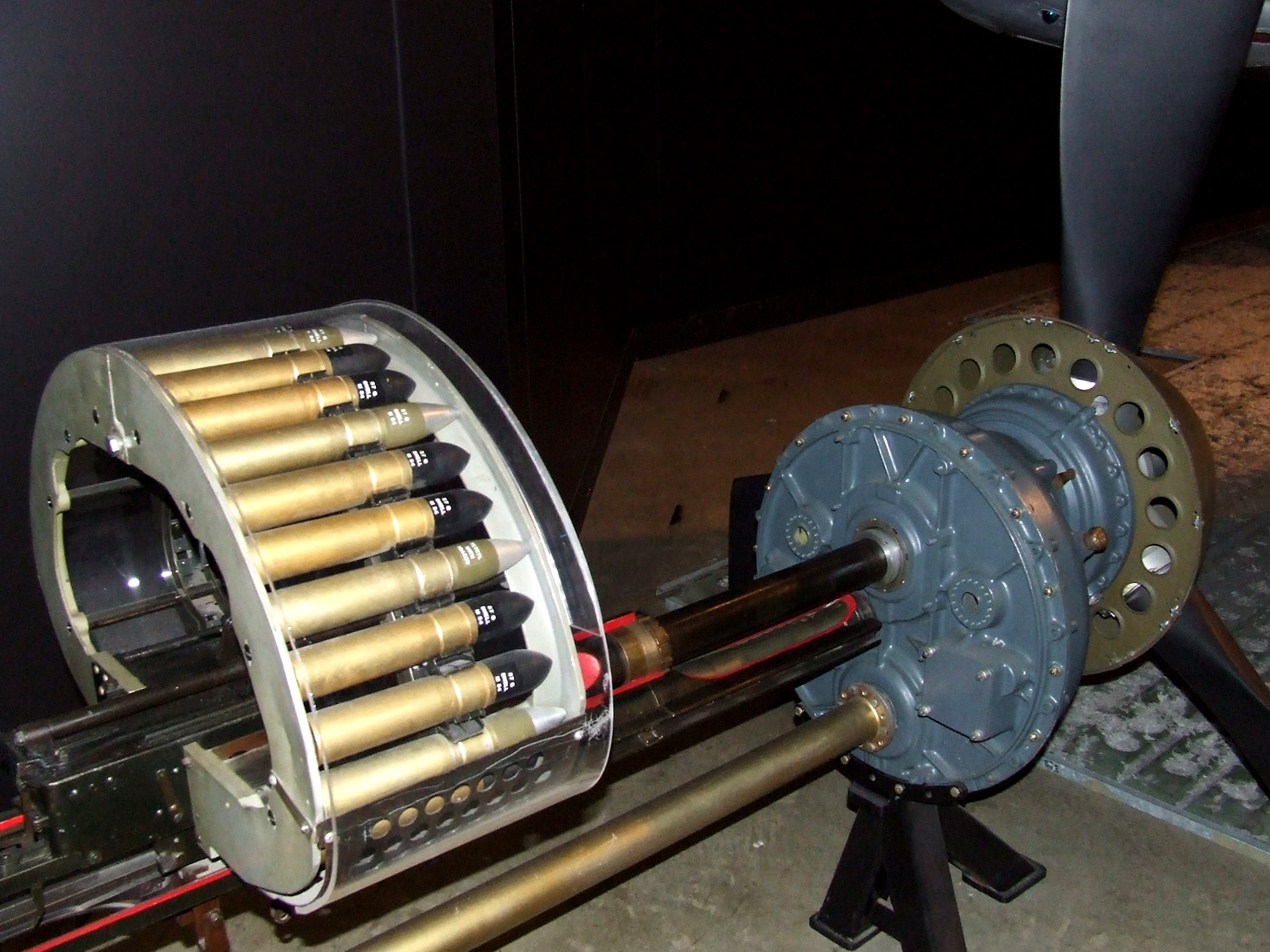
M4 at the National Museum of the United States Air Force

The M4 37 mm (1.46 in) automatic cannon was mounted on numerous US Navy PT boats as deck guns, beginning with the Solomon Islands campaign. Primary targets were the landing barges being used to move supplies down the island chain at night. At first, they were cannibalized from crashed P-39s at Henderson Field, and due to their success as an anti-barge weapon were used for the rest of the war. The M4s were initially mounted on a simple pedestal mount (often built at the front lines) with the standard horseshoe endless-belt feed being used. Later, an improved pedestal mount was designed for original equipment mountings on the boats. Handgrips of several configurations were used with various sights being tried. Most PT boat gunners used tracers to sight the fall of their shot. Beginning in 1944, the M9 model 37 mm (1.46 in) cannon was installed at the builders' boatyard as standard equipment.

== Soviet Air Forces ==
During World War II the United States supplied the Soviet Air Forces with the M4-equipped P-39 Airacobra and P-63 King Cobra. The U.S did not supply M80 armor-piercing rounds for these Lend-Lease aircraft—instead, the Soviets received 1,232,991 M54 high-explosive rounds. The M4 was sometimes employed against soft ground targets on the Eastern Front but was primarily used in air-to-air combat, in which role it was highly effective. The Soviets did not use the P-39 for tank-busting. Soviet pilots appreciated the M4's reliability but complained of its low rate of fire (three rounds per second) and small magazine size (30 rounds).

== US-built contemporaries and successors ==
- The 37 mm M9 autocannon was a derivative of the 37 mm M1A2 flak gun and used the longer, more powerful 37×223mmSR cartridge. Compared to the M4, the M9 had 50% more muzzle velocity (3,000 fps) from a 78-inch barrel (vs. 65-inch in M4), and was twice as heavy (120 vs. 55 pounds for the barrel alone); the whole M9 weighed 405 pounds vs. 213 of the M4. The cyclic rate was the same. Little is known about this gun's deployment; the only confirmed use is in the US Navy PT boats mentioned above.
- The 37 mm M10 autocannon was a minor improvement of the M4. It was fed by metallic disintegrating link belt and had a slightly higher rate of fire at around 165 rpm. The M10 replaced the M4 in aircraft starting with the A-9 model of the Bell P-63 Kingcobra. The disintegrating link belt made it possible to increase ammunition storage in the Bell P-63 Kingcobra from 30 rounds to 58 rounds. The Bell P-59 Airacomet also mounted M10s; Two of three YP-59s and the XP-59 mounted twin nose-mounted M10s, with production models retaining only one.

== See also ==
- COW 37 mm gun: earlier British equivalent

=== Weapons of comparable role, performance and era ===
- Nudelman-Suranov NS-37, Nudelman N-37: Soviet equivalents
- Vickers 40 mm Class S gun: 40mm British equivalent
- Rolls-Royce 40 mm cannon
- Bordkanone BK 3,7: German equivalent
- Ho-203 cannon: Japanese equivalent
