= Bliznyuk =

Bliznyuk or Blyznyuk is a gender-neutral Slavic surname of Ukrainian origin (Близнюк). People with this name include:

- Anastasia Bliznyuk (born 1994), Russian group rhythmic gymnast, Olympian
- Anatoliy Blyznyuk (born 1948), Ukrainian politician and former governor of the Donetsk Oblast
- Bogdan Bliznyuk (born 1995), Ukrainian basketball player
- Gennadi Bliznyuk (born 1980), Belarusian football player and coach
- Illya Blyznyuk (born 1973), Ukrainian football player and coach
- Valentin Bliznyuk (1928–2019), Russian aerospace engineer and aircraft designer
