= BK 3,7 =

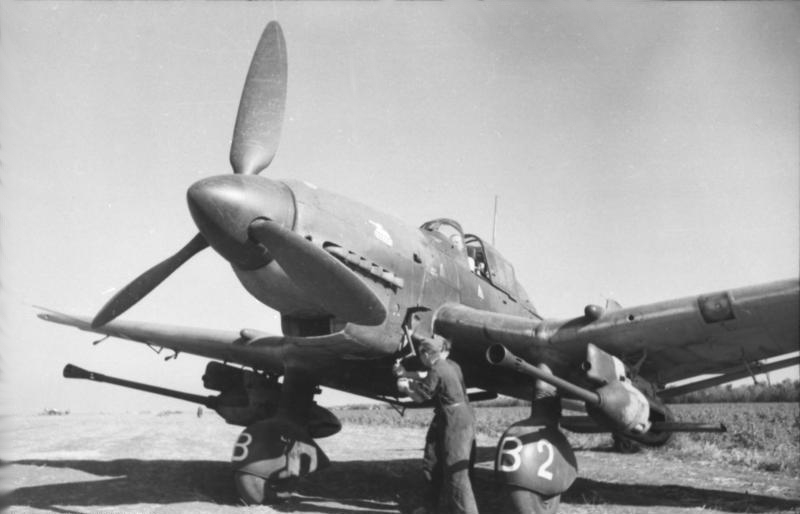
- Hans-Ulrich Rudel's Junkers Ju 87G, with twin BK 3,7 gun pods attached to the underside of the wings, in Russia 1943.
- Type: Aircraft mounted auto-cannon
- Place of origin: Germany

Service history
- In service: 1942–1945
- Used by: Axis powers
- Wars: World War II

Production history
- Manufacturer: Rheinmetall-Borsig

Specifications
- Mass: 295 kg (650 lb)
- Length: 3,750 mm (12 ft 4 in)
- Barrel length: 2,106 mm (6 ft 10.9 in)
- Cartridge: 37×263mmB
- Cartridge weight: (Shell only); APCR 405 g (14.3 oz); HE 640 g (23 oz); AT 680 g (24 oz)
- Caliber: 37 mm (1.46 in)
- Barrels: 1
- Action: Short recoil
- Rate of fire: 160 rpm
- Muzzle velocity: 800–1,140 metres per second (2,600–3,700 ft/s)
- Effective firing range: 500 m (550 yd)

The Bordkanone 3,7 (BK 3,7) ("on-board cannon 3.7") was a German 3.7 cm (1.46 in) anti-tank/bomber autocannon of World War II and based on the earlier 3.7 cm (1.46 in) 3.7 cm Flak 18 made by Rheinmetall.

It was mounted on Luftwaffe aircraft such as the Junkers Ju 87 G-1 and G-2; Henschel Hs 129B-2/R3; Messerschmitt Bf 110G-2/R1-3; Junkers Ju 88P-2 or P-3 and others. The cannon could be attached under the wings or the fuselage of the aircraft as self-contained gun pods with 12-round magazines. It fired Armour Piercing Composite Rigid (APCR, Tungsten-cored) ammunition or high-explosive shells at 160 rounds per minute.

== Service history ==
BK 3,7 equipped ground attack aircraft were developed for tank hunting on the Eastern Front in an effort to blunt the massive numerical superiority of the Soviet T-34 tank as the war turned against Germany. The concept was rather rudimentary, suffered from poor accuracy, severe weight penalty making the craft vulnerable to fighters, and low ammunition capacity; but could be extremely effective when operated by a sufficiently skilled and practised ground-attack pilot, such as Hans-Ulrich Rudel in his BK 3,7 armed Junkers Ju 87G.

The heavy-calibre autocannon-armed series of Junkers Ju 88P twin-engined attack–bomber destroyer aircraft series used twin BK 3,7 cannon, mounted side-by-side in a conformal ventral fuselage gun pod, in its Ju 88P-2 and P-3 versions. The P-3 version differed only through the addition of extra defensive armour. As with other examples of the P-series, the Ju 88P-2 and P-3 were perceived as failures as anti-tank and bomber destroyer aircraft.

In contrast to the bombs delivered by dive bombing, when the BK 3,7 was used to attack the relatively thin armour of the top of the turret and the engine compartment armour of a tank, kills could be achieved with a relatively light and cheap armour-piercing projectile that could be carried in much greater quantities than bombs.

One of the two surviving Junkers Ju 87s is a G-2 model displayed at the Royal Air Force Museum Cosford; the wings have attachment points for BK 3,7 gun pods but it is not displayed with them fitted.

== See also ==
- BK 5 cannon: German 50 mm aircraft cannon
- BK 7,5 cannon: German 75 mm aircraft cannon
- COW 37 mm gun : earlier British equivalent

=== Weapons of comparable role, performance and era ===
- Vickers S gun: 40-mm British equivalent
- Ho-203 cannon: Japanese equivalent
- Oldsmobile M4 cannon: US equivalent
- Nudelman-Suranov NS-37: Soviet equivalent
- Nudelman N-37: Soviet postwar successor
- Ordnance QF 2-pounder

== Bibliography ==
- Williams, Anthony G. (2000). Rapid Fire: The Development Of Automatic Cannon, Heavy Machine Guns And Their Ammunition For Armies, Navies And Air Forces. Shrewsbury, UK: Airlife Publishing. pp. 168–9. ISBN 1-84037-435-7.
