= Nudelman-Suranov NS-45 =

- Type: Autocannon
- Place of origin: USSR

Service history
- In service: 1944–1947
- Used by: USSR
- Wars: Second World War, Cold War

Production history
- Produced: 1944–1945
- No. built: ~200

Specifications
- Mass: 152 kilograms (335 lb)
- Length: 363.5 centimetres (11.93 ft)
- Barrel length: 230.5 centimetres (7.56 ft)
- Shell: 45×186 mm
- Shell weight: 1.065 kg (2.35 lb)
- Caliber: 45 millimetres (1.8 in)
- Action: short recoil
- Rate of fire: 260–280 rpm
- Muzzle velocity: 780 metres per second (2,600 ft/s)
- Feed system: belt

The Nudelman-Suranov NS-45 was an enlarged version of the Soviet Nudelman-Suranov NS-37 aircraft autocannon. It was evaluated for service on 44 Yakovlev Yak-9K aircraft during World War II, but proved to stress the airframes too much. The NS-45 was also mounted on the prototype Tupolev Tu-1 night fighter after the end of World War II.

== Design and development ==
The NS-45 was created as a result of a July 1943 decision of the State Defense Committee to arm Soviet fighters with 45 mm autocannons. As with the 37 mm autocannons already installed in some Soviet and lend-lease single-engine fighters, the intended method of installation of the 45 mm gun was to have its barrel pass through the engine block and the empty propeller shaft, in this case that of the Yak-9. Consequently, the main difficulty in designing the 45 mm autocannon was the limitation imposed by the engine blocks available for this aircraft. Accounting for the diameter of the 45 mm shell, the Yak-9 engine blocks only allowed a wall thickness of 4 mm for the new gun's barrel, which was almost half the thickness of the barrel wall of the NS-37. (Another source gives 55 mm as the diameter of opening in the engine reducer shaft, resulting in a wall thickness of 3.75 mm for the NS-45 barrel relative to 7.1 mm for the NS-37 barrel, both measured at this spot which was approximately 61 cm away from the muzzle.)

The decision of the Defense Committee was followed by a short design competition between Soviet designs bureaus OKB-15 and OKB-16. The former proposed an enlarged version of their unreliable Shpitalny Sh-37; although they made a prototype that passed factory tests in a LaGG-3, their 45 mm gun was not accepted for state trials because of the known issues with the Sh-37 design. OKB-16 presented an enlarged version of their successful NS-37. The recoil force of the NS-45 peaked at seven tons, a force roughly 40% greater than that experienced with the NS-37 (about 5.5 tons). Consequently, the NS-45 was fitted with a muzzle brake—a first in Soviet aircraft-gun design.

Concomitantly with the gun design, a new cartridge was developed using the standard 45 mm fragmentation shell of the 21-K anti-aircraft gun. (This projectile had a tracer that burned for eleven seconds and was fitted with the MG-8 contact fuse.) The total length of the new cartridge was limited to the same value as for the NS-37 ammunition—328mm. In order to accommodate the larger shell, the case body (brass) was necked up and also slightly reduced in length from 195 mm of the NS-37 ammunition to 185 mm. The resulting 45 mm cartridge weighted 1.93 kg, of which 1.065 kg was the weight of its shell. The muzzle velocity of the NS-45 was 780 m/s and its rate of fire was around 260–280 rounds per minute.

== Production and service ==
The NS-45 was built in small numbers at Factory Number 74 in the last two years of the war; 75 exemplars were made in 1944 and 120 were made in 1945.

=== Yak-9K ===
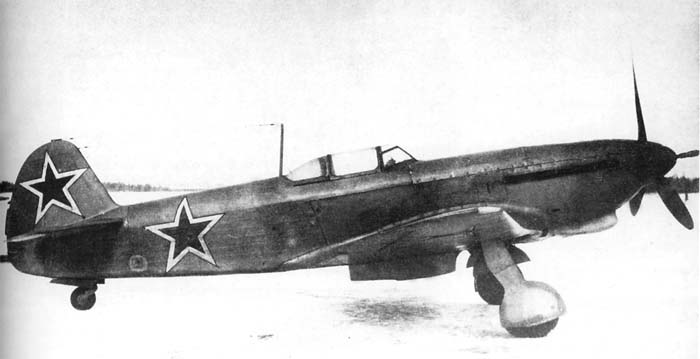
This Yak-9T modified to take the NS-45 gun became the first Yak-9K prototype

In fighters, the NS-45 gun was first installed on a modified Yak-9T, which was normally armed with a NS-37 gun. This aircraft, with constructor number 0121, effectively became the first Yak-9K prototype. The "K" suffix stood for "Krupnokalibernyi", meaning large caliber. The protruding barrel and muzzle brake of the NS-45 made the Yak-9K some 20 cm longer than the Yak-9T. The NS-45 was supplied with 29 rounds of ammunition in the Yak-9K, which were fed using a belt. The only other armament installed on the Yak-9K was a UBS (a propeller-synchronized 12.7 mm machine gun) supplied with 200 rounds of ammunition. The theoretical weight of fire of the Yak-9K was 5.53 kg/s (12.2 lb/s), which gave it a considerable advantage in this department relative to most single-engine German aircraft of the time except the "flying gun-batteries" such as the Fw 190A-6/R1 or the Bf 109G-6/R6. Compared to these, the Yak-9K maintained however good horizontal maneuverability because its wings were not loaded with armament.

Developed in late 1943, the Yak-9K prototype was tested at the Central Research Institute of the Soviet Air Force (VVS NII) between January 12 and April 8, 1944. Between April and June 1944 a limited production run of the aircraft, with the cockpit pushed further to the back to improve the center of gravity, was manufactured at a plant in Novosibirsk and delivered for military trials to the 3rd Fighter Air Corps. For military (combat) trials 44 Yak-9Ks of this limited production run were used. These trials took place between 13 August and 18 September 1944 at the 3rd Belorussian Front, and from 15 January 1945 to 15 February 1945 at the 2nd Belorussian Front. The Soviet Air Forces units involved were the 274th Fighter Aviation Regiment (IAP) of the 278th Fighter Aviation Division (IAD) and the 812nd IAP of the 65th IAD. Twelve German aircraft were claimed by Yak-9K fighters, with an average expenditure of ten rounds per target. Of these twelve German aircraft claimed by Yak-9K pilots, eight were Fw 190 and four were Bf 109G.

Combat experience with the Yak-9K showed that although the NS-45 cannon proved deadly to enemy aircraft, realistically only its first shot could be aimed. A three-round burst, even when fired near the maximum airspeed of the Yak-9K, resulted in a noticeable loss of both airspeed and stability of the aircraft. Sometimes oil and water lines sprung leaks after the gun was fired. Firing the NS-45 at airspeeds below 350 km/h even shook the pilot back and forth as if in an automobile suddenly decelerating and accelerating.

Another issue affecting the effectiveness of the Yak-9K was that it had a poorer power to weight ratio compared to its proximate predecessor, although this was mostly due to its larger fuel tanks rather than the weight of the armament; its fuel tanks had been enlarged from the 440-liter tanks of Yak-9T to 650-liter tanks, allowing it to carry an additional 153 kg of gasoline. The loss of airspeed relative to the Yak-9T was about 40 km/h at 5,000 m, and climbing to this altitude took about a minute longer with the Yak-9K. In an attempt to address this problem, some of the Yak-9K already in service were retrofitted with smaller 480-liter tanks. To compensate for the Yak-9K's poor maneuverability in the vertical plane, pilots of the 812th IAP developed tactics that essentially employed the aircraft as a heavy fighter, using it for surprise attacks on bombers, and providing it with an escort by nimbler Yak-3s flying top cover. Ultimately, it was decided that the Yak-9K would not go into mass production. Besides the reliability and airframe performance issues, another contributory reason was that the German bombers still active on the Eastern front at this point in the war were mainly Fw 190 Jabo, and the 45 mm shell was overkill for these. A total of 53 Yak-9Ks had been built by then.

=== Other aircraft ===
The NS-45 was also tried on an Ilyushin Il-2, with one gun mounted in each wing, but the design was not put into series production. On August 20, 1943, the People's Commissariat of Aviation Industry of the USSR ordered that an Il-2 be tested with the new 45 mm aircraft guns. An Il-2 exemplar fitted with the new guns had been manufactured by September 10, 1943, when it was sent to the VVS NII for trials. Due to various issues which arose integrating the NS-45 gun with this aircraft, testing was delayed until February 8, 1944. The results were disappointing; the Il-2-mounted NS-45s exhibited poor accuracy hitting tank-size targets and their recoil was almost twice what the Il-2's wings could safely handle (about 4000 tons-force).

One of the three versions of the prototype ground attack (shturmovik) Tu-2Sh was equipped with two NS-37s and two NS-45s as frontal armament. This variant was tested sometime in 1946. A more substantial test program took place between 30 December 1946 and 3 October 1947 with the Tupolev Tu-1 night fighter prototype, which was fitted with two NS-45s in the nose—each one supplied with 50 rounds—and with two NS-23s in the wing roots. The Tu-1 was abandoned because of its unreliable engines.

== See also ==
- BK 5 cannon
- Ho-401 cannon
- N-57/OKB-16-57
