= 37×145mmR =

Type of Cannon Ammunition

The 37×145mmR was a series of rimmed-case, fixed-ammunition cannon shells for use in the 37mm Browning M4 autocannon.

The rapid strides in aircraft protection made it necessary to develop an aircraft weapon that would fire projectiles with greater explosive and armor-piercing qualities than smaller caliber weapons. As a result, the 37 mm (1.46 in) T9 automatic gun was developed. It was standardized for aircraft use as the M4 cannon in 1942.

The 37 mm (1.46 in) gun, M4, used the same high-explosive (M54) and practice (M55A1) projectiles as the 37 mm (1.46 in) antiaircraft gun, M1A2, but different cartridge cases were necessary due to the larger chamber of the M4 gun. The M4 was later replaced by the more powerful 37mm M9 autocannon.

== Ammunition ==
Ammunition was issued in the form of fixed rounds, consisting of:

- H.E.T. shell, M54, with Point-Detonating fuze, M56
- Practice shell, M55A1, with dummy fuze, M50
- A.P. shot, M80.

=== High-explosive Tracer shell, 37 mm, M54 standard ===
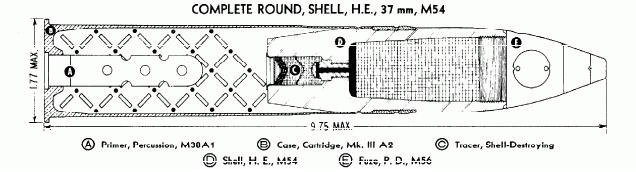

This shell used the M56 point detonating fuze. The complete round weighs 1.99 lb (900 g); as fired, the projectile weighs 1.34 lb (610 g). The 0.16 lb (73 g) charge of M2 powder is a Hercules NG formula of single perforated grains with 0.03 in (0.76 mm) web and gives the projectile the prescribed muzzle velocity of 2,000 ft/s (610 m/s).

The M54 used a shell-destroying tracer in addition to the point-detonating fuze. The tracer had a burning time of three seconds at the end of which it set off an igniting relay charge of 1.68 gr (0.109 g) of Grade A-5 Army Black Powder which ignited a relay pellet that detonated the charge, destroying the shell before ground impact.

The bursting charge of tetryl weighed 0.10 lb (45 g), and the alternate Composition "A" charge weighs 0.105 lb (48 g). The tetryl loading consisted of a 200 gr (13 g) tetryl pellet pressed into the shell cavity under 9,000-10,000 psi (60-70 MPa) pressure and the remainder of the charge of two equal increments pressed under approximately 9,000 psi (62 MPa) pressure. The Composition "A" bursting charge is loaded in the same manner as the tetryl charge, except that the relay pellet with the Composition "A" weighs 36 gr (2.3 g) as against 23 gr (1.5 g) for the pellet used with the tetryl load.

=== Practice shell, 37 mm, M55A1 standard ===
This shell was the high-explosive shell modified slightly for practice purposes. It contained a red tracer and a dummy fuze (M50, M50B1, M50B2 or M50B3). The M50 dummy fuze was made from a plastic composition and the M50B1, M50B2 and M50B3 fuzes were made from low carbon steel machined to give the same contour and weight as the point-detonating fuze, M56, used with the M54 projectile.

As used in the M4, the complete round weighed 1.99 lb (900 g), and as fired the shell weighed 1.34 lb (610 g). The 0.16 lb (73 g) charge of M2 powder was Hercules NG formula of single perforated grains with a 0.03 in (0.76 mm) web and gave the prescribed muzzle velocity of 2,000 ft/s (610 m/s).

=== Armor-piercing shot, 37 mm, M80 standard ===
The overall length of the 37mm M-74 AP-T (Armor-Piercing shot with Tracer) and M-51 APCBC-T (Armor-Piercing Composite Ballistic-Capped shot with Tracer) armor-piercing projectiles used in the M3A1, M5A1, and M6 tank and antitank guns (37×223mmR), was too great to permit their use in the M4 gun. The 37 mm M80 AP-T shot was developed and standardized.

The M80 Armor-Piercing Tracer shot was a monoblock projectile with a tracer element of three seconds burning time. It did not need a fuze or bursting charge. The weight of the complete round was 2.31 lb (1.05 kg), the weight of the AP shot was 1.66 lb (750 g). The propelling charge was 0.15 lb (68 g) of M2 powder of a Hercules NG formula with a single-perforated grain and 0.03 in (0.76 mm) web.

== See also ==
- List of rimmed cartridges
