= Tupolev Tu-12 =

Experimental Soviet medium bomber

Tu-12
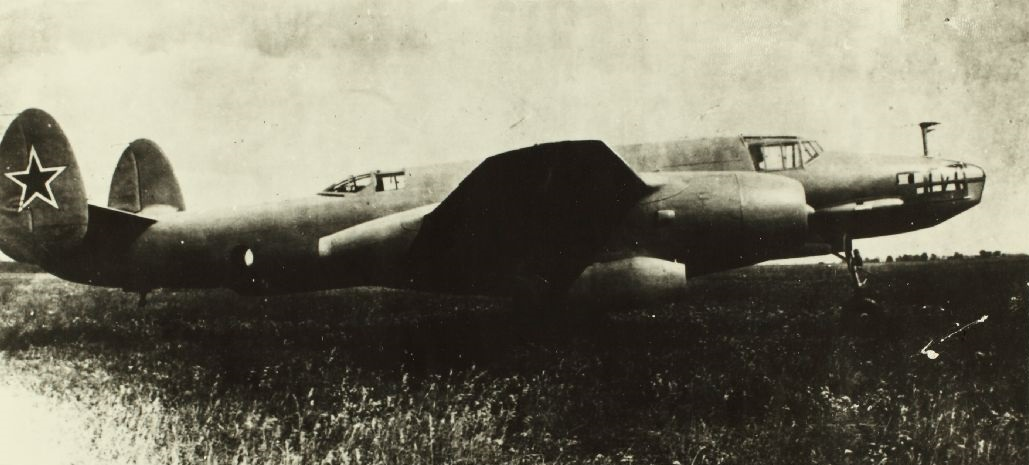

General information
- Type: Five-seat medium bomber
- Manufacturer: Tupolev
- Designer: Andrei Tupolev
- Primary user: Soviet Air Force
- Number built: 5 + 1 prototype

History
- First flight: 27 July 1947
- Developed from: Tupolev Tu-2

The Tupolev Tu-12 (development designation Tu-77) was an experimental Soviet jet-powered medium bomber developed from the successful piston-engined Tupolev Tu-2 bomber after the end of World War II. It was designed as an interim aircraft to familiarize Tupolev and the Soviet Air Forces (VVS) with the issues involved with jet-engined bombers.

== Development ==
The Tupolev Tu-73 jet-engined bomber project was suffering delays in early 1947 and Tupolev suggested re-engining the Tu-2 medium bomber with imported British Rolls-Royce Nene jet engines to produce a jet bomber as quickly as possible. Design work began well before official approval was received on 31 May 1947 for one Tu-2S to be converted in the OKB's workshop and another five to be converted at Zavod (Factory) Nr. 23, but construction of the prototype had already begun in early May under the bureau designation Tu-77.

Changes from the standard Tu-2 were minimized to speed production and they consisted of the following:

- Two Nene jet engines replaced the standard Shvetsov ASh-82FN radial engines.
- The wing dihedral was reduced to 3° from 6°.
- The fuselage was lengthened 400 mm (16 in) and the rear fuselage was heightened by 300 mm (12 in).
- A new tricycle undercarriage was fitted, with the main gear units retracting into the engine nacelles.
- Additional fuel tanks were fitted and the design of the tanks was changed to accommodate the change from gasoline to kerosene.
- The control system was revised and trim tabs were fitted to the elevators.
- The wing and tail were reinforced.
- The 20 mm (0.79 in) ShVAK cannon were removed from the wing roots and a 23 mm (0.91 in) Nudelman-Suranov NS-23 cannon was mounted in an external fairing on the starboard side of the nose.

=== Testing and evaluation ===
The prototype was completed in July and was first flown on 27 July 1947. Two aircraft were shown at the Tushino Aviation Day parade on 3 August 1947. It completed manufacturer's trials in September and underwent the state acceptance trials from 4 October 1947 to 27 February 1948 when it was redesignated as the Tu-12. The NII VVS (Naoochno-Issledovatel'skiy Institoot Voyenno-Vozdooshnykh Seel – Air Force Scientific Test Institute) report summarized the differences between the Tu-2 and Tu-12 as "a considerable gain in speed, an improved rate of climb, a higher service ceiling, but poorer field performance and a considerably greater fuel load required to achieve the same range as the Tu-2." Both the lack of a pressurized cabin that greatly reduced its effectiveness at high altitude and the lack of deicing equipment for the wing and tail leading edges and the cockpit glazing were noted as major problems. At high speeds it was virtually impossible to traverse and elevate the manually operated VUB-68 and Lu-68 gun turrets. The vibration of the NS-23 cannon when firing rendered the equipment in the navigator's cabin unusable and damaged the cabin glazing. Turning on the Identification friend or foe (IFF) system adversely affected the intercom system and the radios. New generators had to be installed as the originals did not produce enough electrical power.

The trials conducted by the NII VVS included engagements between the Tu-12 and the Soviet MiG-9 and Yak-23 jet fighters which were very useful in evaluating the offensive armament of the fighters, the defensive armament of the bomber and the proper tactics involved for both types of aircraft. The tests demonstrated the inferiority of the current 12.7 mm (0.50 in) armament and meant that every Soviet bomber henceforth would have a defensive armament using power-operated turrets that carried 20 mm or larger guns.

The five aircraft modified by the factory were given the Klimov RD-45 engine, the Soviet unlicensed copy of the Nene engine, and all six aircraft were used by the VVS for aircrew familiarization and training. The aircraft completed were later relegated to test duties. One aircraft was used for drone tests and another, redesignated as the Tu-12LL, mounted various pulse jet engines on a pylon above the fuselage.

== Operators ==
Soviet Union

- Soviet Air Force

== Specifications (Tu-12) ==
Data from Tupolev Aircraft since 1922

General characteristics

- Crew: five
- Length: 16.45 m (53 ft 11.5 in)
- Wingspan: 18.86 m (61 ft 10.5 in)
- Wing area: 48.80 m^{2} (525.30 sq ft)
- Empty weight: 8,993 kg (19,826 lb)
- Gross weight: 15,720 kg (34,657 lb)
- Powerplant: 2 × Rolls-Royce Nene I turbojet , 22 kN (5,000 lbf) thrust each

Performance

- Maximum speed: 783 km/h (487 mph, 423 kn)
- Range: 2,200 km (1,367 mi, 1,188 nmi)
- Service ceiling: 11,370 m (37,305 ft)

Armament

- 1 × 23 mm NS-23 cannon
- 2 × 12.7 mm Berezin UBT machine-guns
- 3,000 kg (6,614 lb) of bombs
