= Tupolev Tu-8 =

Type of aircraft

Tu-8
- Front-quarter view of the Tu-8 prototype

General information
- Type: Long-range bomber
- National origin: Soviet Union
- Manufacturer: Tupolev
- Status: Cancelled
- Number built: 1

History
- First flight: 24 May 1947
- Developed from: Tupolev Tu-2

The Tupolev Tu-8, OKB designation '69', was a long-range variant of the Soviet Tupolev Tu-2 medium bomber that first flew after the end of World War II. It was canceled when it proved to be unstable, structurally unsound and its generators were not strong enough to fully power its gun turrets. With the advent of jet-powered bombers, Soviet military planners decided that it simply was not worth devoting the necessary resources to fix its numerous problems.

== Development ==
After the end of World War II the Tupolev OKB decided to continue its development of long-range variants of the Tu-2 which had begun with the unsuccessful Tu-2D during the war. Internally designated as the ANT-69, it was originally planned to use the new Shvetsov M-93 radial engines, but this was changed to the Shvetsov ASh-82M when the M-93 engine was delayed. It was to be armed with 20 mm (0.79 in) Berezin B-20 cannon on the existing mounts. The fuselage nose was completely revised in response to complaints by the VVS about the Tu-2. The navigator was given a seat and the nose was extensively glazed to improve his view. The cockpit was revised to seat the pilots side by side rather than in tandem and the ventral gunner was also given a seat. The revision of the nose caused the twin tails to be enlarged to offset the greater area ahead of the aircraft's center of gravity.

The defensive armament's gun turrets were electrically powered and the ventral gunner was given a remotely-controlled turret. He sighted the turret through prominent blisters in the rear fuselage. The copilot could turn his seat 180° and manned a B-20 gun in the rear of the pilot's compartment. The Tu-8 was fitted with an OPB-4S Norden-type bombsight and had its maximum bombload increased to 4,500 kg (9,900 lb). It was intended to be able to carry mines or torpedoes for service with Soviet Naval Aviation.

This concept was approved by the Council of Ministers on 11 March 1947. The ANT-62T prototype torpedo bomber was modified as the prototype of the Tu-8. That aircraft's ASh-82FN engines were retained rather than use the ASh-83M engines originally planned. It was first flown on 24 May 1947 and kept on manufacturer's trials until 20 April 1948. These trials were prolonged by the numerous difficulties experienced, especially with the defensive armament. It began State trials on 23 August 1948 which lasted until 30 November 1948. The report of the NII VVS (Russian: Научно-Исследовательский Институт Военно-Воздушных Сил Nauchno-Issledovatel'skiy Institut Voyenno-Vozdushnykh Sil – Air Force Scientific Test Institute) was unfavorable:

The performance was not commensurate with the directives stated in the Government Directive for the development of the aircraft. The machine was unstable at all the normal center of gravity positions, the wings and undercarriage were insufficiently strong, the defensive armament proved to be less than fully effective due to the inadequate power provided to the gun mounts by the generators, and the deicing and lighting equipment were inadequate, thus restricting the aircraft's operations in bad weather.

Tupolev made unsolicited proposals for variants, including the Tu-8B with Mikulin AM-42 engines and the Tu-8S with Charomski ACh-30BF diesel engines, but none were accepted. Soviet military planners had decided to devote resources to development of jet bombers, such as the Tupolev '73', which were already flying, and which exhibited much more potential than piston-engined aircraft.

== Variants ==
Tu-8
Initial version, powered by radial engines.
Tu-8B
Tu-8 powered by Mikulin AM-42 inline engines.
Tu-8S
Tu-8 powered by Charomskiy ACh-30BF diesel engines.
'72'
Jet powered version powered by Rolls-Royce Nene I engines, given the official designation Tu-18 2 x Nene I.

== Specifications ==
Data from Gordon, OKB Tupolev: A History of the Design Bureau and its Aircraft

General characteristics

- Crew: five
- Length: 14.61 m (47 ft 11.13 in)
- Wingspan: 22.06 m (72 ft 4.5 in)
- Height: 5.15 m (16 ft 10.75 in)
- Wing area: 61.26 m^{2} (659 sq ft)
- Gross weight: 14,250 kg (31,416 lb)
- Powerplant: 2 × Shvetsov ASh-82FN radial engines , 1,380 kW (1,850 hp) each

Performance

- Maximum speed: 507 km/h (315 mph, 274 kn)
- Range: 4,100 km (2,548 mi, 2,214 nmi)
- Service ceiling: 7,650 m (25,100 ft)

Armament

- 5 x 20 mm (0.79 in) Berezin B-20 cannon
- up to 4,500 kg (9,900 lb) of bombs
