= Nudelman-Suranov NS-37 =

Nudelman—Suranov NS-37
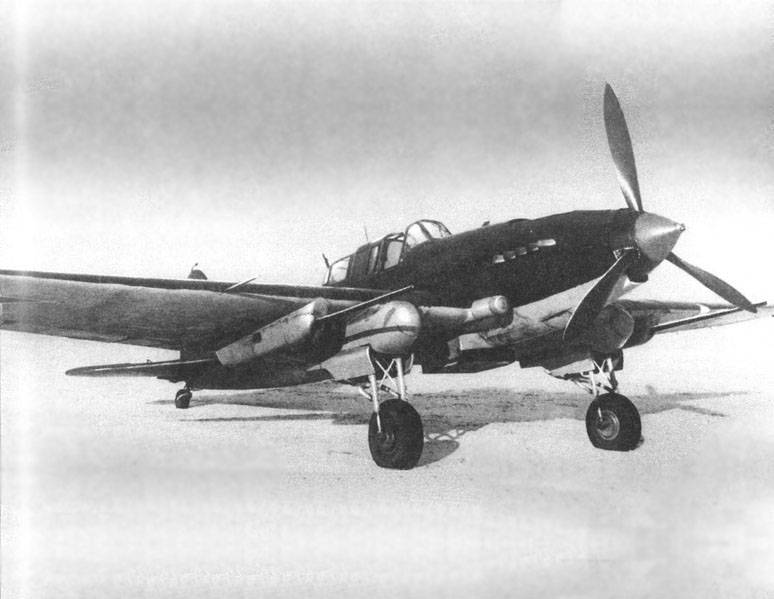
- Il-2 with NS-37 cannon in under-wing pods
- Type: Autocannon
- Place of origin: Soviet Union

Service history
- In service: 1943–1945
- Used by: Soviet Union
- Wars: World War II

Production history
- Designer: A. E. Nudelman and A. Suranov
- Designed: 1941
- Manufacturer: Izhmash
- Produced: 1942–1945
- No. built: 6833

Specifications
- Mass: 170/160 kg (with motor/wing mount)
- Length: 3.41 m
- Barrel length: 2.3 m
- Width: 21.5 cm
- Height: 41.5 cm
- Cartridge: 37×198 mm
- Barrels: 1
- Action: short recoil
- Rate of fire: 240–260 rpm
- Muzzle velocity: 900 m/s (HE, HEI-T), 880 m/s (AP-T)
- Feed system: Belt

The Nudelman-Suranov NS-37 (Russian: Нудельман - Суранов НС-37) was a 37-millimetre (1.5 in) aircraft cannon, which replaced the unreliable Shpitalny Sh-37 gun. Large caliber was planned to allow destruction of both ground targets (including armoured ones) and planes (ability to shoot down a bomber with a single hit).

Developed by A. E. Nudelman and A. Suranov from OKB-16 Construction Bureau from 1941, it was tested at the front in 1943 and subsequently ordered into production, which lasted until 1945. It was used on the LaGG-3 and Yak-9T fighter planes (mounted between the vee of the engine, in motornaya pushka mounts) and Il-2 ground attack planes (in underwing pods).

Although the heavy round offered large firepower, the relatively low rate of fire and heavy recoil made hitting targets difficult. While pilots were trained to fire short bursts, on light aircraft only the first shot was truly aimed. Additionally, penetration of medium and heavy tanks' top armour was possible only at high angles (above 40 degrees), which was hard to achieve in battle conditions. For these reasons it was soon replaced in 1946 by the N-37 autocannon, which used a lighter 37×155 mm round.

== See also ==
- Nudelman-Suranov NS-45 : larger Soviet version
- Nudelman N-37 : postwar Soviet version

=== Weapons of comparable role, performance and era ===
- Vickers S : 40-mm British equivalent
- M4 cannon : US equivalent
- BK 37 : German equivalent
- Ho-203 cannon : Japanese equivalent
