= Tupolev '73' =

Soviet trijet medium bomber

'73'
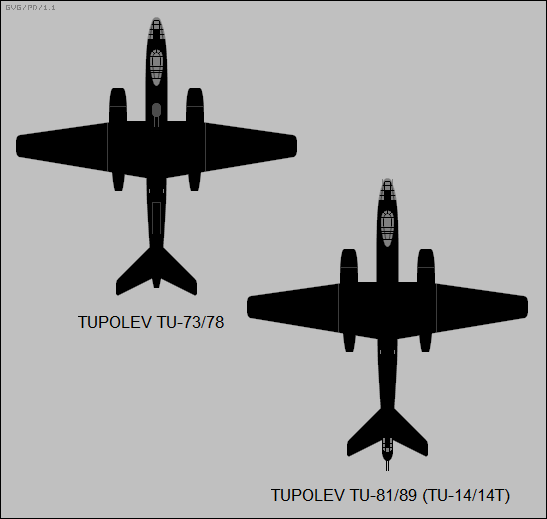

General information
- Type: Medium bomber
- Manufacturer: Tupolev
- Designer: Sergei Yeger
- Status: Cancelled
- Primary user: Soviet Naval Aviation

History
- First flight: 29 December 1947
- Developed from: Tupolev Tu-72
- Developed into: Tupolev Tu-14

The Tupolev '73', (samolyot 73), was a Soviet trijet medium bomber of the late 1940s. It lost out to the Ilyushin Il-28 'Beagle'.

== Development ==
The Tupolev OKB continued to develop the Tu-2 line with the advent of gas turbine power-plants. The Tu-8 ('69') was redesigned with two Rolls-Royce Nene I turbojet engines, replacing the piston engines in new nacelles. The new design was given the OKB designation '72' and official designation Tu-18 2 × Nene I, but was abandoned due to the more promising '73' design soaking up resources.

Following the general arrangement of the Tu-2- Tu-8, '72', the initial '73' short-range bomber (official designation; Tu-20 2 × Nene I) had a shoulder mounted wing, a large unswept fin and rudder with integral dorsal fin, tri-cycle undercarriage and engines in long under-slung nacelles at about 1/3 span, which also housed the main undercarriage legs, when retracted. Before the design was finalised it was discovered that the Nene I engines were producing less power than expected; 19.57 kN (4,400 lbf) and not the expected 22.26 kN (5,004 lbf), necessitating the addition of a Rolls-Royce Derwent V booster engine in the rear fuselage, exhausting at the base of the fin.

The three-engined '73' (official designation; Tu-14 2 × Nene I + 1 × Derwent V) was accepted for development and the '73' first flew on 29 December 1947, with flight tests continuing until 31 May 1949, with promising results, resulting in a production order for ten '73S' pre-production prototypes, powered by RD-45 and RD-500 (Soviet production Nene and Derwent engines). None of the pre-production order were completed but parts manufactured at GAZ-23 were absorbed by the Tupolev Tu-14 production line at GAZ-39.

Further development of the '73' line resulted in the photo-reconnaissance '73R' / '78' (official designation; Tu-16 2 × Nene I + 1 × Derwent V). The '78' was outwardly identical to the '73' with the exception of a retractable conical shutter over the intake of the rear fuselage Derwent at the forward end of the dorsal fillet. The '78' first flew on 7 May 1948 and conducted flight trials of the photographic equipment, which were unsatisfactory. Improvements to the photographic equipment notwithstanding the Council of Ministers cancelled all further development or production of the '73', '78' and '79' on 14 May 1949.

Two more phot-recce projects were designed both similar to the '73' and '78'. The first '79' (official designation; Tu-30 2 × Nene I + 1 × Derwent V) was not proceeded with. The second '79' (official designation; Tu-20 2 × VK-1 + 1 x RD-500), was to have utilised an uncompleted '73S' airframe but development was cancelled as noted above.

The VVS (Voyenno-Vozdushnyye Sily - Soviet air force) rejected the three-engined bombers as they were averse to fielding aircraft with two engine types. They were also more in favour of the Ilyushin Il-28 for medium bomber roles. The AV-MF (Aviatsiya Voyenno-Morskogo Flota - naval aviation), however, were in need of a torpedo bomber which was developed from the final '73' iteration, the '81 (official designation; Tu-14 2 × VK-1) as the '81T' (official designation; Tu-14T 2 × VK-1). Production aircraft were delivered to the AV-MF as the Tupolev Tu-14T.

== Variants ==
Data from: OKB Tupolev: A History of the Design Bureau and its Aircraft

'72'
Initial project for a tactical bomber powered by two Rolls-Royce Nene I turbojet engines, derived from the Tupolev '69' (Tu-8), not built.

Tu-18 2 x Nene I: official designation.

'73'
Initial short range bomber project, powered by two Rolls-Royce Nene I turbojet engines, not built.

Tu-20 2 x Nene I: official designation.

'73'
experimental bomber project, powered by two Rolls-Royce Nene I and one Rolls-Royce Derwent V turbojet engines, one built.

Tu-14 2 x Nene I + 1 x Derwent V: official designation.
'73S': Ten pre-production prototypes ordered but only partially completed before cancellation.
'73R': original OKB designation for the '78' photo-recce design.

'78'
Reconnaissance version, powered by Rolls-Royce engines, one built.

Tu-16 2 x Nene I + 1 x Derwent V: official designation.

'79'
initial project for a photo-recce aircraft based on the '73'

Tu-30 2 x Nene I + 1 x Derwent V: official designation.

'79'
'78' powered by Klimov VK-1 Soviet-built Rolls-Royce engines. Originally designated '73R'.

Tu-20 2 x VK-1 + 1 x RD-500: official designation.

'81'
Twin-engined medium bomber development of '73'.

Tu-14 2 x VK-1: official designation.

'81T'
Twin-engined torpedo bomber development of '73' for the AV-MF.

Tu-14T 2 x VK-1: official designation.

== Specifications ('73' / Tu-14 2 × Nene I + 1 × Derwent V) ==
Data from OKB Tupolev: A History of the Design Bureau and its Aircraft

General characteristics

- Crew: 4
- Length: 20.32 m (66 ft 8 in)
- Wingspan: 21.7 m (71 ft 2 in)
- Height: 5.93 m (19 ft 5 in)
- Wing area: 67.38 m^{2} (725.3 sq ft)
- Gross weight: 21,100 kg (46,518 lb)
- Powerplant: 2 × Rolls-Royce Nene I centrifugal-flow turbojet, 20 kN (4,400 lbf) thrust each
- Powerplant: 1 × Rolls-Royce Derwent V centrifugal-flow turbojet, 16 kN (3,500 lbf) thrust

Performance

- Maximum speed: 872 km/h (542 mph, 471 kn) at 5,000 m (16,000 ft)
- Combat range: 2,810 km (1,750 mi, 1,520 nmi) with normal bomb load
- Service ceiling: 11,500 m (37,700 ft)

Armament

- Guns: 6 x 23 mm (0.91 in) Nudelman-Suranov NS-23 cannon in dorsal, ventral remotely-controlled barbettes with two in fixed forward firing mounts in the lower forward fuselage.
- Bombs: 1,000–1,500 kg (2,200–3,300 lb) of bombs in an internal fuselage bomb bay

== Bibliography ==
- Duffy, Paul & Kandalov, Andrei (1996). Tupolev: The Man and His Aircraft. Warrendale, Pennsylvania: SAE. ISBN 1-56091-899-3.
- Gordon, Yefim & Rigamant, Vladimir (2005). OKB Tupolev: A History of the Design Bureau and its Aircraft. Hinckley, UK: Midland Publishing. ISBN 1-85780-214-4.
- Gunston, Bill (1995). Tupolev Aircraft Since 1922. Annapolis, Maryland: Naval Institute Press. ISBN 1-55750-882-8.
