= Nudelman N-37 =

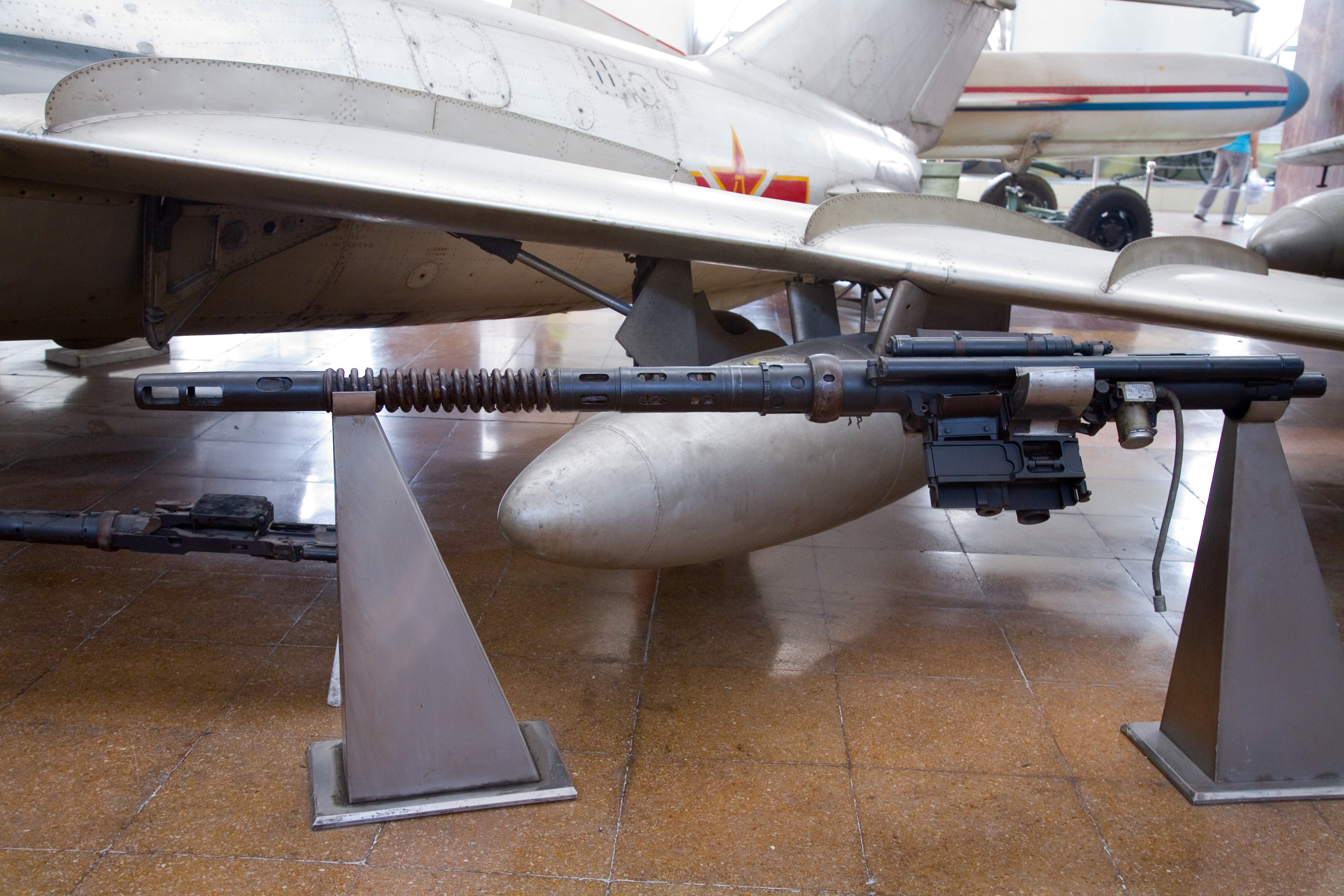
- Chinese N-37 at the Beijing Military Museum
- Type: Single-barrel autocannon
- Place of origin: USSR

Service history
- In service: 1946 -
- Used by: Soviet armed forces and export customers
- Wars: Korean War; Vietnam War; Syrian Civil War; Middle Eastern conflicts

Production history
- Designer: V. Ya. Nemenov
- Designed: 1945
- Manufacturer: OKB-16
- Produced: 1946 – ca.1960
- Variants: N-37; N-37D; N-37L; NN-37

Specifications
- Mass: 103 kg (227 lb)
- Length: 2,455 millimetres (96.7 in) (N-37D)
- Barrel length: 1,361 millimetres (53.6 in)
- Cartridge: 37x155mm
- Cartridge weight: 735 g/26 oz HEI-T, 760 g/27 oz AP-T
- Caliber: 37 mm (1.46 in)
- Barrels: 1
- Action: Short recoil
- Rate of fire: 400 rounds per minute
- Muzzle velocity: 690 m/s (2,260 ft/s)

The Nudelman N-37 was a 37 mm (1.46 in) aircraft autocannon used by the Soviet Union. It was designed during World War II by V. Ya. Nemenov of A.E. Nudelman's OKB-16 to replace the earlier Nudelman-Suranov NS-37 and entered service in 1946. It was 30% lighter than its predecessor at the cost of a 23% lower muzzle velocity.

The N-37 was a sizable weapon firing a massive (735 g/26 oz HEI-T, 760 g/27 oz AP-T) shell. Its muzzle velocity was still considerable, but its rate of fire was only 400 rounds per minute. The weapon's considerable recoil and waste gases were problematic for turbojet fighter aircraft, as was finding space for the gun and a useful amount of ammunition, but a single shell was often sufficient to destroy a bomber.

The N-37 was used in the MiG-9, MiG-15, MiG-17, and early MiG-19 fighters, the Yakovlev Yak-25, and others. Production lasted through the late 1950s, although it remained in service for many years afterwards.

== Variants ==
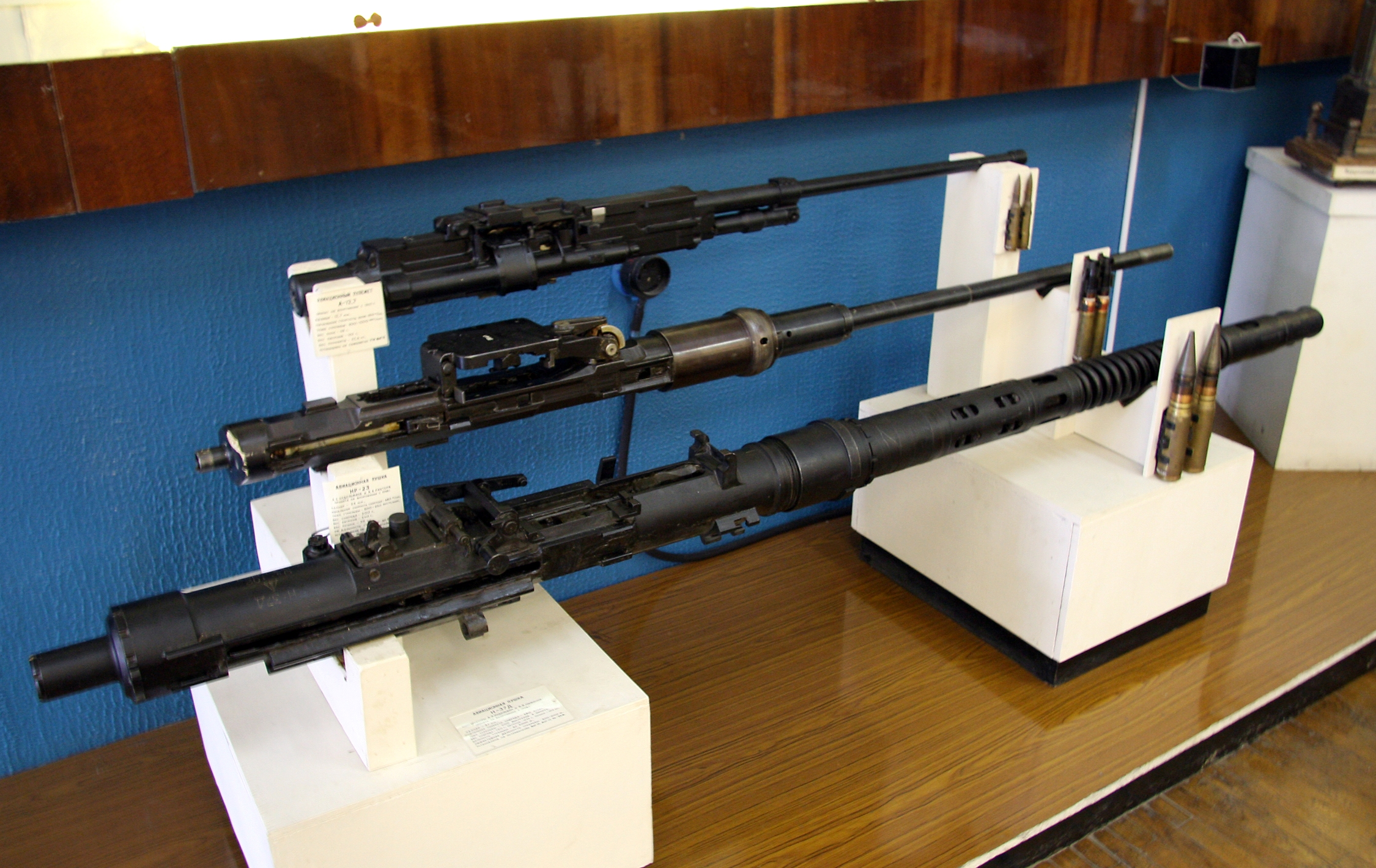
N-37D (front)

N-37
Basic version without muzzle brake

N-37D
N-37 with muzzle brake

N-37L
N-37 with 1950mm long barrel (had no muzzle brake)

NN-37
Improved N-37L developed during the late 1950s for the Yak-27 reconnaissance aircraft. The NN-37 differed from the N-37L in having a pneumatic counter-recoil accelerator, therefore achieving a rate of fire of 600–700rpm. The ammunition feed mechanism was redesigned as well on this version.

Type 37 aircraft cannon
Chinese licensed / copy production

== Production ==
The Soviet archives detail the following production numbers by year:

- 1947 — 518
- 1948 — 508
- 1949 — 1,314
- 1950 — 3,043
- 1951 — 3,885
- 1952 — 4,433
- 1953 — 4,600
- 1954 — 1,700
- 1956 — 285

== Comparable Weapons ==
- M4 cannon

== See also ==
- List of Russian weaponry

== Bibliography ==
- Koll, Christian (2009). Soviet Cannon - A Comprehensive Study of Soviet Arms and Ammunition in Calibres 12.7mm to 57mm. Austria: Koll. p. 341. ISBN 978-3-200-01445-9. Archived from the original on 2009-10-19.
- Широкорад А.Б. (2001) История авиационного вооружения Харвест (Shirokorad A.B. (2001) Istorya aviatsionnogo vooruzhenia Harvest. ISBN 985-433-695-6) (History of aircraft armament)
