= Rolls-Royce 40 mm cannon =

British weapon

Cannon, 40 mm, Rolls-Royce
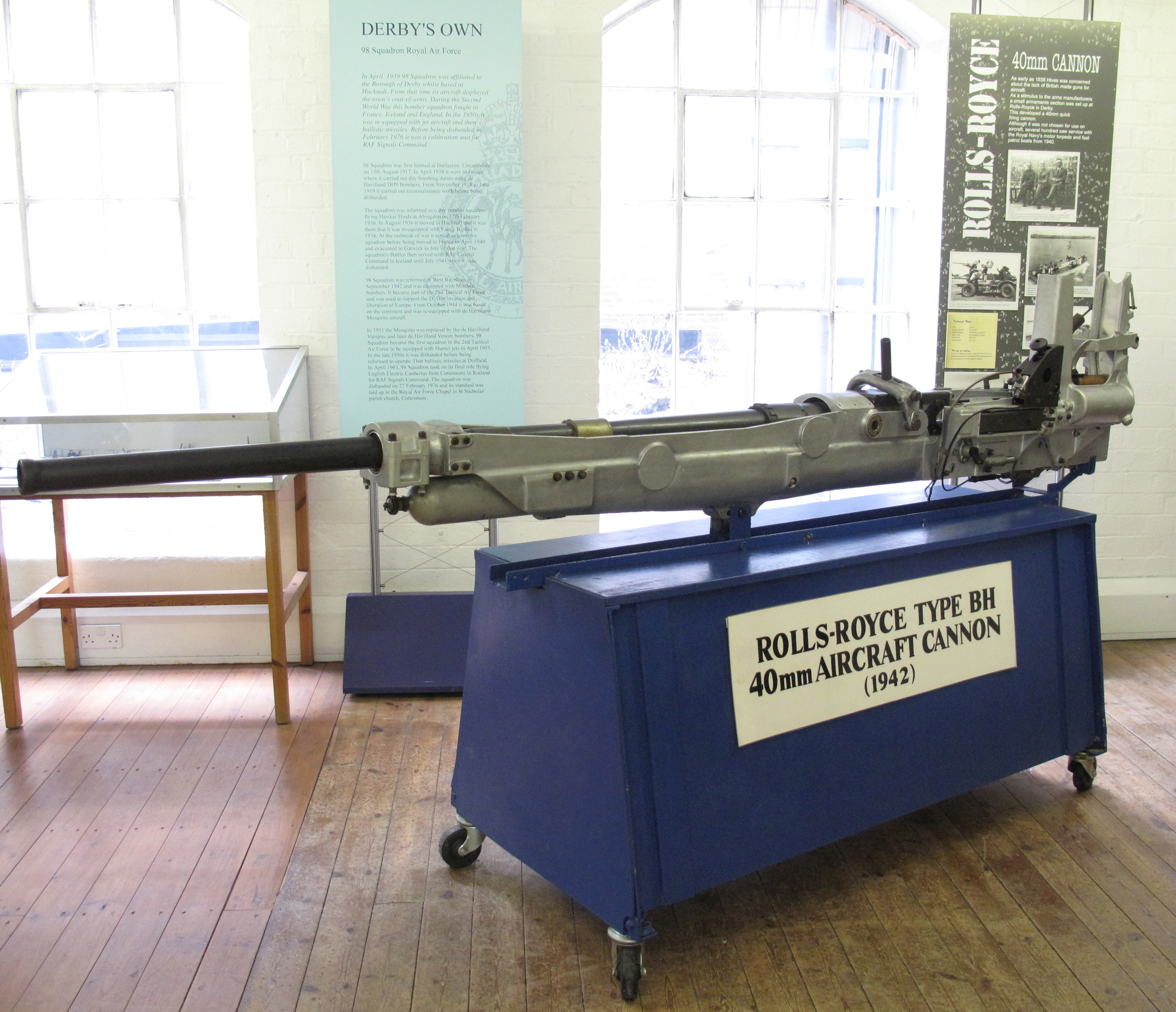
- Rolls-Royce type BH 40mm Aircraft Cannon (1942) on display at the Silk Mill Museum, Derby, in 2010.
- Type: autocannon
- Place of origin: United Kingdom

Service history
- In service: 1941–1945
- Used by: United Kingdom
- Wars: World War II

Production history
- Designed: 1938–1940
- Produced: 1940–1942

Specifications
- Calibre: 40 mm

The Rolls-Royce 40 mm Cannon was a project first proposed in late 1938 to produce a cannon for mounting in aircraft which could cause sufficient damage to bring down a large bomber. It was envisaged as a suitable weapon for destroying tanks from the air. Experimental versions of the cannon were produced, including some with a magazine or belt feed for the ammunition. Examples were fitted to a Bristol Beaufighter and Hawker Hurricane for testing, although never used in action. Development of the aircraft cannon to iron out problems came to an end in 1943 when the Air Ministry lost interest in it and had started to favor the RP-3 rocket projectile as its preferred aircraft anti-tank weapon.

The gun was designed by Italian engineer Spirito Mario Viale, Rolls-Royce's chief armaments designer, at Littleover, Derby. The gun was tested on a small testing range at Sinfin near the Derby works without the usual precautions like red flags. Later trials were at an Army range at Manorbier of a gun mounted on a 30 cwt Morris truck (which by a fluke hit a target plane on its fourth shot) and at the Royal Navy's waterborne trials off Whale Island.

Although the Rolls-Royce 40 mm cannon was never deployed in aircraft, with the Fall of France in 1940 the Royal Navy found itself lacking armament in its coastal craft to respond to German E-boats. The Admiralty became interested in the development of the 40 mm cannon as a weapon that could knock out an E-boat. The first sea trials of the cannon were undertaken in September 1940 and it entered service in 1941 after teething troubles were ironed out. The "Rolls gun" was deployed mainly on motor gun boats which were used in action in British waters and the Mediterranean, where they were much used in the anti-aircraft role. Over 600 40 mm cannon were manufactured under sub-contract by British United Shoe Machinery (BUSM) in Leicester, since Rolls-Royce was forbidden by Lord Beaverbrook, the Minister of Aircraft Production, to tie up resources on them.

== See also ==
- Rolls-Royce Experimental Machine Gun – another Rolls-Royce aircraft gun design
- Molins Gun - QF 6-Pounder cannon used in de Havilland Mosquito "Tsetse" aircraft and Motor Torpedo Boats
- Vickers S a 40 mm gun used on British aircraft

== Bibliography ==
- Birch, David (2000). Rolls-Royce Armaments. Derby: Rolls-Royce Heritage Trust. ISBN 1-872922-15-5.
- Robotham, William Arthur (1970). Silver Ghosts and Silver Dawn. London: Constable. ISBN 978-0-09-456690-3.
