= Ilyushin Il-8 =

Soviet ground-attack aircraft prototype

- Second prototype of the Il-8

General information
- Type: Ground-attack
- National origin: Soviet Union
- Manufacturer: Voronezh Aircraft Production Association
- Designer: Ilyushin
- Status: Prototype
- Number built: 3

History
- First flight: 10 May 1943
- Developed from: Ilyushin Il-2

The Ilyushin Il-8 was a Soviet ground-attack aircraft developed by Ilyushin to replace the Ilyushin Il-2. The first two prototypes were significantly faster than the older aircraft, but proved to be less maneuverable. It was redesigned, incorporating many features of what would become the Ilyushin Il-10, but proved to be inferior to that aircraft in testing. It was not ordered into production.

== Development ==
In summer 1942 Sergey Ilyushin was requested to design a heavy attack aircraft with a bombload of up to 1,000 kg (2,200 lb). He chose to scale up the single-engined Il-2 to use the new and more powerful Mikulin AM-42 engine, which was essentially a scaled-up version of the Il-2's Mikulin AM-38 engine. The design was initially designated the Il-AM-42, but it was soon allocated the factory designation Il-8. While the design of the Il-8 was based on that of the Il-2, it was a completely new aircraft.

The oil cooler was housed with the coolant radiator in a big airscoop on top of the engine cowling, closer to the cockpit than was the case on the Il-2. The gunner's position was enclosed in the armored shell, unlike that in the Il-2, and was equipped with a 12.7 mm (0.50 in) Berezin UBK machine gun on a VU-8 flexible mount. Otherwise the gun armament was identical to the older aircraft with a pair of 23 mm (0.91 in) VYa cannon with a total 300 rounds and a pair of 7.62 mm (0.300 in) ShKAS machine guns with 1500 rounds in the wings. Optionally two 37 mm (1.5 in) Nudelman-Suranov NS-37s could be installed instead of the VYa-23 cannon. The rear fuselage was lengthened by 1.42 m (4 ft 8 in) to improve airflow and the landing gear was lengthened to accommodate the larger propeller. The landing gear nacelles were modified accordingly.

Two prototypes were built of the Il-8. The first had VYa-23 cannon and a wooden rear fuselage. The second had NS-37 cannon installed and a metal rear fuselage. The first flight was on 10 May 1943 and the prototypes were tested both as attack aircraft and as an artillery spotter variant with less range and better radios. Flight tests were reasonably successful with the Il-8 proving to be almost 50 km/h (31 mph) faster at low altitudes than the Il-2. It climbed 15% faster and had nearly twice the range of the older aircraft. Flight testing was prolonged by problems with the AM-42 engines. They were unreliable, smoky and vibration-prone. But the Il-8 proved to be less maneuverable than the Il-2 in both the horizontal and vertical planes. State acceptance trials lasted from 26 February to 30 March 1944 and it was provisionally accepted for production, provided that these issues were fixed.

However, Ilyushin thought that the best features of the two-seat Il-1 prototype could be incorporated into the Il-8 design and approval for another prototype was granted on 1 July 1944. The new prototype, confusingly referred to in the records with the same Il-8-2 designation used for the second prototype of the original design, greatly resembled what would become the Il-10, except for a longer fuselage and the four-bladed propeller. The armament was changed as Nudelman-Suranov NS-23 cannon replaced the YVa-23 guns and the UBK was upgraded with a 20 mm (0.79 in) Berezin B-20 cannon in a VU-9 mount. A cassette of ten AG-2 aerial grenades was fitted to enhance rear defense. The bombload was upgraded to a total of 1000 kg compared to the 800 kg (1,800 lb) of the first prototypes. The Il-8-2 made its first flight on 13 October 1944 and flight testing was once again delayed with engine problems and state acceptance trials were not completed until 7 July 1945. While it proved to be an improvement over the first design, it was inferior in performance to the Il-10 which was already in service and was not placed into production.

== Il-8 specifications ==
Data from

General characteristics

- Crew: two
- Length: 12.9 m (42 ft 4 in)
- Wingspan: 14.6 m (47 ft 11 in)
- Wing area: 39 m^{2} (420 sq ft)
- Empty weight: 4,910 kg (10,825 lb)
- Gross weight: 7,660 kg (16,887 lb)
- Powerplant: 1 × Mikulin AM-42 liquid-cooled V-12 , 1,492 kW (2,000 hp)

Performance

- Maximum speed: 472 km/h (294 mph, 255 kn)
- Range: 980 km (611 mi, 531 nmi)
- Service ceiling: 6,400 m (21,000 ft)

Armament

- 2 × 23 mm VYa fixed cannon
- 2 × 7.62 mm ShKAS machine gun
- 1 × 12.7 mm flexible UBK
- up to 800 kg (1760 lb) bombs

== See also ==
Related development

- Ilyushin Il-2

Aircraft of comparable role, configuration, and era

- Ilyushin Il-10
- Ilyushin Il-16
- Sukhoi Su-6
