= Yakovlev Yak-3 =

Fighter aircraft

Yak-3
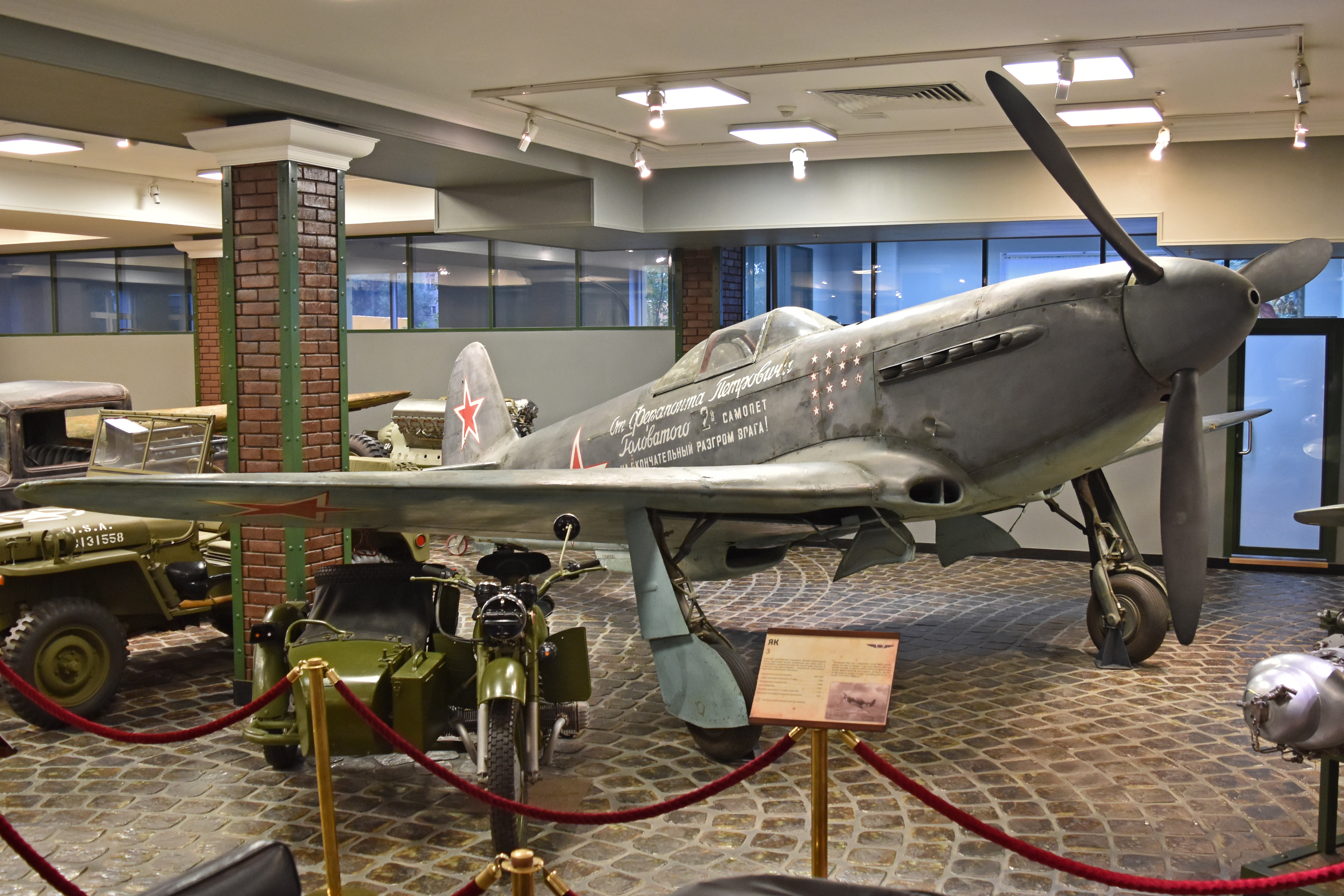
- Yak-3 in the Vadim Zadorozhny Technical Museum, Krasnogorsk, Russia

General information
- Type: Fighter
- National origin: Soviet Union
- Designer: A.S. Yakovlev Design Bureau
- Built by: Plant No.292 (Saratov), Plant No.31 (Tbilisi)
- Primary users: Soviet Air Forces French Air Force (Normandie-Niemen); Polish Air Force; Yugoslav Air Force
- Number built: 4,848

History
- Manufactured: March 1944 – August 1946
- Introduction date: June 1944
- First flight: 28 February 1943 (Yak-1M)
- Retired: 1952 (Soviet Air Forces)
- Developed from: Yakovlev Yak-1
- Developed into: Yakovlev Yak-11; Yakovlev Yak-15

The Yakovlev Yak-3 (Russian: Яковлев Як-3) is a single-engine, single-seat World War II Soviet fighter. Robust and easy to maintain, it was much liked by both pilots and ground crew. One of the smallest and lightest combat fighters fielded by any combatant during the war, its high power-to-weight ratio gave it excellent performance and it proved to be a formidable dogfighter.

== Origins ==
The origins of the Yak-3 went back to 1941 when the I-30 prototype was offered along with the I-26 (Yak-1) as an alternative design. The I-30, powered by a Klimov M-105P engine, was of all-metal construction, using a wing with dihedral on the outer panels. Like the early Yak-1, it had a 20 mm (0.79 in) ShVAK cannon firing through the hollow-driveshaft nose spinner as a motornaya pushka (моторная пушка - Literally: 'Motor Cannon'), twin 7.62 mm (0.300 in) synchronized ShKAS machine guns in cowling mounts and a ShVAK cannon in each wing.

During the Battle of Stalingrad, Luftwaffe fighters exhibited significant speed, climb rate, and armament advantages over those of the VVS. The Yak-1 then in service was understood to be in urgent need of a modernization were it to fight on equal footing against the latest models of German fighters, as well as better energy retention and higher firepower.

Then, in 1943, a group of designers headed by Alexander Sergeyevich Yakovlev designed the Yak-3, a further development of the proven Yak-1 aimed at improving survivability, flight characteristics and firepower, which required a lower weight, a higher-power engine and therefore, faster speed.

== Design and development ==
The first of two prototypes had a slatted wing to improve handling and short-field performance while the second prototype had a wooden wing without slats in order to simplify production and save aluminium. The second prototype crashed during flight tests and was written off. Although there were plans to put the Yak-3 into production, the scarcity of aviation aluminium and the pressure of the German invasion led to work on the first Yak-3 being abandoned in late 1941.

In between 1942 and 1943, Yakovlev built the Yak-1M, a prototype that would ultimately lead to the Yak-3, coupled with the VK-105PF2, the latest iteration of the VK-105 engine family, where "P" indicated support for a motornaya pushka - an autocannon that fires between the engine banks, through the hollow propeller shaft - mounting. It incorporated a wing of similar design but with smaller surface area (17.15 to 14.85 m^{2} (184.6 to 159.8 ft^{2})), and had further aerodynamic refinements, like the new placement of the oil radiator, from the chin to the wing roots (one of the visual differences with the Yak-1, -7, -9). A second Yak-1M (originally meant as a "backup") prototype was constructed later that year, differing from the first aircraft in that it had plywood instead of fabric covering of the rear fuselage, mastless radio antenna, reflector gunsight and improved armour and engine cooling.

After the VK-105PF2 engine received a boost from a manifold pressure of 1050 mmHg to 1100 mmHg, additional tests were needed to determine how it impacted the flight characteristics of the Yak-3. State trials revealed that this boost reduced the time needed to reach 5,000 m (16,000 ft) by 0.1 seconds, the takeoff run by 15 m (49 ft), altitude gain in a combat loop by 50 m (160 ft), and speed below 2,400 m (7,900 ft) by 5–6 km/h (3–4 mph).

The chief test pilot for the project Petr Mikhailovich Stefanovskiy was so impressed with the new aircraft that he recommended that it should completely replace the Yak-1 and Yak-7 with only the Yak-9 retained in production for further work with the Klimov VK-107 engine. The new fighter, designated the Yak-3, entered service in 1944, later than the Yak-9 despite the lower designation number, and by mid-1946 4,848 had been built.

The designation Yak-3 was also used for other Yakovlev projects – a proposed but never built, heavy twin-engine fighter and the Yakovlev Yak-7A.

The first 197 Yak-3 were lightly armed with a single motornaya pushka-mount 20 mm (0.79 in) ShVAK cannon and one 12.7 mm (0.50 in) UBS synchronized machine gun, with subsequent aircraft receiving a second UBS for a weight of fire of 2.72 kg (6.0 lb) per second using high-explosive ammunition. All armament was installed close to the axis of the aircraft with a cannon mounted in the engine "vee" firing through the propeller boss, synchronised machine guns in the fuselage, helping accuracy and leaving wings unloaded.

== Operational history ==
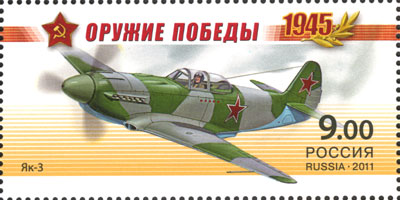
Yak-3, featured on 2011 postage stamp of Russia, Weapons of Victory stamp series

Lighter and smaller than the Yak-9 but powered by the same engine, the Yak-3 was a forgiving and easy to handle aircraft making it a successful dog-fighter. It was used mostly as a tactical fighter, flying low over battlefields and engaging in dogfights below 4,000 m (13,000 ft).

The new aircraft began to reach frontline units during summer 1944. Yak-3 service tests were conducted by 91st IAP of the 2nd Air Army, commanded by Lt Colonel Kovalyov, in June–July 1944. The regiment had the task of gaining air superiority. During 431 sorties, 20 Luftwaffe fighters and three Junkers Ju 87s were shot down while Soviet losses amounted to two Yak-3s shot down. A large dogfight developed on 16 June 1944, when 18 Yak-3s clashed with 24 German aircraft. Soviet Yak-3 fighters shot down 15 German aircraft for the loss of one Yak destroyed and one damaged. The following day, Luftwaffe activity over that section of the front had virtually ceased. On 17 July 1944, eight Yaks attacked a formation of 60 German aircraft, including escorting fighters. In the ensuing dogfight, the Luftwaffe lost three Ju 87s and four Bf 109Gs, for no loss. The Luftwaffe issued an order to "avoid combat below five thousand metres with Yakovlev fighters lacking an oil cooler intake beneath the nose!" Luftwaffe fighters in combat with the Yak-3 tried to use surprise tactics, attacking from above.

Unresolved wartime problems with the Yak-3 included plywood surfaces delaminating when the aircraft pulled out of a high-speed dive, short range and poor engine reliability. The pneumatic system for actuating landing gear, flaps and brakes, typical for all Yakovlev fighters of the time, was troublesome. Though less reliable than hydraulic or electrical alternatives, the pneumatic system was preferred owing to the weight saving.

In 1944, the Normandie-Niemen Regiment re-equipped with the Yak-3, scoring the last 99 of their 273 air victories against the Luftwaffe.

Total Yak-3 losses in combat were 210, 60 in 1944 and 150 in 1945.

Marcel Albert, a World War II French ace who flew the Yak-3 in the USSR with the Normandie-Niémen Group, considered it a superior aircraft to the P-51D Mustang and Supermarine Spitfire.

It was also flown by Polish Air Forces (of the Polish People's Army formed in USSR) and the Yugoslav Air Force, after the war.

== Variants ==
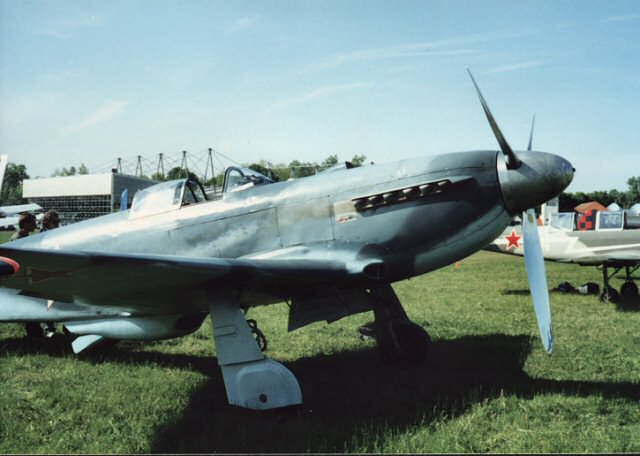
Yakovlev Yak-3 (replica), with opposite rotation propeller

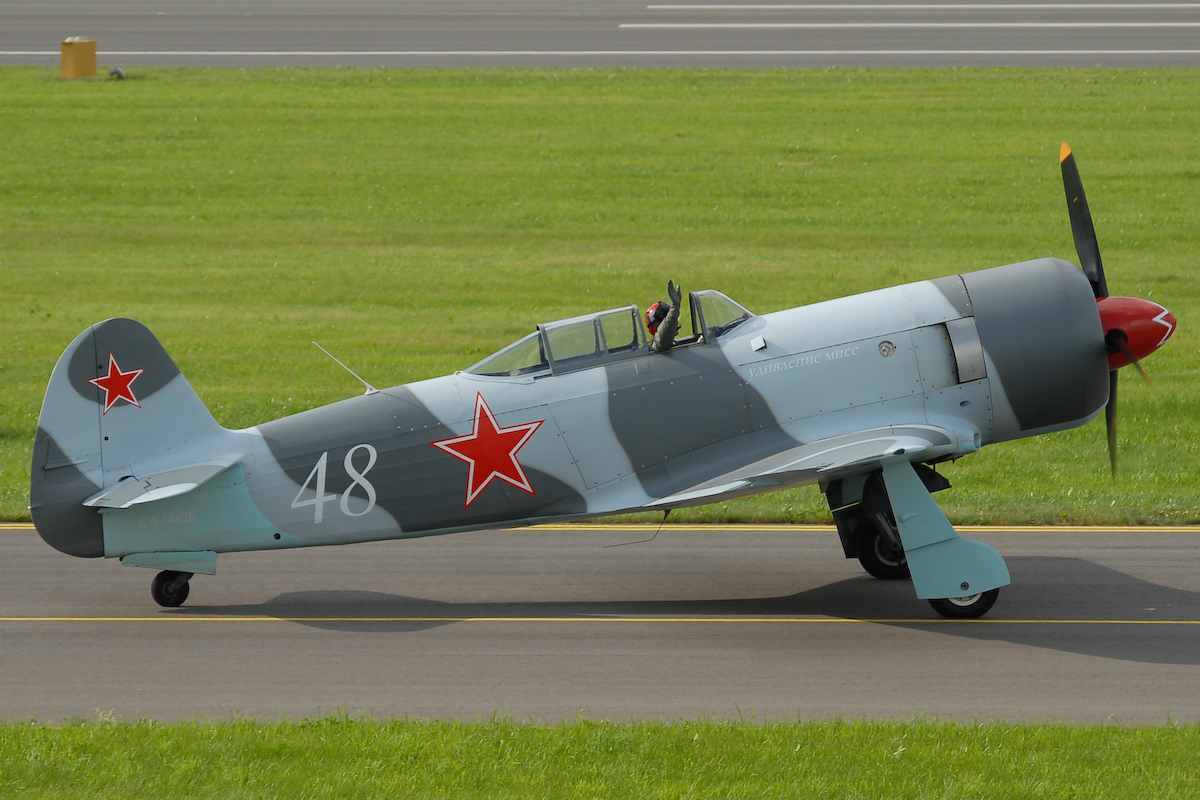
Yakovlev Yak-3UPW produced in 2002 with Pratt & Whitney R-1830 radial engine

Yak-3
main production version
Yak-3 (VK-107A)
Klimov VK-107A engine with 1,230 kW (1,649 hp) and 2 × 20 mm (0.79 in) Berezin B-20 cannons with 120 rpg. After several mixed-construction prototypes, 48 all-metal production aircraft were built in 1945–1946 during and after WW2. Despite excellent performance (720 km/h (450 mph) at 5,750 m (18,860 ft)), it saw only limited squadron service with the 897th IAP. Though the problems with the VK-107 overheating were eventually mitigated, it was decided to leave the engine for the better-suited Yak-9.
Yak-3 (VK-108)
Yak-3 (VK-107A) modified with VK-108 engine with 1,380 kW (1,851 hp), and armed a single 23 mm (0.91 in) Nudelman-Suranov NS-23 cannon with 60 rounds of ammunition. The aircraft reached 745 km/h (463 mph) at 6,290 m (20,636 ft) in testing but suffered from significant engine overheating. Another Yak-3 with 2 × 20 mm (0.79 in) Berezin B-20 cannons was also fitted with the engine with similar results.
Yak-3K
Armed with a 45 mm (1.8 in) Nudelman-Suranov NS-45 cannon, only a few built because Yak-9K was a better match for the weapon
Yak-3P
Production started after war armed with 3 × 20 mm (0.79 in) Berezin B-20 cannon with 120 rounds for the middle cannon and 130 rpg for the side weapons. A total of 596 being built, none of them took part in combat. The three-cannon armament with full ammunition load was actually 11 kg (24 lb) lighter than that of a standard Yak-3, and the one-second burst mass of 3.52 kg (7.8 lb).
Yak-3PD
high-altitude interceptor with Klimov VK-105PD engine and a single 23 mm (0.91 in) Nudelman-Suranov NS-23 cannon with 60 rounds of ammunition, reached 13,300 m (43,635 ft) in testing but did not enter production due to unreliability of the engine.
Yak-3RD (Yak-3D)
experimental aircraft with an auxiliary Glushko RD-1 liquid-fuel rocket engine with 2.9 kN (650 lbf) of thrust in the modified tail, armed with a single 23 mm (0.91 in) Nudelman-Suranov NS-23 cannon with 60 rounds of ammunition. On 11 May 1945, the aircraft reached 782 km/h (486 mph) at 7,800 m (25,600 ft). During the 16 August test flight, the aircraft crashed for unknown reasons, killing the test pilot V.L. Rastorguev. Like all mixed powerplant aircraft of the time, the project was abandoned in favor of turbojet engines.
Yak-3T
tank destroyer version armed with 1 × 37 mm (1.5 in) Nudelman N-37 cannon with 25 rounds and 2 × 20 mm (0.79 in) Berezin B-20S cannons with 100 rpg. Cockpit was moved 0.4 m (16 in) back to compensate for the heavier nose. Engine modifications required to accept the weapons resulted in serious overheating problems which were never fixed and the aircraft did not advance beyond the prototype stage.
Yak-3T-57
single Yak-3T with a 57 mm (2.2 in) OKB-16-57 cannon
Yak-3TK
powered by a VK-107A engine, and fitted with an exhaust turbocharger.
Yak-3U
Yak-3 fitted with Shvetsov ASh-82FN radial engine with 1,380 kW (1,851 hp) in an attempt to increase performance while avoiding the overheating problems of VK-107 and VK-108. Wingspan increased by 20 cm (7.9 in), wings moved 22 cm (8.7 in) forward, cockpit raised by 8 cm (3.1 in). Armament of 2 × 20 mm (0.79 in) Berezin B-20 cannons with 120 rpg. The prototype reached 682 km/h (424 mph) at 6,000 m (20,000 ft) and while successful did not enter production because it was completed after the war.
Yak-3UTI
two-seat conversion trainer based on Yak-3U powered by Shvetsov ASh-21 radial piston engine. The aircraft became the prototype for the Yak-11.

== Operators ==
France
Normandie-Niemen squadron
Poland
Air Force of the Polish Army
Soviet Union
Soviet Air Force
Yugoslavia
SFR Yugoslav Air Force

- 111th Fighter Aviation Regiment (1944–48)
- 113th Fighter Aviation Regiment (1945–48)
- 112th Fighter Aviation Regiment (1945–48)
- 254th Fighter Aviation Regiment (1944–48)
- 83rd Fighter Aviation Regiment (1948–52)
- 116th Fighter Aviation Regiment (1948–52)
- 185th Mixed Aviation Regiment (1949–52)
- 198th Fighter Aviation Regiment (1949–52)
- 204th Fighter Aviation Regiment (1949–50)

== Reproductions ==
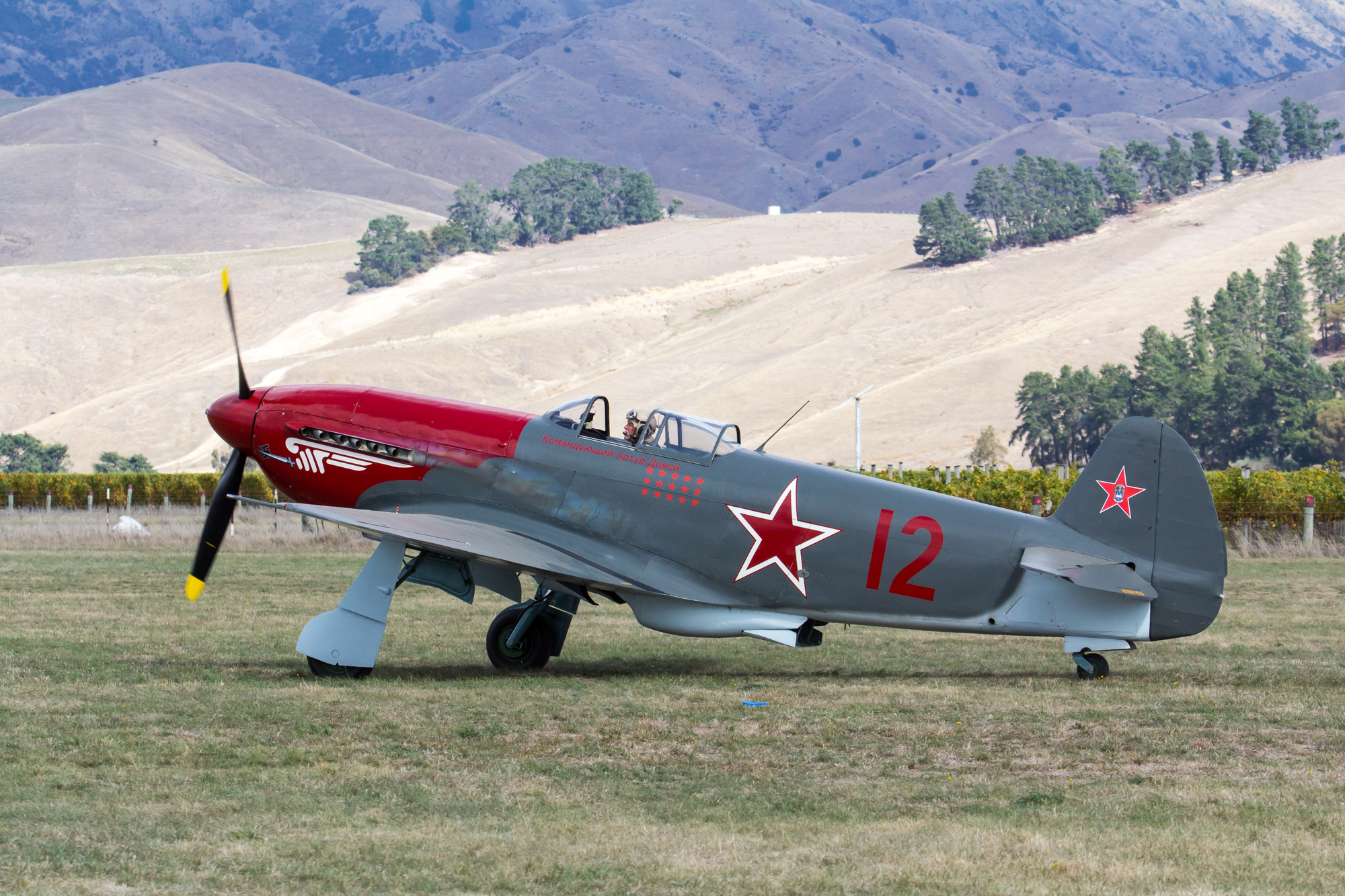
Yakovlev Yak-3M ZK-YYY, at the Classic Fighters 2015 airshow, Blenheim, New Zealand.

From 1991 to 2002 there were 21 Yakovlev Yak-3, Yak-7 and Yak-9 aircraft produced in the former Soviet Union using the original plans and dies. These aircraft are powered by the American Allison V-1710 or the Pratt & Whitney R-1830 Twin Wasp engine in place of the Klimov V-12s used during the war. Several of these aircraft are airworthy, mostly based in the United States with others in Germany, Australia and New Zealand. Others have been converted to "Yak-3U" status from original Yak-11 trainers for private owners and museums.

Flying a modified modern production Yak-3UPW powered by a Pratt & Whitney R-2000 engine, William Whiteside set an official international speed record for piston-engined aircraft in the under-3,000 kg (6,600 lb) category on 10 October 2011, reaching 655 km/h (407 mph) over a 3 km (1.864 mi) course at the Bonneville Salt Flats in Utah in the United States, greatly exceeding the previous record of 491 km/h (305 mph) set in 2002 by Jim Wright. The following day, Whiteside used the same aircraft to set another speed record for aircraft in the category of 669 km/h (416 mph) over the same 3-km (1.864-mile) course.

== Specifications (Yak-3) ==
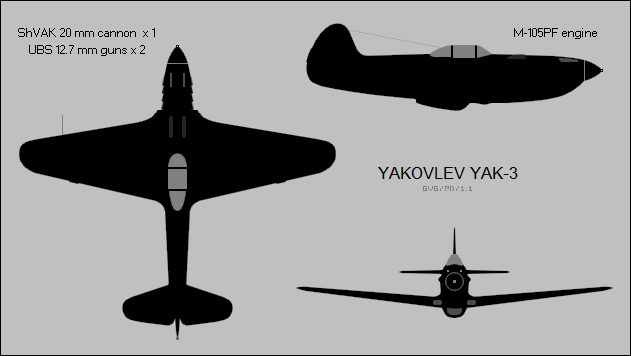
3-view silhouette drawing of the Yakovlev Yak-3

Data from

General characteristics

- Crew: 1
- Length: 8.5 m (27 ft 11 in)
- Wingspan: 9.2 m (30 ft 2 in)
- Wing area: 14.85 m^{2} (159.8 sq ft)
- Airfoil: root: Clark YH (14%); tip: Clark YH (10%)
- Empty weight: 2,105 kg (4,641 lb)
- Max takeoff weight: 2,697 kg (5,946 lb)
- Powerplant: 1 × Klimov VK-105PF2 V-12 liquid-cooled piston engine, 960 kW (1,290 hp)
- Propellers: 3-bladed constant-speed propeller

Performance

- Maximum speed: 646 km/h (401 mph, 349 kn) at 4,100 m (13,500 ft)
- Combat range: 550 km (340 mi, 300 nmi)
- Service ceiling: 10,400 m (34,100 ft)
- Time to altitude: 5,000 m (16,000 ft) in 4 minutes 30 seconds
- Wing loading: 162 kg/m^{2} (33 lb/sq ft)
- Power/mass: 0.35 kW/kg (0.21 hp/lb)
- Take-off run: 345 m (1,132 ft)
- Landing run: 580 m (1,900 ft)
- 360° turn: 17 seconds

Armament

- Guns: ** 1 × 20 mm ShVAK cannon, with 150 rounds
  - 2 × 12.7 mm Berezin UBS machine guns with 170 rpg

== See also ==
Related development

- Yak-1
- Yak-7
- Yak-9
- Yak-11
- Yak-15

Aircraft of comparable role, configuration, and era

- Messerschmitt Bf 109G
- Focke-Wulf Fw 190
- Supermarine Spitfire
- Bell P-63 Kingcobra
- P-51 Mustang

Related lists

- List of aircraft of World War II
- List of fighter aircraft
- List of military aircraft of the Soviet Union and the CIS
