= 23×115mm =

Soviet low-caliber autocannon cartridge

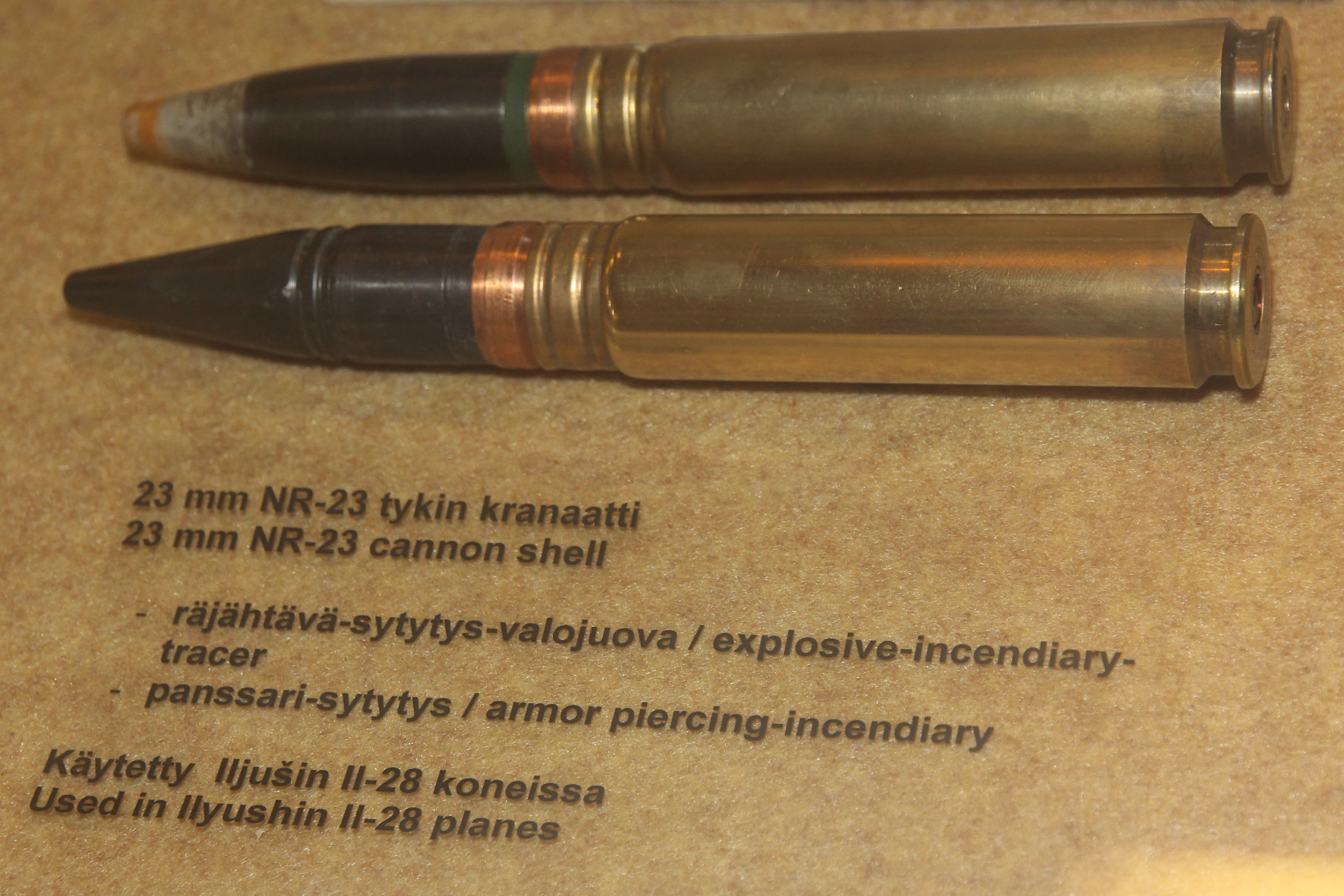
- 23×115mm shells used in NR-23 cannon on the Il-28
- Type: Autocannon, Antiaircraft
- Place of origin: Soviet Union

Service history
- In service: c.1944-present
- Used by: USSR, various former Eastern Bloc countries

Production history
- Designer: OKB-16
- Designed: 1943

Specifications
- Parent case: 14.5×114mm
- Case type: Rimless, bottlenecked
- Bullet diameter: 23 mm (0.91 in)
- Neck diameter: 24 mm (0.94 in)
- Shoulder diameter: 26.26 mm (1.034 in)
- Base diameter: 26.95 mm (1.061 in)
- Rim diameter: 26.95 mm (1.061 in)
- Case length: 115 mm (4.5 in)
- Overall length: 204 mm (8.0 in)
- Maximum pressure: 294.3 MPA

Ballistic performance
Bullet mass/type	Velocity	Energy
175 g (2,701 gr) HEI	740 m/s (2,400 ft/s)	47,900 J (35,300 ft⋅lbf)

The 23×115mm round is used in Soviet (USSR)/Russian/CIS aircraft autocannon. Although superseded by the 30×165mm round the Russian Air Force still uses it in the GSh-23L (in some aircraft's tail turrets and in the UPK-23-250 gun pod) and the GSh-6-23 (in the Su-24). This round still serves in many countries and is widely available. The projectile weight is 175 grams.

== History ==
The round was derived from the 14.5×114mm round by necking it out to 23 mm. The original rounds used a lower power charge of 33 g of sw 4/7 powder and achieved 690 m/s at a maximum pressure of 294.3 MPa. In 1954 an improved ammunition was introduced, featuring better projectile design and ballistic properties. The newer rounds have a powder charge to achieve 720 m/s.

== Weapon platforms ==
- Nudelman-Suranov NS-23, used in the An-2, Il-10, Il-22, La-9, La-11, La-15, MiG-9, Yak-7, Yak-9U, Yak-15, Yak-17, and Yak-23 fighters; and in the Mi-2US, Mi-2URN, and Mi-2URP helicopters.
- Nudelman-Rikhter NR-23, used in the MiG-15, MiG-17, and La-15 fighters.
- Afanasev Makarov AM-23, used in the Tu-16, Tu-95, Il-54 bombers; and in the An-8, An-12, Il-76 transports.
- Gryazev-Shipunov GSh-23, used in the MiG-21, MiG-23, SOKO J-22 Orao, HAL Tejas, and IAR 93 fighters; in the Tu-22M and Tu-95 bombers; in the Mi-24V, Mi-24VP, Mi-24VM, Mi-24VN, Mi-24VU, Mi-35, Mi-35M, Mi-35O, and W-3WA Sokół helicopters; and in the Il-76 transport; and in UPK-23-250 and SPPU-22 gun pods.
- Gryazev-Shipunov GSh-6-23, used in the Su-15, Su-24, MiG-31, and early versions of the MiG-27 fighters.

=== Small arms ===
- The MCR Horizon's Lord is a Ukrainian anti-materiel and extreme-caliber sniper rifle, which can be chambered in 23x115mm.

== See also ==
- 23×152mm, one variant used in the VYa-23 on the Ilyushin Il-2 ground attack aircraft, and a different variant in the later Soviet anti-aircraft autocannon series (ZSU-23-4, ZU-23, etc.)
