= Ilyushin Il-16 =

Soviet ground-attack aircraft prototype

Il-16
- Front view of the Il-16

General information
- Type: Ground-attack aircraft
- National origin: Soviet Union
- Manufacturer: Ilyushin
- Status: Prototype
- Number built: 3?

History
- First flight: 1945
- Developed from: Ilyushin Il-10

The Ilyushin Il-16 (Cyrillic Илью́шин Ил-16) was a Soviet lightweight armored ground-attack aircraft developed at the end of World War II by the Ilyushin Design Bureau. It was in essence a scaled-down version of the Ilyushin Il-10, but was fitted with a newly developed Mikulin AM-43 engine with the expectation that it would be faster and more maneuverable than its predecessor. However, the engine's defects proved to be impossible to rectify and further development were canceled in mid-1946.

== Development ==
The relatively high performance of the Il-10 prompted the development by the Ilyushin design bureau in 1944 of a lighter attack aircraft with greater speed and maneuverability using a more-powerful engine. The Il-16, as the new design was called, was powered by the new liquid-cooled Mikulin AM-43NV engine that delivered 2,300 horsepower (1,700 kW) for takeoff. The design of the Il-16 was virtually identical to that of the Il-10, both aerodynamically and structurally, but it was slightly smaller and weighed less. Coupled with the more powerful AM-43 engine, it was expected that Il-16 would be significantly faster than the older aircraft. It used Ilyushin's typical load-bearing armored shell, but the armor was thinner in some places than that of the Il-10.

The Il-16 shared the same wing-mounted pair of 23 mm (0.91 in) Nudelman-Suranov NS-23 as the Il-10 and added a pair of 7.62 mm (0.3 in) ShKAS machine guns in the outer wing panels. The rear gunner was given a 20 mm (0.8 in) Berezin UB-20. A cassette of ten AG-2 aerial grenades was added to deter pursuing fighters. The bombload was originally intended to be 200 kg (440 lb), carried in two bomb bays in the inner wings or on underwing racks, with a 400 kg (880 lb) overload capacity, but the normal bombload was increased to 400 kg and the overload to 500 kg (1,100 lb).

The exact number of prototypes built is not clear, some sources say three, but at least two appear to have been built, based on photographic evidence. The prototype was first flown in 1945 and the engine's torque, coupled with the short rear fuselage, resulted in poor longitudinal stability characteristics. To correct the problem the second prototype had the rear fuselage lengthened 500 mm (20 in), the area of the vertical tail was increased and the rudder was given a trim tab. These changes were successful in improving the aircraft's flight characteristics, but the engine proved troublesome and prolonged flight testing into 1946. Its problems proved intractable and the program was canceled in the summer of 1946.

== Specifications ==
Data from OKB Ilyushin: A History of the Design Bureau and its Aircraft; The History of Soviet Aircraft from 1918

General characteristics

- Crew: 2
- Length: 11.2 m (36 ft 9 in)
- Wingspan: 13.4 m (44 ft 0 in)
- Wing area: 30 m^{2} (320 sq ft)
- Empty weight: 4,135 kg (9,116 lb)
- Gross weight: 5,780 kg (12,743 lb)
- Max takeoff weight: 5,980 kg (13,184 lb)
- Powerplant: 1 × Mikulin AM-43NV V-12 liquid-cooled piston engine, 1,691 kW (2,268 hp) for take-off
- Propellers: 4-bladed constant-speed propeller

Performance

- Maximum speed: 576 km/h (358 mph, 311 kn)
- Range: 800 km (500 mi, 430 nmi)

Armament

- 2 × wing-mounted 23 mm Nudelman-Suranov NS-23, 280 rounds per gun (rpg)
- 2 × wing-mounted 7.62 mm ShKAS machine guns, 1,400 rpg
- 1 × rear-mounted 20 mm Berezin UB-20 cannon, 150 rounds
- Up to 500 kg (1,102 lb) of various weapons

== See also ==
Related development

- Ilyushin Il-10

Aircraft of comparable role, configuration, and era

- Henschel Hs 129
- Ilyushin Il-2
- Ilyushin Il-8
