= Ilyushin Il-10 =

Soviet ground attack aircraft

Il-10
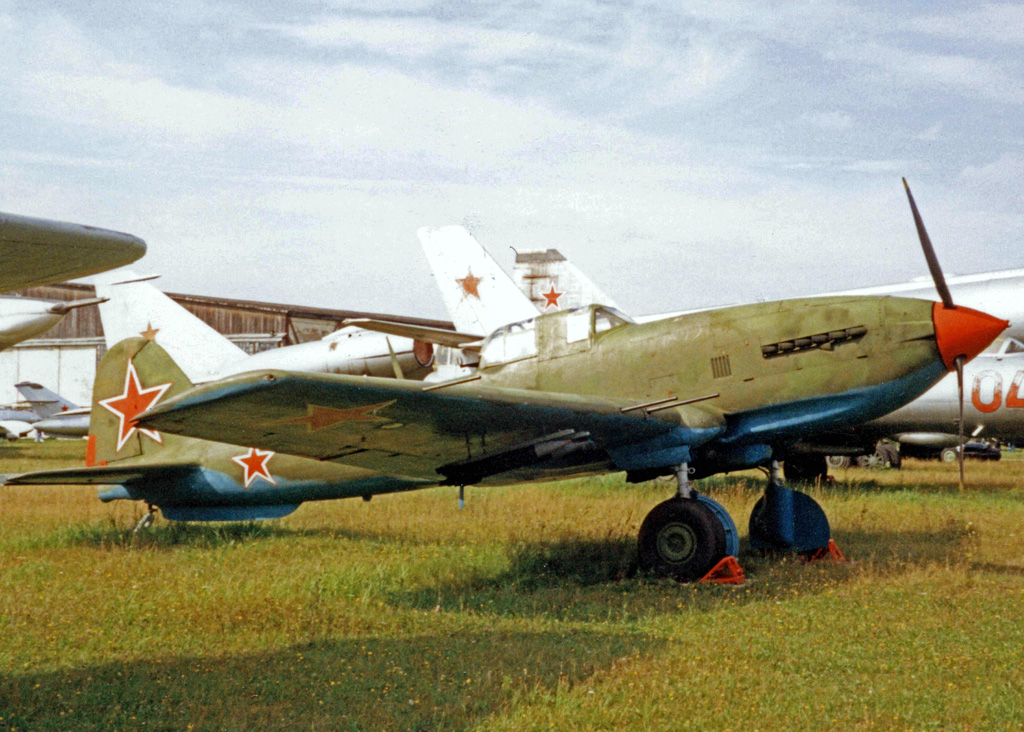
- Ilyushin Il-10M in Soviet Air Force markings preserved at the Monino museum near Moscow

General information
- Type: Ground attack aircraft
- Manufacturer: Ilyushin, Avia
- Primary users: Soviet Air Force Czechoslovak Air Force; Polish Air Force
- Number built: 6,166 (4,966 Il-10 + 1,200 B-33)

History
- Manufactured: 1944–1954
- Introduction date: 1944
- First flight: 18 April 1944
- Retired: 1972 (People's Republic of China)
- Developed from: Ilyushin Il-2
- Developed into: Ilyushin Il-16

The Ilyushin Il-10 (Cyrillic Илью́шин Ил-10, NATO reporting name: "Beast") is a Soviet ground attack aircraft developed at the end of World War II by the Ilyushin construction bureau. It was also license-built in Czechoslovakia by Avia as the Avia B-33.

== Development ==
From the start of Eastern Front combat in World War II, the Soviet Air Force (VVS) used the successful ground attack aircraft Ilyushin Il-2 Sturmovik, powered by the Mikulin AM-38 inline engine. As the war progressed, the Soviets laid plans for that aircraft's successor. The main goal was to increase speed and maneuverability at low altitudes, mainly to evade small-caliber anti-aircraft artillery, which was the main threat for ground attack aircraft, and to remove some of the Il-2's faults. The most promising project was a modern, light and maneuverable close assault aircraft, the Sukhoi Su-6, developed by Pavel Sukhoi's bureau from 1942. At the same time, Sergei Ilyushin developed a heavier aircraft, the BSh M-71, (Il-8 M-71), derived from the Il-2 design, on which it was partly based, to be powered by the prototype Tumansky M-71 radial engine, which did not enter production.

In 1943, Ilyushin started work on a new aircraft, Il-1, which was to be a 1- or 2-seat heavily armoured fighter-interceptor, meant mainly for fighting enemy bombers and transports. The Il-1 was similar to the Il-2 design, but was more modern, compact, and powered with a new Mikulin engine: the AM-42. But the VVS gave up the idea of heavy armoured fighters, due to their low speed, which was not enough to intercept modern bombers. As a result, Ilyushin decided to turn the Il-1 into a two-seat ground attack plane, with the designation changed to Il-10 in early 1944 (odd numbers were reserved for fighters).

At that time, Ilyushin also finished a prototype of a heavier ground attack plane, the Il-8, using the same engine, and more closely derived from the Il-2. It carried a higher payload (1,000 kg or 2,200 lb), but had lower performance than the Il-10. Both types first flew in April 1944, the Il-10 proving greatly superior to the Il-8, which had poor handling. The Il-10 successfully passed trials in early June 1944.

The third competitor was a new variant of the Sukhoi Su-6, also powered by the AM-42 engine. After comparative tests, the Il-10 was considered the winner and was chosen as the new ground attack plane, despite some opinions that the Su-6 was a better aircraft, notwithstanding inferior performance and payload, with better gun armament. Notably, the Su-6 prototype was tested with maximum payload, causing lowered performance, while the Il-10 was tested with normal payload. Some advantages of the Il-10 came from its technical similarity to the Il-2.

=== Production ===
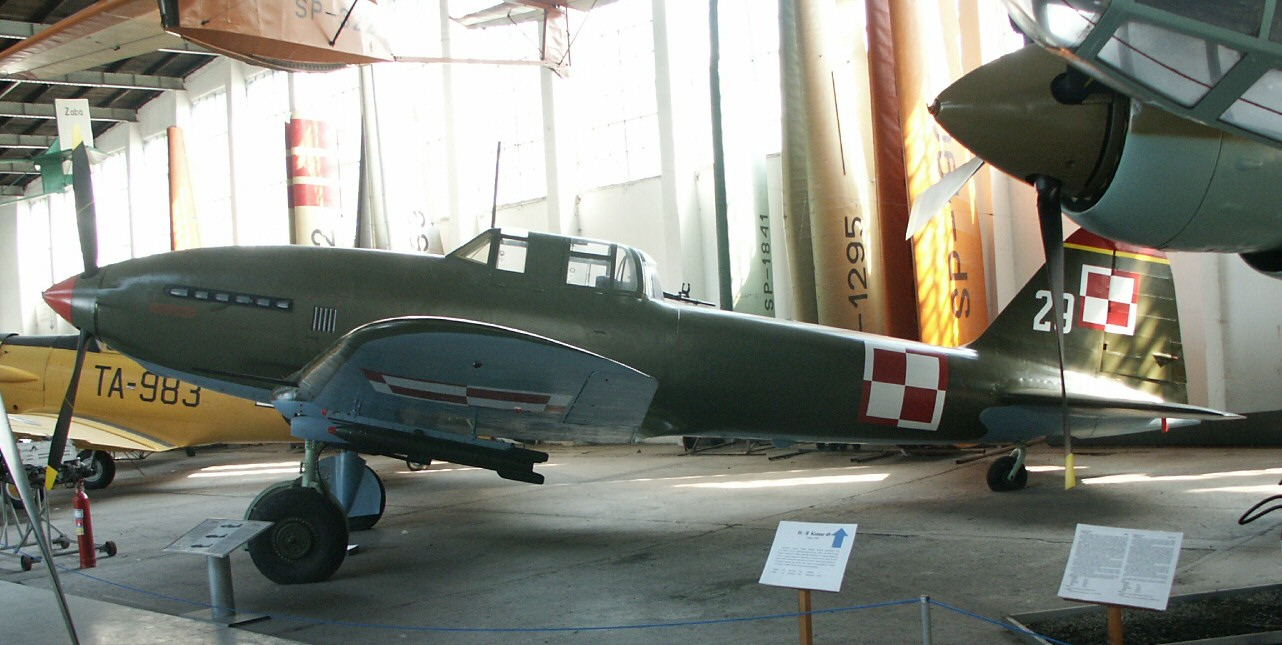
Avia B-33 in the Polish Aviation Museum

On 23 August 1944 the Il-10 was ordered into serial production by decision of the State Defense Committee (GKO) as a new ground attack plane. Its armament was initially similar to late model Il-2s, with two 23 mm (0.91 in) VYa-23 cannons and two ShKAS machine guns in the wings, and a 12.7 mm (0.50 in) UBT machine gun for a rear gunner, and 400 kg (880 lb), or a maximum 600 kg (1,300 lb) of bombs. Unlike the Il-2 and Su-6, it was not initially meant to carry rockets.

Production of the Il-10 started in Kuybyshev's factories No. 1 and No. 18. The first production aircraft flew on 27 September 1944 and 99 aircraft were produced by the end of 1944. Early series aircraft showed teething problems, most notably engine faults and fires. Most problems were eliminated by 1945. Aircraft produced from April 1945 onwards could carry four unguided air-to-ground rockets. Aircraft produced from 1947 onwards were fitted with stronger armament, consisting of four 23 mm NS-23 cannons in the wings and a 20 mm cannon for the rear gunner. Il-10 production ended in 1949, after a run of 4,600 aircraft; in the last two years, they were produced in factory No. 64.

Between 1945 and 1947, 280 UIl-2 or Il-10U trainer variants were produced. The rear gunner' cockpit was replaced with a longer instructor's cockpit with dual controls. Its performance and construction were similar to the combat variant apart from armament, which was reduced to two cannons, two rockets, and a standard load of bombs.

In 1951, the Czechoslovak firm Avia secured a license to make Il-10s, with the designation B-33. The first one flew on 26 December 1951. Initially, their engines were Soviet-built. From 1952 onwards the engines were also produced in Czechoslovakia as the M-42. Besides the combat variant, a Czechoslovak trainer variant also entered service under the designation CB-33. In total, 1,200 B-33s were built by 1956.

In 1951, due to experience acquired during the Korean War, the Soviet Air Force decided that propeller ground attack aircraft might still be useful, and decided to renew Il-10 production in a modified variant, the Il-10M, which first flew on 2 July 1951. It was slightly longer, with a wider wingspan, and larger control surfaces, with a fin under the tail. Four of the more recently developed NR-23 cannons were mounted in the wings, while the payload stayed the same, and newer navigation equipment was installed, giving partial all-weather capability. Speed decreased slightly, but handling improved. Between 1953 and 1954, 146 Il-10Ms were made, all but 10 in Rostov-on-Don's factory No.168.

In total, 6,166 of all Il-10 variants were made, including those built under license.

Trials of Il-10s mounted with more powerful AM-43 and AM-45 engines took place, but proved unsuccessful. Ilyushin next designed a lighter close support aircraft, the Il-16, with improved performance and similar armament. It first flew on 10 June 1945. A short run entered production, but the project was cancelled in 1946 due to the AM-43 engine's unreliability.

== Design ==
=== Technical description ===
The airframe was a one engine two-seat monoplane, with a metal-covered frame. It was highly armoured. The front part of the fuselage, with the cockpit, was a shell of armour plates 4 to 8 mm (0.16 to 0.31 in) thick; the thickest, 8 mm, were under the engine, there was no armour above the engine. The front windshield was made of armour glass 64 mm (2.5 in) thick. Also armoured were: the roof above the pilot, side window frames in the pilot's cab, the wall between crew seats, and the rear wall behind the cab. Total armour weight was 994 kg (2,191 lb), including its attachment. The wing consisted of a central section, with two bomb bays, and two detachable outer panels. The undercarriage was retractable. The main wheels folded to the rear after rotating by 86°.

Early Il-10s had two 23 mm VYa-23 autocannons (150 rounds each) and two 7.62 mm ShKAS machine guns (750 rounds each) fixed in the wings, and a 12.7 mm UBT machine gun in a rear gunner station BU-8, with 150 rounds. The horizontal angle of the rear machine gun field of fire was 100°. From 1947, the aircraft were armed with four NS-23 23 mm cannons in the wings (150 rounds each) and 20 mm B-20T cannon in a rear gunner station BU-9 (150 rounds). The IL-10M had four 23 mm NR-23 cannons in wings (150 rounds each) and 20 mm B-20EN cannon in a rear gunner station BU-9M (150 rounds). Avia B-33 had four 23 mm NS-23RM cannons in wings and 20 mm B-20ET cannon in a rear gunner station BU-9M.

The normal bomb load was 400 kg (880 lb), maximum load was 600 kg (1,300 lb). This could be small fragmentation or anti-tank bomblets, put in bomb bays, or four 50 to 100 kg (110 to 220 lb) bombs in bomb bays and externally under wings, or two 200 to 250 kg (440 to 550 lb) bombs attached under wings. Small bomblets were put directly on bomb bay floors, in piles. A typical load was 182 (maximum 200) 2 kg (4.4 lb) AO-2,5-2 fragmentation bombs, or 144 PTAB-2,5-1,5 anti-tank HEAT bombs. Apart from bombs, four unguided rockets RS-82 or RS-132 could be carried on rail launchers under wings. Avia B-33s were also fitted to carry other rocket types. Late Soviet aircraft could carry ORO-82 and ORO-132 tube launchers. In the tail section was a DAG-10 launcher with 10 anti-aircraft or anti-personnel grenades AG-2 (after being thrown, they would fall with parachutes and then burst, but were not widely used in practice).

The Il-10 engine was a 12-cylinder inline V engine Mikulin AM-42, liquid-cooled, power: 1,320 kW (1,770 hp) continuous, takeoff power: 1,500 kW (2,000 hp). Three-blade propeller AV-5L-24 of 3.6 m (12 ft) diameter. Two fuel tanks in the fuselage: upper 440 L (120 US gal) over engine, ahead of the cockpit, and lower tank of 290 L (77 US gal) under the cockpit. The aircraft had a radio set and a camera AFA-1M in a rear section of the fuselage.

== Operational history ==
In October 1944, the Il-10 first entered service with training units in the Soviet Air Force. In January 1945, the first Il-10 combat unit entered service with the 78th Guards Assault Aviation Regiment, but it did not enter action due to unfinished training. However, three other Il-10 units managed to take part in the final combat actions of World War II in Europe. They were the 571st Assault Aviation Regiment (from 15 April 1945), the 108th Guards Assault Aviation Regiment (from 16 April 1945), and the 118th Guards Assault Aviation Regiment (on 8 May 1945). About a dozen aircraft were destroyed by flak or engine breakdowns, but the Il-10 appeared to be a successful design. One was shot down by an Fw 190 fighter, but a crew of the 118th Regiment shot down another Fw 190 and probably damaged another. On 10 May 1945, the day after the official Soviet end of the war, (Victory Day), there were 120 serviceable Il-10s in Soviet Air Force combat units, and 26 disabled ones.

After the USSR entered the war against the Empire of Japan, with the invasion of Manchuria, from 9 August 1945, one Il-10 unit, the 26th Assault Aviation Regiment of the Pacific Navy Aviation, was used in combat in the Korean Peninsula, attacking Japanese ships in Rasin and rail transports.

After the war, until the early 1950s, the Il-10 was a basic Soviet ground attack aircraft. It was withdrawn from frontline service in 1956. At the same time, work on new jet-powered dedicated armoured ground attack planes (like the Il-40) was canceled, and the Soviets turned to multipurpose fighter-bomber aviation. The Il-10 and its licensed variant, the Avia B-33, became a basic ground attack plane of the Warsaw Pact countries. From 1949 to 1959, the Polish Air Force used 120 Il-10s (including 24 UIl-10) and 281 B-33s. In Poland, the B-33 was modified to carry 400 L (110 US gal) fuel tanks under its wings. From 1950 to 1960, Czechoslovakia used 86 Il-10s, including six UIl-10s, and about 600 B-33s. From 1949 to 1956, the Hungarian Air Force used 159 Il-10s and B-33s. From 1950 to 1960, the Romanian Air Force used 14 Il-10s and 156 B-33s. Bulgaria also used these aircraft.

In the late 1940s, 93 Il-10 and UIl-10s were given to North Korea. They were then used in the 57th Assault Aviation Regiment during the early phase of the Korean War. They were initially used with success against the weak anti-aircraft defense of South Korean forces (following the US refusal to supply the south with "heavy weapons"), but then they suffered heavy losses in encounters against the United States Air Force fighters and were bombed on the ground themselves. After several weeks, about 20 remained. In the summer of 1950, North Korea received more aircraft from the USSR. The North Koreans claimed that they sank a warship on 22 August 1950 with Il-10s, but it was never confirmed.

From 1950, Il-10s were used by the People's Republic of China, in two regiments of an assault aviation division. They were used in combat during a conflict with the Nationalist government on Taiwan, over border islands in January 1955. They remained in service until 1972 (replaced by the Nanchang Q-5). From 1957, Yemen used 24 B-33s.

=== Kemlitz incident ===
On 14 April 1951 a flight of Soviet Il-10 aircraft of the 16th Air Army departed Reinsdorf for the bombing and strafing range at Lieberoser Heide. Thirteen aircraft crashed across a wide area in the vicinity of Kemlitz for the loss of 26 aircrew. The cause of the disaster – whether sabotage, a fueling error, or something else – remains publicly unknown. The aircrew are buried at the Soviet Cemetery Potsdam. In April 2011 a memorial stone was erected in the village square at Kemlitz.

== Variants ==
Il-10
Initial production variant
Il-10M
Redesigned production variant
Il-10U
Two-seat operational trainer. Also known as UIl-10.
Avia B-33
Czechoslovakia-built variant of the initial Il-10
Avia BS-33
Czechoslovakia-built two-seat operational trainer
Il-10 (Turboprop)
Chinese prototype Il-10 development retrofitted with turboprop engine. 2 constructed, with 1 crashing during a test flight in 1972, and the other being destroyed in an engine fire during maintenance in 1978. Project received decreased priority as Q-5 project developed, and was later cancelled.

== Operators ==
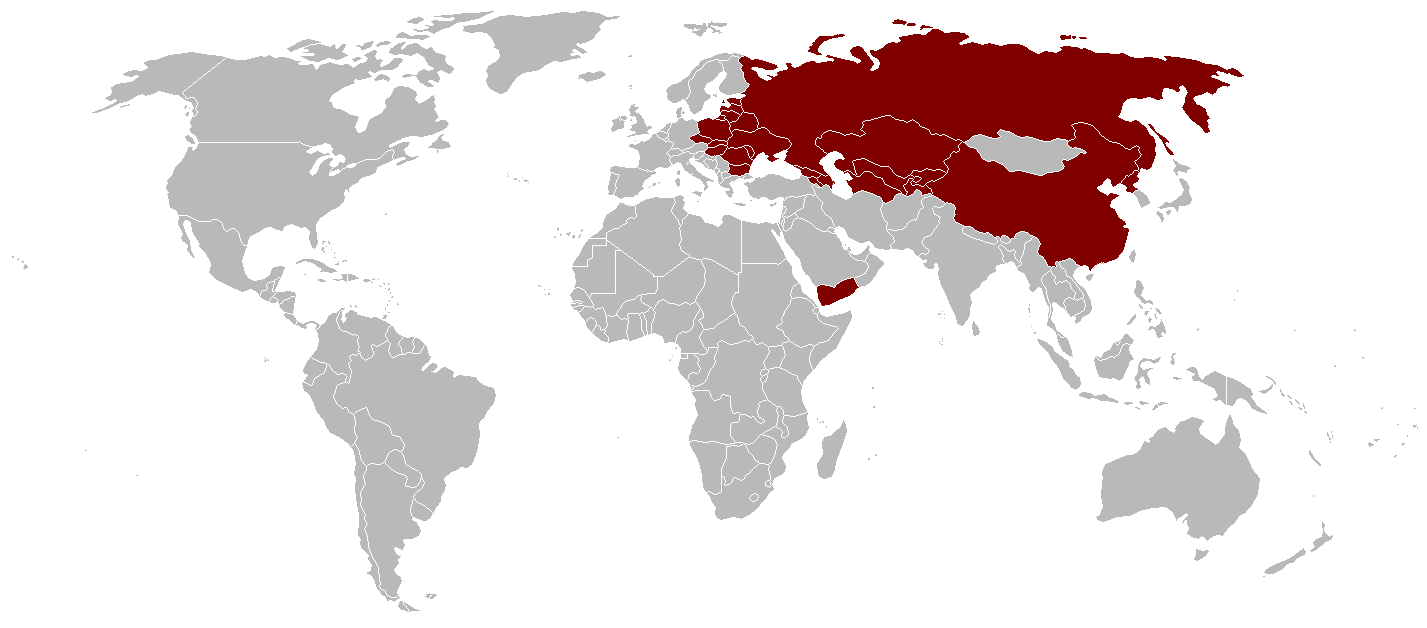
Il-10 operators

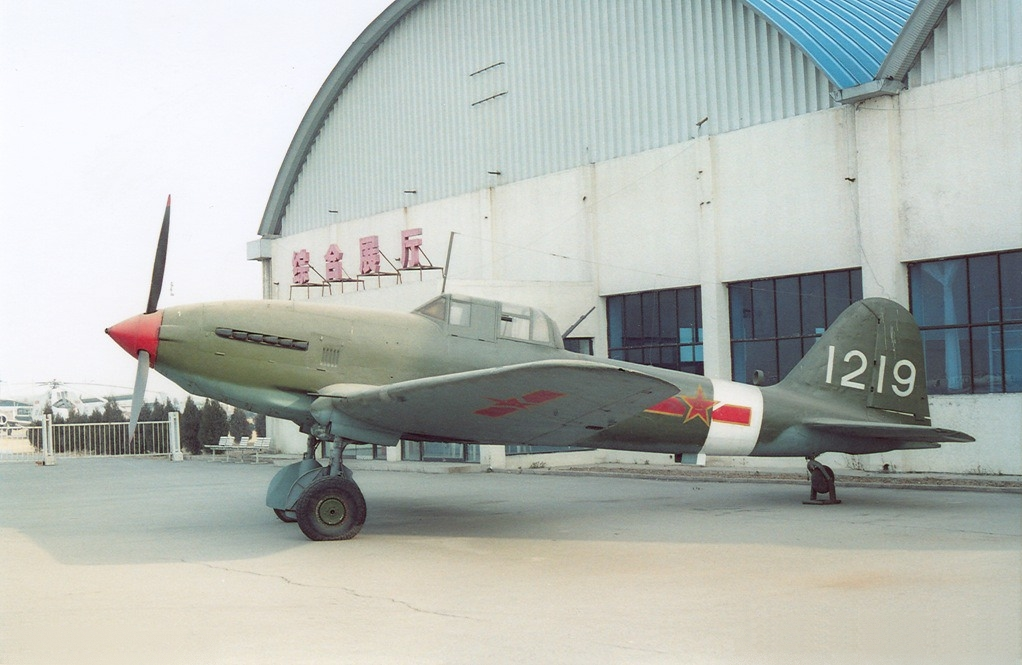
Ilyushin Il-10 (Chinese Aviation Museum)

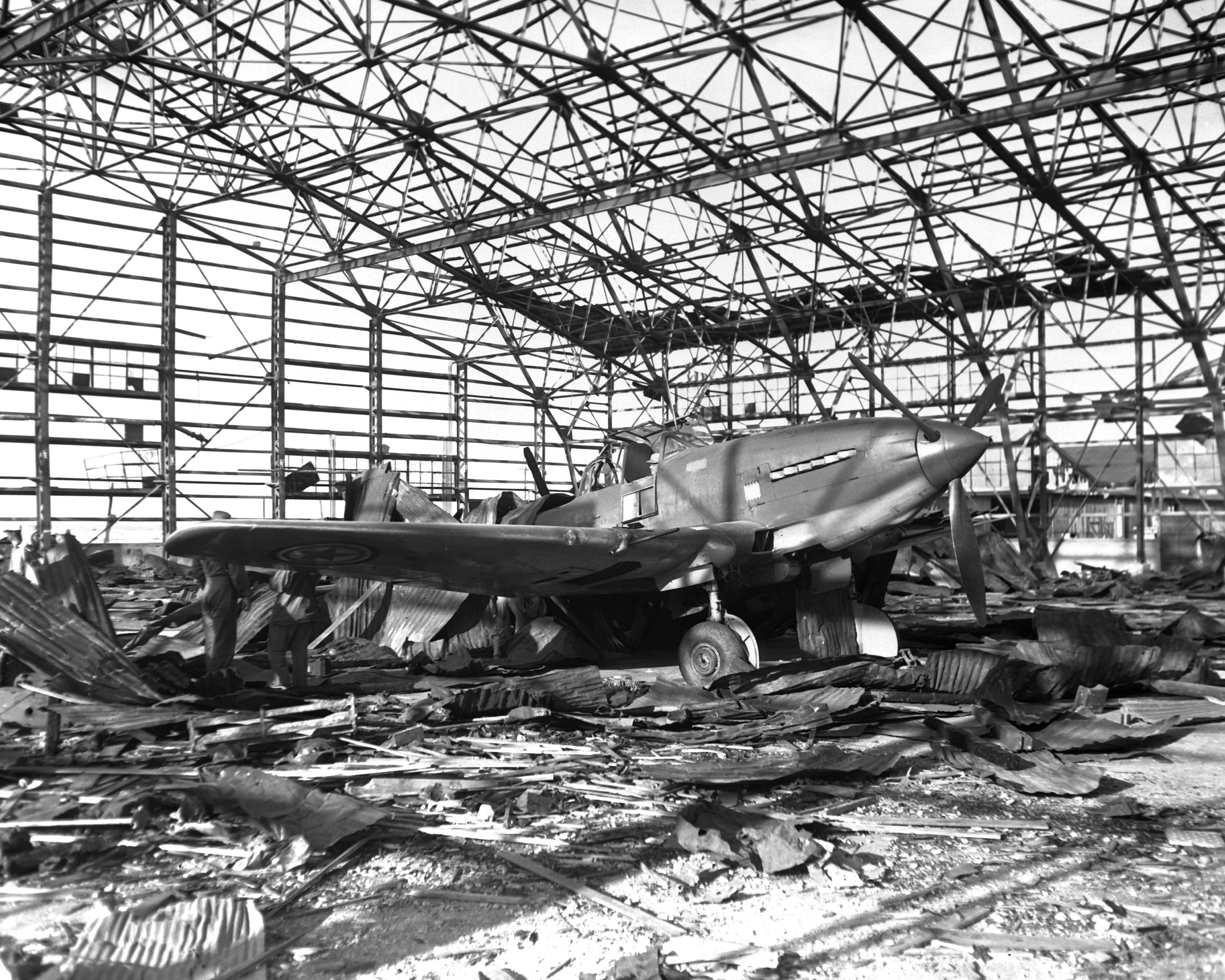
Il-10 of the Korean People's Air Force at Kimpo International Airport, South Korea, on 21 Sept 1950.

Kingdom of Afghanistan

- Afghan Air Force may have received some B-33 aircraft, but this is unconfirmed.

People's Republic of Bulgaria

- Bulgarian Air Force received first Il-10 aircraft in 1947, later unknown number of B-33s were delivered. All were withdrawn in 1954.

China

- People's Liberation Army Air Force From 1950 to 1952, 254 Il-10 attackers were imported, used by assault aviation divisions of PLAAF. They were used in combat during conflict with Taiwan on border islands in January 1955. The last 103 IL-10s retired in 1972.

Czechoslovak Socialist Republic

- Czechoslovak Air Force received about 80 Il-10s and 4–6 Il-10Us in summer 1950. Additionally about 600 of locally built B-33s were delivered. All were operated from 1950 through 1962.

Hungarian People's Republic

- Hungarian Air Force received 159 Il-10 aircraft (including about 14 training UIl-10) and operated it from 1949 through 1956. On retirement, 120 airframes were destroyed. The Il-10's Hungarian codename was "Párduc" (Panther).

Indonesia

- Indonesian Air Force received an unknown number of B-33s from Poland in 1957. Aircraft were modified in Poland and could carry additional 300-liter fuel tank under fuselage. Due to poor handling, aircraft were returned to Poland.

North Korea

- Korean People's Air Force received about 50 Il-10s, probably all were from World War II production.

Polish People's Republic

- Polish Air Force received about 120 Il-10 aircraft (probably 96 Il-10 and 24 UIl-10) and used it from February 1949 through 1959. Additionally at least 281 B-33 aircraft were delivered between 1954 and 1956 but all were withdrawn in 1961 due to poor quality. Polish B-33 aircraft were modified to carry additional fuel.

People's Republic of Romania

- Romanian Air Force received 14 old Il-10s and UIl-10s in 1950 and 1952. In 1953 140 B-33s and 16 CB-33s trainers were delivered and were used through 1960.

Soviet Union

- Soviet Air Force
- Soviet Naval Aviation

Kingdom of Yemen

- Yemen Air Force received 24 B-33 aircraft in 1957.

== Aircraft on display ==
- Il-10
  - Central Air Force Museum at Monino, outside of Moscow, Russia
  - Chinese Aviation Museum in Beijing, China
  - Museum of the Polish Army in Warsaw, Poland
  - National Museum of Romanian Aviation in Bucharest, Romania
- B-33 (licensed version produced in Czechoslovakia)
  - Lubuskie Military Museum in Drzonów, Poland
  - Polish Aviation Museum in Kraków, Poland
  - Prague Aviation Museum in Kbely, Czech Republic
  - Route E371, Nižný Komárnik in Nižný Komárnik, Prešov, Slovakia

== Specifications (Il-10) ==
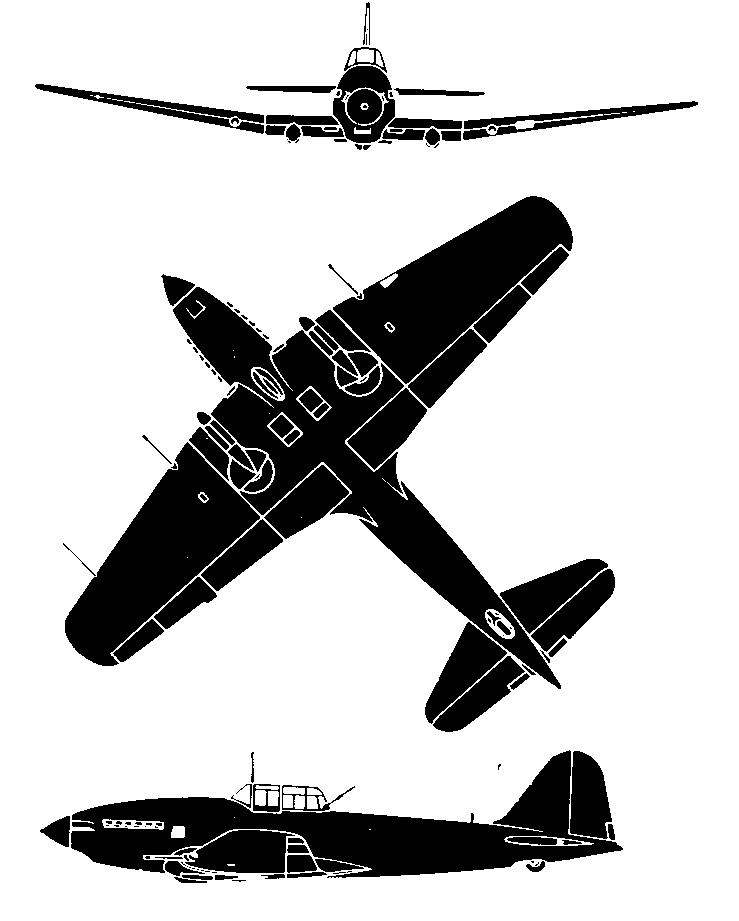

Data from Ilyushin's Proliferous Shturmovik – Part Two

General characteristics

- Crew: 2
- Length: 11.06 m (36 ft 3 in)
- Wingspan: 13.40 m (44 ft 0 in)
- Height: 4.18 m (13 ft 9 in) (tail up)
- Wing area: 30.00 m^{2} (322.9 sq ft)
- Empty weight: 4,680 kg (10,318 lb)
- Gross weight: 6,335 kg (13,966 lb)
- Max takeoff weight: 6,535 kg (14,407 lb)
- Fuel capacity: 747 L (164 imp gal; 197 US gal)
- Powerplant: 1 × Mikulin AM-42 liquid-cooled V12 engine, 1,320 kW (1,770 hp) (maximum continuous power, 2,350 rpm)
- Propellers: 3-bladed AV-5L-24, 3.60 m (11 ft 10 in) diameter

Performance

- Maximum speed: 551 km/h (342 mph, 298 kn) at 2,800 m (9,200 ft); 507 km/h (274 kn; 315 mph) at sea level
- Cruise speed: 310 km/h (190 mph, 170 kn) at 500 m (1,600 ft)
- Range: 800 km (500 mi, 430 nmi) at 500 m (1,600 ft)
- Service ceiling: 5,500 m (18,000 ft)
- Time to altitude: 5 minutes to 3,000 m (9,800 ft)

Armament

- Guns:
  - 2× 23 mm Vya-23 cannon (150 rpg) and 2× 7.62 mm ShKAS machine guns (750 rpg) in wing (war time production aircraft) or 4x 23 mm NS-23 (150 rpg) in wing (post-war time production aircraft) and
  - 1× 20 mm Berezin B-20 cannon (150 rpg) or 12.7 mm UBT machine gun (150 rpg) in rear turret
- Rockets: 4× RS-82 or RS-132 rockets
- Bombs:
  - 6× 50 kg (110 lb) bombs or
  - 4× 100 kg (220 lb) bombs or
  - 2× 250 kg (550 lb) bombs

== See also ==
Related development

- Ilyushin Il-2
- Ilyushin Il-8
- Ilyushin Il-16

Aircraft of comparable role, configuration, and era

- Sukhoi Su-6
- Douglas A-1 Skyraider
- Aichi B7A Ryusei

Related lists

- List of aircraft of World War II
