= ShVAK cannon =

ShVAK
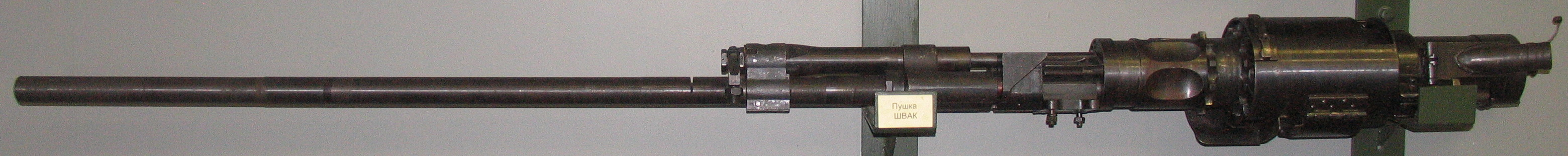
- Type: Autocannon
- Place of origin: USSR

Service history
- In service: From 1936
- Used by: Soviet armed forces
- Wars: From World War II

Production history
- Designer: Boris Shpitalniy and Semyon Vladimirov
- Designed: 1935–1936
- Produced: 1936–1946
- Variants: Three 20 mm variants for aircraft mounts plus, one tank variant (TNSh) also, 12.7 mm predecessor

Specifications
- Mass: 44.5 kg (98.1 lb) (SP/MP); 40 kg (88.2 lb) (KP); 42 kg (92.6 lb) (TP)
- Length: 2,122 mm (83.5 in) (SP/MP); 1,679 mm (66.1 in) (KP); 1,729 mm (68.1 in) (TP)
- Barrel length: 1,650 mm (65.0 in) (SP/MP); 1,255 mm (49.4 in) (KP/TP)
- Cartridge: 20×99mmR; 12.7x108mmR
- Cartridge weight: (OZ) 96.0
- Caliber: 20 mm (0.787 in); 12.7 mm (0.500 in)
- Barrels: 1
- Action: Gas-operated
- Rate of fire: 700–800 rounds/min (550-750 synchronized SP)
- Muzzle velocity: 750–790 metres per second (2,500–2,600 ft/s)
- Feed system: Belt-fed
- Filling weight: (OZ) 2.8 g HE + 3.3 g incendiary
- Detonation mechanism: (OZ) Nose fuze

The ShVAK (Russian: Шпитальный-Владимиров Авиационный Крупнокалиберный (ШВАК), romanized: Shpitalnyi-Vladimirov Aviatsionnyi Krupnokalibernyi, "Shpitalny-Vladimirov Aviation Large-calibre") was a 20 mm autocannon used by the Soviet Union during World War II. It was designed by Boris Shpitalniy and Semyon Vladimirov and entered production in 1936. ShVAK were installed in many models of Soviet aircraft. The TNSh was a version of the gun produced for light tanks (Russian: ТНШ: Tankovyi Nudel’man-Shpitalnyi). ShVAK shares the name with its 12.7 mm heavy machine gun predecessor.

== Development and production ==
=== 12.7x108mm ShVAK ===
The development of the 12.7 mm ShVAK was in response to a Soviet government decree passed on 9 February 1931, directing domestic manufacturers to produce an aircraft machine gun for the 12.7×108mm cartridge that had been introduced a couple of years prior for the DK machine gun. Tula designer S.V. Vladimirov answered the call by producing basically an enlarged version of the ShKAS, with a 1246 mm long barrel and a total length of 1726 mm. The first prototype was ready for trials on May 28, 1932. The testing process was fairly drawn out, but the 12.7 mm ShVAK was nominally adopted into service in 1934.

Series production officially started in 1935 at the INZ-2 factory in Kovrov, but production soon fell well behind schedule because the ShVAK receiver was fairly complex to manufacture. According to Soviet records, out of the 410 12.7 mm ShVAKs planned for aircraft in 1935, only 86 were completed; for the tank version, 40 had been planned but only 6 were delivered that same year. A 1952 Western intelligence report indicates that only "a few" ShVAKs were produced in the 12.7 mm caliber.

A further problem complicating the adoption of the gun was that the 12.7 mm ShVAK ended up not using the 12.7×108mm rimless cartridge used by the DK machine gun, but rather—because it was an adaptation of the ShKAS mechanism—it required its own rimmed 12.7 mm cases. Production of the rimmed 12.7 mm ammunition ceased in 1939, when it was decided that the Berezin UB was preferable because it could share ammunition with the DShK.

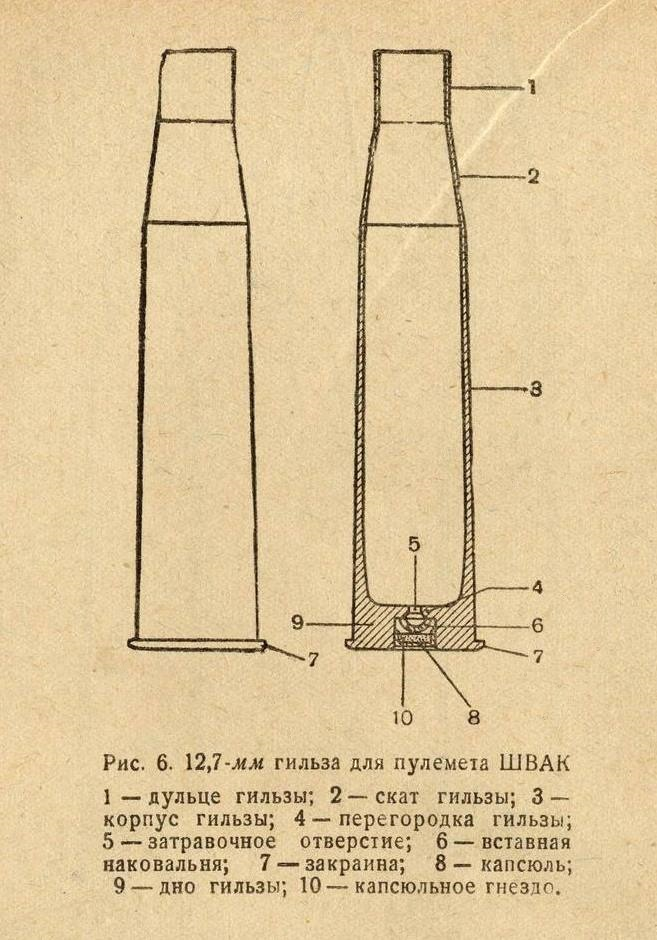
12,7x108R ShVAK MG cartridge case drawing.

=== 20×99mmR ShVAK ===
The 20 mm ShVAK was designed sometime between 1935 and 1936 and series production began in 1936. A few months later, production of the 12.7 mm version ceased. Similarly to its predecessors, the 20 mm ShVAK was a gas-operated gun, belt-fed by disintegrating link ammunition.

Depending on the intended mount, the ShVAKs were marked with "MP" for the tank version (total gun length 2122 mm; weight 44.5 kg), "KP" for the wing-mounted version (1679 mm total length; 40 kg), "TP" for flexible mounts (1726 mm length; 42 kg), and "SP" for synchronized installations.

The "bird-cage" feed system in the 20 mm ShVAK was an improved version of the ShKAS. It could hold 11 rounds and had an even smoother operation. As with the ShKAS, the purpose of the feed cage was to gradually delink the rounds, avoiding any belt lurch. The Berthier-type gas regulator had four holes (of 3.5, 4, 4.5, and 6 mm) allowing for different rates of fire to be selected. The most significant design difference from the ShKAS was that the gas cylinder was moved under the barrel in the ShVAK, giving it a more compact assembly.

The end of the barrel was threaded, and this thread was used to screw on a blast-reduction tube of a length that depended on the installation requirements:

One of the outstanding features of this weapon is the method of solving blast tube difficulties, a troublesome problem in all installations of aircraft cannon in fighter aircraft. The Soviets' simple solution was to thread the end of their standard barrel and then screw on for whatever length was needed a heavy piece of tubing, the bore diameter of which was slightly greater than that of the rotating band of the projectile. This arrangement allowed the blast and gas to leak around the projectile before it cleared the tube, not only reducing the blast effect of the weapon but also by its added length safely leading the blast and projectile past portions of the plane that would otherwise have been injured.

The 1952 Western intelligence report said of the 20 mm ShVAK: "in relation to its power, the gun is very light and extremely compact" and that it "has a range comparable to our M3 cannon, although their short barrel version is 16 pounds lighter". It was however considered "relatively difficult to produce" in American factories, because it was constructed from relatively soft parts (not heat-treated) that were then filed down. This choice of materials was assumed to be motivated by the desire to allow parts to "deform and bend well in advance of fracture" enabling a safer operation at a high rate of fire, but having the tradeoff of shorter overall lifespan of the gun.

Soviet archives indicate the 20-mm ShVAK was produced in large numbers during World War II:

- 1942 — 34,601 produced
- 1943 — 26,499
- 1944 — 25,633
- 1945 — 13,433
- 1946 — 754

After the war, the ShVAK was supplanted by the Berezin B-20, which offered similar performance but weighed significantly less.

== Installations ==
Three Polikarpov I-16 aircraft, all produced in January 1939, were armed with the propeller-synchronized version of the 12.7 mm ShVAK; this short series was given the I-16 Type 16 designation. The three fighter planes successfully passed the factory trials and were delivered to the VVS for military trials. The cancelled Yatsenko I-28 was also planned to use the 12.7 mm ShVAK in a synchronized pair, but the few prototypes which flew in the summer of 1939 did so without armament because a synchronizer for their engine had not been developed.

The 20 mm ShVAK was installed in the wings, in the nose, or in a synchronized mounting in the following fighters: Polikarpov I-153P and I-16, Mikoyan-Gurevich MiG-3, Yakovlev Yak-1, Yak-3, Yak-7, and Yak-9, LaGG-3, Lavochkin La-5 and La-7, the Petlyakov Pe-3 night fighter and on Soviet-modified Hawker Hurricane aircraft. It was also installed on the wings of the Tupolev Tu-2 bomber and some ground attack versions of the Petlyakov Pe-2 bomber also had it installed in a fixed mounting. Some early versions of the Ilyushin Il-2 ground attack aircraft also carried it, but superseded in that aircraft by the 23 mm Volkov-Yartsev VYa-23. The flexible-mount ShVAK was used in the Petlyakov Pe-8 and Yermolayev Yer-2 bombers.

The tank version was installed on the T-38 and T-60 light tanks.

== Ammunition ==
ShVAK ammunition consisted of a mix of fragmentation-incendiary and armor-piercing-incendiary rounds.

USSR Designation	US Abbreviation	Bullet Weight [g]	Muzzle Velocity [m/s]	Description
OZ	HEI	96.0	770	Nose fuze, 2.8 g HE + 3.3 g incendiary
OZT	HEI-T	96.5	770	Nose fuze, 2.8 g HE + 3.3 g incendiary, tracer
OF	HE-Frag.	91.0	790	Nose fuze, 6.7 g HE, fragmentation grooves on shell
OFZ	HEI-Frag.	91.0	790	Nose fuze, 0.8 g HE + 3.8 g incendiary, fragmentation grooves on shell
BZ	API-HC	96.0	750	Mild steel projectile case with hardened steel core, surrounded by 2.5 g incendiary, screwed on aluminum, or bakelite ballistic cap
BZ	API-HC	99.0	750	As above but with swaged steel nose cap
BZ	API	96.0	750	Solid steel shot with incendiary in swaged steel cap
BZT	API-T	96.0	750	As above but with tracer in base cavity
PU	TP	96.0	770	Inert filled HEI shell with dummy fuze
PUT	TP-T	96.5	770	Empty solid head projectile with swaged tracer in base cavity

There were problems with ammunition development as well. There were cases of premature cook-off of the ammunition in the barrel. The problem was first addressed in 1936 by changing the fuse from the MG-3 model to the MG-201 model, but the problem was not eliminated until the introduction of the K-6 fuse in 1938, which reliably prevented projectiles from arming until they were 30 to 50 cm out of the barrel.

== See also ==
- Berezin B-20
- Volkov-Yartsev VYa-23
- Revolver cannon
- List of firearms
- List of Russian weaponry
- List of common World War II weapons
