= IL-16 =

IL-16 or IL 16 can refer to:

- Interleukin 16
- Illinois's 16th congressional district
- Illinois Route 16
- Ilyushin Il-16
