= IL-8 =

IL-8 can refer to:

- Interleukin 8, a chemokine of the immune system
- Illinois's 8th congressional district
- Illinois Route 8
- Ilyushin Il-8
