= Ilyushin Il-1 =

1944 fighter aircraft prototype by Ilyushin

General information
- Type: Fighter
- Manufacturer: Ilyushin
- Status: Prototype only
- Number built: 1

History
- Manufactured: 1944
- First flight: 19 May 1944

The Ilyushin Il-1 (Cyrillic Илью́шин Ил-1) was a Soviet fighter aircraft developed during World War II by the Ilyushin design bureau. It was designed in 1943 as an armored fighter for use at low and medium altitudes against the latest German fighters, but by the time it made its first flight in 1944, the Soviets had already achieved air superiority and it was therefore redundant. Only one example was built, but the parallel two-seat attack version led to the successful Ilyushin Il-10.

== Development ==
In 1943, Sergey Ilyushin started work on a new aircraft, the Il-1 armoured fighter, in both single- and two-seat versions. The Il-1 was similar to the Ilyushin Il-2 design, but was more modern and compact, and powered with a new Mikulin engine, the AM-42. The Il-1 used the same principle of a stress-bearing armored shell to protect the engine and pilot as did the Il-2, but protection was increased by moving the oil cooler and radiator inside the shell, cooled by wing-root ducts that exhausted through an armored slot on the underside. The landing gear retracted aft and the wheels rotated to lie flat within the wings. The two VYa-23 cannon were carried over from the Il-2, but they were its only gun armament. 200 kg (440 lb) of bombs could be carried externally in overload condition. A cassette of ten AG-2 aerial grenades was carried to drop in the path of pursuing fighters.

The Il-1 made its first flight on 19 May 1944 and demonstrated a top speed of 580 km/h (360 mph) during its manufacturer's trials, but this was significantly less than that of Soviet fighters already in service and Ilyushin decided not to submit it for State acceptance trials.

From the beginning, Ilyushin had decided to turn the two-seat version of the Il-1 into a ground-attack aircraft, with the designation changed to Ilyushin Il-10 in April 1944 as odd numbers were reserved for fighters. The Il-10 first flew on 19 April 1944, and underwent successful state trials the following month.

== Operators ==
Soviet Union

- Soviet Air Force

== Specifications (Il-1) ==
Data from The Osprey Encyclopedia of Russian Aircraft 1875–1995

General characteristics

- Crew: 1 or 2
- Length: 11.12 m (36 ft 6 in)
- Wingspan: 13.4 m (44 ft 0 in)
- Height: 4.08 m (13 ft 5 in)
- Wing area: 30 m^{2} (320 sq ft)
- Empty weight: 4,285 kg (9,447 lb)
- Gross weight: 5,320 kg (11,729 lb)
- Powerplant: 1 × Mikulin AM-42 V-12 liquid-cooled piston engine, 1,472 kW (1,974 hp) for take-off
- Propellers: 3-bladed variable-pitch propeller

Performance

- Maximum speed: 580 km/h (360 mph, 310 kn) at 3,260 m (10,700 ft)
- Range: 1,000 km (620 mi, 540 nmi)
- Service ceiling: 8,600 m (28,200 ft)
- Time to altitude: 1,000 m (3,300 ft) in 1 minute 36 seconds

Armament

- Guns: 2 × 23 mm VYa-23 cannons
- Bombs: 200 kg (440 lb) bombs, dispenser for 10 grenades in rear fuselage

== See also ==
Related development

- Ilyushin Il-2
- Ilyushin Il-10

Aircraft of comparable role, configuration, and era

- Sukhoi Su-7
