= UBK =

UBK is acronym that may be related to:

- Berezin UB § Development
- Ukraine without Kuchma, the 2001 Ukrainian protests against President Leonid Kuchma
