= Boris Shpitalniy =

Soviet weapons designer (1902–1972)

Boris Gavriilovich Shpitalny
- Борис Гавриилович Шпитальный
- Born: 7 August [O.S. 25 July] 1902; Rostov-on-Don, Russian Empire
- Died: 6 February 1972; Moscow, USSR
- Awards: Hero of Socialist Labour

Boris Gavriilovich Shpitalny (Russian: Борис Гавриилович Шпитальный; 7 August [O.S. 25 July] 1902 – 6 February 1972) was a Soviet designer of aircraft guns and cannons and one of the first people awarded the title Hero of Socialist Labor.

== Career ==
Boris Shpitalny graduated from MAMI Moscow State Technical University in 1927. Three years later, Boris Shpitalny together with Irinarkh Komaritsky designed the ShKAS machine gun, a 7.62 mm machine gun widely used by Soviet aircraft in the 1930s and during World War II. In 1939, a small number of Ultra-ShKAS were produced featuring a firing rate of 3,000 rounds per minute, but these saw only limited use due to reliability problems. ShKAS served as the basis for the ShVAK cannon in 1936 (designed in collaboration with Semyon Vladimirov). This 20-mm autocannon was installed in many Soviet aircraft including Yakovlev Yak-1, Polikarpov I-153 and I-16, Lavochkin La-5 and La-7, LaGG-3, early Ilyushin Il-2, and Soviet-modified Hawker Hurricane aircraft, as well as T-38 and T-60 tanks. His 37 mm autocannon, the Sh-37, was less successful though, and saw only brief service between 1941 and 1942.

In 1934-1953, Boris Shpitalny was the head and chief designer of the special design bureau number 15 (особое КБ 15) and then a professor at the Moscow Institute of Geodesy, Aerial Photography & Mapmaking. For his development of new types of aircraft guns, he was awarded the title Hero of Socialist Labour in 1940, two USSR State Prizes in 1941 and 1942, and various medals.
