= Savin–Norov machine gun =

SN machine gun
- Type: Aircraft machine gun
- Place of origin: Soviet Union

Service history
- In service: 1939–1940
- Used by: Soviet Air Forces
- Wars: Winter War

Production history
- Designer: Ivan Savin, Aleksandr Norov
- Designed: 1935
- No. built: at least 14 built; 6 used in service

Specifications
- Cartridge: 7.62×54mmR
- Caliber: 7.62 mm
- Action: Gas-operated
- Rate of fire: 2800–3600 RPM
- Feed system: Belt
- Sights: Iron sights

The SN (Savin and Norov) was an aircraft machine gun manufactured in small numbers in the Soviet Union before World War II.

The gun was intended to achieve a higher rate of fire than the ShKAS, while using the same 7.62×54mmR cartridge. In order to achieve this goal, the barrel and bolt moved in opposite directions. Sources vary as to high a rate of fire was actually achieved. One indicates "more than 3600 RPM" while others give the 2800–3000 RPM range.

== History ==
The SN gun was designed in 1934-1935 by I.V. Savin (И.В. Савин) and A.K. Norov (А.К. Норов). According to a Western source, it was offered to the VVS, which rejected it in 1936. Soviet sources indicate that the SN machine gun was installed in the wings of three Polikarpov I-16 aircraft in January 1939; these planes were given the designation I-16 Type 19 and they took part in the Winter War. The gun was also supposed to be installed in a propeller-synchronized mounting in the I-16 Type 20.

Although four planes were built in this configuration, they did not go into service; the Type 20 designation was then reused for I-16 aircraft only armed with ShKAS guns, but capable of carrying drop tanks.

A further type I-16 Type 22 was planned to be armed with four propeller-synchronized guns, two of which were supposed to be SN guns (and the other two ShKAS), but this type was apparently never built and was cancelled in August 1939. As with the UltraShKAS, the reliability of the SN machine gun was low, so it did not go into mass production.

An SN exemplar could be seen (in 1996) at the Central Air Force Museum.

== See also ==
- ShKAS machine gun
- SIBEMAS machine gun
- List of firearms
- List of Russian weaponry
- List of common World War II weapons
