= 23×152mmB =

Soviet large-caliber autocannon cartridge

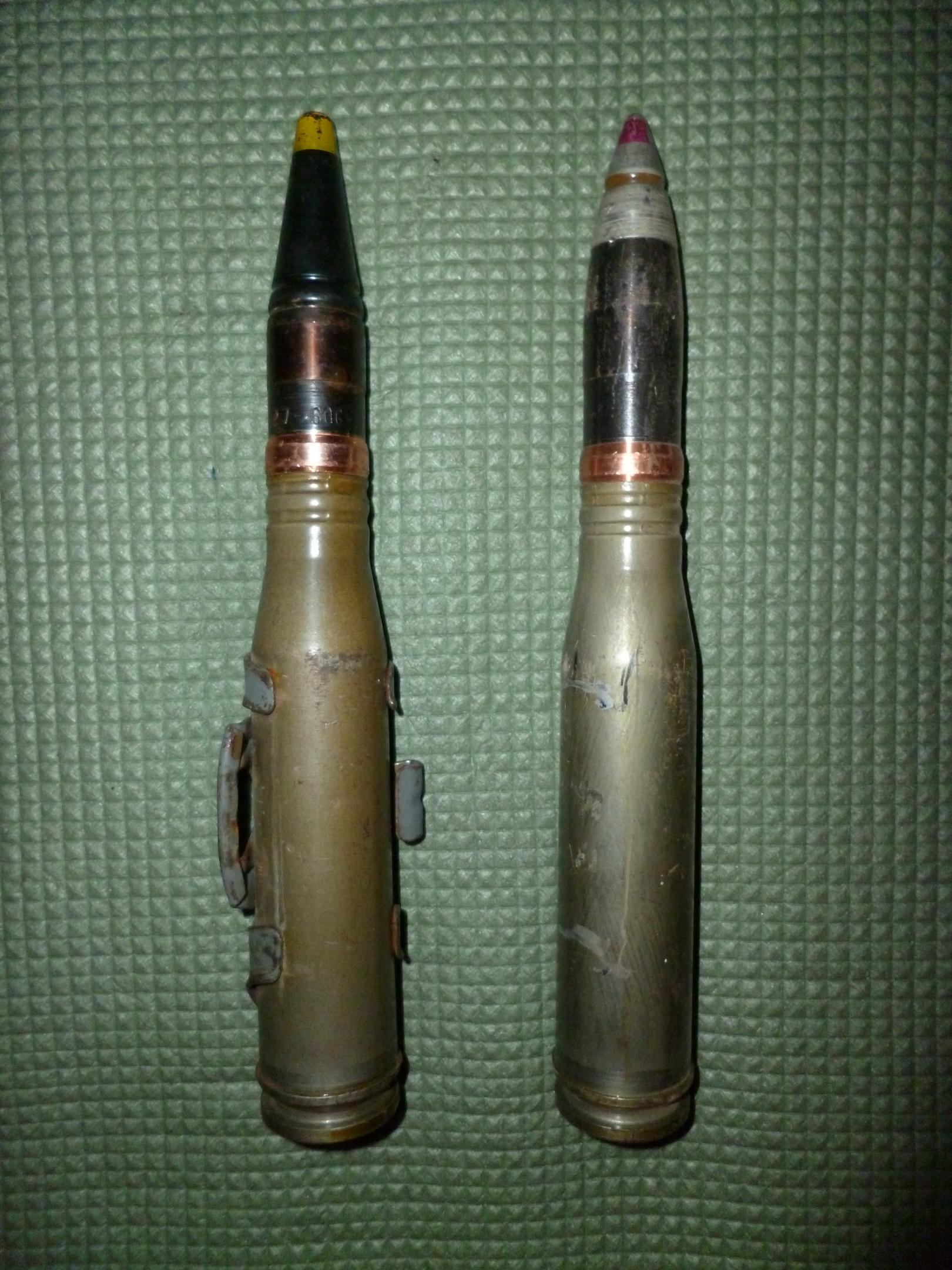
- 23×152mmB API (left) and HEI (right)
- Type: Autocannon
- Place of origin: Soviet Union

Service history
- Used by: Historically: USSR, Warsaw Pact Contemporarily: second-, and third-world countries

Production history
- Designed: 1941

Specifications
- Case type: Belted, bottlenecked
- Bullet diameter: 23 mm (0.91 in)
- Neck diameter: 23.7 mm (0.93 in)
- Shoulder diameter: 31.3 mm (1.23 in)
- Base diameter: 33.2 mm (1.31 in)
- Rim diameter: 34.6 mm (1.36 in)
- Rim thickness: 33.4 mm (1.31 in)
- Case length: 151 mm (5.9 in)
- Overall length: 235.6 mm (9.28 in)
- Maximum pressure: 2925 kgf/cm^{2}

Ballistic performance
| Bullet mass/type | Velocity | Energy |
|---|---|---|
| 190 g (2,932 gr) BZ API | 980 m/s (3,200 ft/s) | 88,917 J (65,582 ft⋅lbf) |
- Test barrel length: 2008mm

The 23×152mmB is a large-caliber cartridge used by the USSR/CIS in the VYa-23 aircraft autocannon, the Ilyushin Il-2 ground attack aircraft, and in the 2A7 and 2A14 autocannons on the ZU-23-2 anti-aircraft gun series and ZSU-23-4 "Shilka", among others.

Note that the ammunition for the VYa-23 uses a brass case and is not functionally interchangeable with the steel-cased ammunition of the modern ZU-23 anti-aircraft gun series. These two weapons use different headspace sizes, therefore requiring ammunition of slightly different dimensions. While it is no longer in use in the main anti-aircraft weapons of modern Russia, being replaced by the 30×165mm, it is still in service with the Russian Naval Infantry and many other countries.

== Specifications ==
| Dimensions: | 23×152mm Belted |
| Muzzle Velocity: | 970-980 m/s (from 2A7 & 2A14) 3182-3215 fps |
| Bullet Weight: | 184–190 grams |
| Bullet Types: | OZ/OFZ (HEI), OZT/OFZT (HEI-T), BZ/BZT (API/API-T) |
| Weapon Systems: | Volkov-Yartsev VYa-23, 2A7, 2A10, 2A14. |
| Applications: | ZU-23, ZSU-23-4 "Shilka", BMP-23, BTR-94, others. |
| Energy: | ~88916.64 J (estimated) ~65581.54 ft lbs (estimated) |

Iran has produced the Baher anti-material rifle chambered for this round. The stated purpose is to take down helicopters and vehicles.

== See also ==
- 23×115mm, used mainly in aircraft weapons such as bomber defense guns and fighter aircraft
