= Nudelman-Rikhter NR-23 =

NR-23
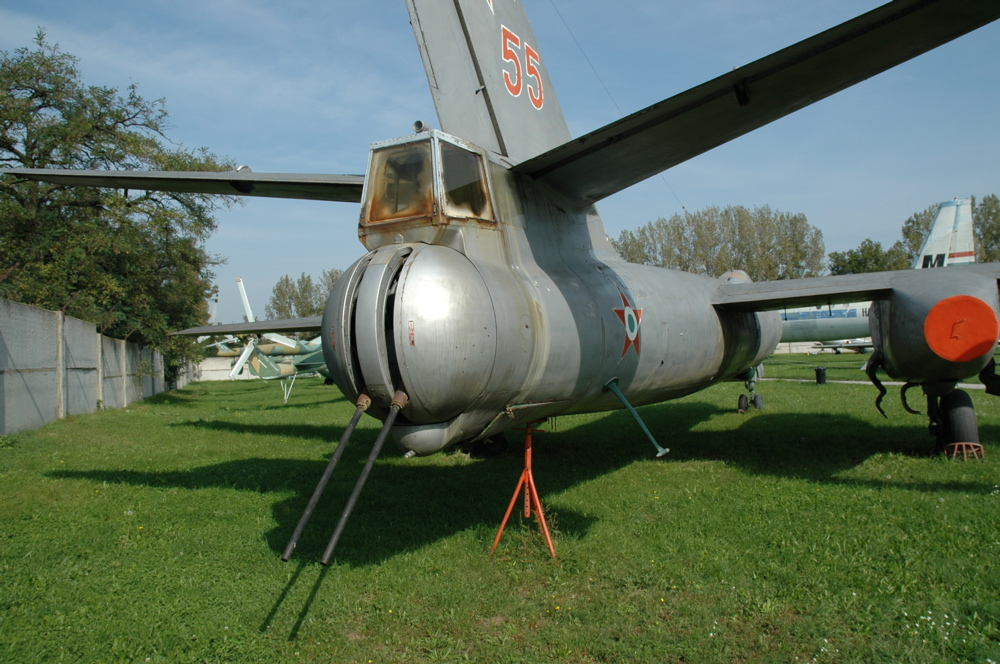
- Two NR-23 cannons in the tail barbette of the Il-28 bomber.
- Type: Single-barrel Autocannon
- Place of origin: Soviet Union

Production history
- Variants: Norinco Type 23-1 and Type 23-2 NR-23k (Prototype)

Specifications
- Mass: 39 kg (86 lb)
- Length: 1,980 mm (6 ft 6 in)
- Barrel length: 1,450 mm (4 ft 9 in)
- Width: 165 mm (6.5 in)
- Height: 136 mm (5.4 in)
- Caliber: 23×115 mm (0.9 in)
- Barrels: 1
- Action: Short recoil
- Rate of fire: 800–850 rpm
- Muzzle velocity: 690 m/s (2,264 ft/s)

The Nudelman-Rikhter NR-23 (Нудельман и Рихтер НР-23) is a Soviet autocannon widely used in military aircraft of the Soviet Union and Warsaw Pact. It was designed by A. E. Nudelman and A. A. Richter to replace the wartime Nudelman-Suranov NS-23 and Volkov-Yartsev VYa-23, entering service in 1949.

The NR-23 is a single-barrel, short recoil-operated 23 mm (0.9 in) cannon. It was similar to the NS-23 but mechanical improvements increased its rate of fire by more than 50%. Its theoretical rate of fire was 850 rounds per minute, although United States Air Force tests of captured weapons achieved an actual rate of fire of only 650 rounds per minute.

The NR-23 was later replaced by the Afanasev Makarov AM-23 automatic cannon which had a higher firing rate. The AM-23 was used in turreted installations for bombers. It was a gas-operated weapon, weighed 43 kg (95 lb) and was capable of a substantially higher rate of fire (1,200–1,300 rounds per minute).

The People's Republic of China manufactures copies of both versions of this weapon as Norinco Type 23-1 (NR-23) and Type 23-2 (AM-23), respectively.

== Applications ==
The NR-23 was used on fighter aircraft, including the MiG-15, Lavochkin La-15, MiG-17, and some models of the MiG-19. In addition, it was also used on the Ilyushin Il-28 and Beriev Be-6. The AM-23 was used in the defensive turrets of the Antonov An-12B, Myasishchev M-4, Tupolev Tu-14, Tupolev Tu-16, Tupolev Tu-95/Tu-142, and the Tupolev Tu-98 prototype.

In the mid-1960s the cannon was replaced in Soviet service by the twin-barrel Gryazev-Shipunov GSh-23L.

The mechanism of the NR-23 was scaled up to produce the more powerful NR-30 30 mm gun used in the MiG-19 and some marks of the MiG-21.

== See also ==
- Volkov-Yartsev VYa-23
- Rikhter R-23

== Notes and references ==
- Koll, Christian (2009). Soviet Cannon - A Comprehensive Study of Soviet Arms and Ammunition in Calibres 12.7mm to 57mm. Austria: Koll. p. 136. ISBN 978-3-200-01445-9. Archived from the original on 2009-10-19.
