= Nudelman-Suranov NS-23 =

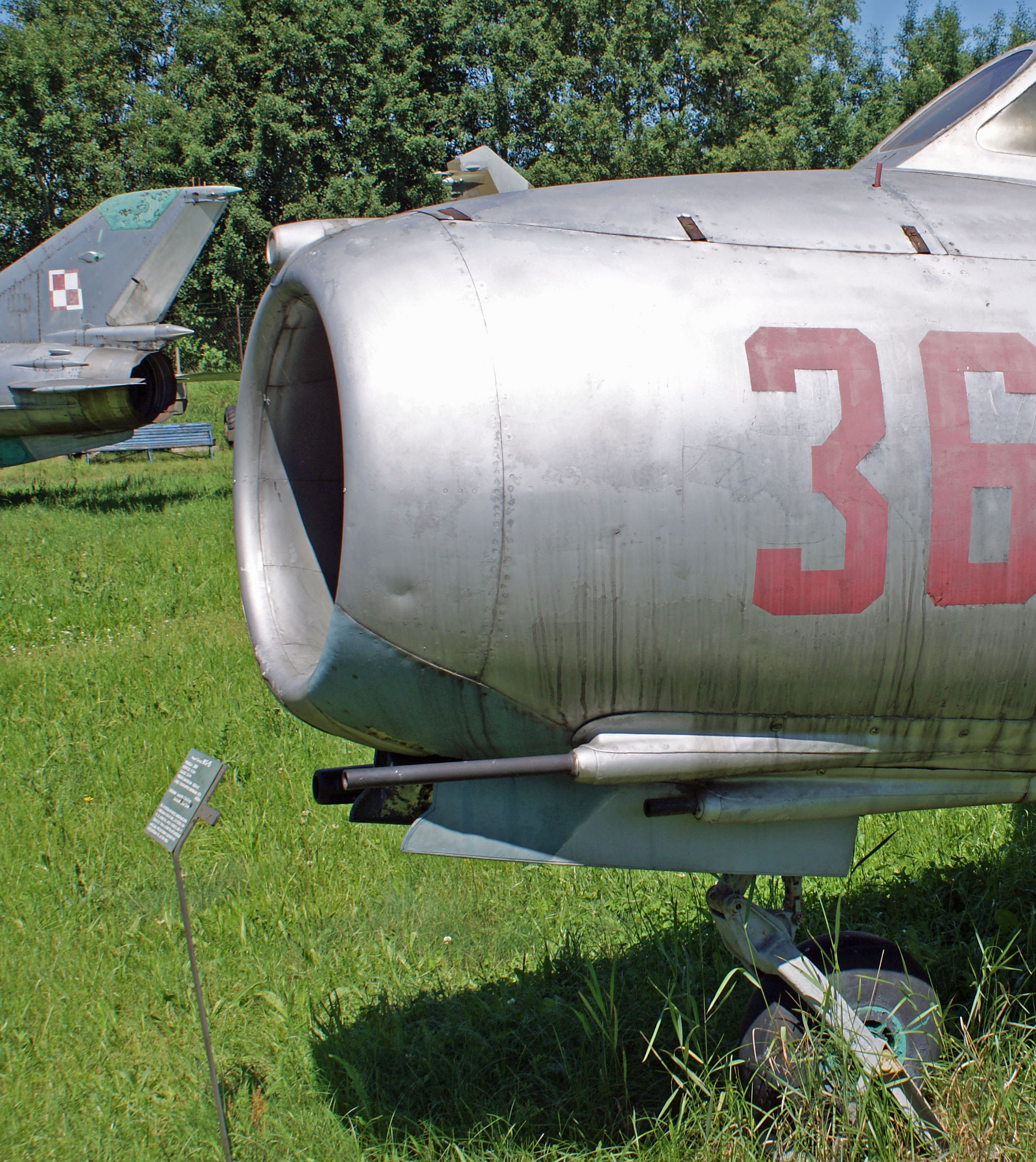
- NS-23 cannons on a Mig-15 at Muzeum Polskiej Techniki Wojskowej, Warsaw
- Type: Autocannon
- Place of origin: USSR

Service history
- Used by: USSR
- Wars: Cold War

Production history
- Produced: 1944–1953
- No. built: 28,479
- Variants: NS-23k

Specifications
- Mass: 37 kilograms (82 lb)
- Length: 198.5 centimetres (6.51 ft)
- Barrel length: 145 centimetres (4.76 ft)
- Shell: 23×115mm
- Shell weight: 175 g (6.2 oz)
- Caliber: 23 millimetres (0.91 in)
- Barrels: 1
- Action: short recoil
- Rate of fire: 550 rpm
- Muzzle velocity: 690 metres per second (2,300 ft/s)
- Feed system: belt

The NS-23 was a 23 mm (0.91 in) aircraft cannon designed by A. E. Nudelman, A. Suranov, G. Zhirnykh, V. Nemenov, S. Lunin, and M. Bundin during World War II as a replacement for the Volkov-Yartsev VYa-23 cannon. It entered service in 1944. The NS-23 round was derived from the 14.5×114mm anti-tank round by necking it out to 23 mm.

A synchronized version, designated NS-23S (for synchronized), was used for fixed installations firing through the propeller arc.

Applications of the NS-23 included the Antonov An-2, Ilyushin Il-10, Ilyushin Il-22, Lavochkin La-9, La-15, MiG-9, Yak-9UT, Yak-15, Yak-17, Yak-23, and Tu-4. Some early MiG-15s were also equipped with the NS-23.

The NS-23 was replaced in service by the Nudelman-Rikhter NR-23 around 1949.
