= Volkov-Yartsev VYa-23 =

Volkov Yartsev VYa-23
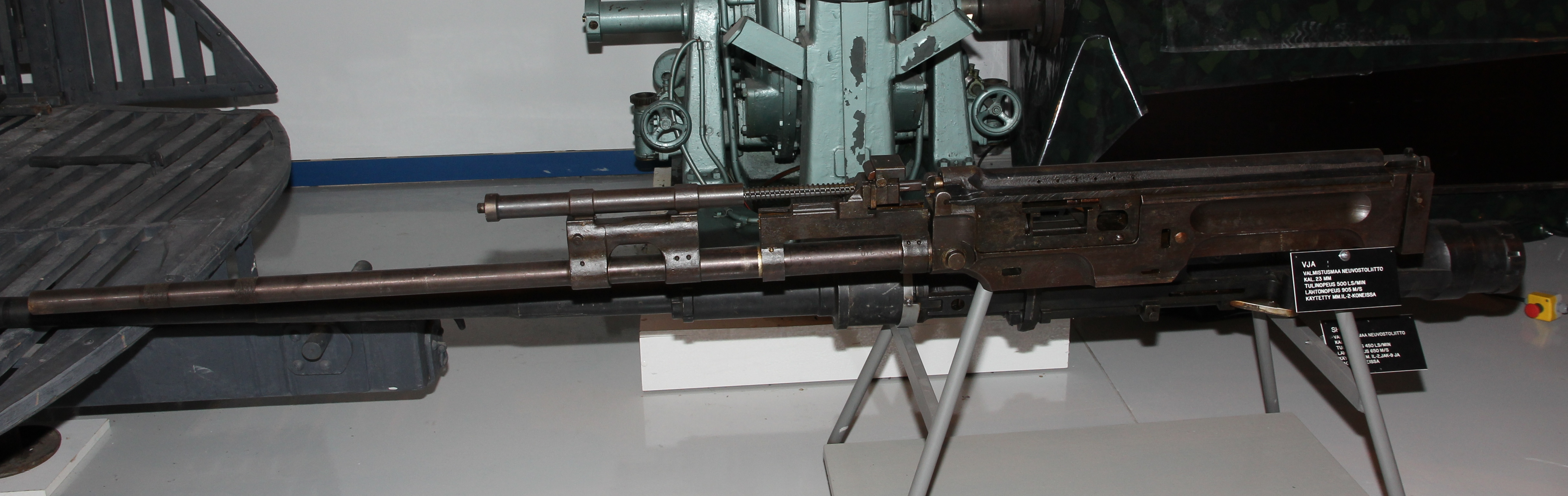
- VYa-23 cannon
- Type: Aircraft autocannon
- Place of origin: Soviet Union

Service history
- In service: 1941–?
- Used by: Soviet Union
- Wars: World War II

Production history
- Designer: A.A. Volkov and S.A. Yartsev
- Designed: 1940–41
- No. built: 64,655

Specifications
- Mass: 62.8 kg (138 lb)
- Length: 2.147 metres (7 ft 1 in)
- Barrel length: 1.65 metres (5 ft 5 in)
- Cartridge: 23x152mmB
- Caliber: 23 mm (1 in)
- Barrels: 1
- Rate of fire: 600–650 rounds/min
- Muzzle velocity: 905 m/s (2,969 ft/s)

The Volkov-Yartsev VYa-23 (Волков-Ярцев ВЯ-23) was a 23 mm (0.91 in) autocannon, used on Soviet aircraft during World War II.

== Development ==
In 1940, A.A. Volkov and S.A. Yartsev created an autocannon, called TKB-201 for the new 23 mm round. It was intended to be the primary weapon of the Ilyushin Il-2 ground attack aircraft. The original intention was to create a gun capable of penetrating German tank armour.

Due to unavailability of Il-2, the first airborne testing was performed using a Messerschmitt Bf 110 heavy fighter sold by Germany in 1940. After testing on Il-2 in 1941, TKB-201 was accepted into service as VYa-23. A total of 64,655 VYa-23 were built.

== Description ==
The VYa-23 is a gas-operated belt-fed autocannon with a rate of fire of 600 rounds per minute - a high rate of fire for the caliber at the time. The gun was 2.140 metres long, and weighed 68 kg. Its main disadvantages are powerful recoil and very abrupt functioning of the firing and reloading mechanisms which decreased service life and often caused jamming that could not be fixed in mid-air.

According to a US intelligence report, the VYa-23 used an upscaled version of the Berezin UB mechanism.

== Ammunition ==
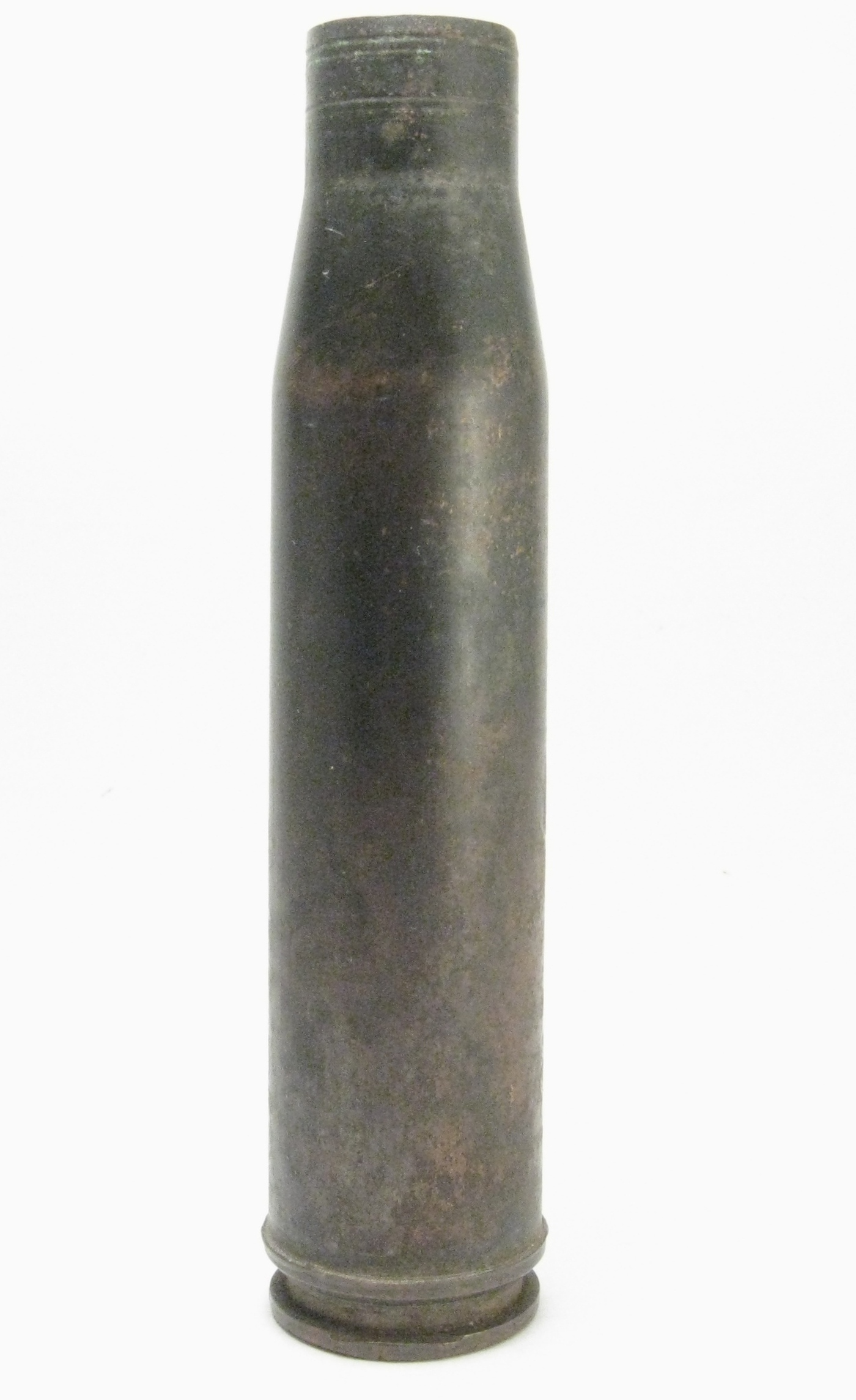
Cartridge from VYa-23

A powerful new 23×152mm cartridge was specifically developed for the VYa. The same caliber was later used also in the post-war towed ZU-23 and self-propelled ZSU-23-4 23mm AA guns. However, the ammunition for this later AA gun has a different powder charge and primer, and is thus not interchangeable. The ammunition is externally easily recognizable: VYa ammunition has brass cases, while post-war AA ammunition has steel cases.

The ammunition for VYa included fragmentation-incendiary, fragmentation-incendiary-tracer, and armor-piercing-incendiary rounds. The total weight and filling of HE rounds were more than twice that of the 20 mm ammunition used by the ShVAK and Berezin B-20 cannons. The armor-piercing round could penetrate 25 mm (1 in) of armor at 400 m (1,300 ft). The main characteristics of VYa ammunition according to Christian Koll's Russian Ammunition site are listed in the table below:

Designation	Type	Projectile Weight [g]	Bursting charge [g]	Muzzle Velocity [m/s]	Description
BZ	API	196..198	none	905	68g hard steel core and incendiary in the windshield cap. Two types with different caps (aluminium and swaged steel) are found. Penetration 25 mm RHA at 400 m and perpendicular impact.
OZ	HEI	198	15 (RDX/Al/wax)	905	HE incendiary round with a K-20 or DV nose fuze.
OZT	HEI-T	190	12 (RDX/Al/wax)	905	HE incendiary round with a K-20 or DV nose fuze and a reduced HE charge due to the space taken by the tracer.
PUT	TP-T	198	none	905	Practice round with tracer, based on the OZT but with a dummy fuze and inert filling in HE cavity.

== Production ==
A total of 64,655 VYa-23 were produced. Soviet archives give the following known production numbers by year:

- 1942 — 13,420
- 1943 — 16,430
- 1944 — 22,820
- 1945 — 873
- 1946 — 2,002
- 1947 — 1,247

== Service ==
The VYa-23 cannon was mounted on Il-2 and Il-10 ground attack aircraft, on LaGG-3 and Yak-9 fighter aircraft, and on the experimental Mikoyan-Gurevich DIS long range fighter aircraft.

In spite of the large round, the VYa-23 proved to be a disappointment in its intended anti-tank role. Light German tanks could be defeated from the side or rear only, with front armor of all tanks impervious. Medium tanks could be defeated if hit into the top of the turret or the engine compartment from under 400 m (1,300 ft) in a greater than 40-degree dive—a very difficult maneuver in Il-2 even under the most ideal conditions compounded by the difficulty of aiming at a small target.

== See also ==
Related developments:

- Nudelman-Suranov NS-23, the VYa-23's successor which replaced it on the IL-10 and in other applications

Similar weapons:

- 2A14 cannons in ZU-23
- ShVAK cannon
- MG FF cannon
- MG 151 cannon
- Hispano HS.404 cannon
- Berezin B-20 cannon
