= Berezin UB =

UB machine gun
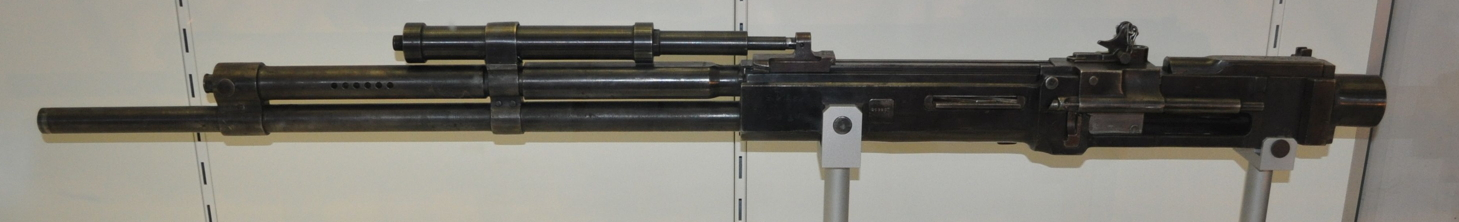
- UBS machine gun on display at the Steven F. Udvar-Hazy Center
- Type: Machine gun
- Place of origin: Soviet Union

Service history
- Used by: Soviet Union
- Wars: World War II

Production history
- Designer: Mikhail Yevgenyevich Berezin
- Designed: 1937–39

Specifications
- Mass: 21.45 kilograms (47.3 lb) (UBS); 21.14 kilograms (46.6 lb) (UBK); 21.43 kilograms (47.2 lb) (UBT)
- Length: 1,347 mm (53.0 in) (UBS, UBK); 1,397 mm (55.0 in) (UBT)
- Barrel length: 890 mm (35.0 in)
- Cartridge: 12.7×108mm
- Action: Gas
- Rate of fire: 800–1050 RPM (700-800 synchronized UBS)
- Muzzle velocity: 814 m/s (2,670 ft/s)
- Feed system: Belt-fed
- Sights: Iron sights

The Berezin UB (Russian: УБ - Универсальный Березина) (Berezin's Universal) was a 12.7 mm caliber Soviet aircraft machine gun widely used during World War II.

== Development ==
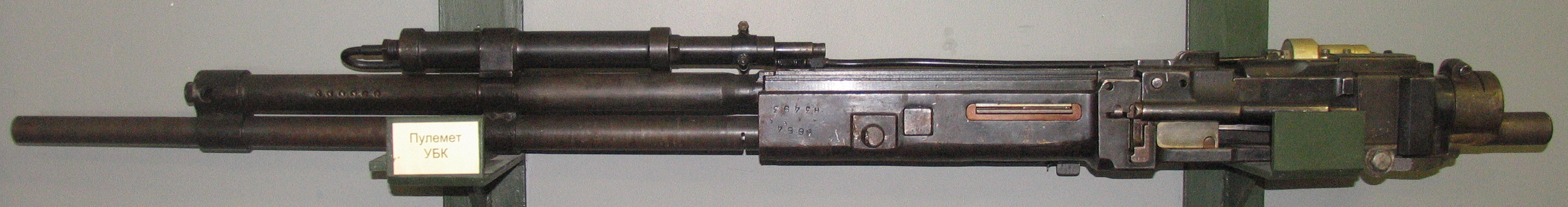
UBK

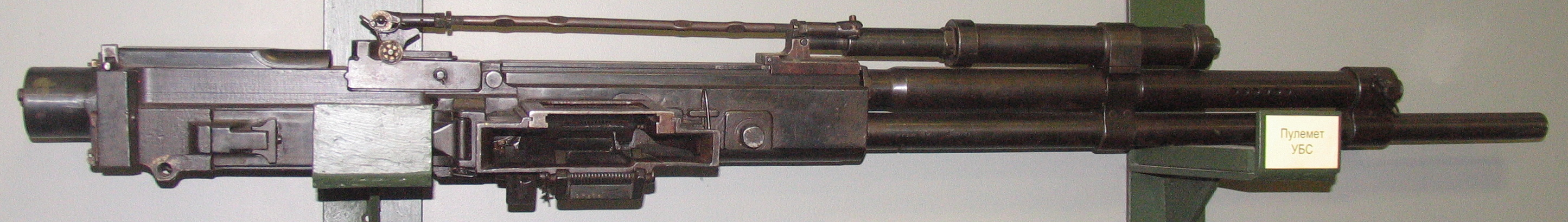
UBS

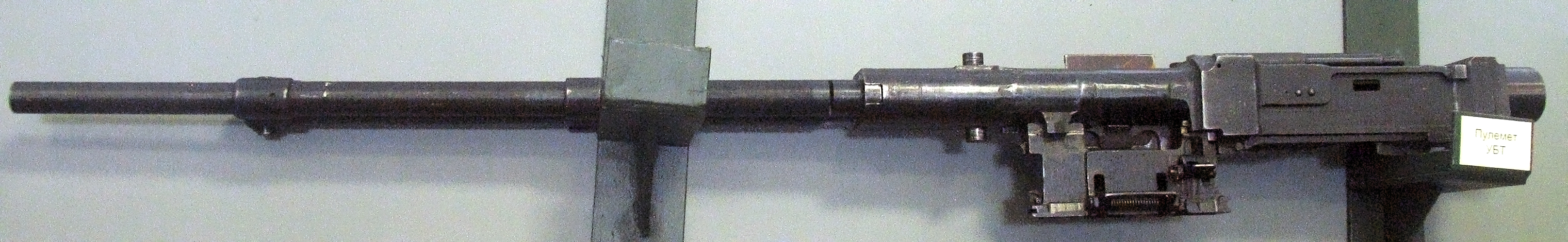
UBT

In 1937, Mikhail Berezin began designing a new large-caliber aircraft machine gun chambered to the 12.7 mm round used by infantry machine guns. The new design passed factory trials in 1938 and was accepted into service in 1939 under the designation BS (Березин Синхронный, Berezin Sinkhronniy, Berezin Synchronized). The rate of fire made it well suited for use as defensive armament in aircraft. While a successful design, BS was not without its faults, the biggest being its cable-operated charging which required considerable physical strength.

Continued development resulted in the improved UB which came in three versions: UBK (Крыльевой, Krylyevoi, for the wings), UBS (Синхронный, Sinkhronniy, Synchronized), and UBT (Турельный, Turelniy, for the turret), with UBS and UBK charged by compressed air. The UB was accepted into service on April 22, 1941, just two months before the German invasion of the Soviet Union.

== Description ==
The Berezin UB is a gas-operated air-cooled machine gun chambered for the Soviet 12.7×108mm infantry machine gun round. Ammunition is supplied via a disintegrating link belt with a unique system in which each new round helps to extract the spent cartridge. Another unusual feature is that the belt is advanced during the return of the moving portion of the gun and not during the recoil. Turret installations were charged manually, while wing and synchronized versions utilized pneumatic charging.

The UB in all variants was used by the vast majority of Soviet military aircraft of World War II.

A declassified 1952 US intelligence report notes that: "The Shkas was a comparatively intricate and well finished gun, the cost of which necessitated that it be kept in operating condition as long as possible by repair and replacement of parts. In contrast to the Shkas, the Beresin was deliberately expendable, that is, the Soviets' plan was to discard the entire gun after a short period of use during which one or another of the principal operating mechanisms became worn or broken." The same report notes that: "The design of the Beresin machine gun was greatly influenced by a captured Lahti 20-mm machine cannon; many features of the Finnish gun appear in all models of the Beresin."

== Production ==
The following production numbers could be found in the Soviet archives:

- 1941 — 6,300
- 1943 — 43,690
- 1944 — 38,340
- 1945 — 42,952

== Influences ==
The Berezin B-20 autocannon was a UB rebarrelled to 20×99mm.

The Volkov-Yartsev VYa-23 autocannon used an upscaled version of the UB mechanism.

== See also ==
- List of Russian weaponry
- M2 Browning machine gun
