= Berezin B-20 =

B-20
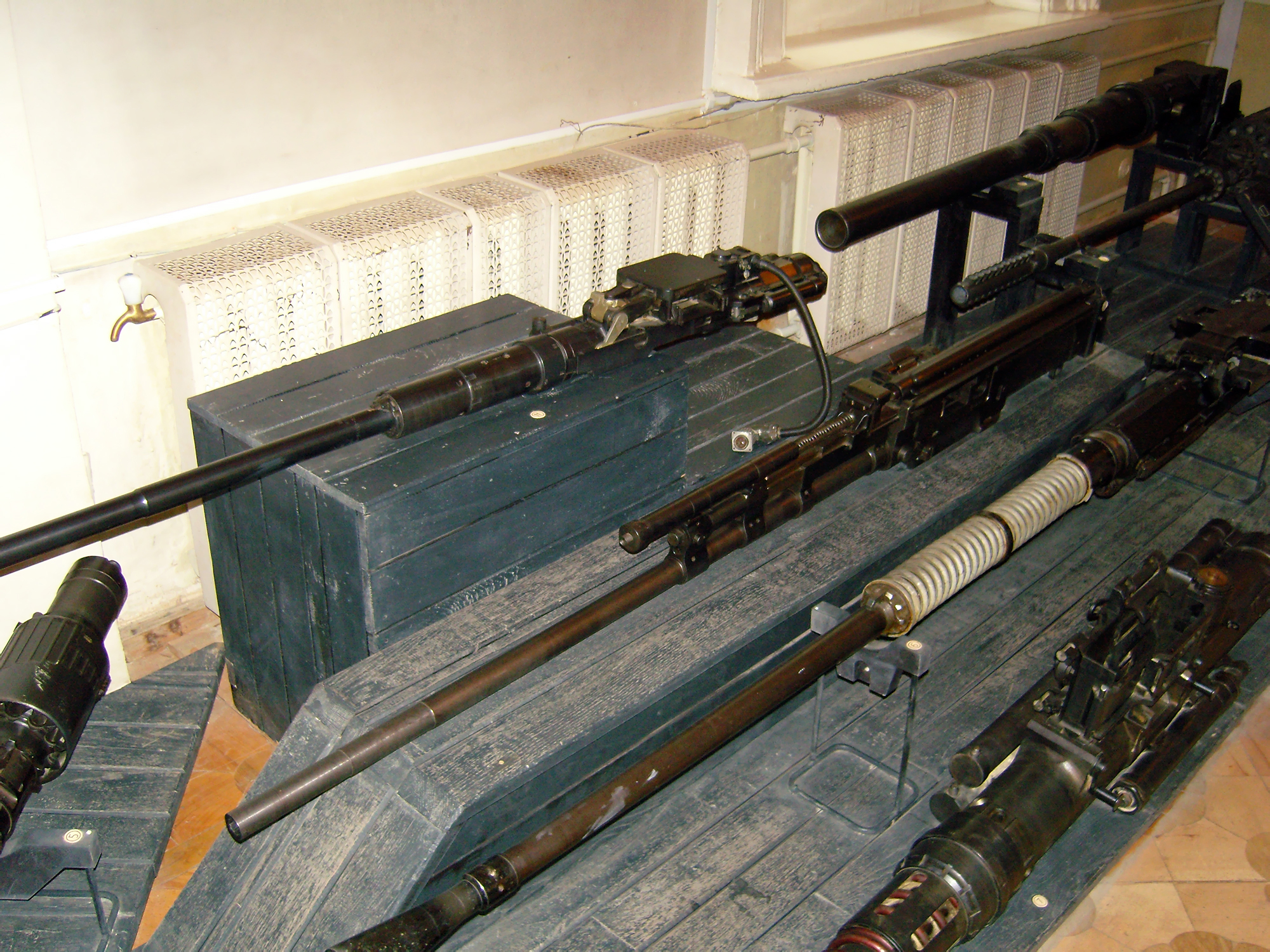
- Second from the top in the middle
- Type: Autocannon
- Place of origin: USSR

Service history
- In service: Soviet Air Forces, Soviet Air Defence Forces
- Wars: World War II, Korean War

Production history
- Designer: Mikhail Yevgenyevich Berezin
- Designed: 1944

Specifications
- Mass: 25 kg (55 lb)
- Length: 2,035 mm (80.1 in)
- Barrel length: 1,588 mm (62.5 in)
- Cartridge: 20×99mmR
- Caliber: 20 mm (0.8 in)
- Barrels: 1
- Action: Gas
- Rate of fire: 800 rounds/min (600 synchronized)
- Muzzle velocity: 790–815 m/s (2,590–2,670 ft/s)

The Berezin B-20 (Березин Б-20) was a 20 mm caliber autocannon used by Soviet aircraft in World War II.

== Development ==
The B-20 was created by Mikhail Yevgenyevich Berezin in 1944 by converting his 12.7 mm Berezin UB machine gun to use the 20 mm rounds used by the ShVAK cannon. No other changes were made to the weapon which was pneumatically or mechanically charged and was available in both synchronized and unsynchronized versions. In 1946, an electrically-fired version was created for the turrets of the Tupolev Tu-4 bomber until the Nudelman-Rikhter NR-23 cannon became available. The B-20 was a welcome replacement for the ShVAK because it was significantly lighter - 25 kg (55 lb) to the 40 kg (80 lb) ShVAK - without sacrificing rate of fire or muzzle velocity.

== Specifications ==
- Ammunition: 20×99mm
- Empty weight: 25 kg (55 lbs)
- Muzzle velocity: 750–770 m/s (2,460-2,525 ft/s)
- Rate of fire: 800 rounds/min (600 synchronized)
- One-second burst-mass: Unsynchronized, 1.27 kg (2.8 lbs); Synchronized, 0.95 kg (2.1 lbs)

== Production ==
The Soviet archives register the following production numbers by year:

- 1944 — 2,275
- 1945 — 7,240
- 1946 — 440
- 1947 — 780
- 1948 — 1,686
- 1949 — 2,931

== See also ==
- List of Russian weaponry

Related developments:

- Berezin UB machine gun

Similar weapons:

- ShVAK cannon
- MG FF cannon
- MG 151 cannon
- Ho-5 cannon
- Hispano HS.404 cannon
