= ShKAS machine gun =

Soviet aircraft machine gun

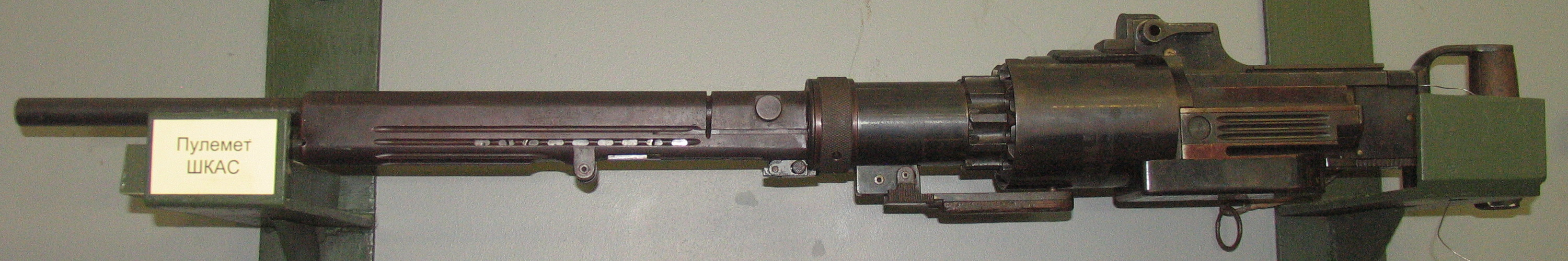
- A ShKAS at the Zadorozhny Equipment Museum
- Type: Aircraft machine gun
- Place of origin: Soviet Union

Service history
- Used by: See Users
- Wars: World War II; Spanish Civil War; Second Sino-Japanese War

Production history
- Designer: Boris Shpitalniy; Irinarkh Komaritsky
- Designed: 1932
- Produced: 1933–1945
- No. built: ~150,000

Specifications
- Mass: 9.8 kg (21.6 lb) (wing-mounted); 10.6 kg (23.4 lb) (flexible); 11.1 kg (24.5 lb) (synchronized); 10.2 kg (22.5 lb) (1941 model, wing-mounted)
- Length: 935 mm (36.8 in) (wing-mounted); 955 mm (37.6 in) (flexible role); 1,077–1,097 mm (42.4–43.2 in) (synchronized); 1,005 mm (39.6 in) (1941 model)
- Barrel length: 605 mm (23.8 in) (wing and flexible); 750 mm (29.5 in) (synchronized); 675 mm (26.6 in) (1941 model)
- Cartridge: 7.62×54mmR
- Caliber: 7.62 mm
- Action: Gas with rotary feeding mechanism
- Rate of fire: 1800 RPM (ShKAS); 1650 RPM (synchronized); 3000 RPM (UltraShKAS)
- Muzzle velocity: 775–825 m/s (2,540–2,710 ft/s)
- Feed system: Belt-fed
- Sights: Iron sights

The ShKAS (Shpitalny-Komaritski Aviatsionny Skorostrelny, Shpitalny-Komaritski rapid fire for aircraft; Russian: ШКАС - Шпитального-Комарицкого Авиационный Скорострельный) is a 7.62 mm calibre machine gun widely used by Soviet aircraft in the 1930s and during World War II. The ShKAS had the highest rate of fire of any aircraft machine gun in general service during WWII, around 1800 RPM. It was designed by Boris Shpitalniy and Irinarkh Komaritsky and entered production in 1934. ShKAS was used in the majority of Soviet fighters and bombers and served as the basis for the ShVAK cannon.

== Description ==
ShKAS is a gas-operated aircraft machine gun; it has a single chamber in which the pin strikes the primer.

A key element of the ShKAS' high rate of fire is the revolving drum (feed cage) that holds ten rounds and provides a very smooth, progressive removal of the cartridges from their disintegrating link belt.

The bolt locking action is Browning-style, i.e. slightly tilted wedge bolt.

The bolt action mechanism is the "gas piston in a tube - rod - bolt frame", rather similar to Kalashnikov's assault rifle.

The main difference with AK is that, with AK, the whole assembly of piston-rod-bolt frame is a single large and heavy part. And, with ShKAS, it is split to several parts - the piston, the rod and the bolt frame, with a "personal" recoil spring for each of them (the weapon has a lot of springs in it).

This provided for the lightweight recoiling portion of the gun, which weighs only 921 grams (2.07 lb).

Diagram of the ShKAS feed system operation.

A declassified US analysis of the feed system, based on models captured during the Korean War, reads:

An interesting departure was made from the heretofore orthodox practice of feeding ammunition to a gun of this caliber. The feed, somewhat resembling a grooved revolver cylinder, is an integral part of the gun, and the cartridges remain axial throughout the entire operation.

The cylindrical feed cage is rotated by an arm that engages a slot in the gas piston. A helical groove in the drum arrangement withdraws the cartridges from the metal disintegrating link belt as it moves through the feedway by engaging their rims and gradually camming the cartridges rearward. The freed cartridges are then presented at the bottom of the receiver for chambering by final rotation.

This circular type of feed holds ten rounds. Several phases are required to completely delink a round and roll it up into position for being shoved into the chamber. A small folding handle held on the top side is used to rotate the feed drum when filling with cartridges.

Camming the round slowly out of the belt with this type of feeder causes practically no drag when the weapon is fired at high speed. It has belt pull enough to take care of practically any length belt desired. [...]

The Russian Air Force nicknamed this circular arrangement the "bird-cage" feed. It is an adaptation of a system first used by the Polish designer, Gabriel Szakats.

(Ian V. Hogg called the ShKAS feeding system a "squirrel cage".)

After analysing the less unusual parts of the ShKAS, the US source concludes:

Thus the Shkas is an innovation based on the features of the Maxim (ejection and buffer), the Szakats (rotating feed), and the Berthier (piston-actuated, propped breech, locking.)

Although ShKAS is best known for its high rate of fire, it did have provision for slower cyclic rates by lowering the gas-pressure. This was done by "changing the position of the holes in the gas regulator, which comes with holes of three different sizes: 2.1 mm (1/12-inch), 2.5 mm (1/10-inch) and 3.2 mm (1/8-inch). The smaller the orifice used, the more moderate is the rate of fire obtained."

== Variants ==
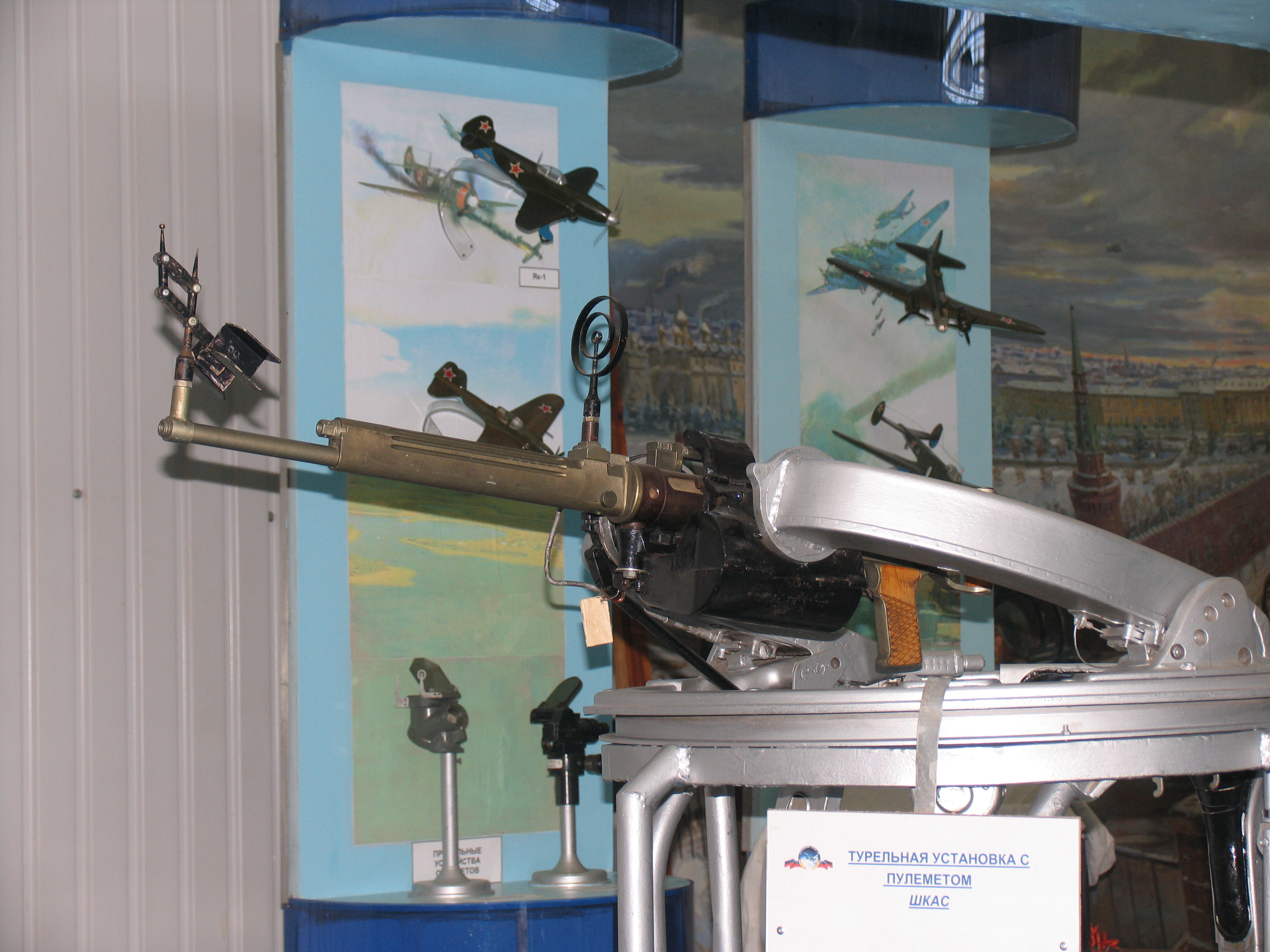
ShKAS in a ring mount

Initial production consisted of cable-charged wing-mounted and turret-mounted ShKAS with a synchronized version entering service in 1936.

By 1952 Western intelligence had identified five different models, all including the number "426" in their markings:

- a prototype "426" appeared in 1932
- KM-33, in flexible role, appeared in 1933
- KM-35, in flexible role (1934) and wing-mounted (1935)
- KM-36, in flexible role (1935) and propeller-synchronized (1937); the latter had an extra-long barrel
- a 1941 model, wing-mounted

"KM" stands for "constructed model", i.e. production. The intended role was marked with the letters "T" for flexible, "K" for wing, and "S" synchronized. The flexible version was usually mounted in a Soviet copy of the Scarff ring. The 1937 model had slightly higher maximum rate of fire of 2,000 rounds per minute. The amount of ammunition normally carried was 750 rounds for the fixed models and 1,000 to 1,500 for the flexible.

Soviet archives indicate the following production volumes, by year:

- 1933 — 365 produced
- 1934 — 2,476
- 1935 — 3,566
- 1937 — 13,005
- 1938 — 19,687
- 1940 — 34,233
- 1943 — 29,450
- 1944 — 36,255
- 1945 — 12,455

In 1939, a small number of Ultra-ShKAS were produced featuring a firing rate of 3,000 rounds per minute but these saw only limited use due to reliability problems.

== Effectiveness ==
The ShKAS was the fastest-firing rifle calibre aircraft armament in general service in World War II. A one-second burst from the four ShKAS of a Polikarpov I-153 or Polikarpov I-16 placed 120 bullets within 15 angular mils at 400 meters (1,312 feet) giving a firing density of 5 bullets per square meter of the sky. Moreover, the ShKAS was unusually light as well; the four guns, with 650 rounds of ammunition each, weighed a total of only 160 kg (350 lb). ShKAS wasn't problem-free though. Soviet machine-gun technician Viktor M. Sinaisky recalled:

The ShKAS machine gun had a high rate of fire but it also had 48 ways of jamming. Some of them could be fixed immediately, some could not. And 1,800 rounds a minute was an insanely high rate of fire. If you pulled the trigger too long, the ShKAS would fire all its ammo in one go and that would be it!!

== Gun specifications ==
- Cartridge: 7.62×54mmR
- Calibre: 7.62 mm (0.300 in)
- Rate of fire: 1,800 rounds/min wing- or turret-mounted; 1,625 rounds/min synchronized. UltraShKAS: 3,000 rounds/min.
- Muzzle velocity: 825 m/s (2,710 ft/s)
- Weight: 10 kg (22 lb) empty; 40 kg (88 lb) with 650 rounds of ammunition.

== 7.62 mm ammunition specifications ==
Although chambered in the 7.62×54mmR, the ShKAS guns used cartridges specially built for them to smaller tolerances; to distinguish them from the regular 7.62 ammunition, the Cyrillic letter "Sh" (Ш) was imprinted on the bottom of the cases. The cases, designed by N. M. Elizarov, also had a few additional features like double crimping and a thicker case wall of "bimetallic" construction instead of the traditional brass. The main type of bullet used was armour-piercing incendiary B-32 bullet. Ammunition marked as such should not be fired out of any regular 7.62×54mmR rifles.

- Bullet weight: 148 grains (9.6 grams)
- Round weight: 370 grains (24 grams)
- Ballistic coefficient: 2,100 kg/m^{2} (3.0 lb/in^{2})
- Tracer ammunition duration: 750 m (2,460 ft)
- Armour piercing: 11 mm (0.43 in) at 400 m (1,312 ft)

== Possible influences ==
Some military historians believe the feed system of the Mauser 213C (the seminal revolver cannon for Western designs) was inspired by the ShKAS. However, the method of operation is very different: gas-operation on the ShKAS versus a revolving cam on the MG 213C.

== Users ==
- Soviet Union
- (Spain) Second Spanish Republic
- Republic of China
- Yugoslavia

== See also ==
- MG 81 machine gun
- Savin-Narov machine gun
- SIBEMAS machine gun
- Vickers K machine gun
- Revolver cannon
- List of firearms
- List of Russian weaponry
- List of common World War II weapons
