= Muravey =

Muravey may refer to:

== People ==
- Muravey Radev

== Places ==
- Muravey, Altai Krai
- Muravey, Bashkortostan

== Other ==
- Muravey-class patrol boat
- Muravey (scooter)
- Muravey VTS
