= 287 (disambiguation) =

287 may refer to:

- 287 (year)
- 287 (number)
- Obiekt 287
- NGC 287
- UFC 287
