= 9K112 Kobra =

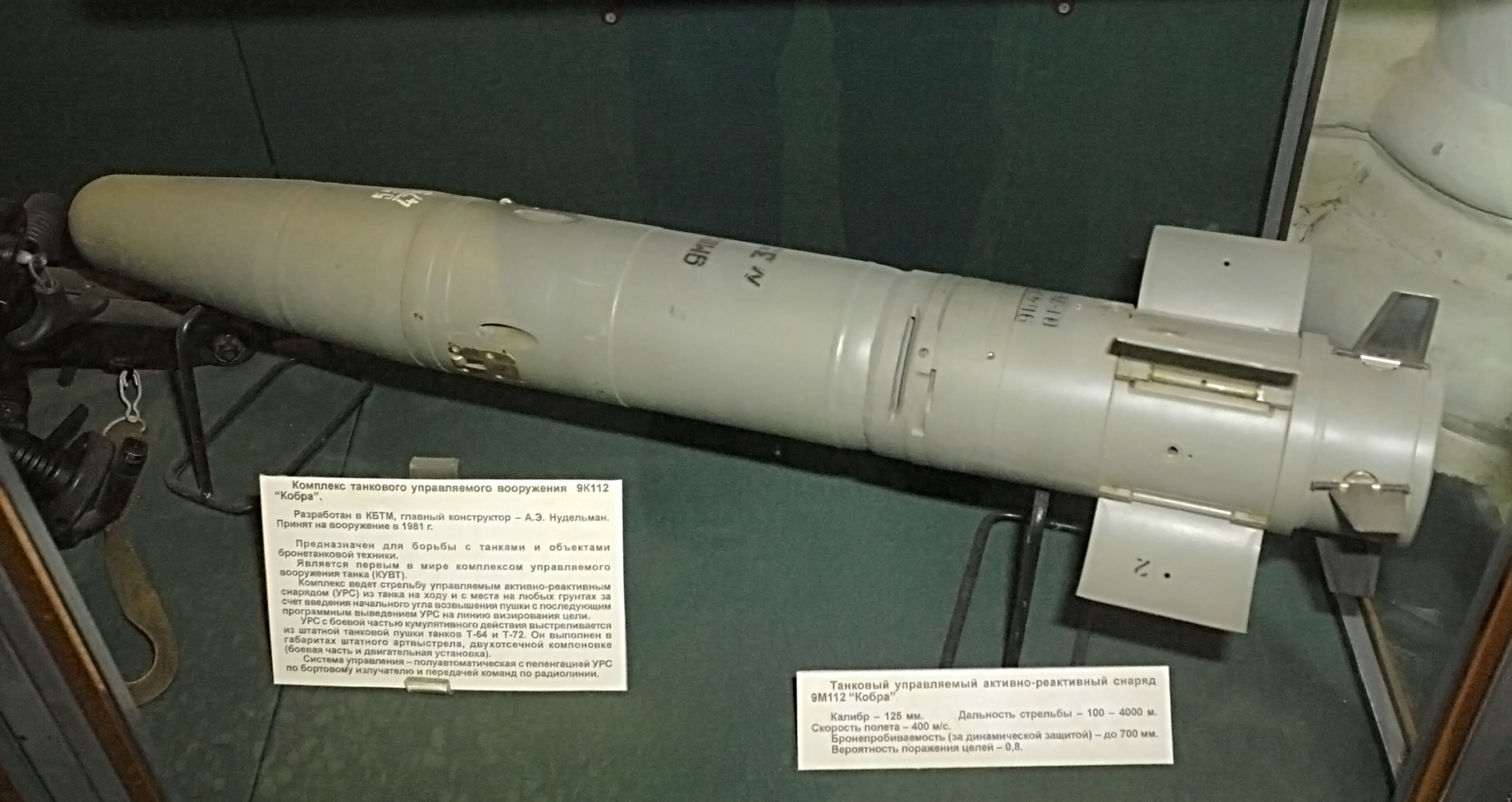
- A 125 mm calibre 9K112 "Kobra" anti-tank round. From the collection of the Military Historical Museum of Artillery, Engineer & Signal Corps - St. Petersburg, Russia.
- Type: Anti-tank missile
- Place of origin: Soviet Union

Service history
- In service: 1976–present
- Used by: Soviet Union

Production history
- Designer: KB Tochmash
- Designed: 1970s
- Produced: 1975–1979 (9M112), 1979–1984 (9M112M)
- Variants: 9M112M, 9M112M2, 9M124

Specifications
- Mass: 23.2 kg
- Effective firing range: 100–4,000 meters
- Warhead weight: 4.5 kg
- Guidance system: SACLOS radio

The 9K112 Kobra (NATO reporting name: AT-8 Songster) is a SACLOS anti-tank missile system of the Soviet Union. It is fired from the 125 mm main guns of the T-64 and T-80 series of tanks. A newer design based on the same concept is the 9M119 (NATO reporting name AT-11 Sniper).

== Development ==
The first generation of Soviet missile tanks started in 1956 when V.A. Malyshev was ordered by Nikita Khrushchev to instill a "new thinking" into the weapons design bureaus. Part of this "new thinking" was the development of missile tanks, including the IT-1 firing the Drakon missile and the Taifun-armed Obiekt 297. However, these early tank designs were failures. A purely missile armed tank had a 300-metre deadzone around it, where it could not engage targets—also the size of the early missiles limited the number carried. Hybrid designs compromised both main gun firepower and missile carrying capacity.

These limitations led to the development of a hybrid system, where the missile was fired through the barrel of the tank's main cannon. The first generation of this concept was the Obiekt 775 tank, armed with a 125 mm smoothbore gun that could fire high explosive unguided rockets, or a radio command guided projectile. The guided projectile was called Rubin (Ruby) and the unguided projectile called Bur (Drill). The tank could carry 24 Rubin missiles and 48 Bur rockets. The project was a failure, as the Rubin's shaped charge warhead was not effective enough, and there were concerns that the missile's command link could be jammed.

Development continued during the 1960s, but it was not until the 1970s that serious attention was paid to the concept again. This was probably because of three factors:

- The United States' development of a 152 mm gun missile system for the M551 Sheridan and M60A2 tanks
- The development of NATO anti-tank missiles such as the TOW and Euromissile HOT systems, which had better accuracy at long range than contemporary tank guns.
- The increased threat of helicopters, such as the AH-1 Cobra. Missiles could offer a degree of protection against treetop-hovering helicopters.

The development of a second generation of Soviet tube-fired guided projectiles began in the 1970s. The Kobra missile system was in competition with the IR-guided Gyurza system. The IR guidance system of the Gyurza missile proved troublesome and the Kobra was put into production. The 9K112 was first mounted on a new version of the T-64B in 1976. The later T-80B, in 1978, was also armed with this system. The Gyurza system continued to be developed, dropping the IR guidance system in favour of radio command guidance - it was then developed into the Shturm or AT-6 Spiral.

== Description ==
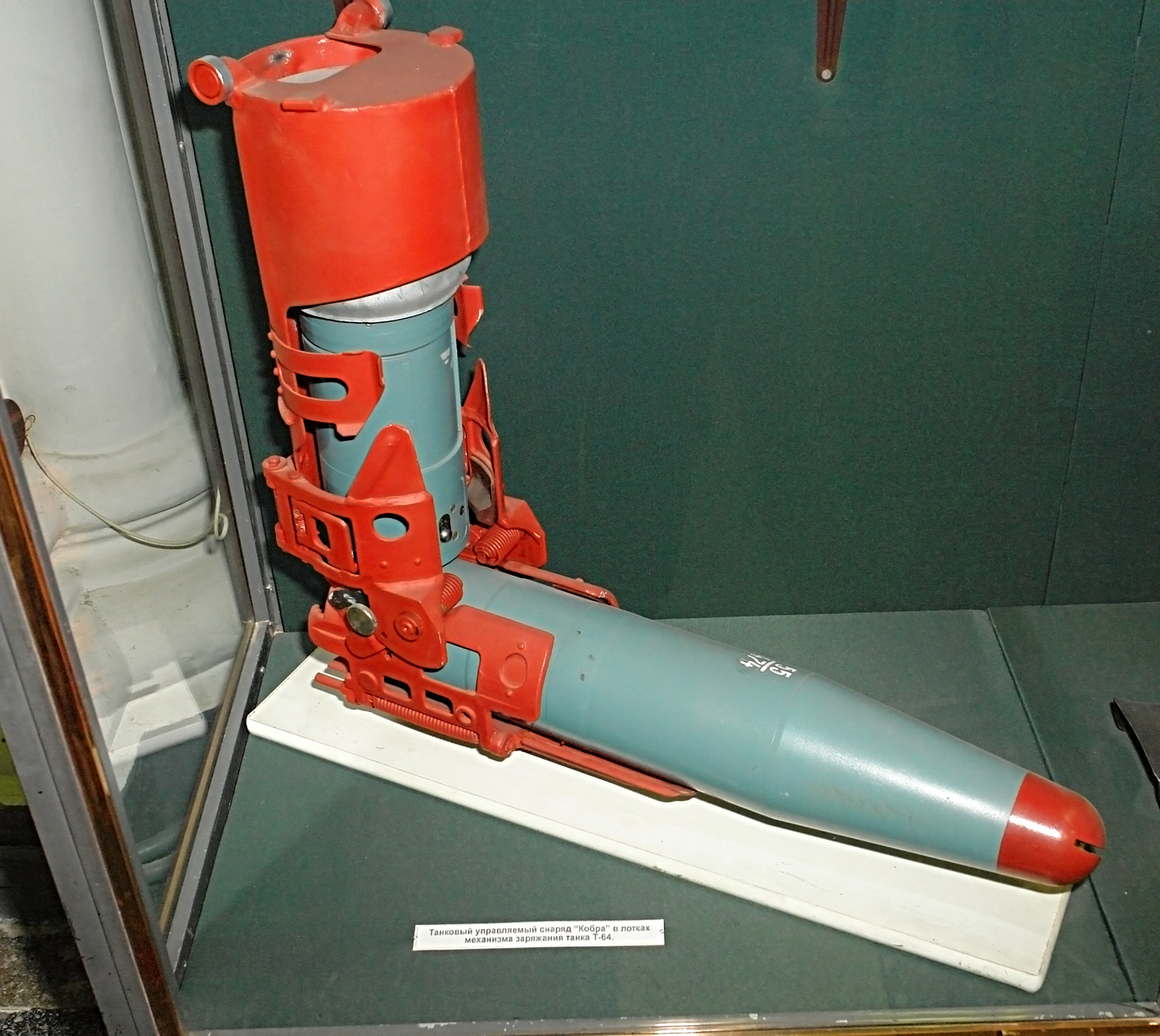
The two sections of the missile in a loading chute prior to being joined

The 9M112 Kobra missile consists of two sections:

- 9M43 head section – containing the 9M129 shaped charge warhead and the 9D129 sustainer motor
- 9B447 tail section – containing a battery, the flight controls, a light source for the guidance system on the tank to track and a small antenna to receive commands from the tank

The two separate sections are stored in the autoloader of the tank in the same way as conventional 125 mm rounds. As the round is hoisted into the gun the two halves are mated together.

The missile can be fired in any of three modes:

- Primary mode – the gun is elevated three degrees above the line of sight to reduce the amount of dust generated by the missile launch. This is critical since the tank has to see both the target and the light source on the rear of the missile in order to be able to guide the missile to the target. The missile system uses SACLOS guidance, the gunner has to keep the crosshairs centered on the target and the 1A33 fire control system generates course corrections, which are broadcast to the missile. Accuracy at 4000 m is estimated to be 80% in this mode.
- Ballistic mode – the gun is elevated three degrees above the line of sight. The missile then flies three to five meters above the gunner's line of sight, dropping down to the line of sight just before reaching the target. This further reduces the amount of dust kicked up by the flight of the missile, reducing the chance of the guidance system losing the missile.
- Emergency mode – this mode is only for use when a target suddenly appears within 1000 m and the missile is already loaded. The gun is at only 40 minutes of arc above the line of sight to the target, and the command link is activated early. The hit probability is lower in this mode.

The missile has a muzzle velocity of 125 m/s, this increases to 800 m/s at its peak, but averages out at 350 to 400 meters a second. The flight time to 4000 meters is 9 to 10 seconds. The missile has a single 4.5 kg HEAT warhead, which can penetrate 600 mm of RHA.

== Variants ==
- 9M112 – basic version of the missile, entered service in 1976 as part of the 9K112 missile system in the T-64B
- 9M112M – upgraded modification tested in 1977 and adopted in 1978 as part of the 9K112-1 missile system in the T-80B, armour penetration increased by 20%. Production started in 1979.
- 9M112M2 – 9M112 variant with armour penetration increased by 40% compared with the initial model, testing started in 1983. The missile's dimensions and operating conditions remained unchanged.
- 9M124 – variant of the 9M112M2, similar in design, but has a more powerful warhead (armour penetration increased by 80% relative to the base variant of the missile)
- 9M128 – upgraded missile system called "Agona" with a tandem warhead; development started in 1984 but, in 1985, the Svir and Refleks missile systems entered service in place of "Agona". Nevertheless, in 1986, "Agona" entered the state tests, and in 1988 it was put into service.

== Operators ==
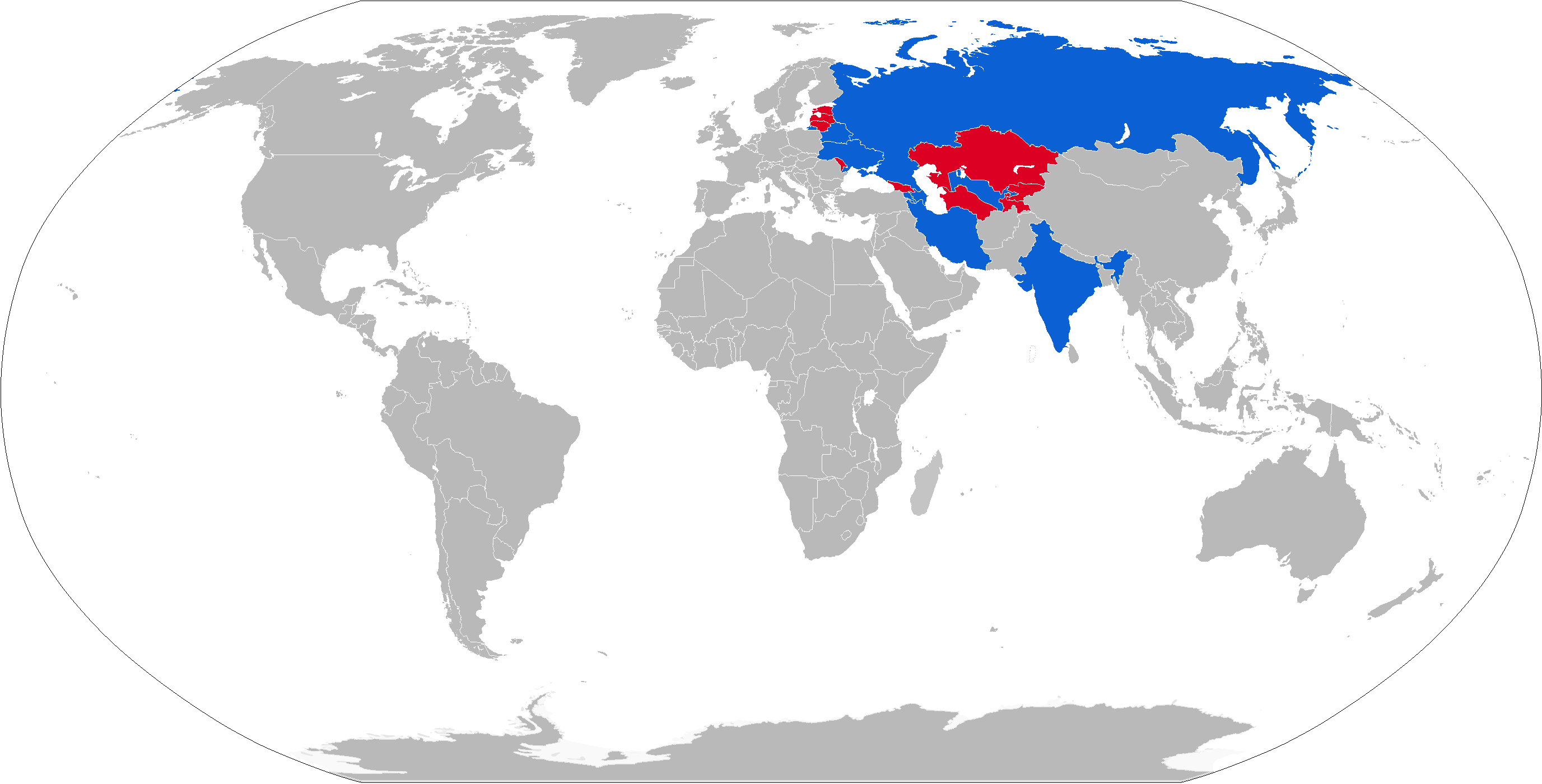
Operators Current Former

=== Current operators ===
- Armenia
- Azerbaijan
- Belarus
- India
- Russia
- Ukraine
- Uzbekistan
- Poland

=== Former operators ===
- Soviet Union: Passed on to successor states.

== See also ==
- List of gun-launched missiles
