= 9M337 Sosna-R =

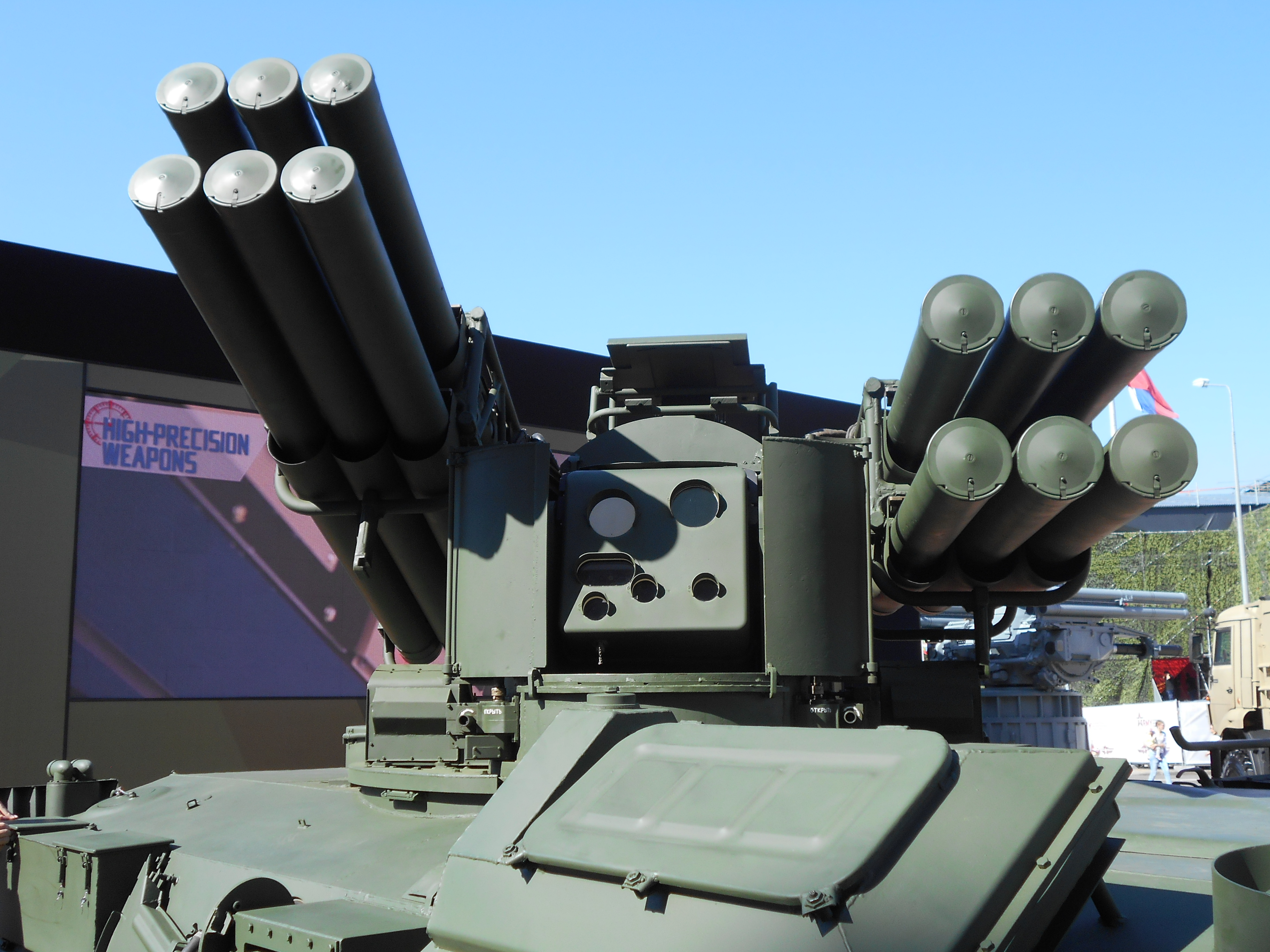
- Sosna surface-to-air missile system.
- Type: Surface to air missile
- Place of origin: Russian Federation

Service history
- In service: May 2019
- Used by: Russian Federation

Production history
- Designed: 2017
- Manufacturer: High Precision Systems
- Produced: 2022
- Variants: See variants

Specifications
- Warhead: 1× Fragmented-rod warhead 1× AP-Frag warhead
- Detonation mechanism: Combined impact/proximity laser fuze
- Operational range: 10 km
- Flight altitude: 5 km
- Maximum speed: Mach 2.6
- Guidance system: Laser guidance Radio guidance
- Launch platform: Sosna vehicle Ptitselov vehicle Palma CIWS; Palash CIWS

The 9M337 Sosna-R (Pine) (SA-X-25) is a Russian radar and laser-guided supersonic (Mach 2.6) two-stage missile. It is used in Sosna-R short range air defense missile system designed to protect military units from air attacks in all types of combat situations, including during march.

In 2017, official tests of the newest air defense missile system Bagulnik (domestic variant which is currently named Strela-10ML) were successfully completed.

== Description ==
It was developed by KB Tochmash as a successor to 9K35 Strela-10, and is a cheaper alternative to the Tor missile system and Pantsir-S1. Designed to work in passive mode with the help of different imaging systems (thermal camera, TV camera) and a laser rangefinder in order to find and engage a target, Sosna-R is able to operate effectively under the control of various types of old, modern and prospective battery command posts, the most preferable of which is the FPU "Assembly-M1-2" (9S80M1-2) and is resistant to jamming. It uses a tracked SAM launcher with 12 missiles of 10 km range and altitude of 5 km, based on the MT-LB vehicle. Those 12 missiles can be reloaded in 12 minutes. The serial production version is based on the BMP-3 IFV. The Sosna can also deliver fire while on the move. The system has a crew of two: the driver and gunner.

The system is armed with 12 9M340 missiles that are held in their transport-launch containers and arranged in two banks of six. Sosna-R beam rider 38 kg missiles are two-stage, capable of destroying aircraft, helicopters, cruise missiles, aerial bombs, small-sized air attack weapons including elements of high-precision weapons and light armored vehicles. The missile can change direction mid-flight. It also has a combined impact/proximity laser fuze. Its payload is made up of two warheads weighing a total of 7 kg. The fragmented-rod warhead is designed for proximity detonation when flying close to the target, while the armor-piercing/fragmentation (AP-Frag) warhead goes off on impact. The system has high resistance to jamming and besides its passive mode of operation it can be equipped with an additional small-size acquisition radar.

The Palma anti-aircraft artillery system features integrated armament that comprises eight Sosna-R precision surface-to-air missiles with laser beam guidance and two AO-18KDE rapid-fire guns. As a defense component, the Palma is designated to defend both ships and naval bases, coastal infrastructure and aerodromes, and also other vital facilities.

== Range ==
Within 8–10 (≤ 20) km.

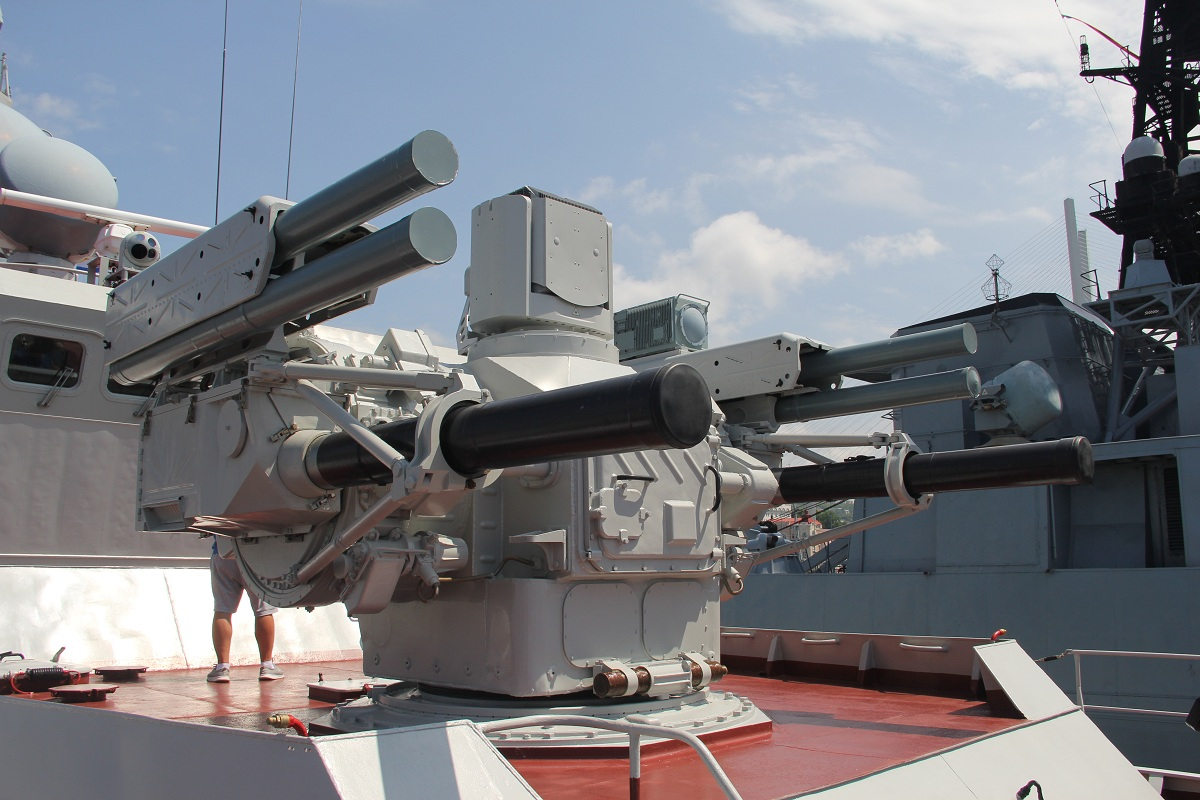
The Palma-SU CIWS on Vietnamese Gepard 3.9 frigates using Sosna-R missiles.

== Variants ==
- Sosna A weapon module for MBT, IFV, APC, AFV
- Sosna RA for AFV, MBT, IFV, APC
- Palash CIWS
- Palma CIWS - the deliveries of the systems to the Russian Navy and foreign navies started in 2011.
- Ptitselov CIWS is an air transportable version based on the BMD-4M chassis and it can also be dropped by parachute

== Operators ==
=== Current operators ===
Russia
Vietnam

- Palma-SU CIWS used on Gepard 3.9 frigates.

=== Potential operator ===
Egypt

- Potential Palma CIWS acquisition reported.

== See also ==
- Hermes (missile)
