= Obiekt 287 =

1965 experimental Soviet missile tank

Object 287
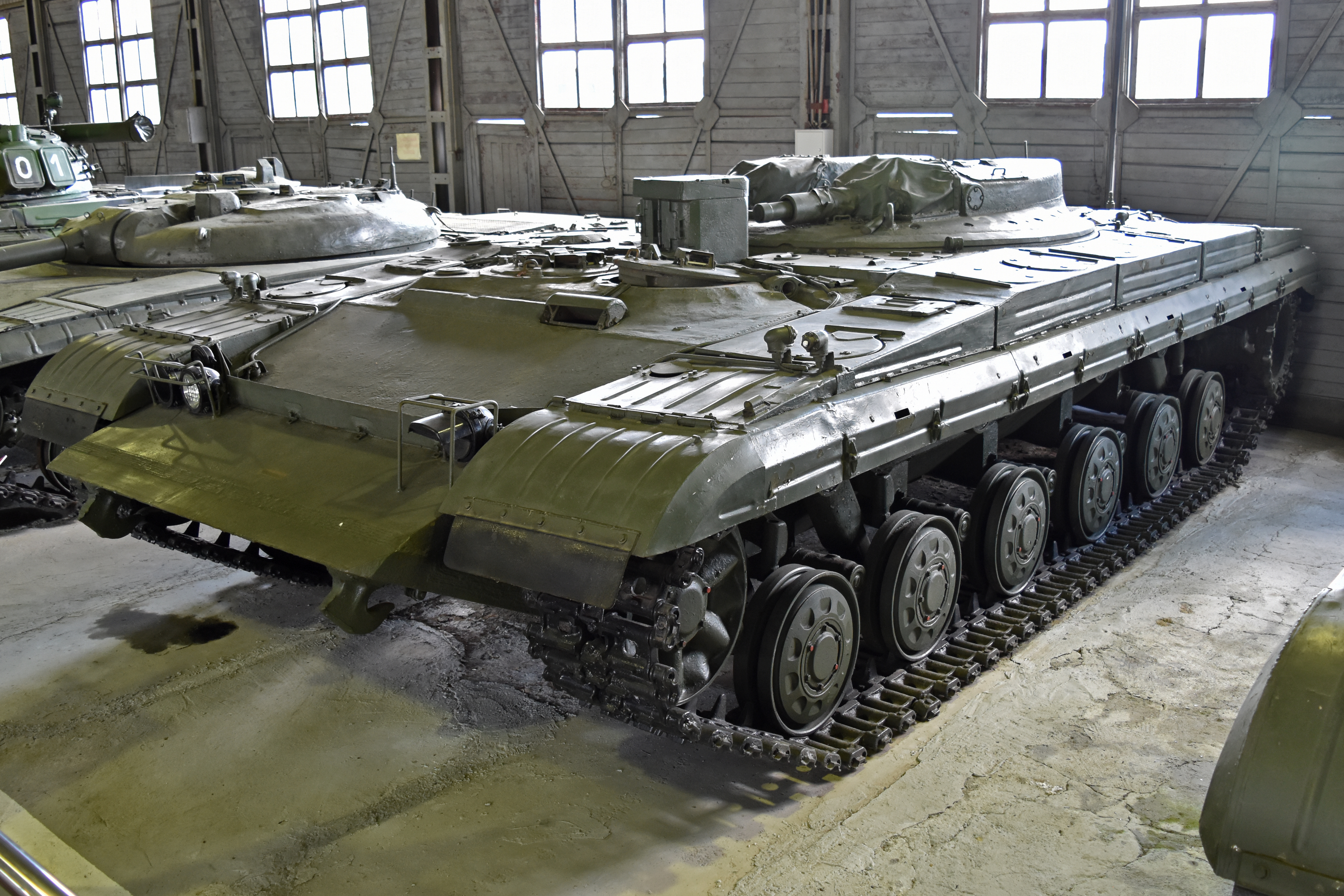
- Type: Missile tank / tank destroyer
- Place of origin: Soviet Union

Production history
- Designer: LKZ
- Manufacturer: LKZ
- Produced: 1965

Specifications
- Mass: 36.5 tonnes
- Length: 6.12 m
- Width: 3.42 m
- Height: 1.75 m
- Crew: 2
- Main armament: 2×73 mm 2A25 “Molniya” 2× 7.62 mm PKT
- Secondary armament: 15× ATGM Taifun 9M15
- Engine: 5TDF supercharged diesel: Maximum power: 515 kW (700 hp) at 3000 rpm; Maximum torque: 1925 Nm at 2000 rpm
- Suspension: torsion bar
- Ground clearance: 450 mm
- Maximum speed: 66 km/h

The Obiekt 287 or Object 287 (Russian: Объект 287) was an experimental Soviet missile tank. It was created in 1965 under the leadership of Josef Kotin at the Leningrad Kirov Plant (LKZ). Created on the basis of the Object 432 chassis. It was not accepted into service. It was further developed into the Object 288.

== History ==
In 1961 IT-1 was still in development and the project was not progressing well. This shortcoming is likely why the Kirov plant in Leningrad, led by Josef Kotin, developed a design of their own, the a prototype called Object 287. The project was officially launched by the decision of the Soviet Council of Ministers in the February of 1961.

== Description ==
Object 287 was a classic missile tank, lacking a tank cannon. Object 287's main weapon was anti-tank guided missiles. Compared to all previous projects, this tank had many design and technological innovations.

There was no turret in Object 287 - instead, a rotating platform was mounted on the roof of the hull, in the middle part of which there was a hatch for extending the missile launcher. In traveling mode, this installation was placed inside the tank hull, and during the battle it was pulled out for firing. To the right and left of the hatch cover, one armored cap was welded to accommodate in each of them a 73-mm semi-automatic smoothbore 2A25 Molniya gun and a coaxial PKT machine gun.

Object 287 was armed with Taifun 9M15 anti-tank guided missiles, which were manually aimed at the target using radio commands. The missiles had a caliber of 140 mm and a flight speed of 250 m/sec. The armor penetration of the combat fragmentation-cumulative part of the rocket was 500 mm, and its fragmentation effect was equivalent to that of a 100-mm high-explosive fragmentation projectile.

The missile launcher in the combat position was stabilized in two planes, its horizontal guidance angle was 200 degrees. The launcher's ammunition consisted of 15 missiles, which were placed in an automatic feed mechanism. The firing range varied from 500 meters to 4 kilometers. Guided missiles could be launched both on the move and from a standstill with the tank engine running.

Two 73-mm automatic smoothbore guns 2A25 "Molniya" had a revolver-type loading mechanism with a capacity of 8 shots. The ammunition for the two Molniyas consisted of 32 PG-15V HEAT rounds, penetrating roughly 300mm of steel armor under ideal circumstances.

The tank's armament complex was controlled remotely. The tank was equipped with a panoramic combined unilluminated sight with an independent aiming line and a field of view stabilized in two planes.

The tank's crew consisted of two people - a driver and a commander-operator. They were located in the front part of the tank hull in the control compartment, which was isolated from the fighting compartment by a partition. To the left of the launcher was the driver, and to the right was the commander-operator. To enter and exit the tank, both crew members had separate personal hatches.

The frontal part of the tank hull was represented by a combined armor structure, in which fiberglass was used as a filler. This armor design could protect the tank from armor-piercing shells of 122 mm caliber and from cumulative weapons that had armor penetration up to 600 mm. An anti-radiation lining was installed on the inner surface of the habitable compartment of the hull.

The tank's maximum speed was 66 km/h, and it had equipment for underwater driving. “Object 287” had the same design of the power plant, transmission and chassis as “Object 432”.

== Variants ==
- Object 287: prototype ATGMV
- Object 287M: project with "jet wings"

== Derivatives ==
- Object 288: prototype based on Object 287 with PTRK Lotos and two GTD-350 engines

== Specifications (Object 287) ==
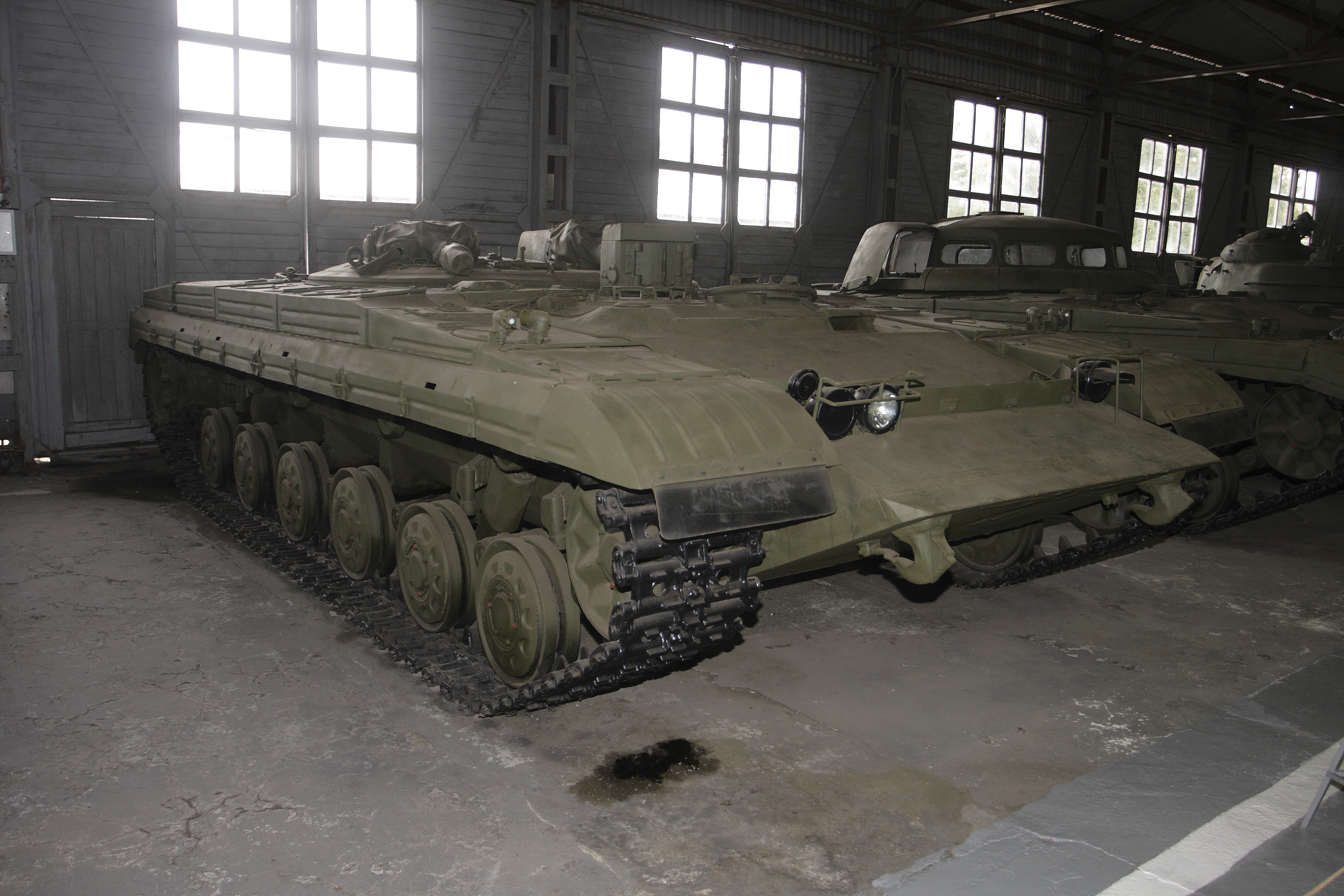
Object 287. Kubinka Tank Museum.

- Combat weight: 36.5 tons
- Length: 6.12 m
- Width: 3.42 m
- Height: 1.75 m
- Ground clearance: 450 mm
- Armor:
1. Front hull: 100 - 200 mm
2. Front turret: 330 mm
- Armament:
1. 140 mm launcher with 15 x 9M15 Taifun missiles
2. 2 x 73 mm Smoothbore guns 32 rounds total
3. 3000 x 7.62 mm
4. Gun type: smoothbore semi-automatic grenade launcher
5. Gun ammunition: 2 x 16
6. Sights: panoramic combined unilluminated
- Engine: 5TDF supercharged diesel engine manufactured by Plant No. 75
1. Maximum power: 515 kW (700 hp) at 3000 rpm
2. Maximum torque: 1925 Nm at 2000 rpm
3. Configuration: in line, 5-cylinder
4. Volume: 13,570 cm³
5. Cylinders: 5
6. Cylinder diameter: 120 mm
7. Piston stroke: 2x120 mm
8. Clock (number of clock cycles): 2
9. Compression ratio: 16.5
10. Recommended fuel: Diesel fuel
11. Cooling: liquid
- Road range: 500 km
- Ground pressure: 0.8 kg/cm²
- Maximum speed: 66 km/h
- Power/weight: 19.18hp/t
- Obstacles:
1. Wall: 0.8 m
2. Trench: 2.7 m
3. Fording: 1.7 m

== In the gaming industry ==
In the MMO game Armored Warfare, the tank is available as a Tier 6 promotional premium vehicle.
