= Aleksandr Nudelman =

Soviet weapon designer and researcher (1912–1996)

- Александр Нудельман
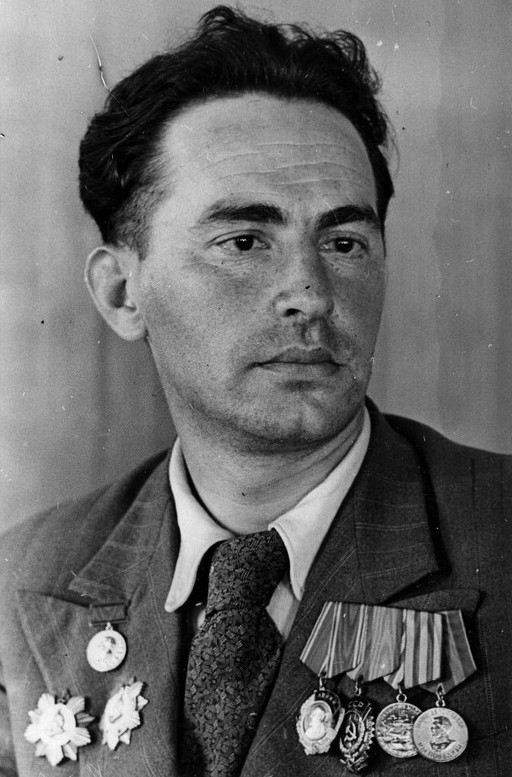
- Born: August 21, 1912; Odessa, Kherson Governorate, Russian Empire
- Died: August 2, 1996 (aged 83); Moscow, Russia

Aleksandr Emmanuilovich Nudelman (Russian: Александр Эммануилович Нудельман; 21 August [O.S. 8 August] 1912 – 2 August 1996) was a Soviet weapon designer and researcher. Numerous weapon systems were created under his direction. Nudelman made special contributions to the development of aircraft-mounted weapons as well as unguided rockets and anti-tank guided missiles. He was awarded the Hero of Socialist Labour twice.

== Life and career ==
Nudelman was born in Odessa to a Jewish model carpenter, Emmanuil Abramovich Nudelman (1877–1945), head of a local mechanical shop, and Ester Isaakovna Nudelman (née Steinman; 1879–1960). After graduating from technical college in 1929, he worked in the designer's office and at the Odessa Industrial Institute, then at the OKB-16 design bureau under Yakov Taubin. He became director and main designer of the OKB in 1942, consultant to the Ministry of Corporate Defense of the USSR in 1987, and research consultant in KB Tochmash in 1991. In 1962, he defended his thesis in which he developed principles of construction of, and design solutions to, a new generation of autocannons.

Nudelman closely worked with Professor Leonid Linnik, head of the laboratory of optical quantum generators of the Filatov Institute of Eye Diseases and Tissue Therapy, where experimental and clinical approbation of the first laser devices of the USSR, developed at OKB-16, took place. With the collaboration, the first medical laser treatment was carried out by Linnik in 1963.

After retiring in 1987, Nudelman continued to work as a consultant to KB Tochmash, becoming a consultant to the Ministry of Corporate Defense of the USSR at that time.

Nudelman worked and lived in Moscow until his death, and was buried with military honours in the Kuntsevo Cemetery.

Some weapons Nudelman designed include the NS-37, NS-23, N-37, NS-45, N-57, NS-76, NR-23, NR-30 autocannons, S-5, S-8, S-25 rockets, the 3M11 Falanga missile and its variants, the 9K112 Kobra, the Strela-1, 9K35 Strela-10, the OK-1 and OK-2 medical lasers, among others.
