= Obiekt 775 =

Soviet-made missile carrier

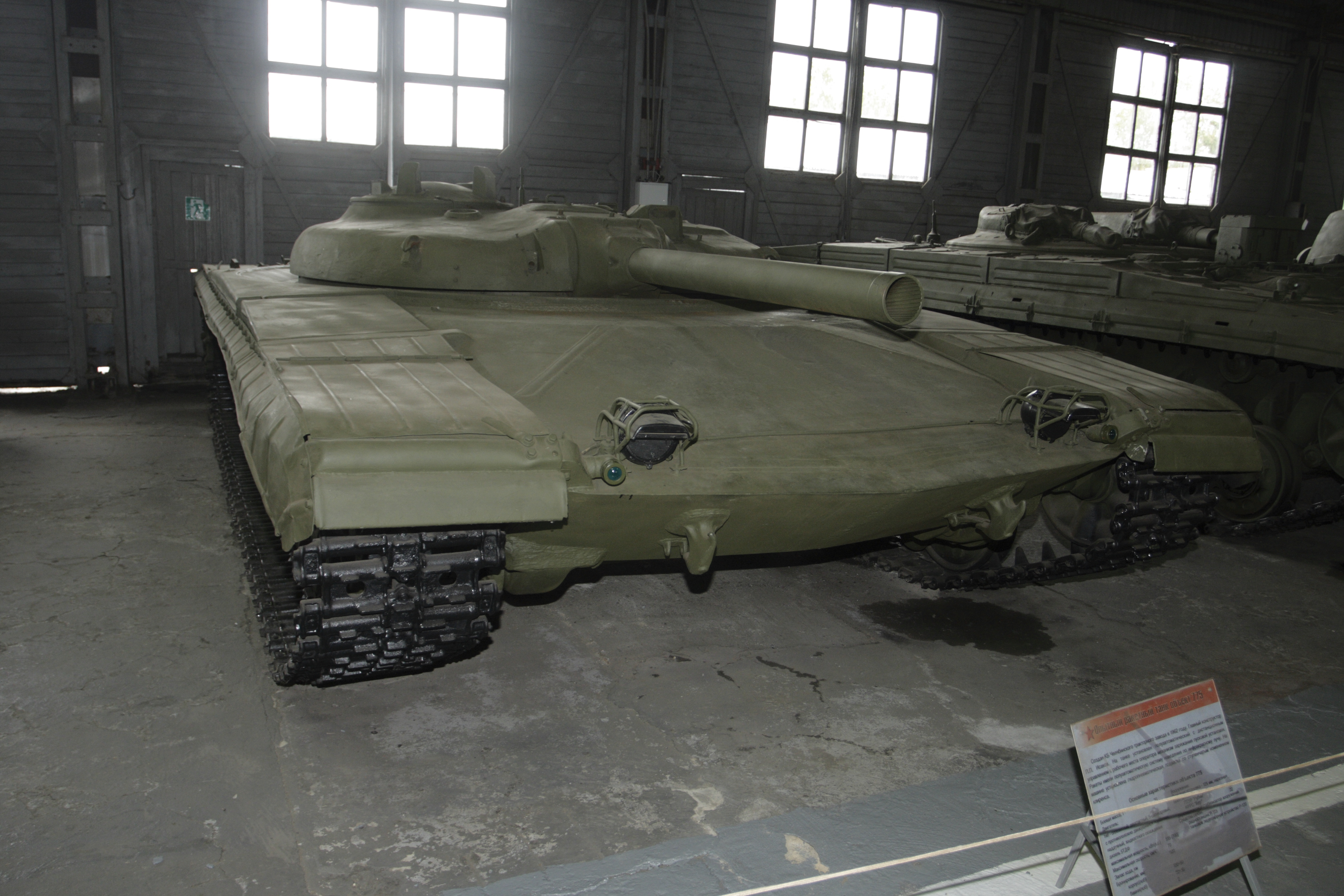
- Object 775 in the Kubinka Tank Museum
- Type: Missile tank
- Place of origin: Soviet Union

Production history
- Designer: P. P. Isakov
- Manufacturer: Chelyabinsk Tractor Plant
- Produced: 1964
- Variants: Obiekt 775; Obiekt 775T

Specifications
- Mass: 36 metric tons
- Length: 6.117 m
- Width: 3.415 m
- Height: 1.8 m
- Crew: 2
- Armour: 120 mm (maximum)
- Main armament: 125 mm D-126 rifled missile launcher (15 "Rubin" / 22 "Bur")
- Secondary armament: 7.62 mm coaxial PKT machine gun
- Engine: 5TDF diesel engine (Object 775); 2x GTD-350 gas turbine engines (Object 775T); 515 kW (Object 775); 2x 350 hp (Object 775T)
- Operational range: 500 km
- Maximum speed: 70 km/h

The Obiekt 775, or Object 775 (Объект 775), was a Soviet experimental missile tank built in 1964.

The tank had an extremely low profile, with a crew of two which sat in an isolated compartment in the turret. The main armament was a 125 mm rifled missile launcher, with a maximum range of 4 km for the "Rubin" anti-tank guided missiles, and 9 km for the "Bur" surface-to-surface missiles. It had a rate of fire of 4-5 rounds/min for the "Rubin", and 8-10 rounds/min for the "Bur". Both munitions were guided by an infra-red beam. The "Rubin" anti-tank missiles were capable of penetrating 250 mm of armor at 60° at a range of 4 km. The tank also featured a hydropneumatic suspension and built-in dozer blade, both of which were uncommon for the time.

The Obiekt 775 used the same engine and transmission from the T-64 tank. The Obiekt 775T (Объект 775Т) variant used two gas turbine engines instead of the diesel engine.

Only two prototypes of the Object 775 missile tank were built in 1964. The tank wasn't adopted for a number of reasons. These included the crew having poor visibility over the battlefield, the overall complexity of the design, and the low reliability of the missile guidance system. The only surviving Object 775 is on display at the Patriot Park in Kubinka near Moscow.

== See also ==
- IT-1
- Object 287
- SU-152 "Taran"
