= N-57/OKB-16-57 =

N-57
- Place of origin: USSR

Production history
- Designer: Alexander Nudelman

Specifications
- Mass: 135 kg
- Shell: 57 x 160 mm
- Caliber: 57 millimetres (2.2 in)
- Barrels: 1
- Action: Gas-operated
- Rate of fire: 230 rpm
- Muzzle velocity: 550 m/s
- Feed system: Belt

The N-57 (also called the OKB-16-57) was a 57 mm Soviet autocannon designed shortly after WWII by Alexander Nudelman, and tested on the prototype of the MiG-9 interceptor (known internally as the I-300) . Due to being a prototype weapon of the early Cold War, not much is known about the N-57 and there is much conflicting data on this weapon.
