= KB Tochmash =

Russian missile design bureau

- Industry: Defense
- Founded: 1934
- Founder: Yakov Taubin
- Headquarters: Moscow, Russia
- Products: Anti-aircraft defence systems, MANPADS, Missiles, Autocannons, Close-in weapon systems (CIWS)
- Parent: High Precision Systems
- Website: www.kbtochmash.ru

The JSC Precision Engineering Design Bureau named after A. E. Nudelman (Russian: Конструкторское бюро точного машиностроения им. А. Э. Нудельмана, romanized: Konstruktorskoye Byuro Tochnogo Mashinostroeniya im. A. E. Nudelmana), shortened to "KB Tochmash" (Russian: КБ Точмаш, romanized: KB Tochmash), is a missile design bureau located in Moscow. It was founded in 1934 under the designation OKB-16 under the leadership of Yakov Taubin, but after his arrest and execution, leadership fell to Alexander Nudelman, who would lead it until 1987.

== Products ==
KB Tochmash has designed many weapon systems, including the following:

Gun systems

- Nudelman-Suranov NS-37 Autocannon
- Nudelman-Suranov NS-23 Autocannon
- Nudelman-Suranov NS-45 Autocannon
- Nudelman N-37 Autocannon
- Nudelman-Rikhter NR-23 Autocannon
- Nudelman-Rikhter NR-30 Autocannon
- Rikhter R-23 Autocannon
- Nudelman-Nemenov NN-30 CIWS
- AGS-17 Automatic Grenade Launcher

Rockets

- S-5
- S-8
- S-25

Anti-tank missiles

- 3M11 Falanga
- 9K112 Kobra

Anti-aircraft missile systems

- SA-9 / 9K31 Strela-1 Self Propelled Air Defense Missile System,
- SA-13 / 9K35 Strela-10 Tracked Air Defense Missile System,
  - 9K35 Strela-10 in modified versions (M/M1/M2/M3 and M4),
- Sosna-R Air Defense Missile System (successor to Strela-10),
- Palma/Palash combined air defense gun and missile system close-in weapon system.

== See also ==
- Techmash
