= Missile tank =

Armored fighting vehicle

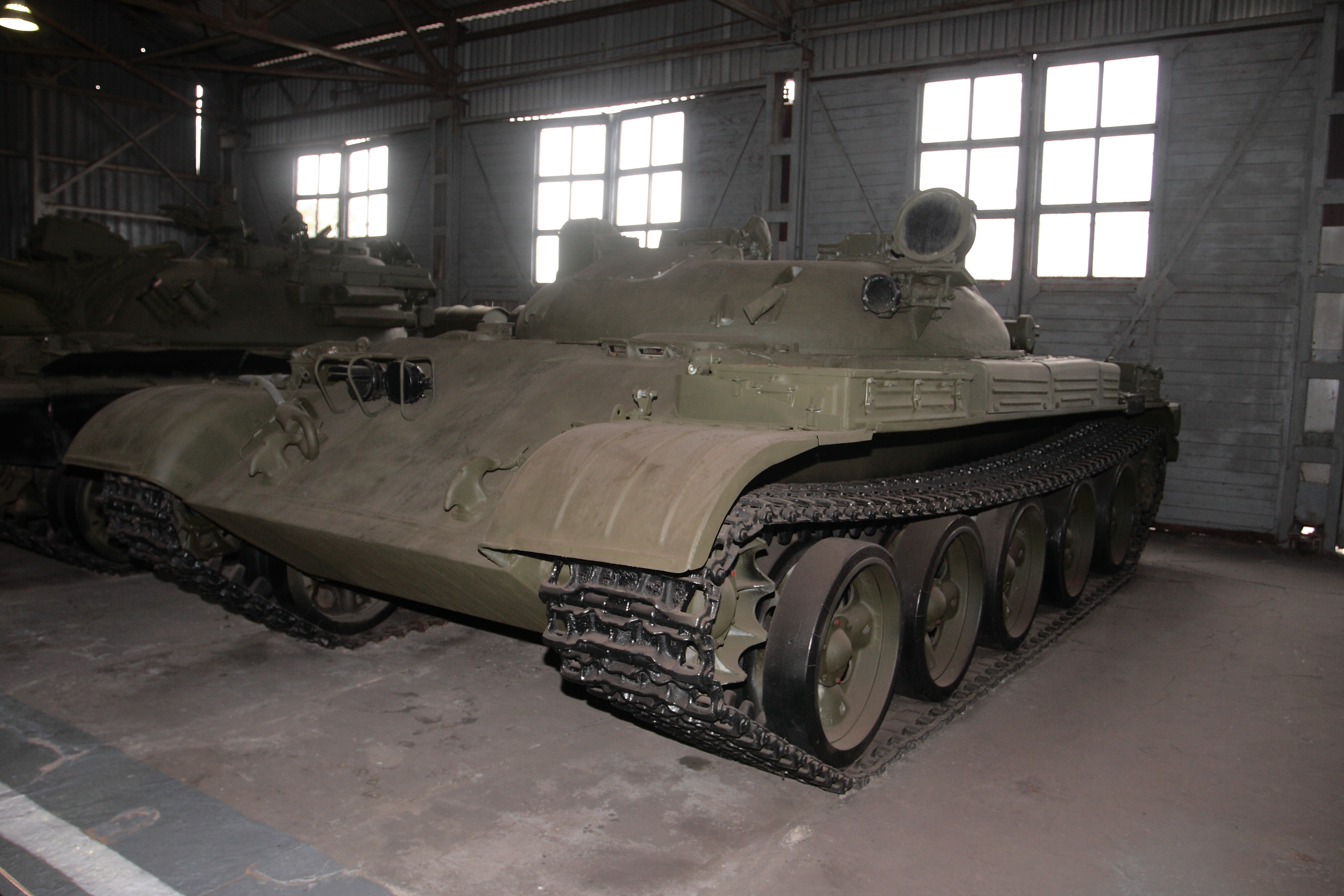
Soviet IT-1, Kubinka Tank Museum

A missile tank is an armoured fighting vehicle fulfilling the role of a main battle tank, but using only guided missiles for main armament. Several nations have experimented with prototypes, notably the Soviet Union during the tenure of Nikita Khrushchev (projects Object 167, Object 137Ml, Object 155Ml, Object 287, Object 775),

The West German Jaguar 2 tank destroyer saw service as a standard vehicle, although the Soviet IT-1 missile-armed tank destroyer also saw limited service.

The term is sometimes applied more loosely to conventional tanks which are able to launch anti-tank guided missiles, to supplement their main gun for very long-range fire. Examples are the U.S.-German prototype MBT-70, the American M60A2, the defunct U.S. M551 Sheridan and French AMX-13, and several Soviet, Russian, and Ukrainian tanks: T-64, T-72, T-80, T-84, T-90 and T-14.

In the 1930s, the Soviet Union tested the RBT-5 rocket-based assault gun, comprising a BT tank mounting two 250-kg "TT Tank Torpedo" unguided rockets its turret sides.

== See also ==
- Cannon-launched guided projectile
- Pereh
- Tank destroyer
