= Muravey VTS =

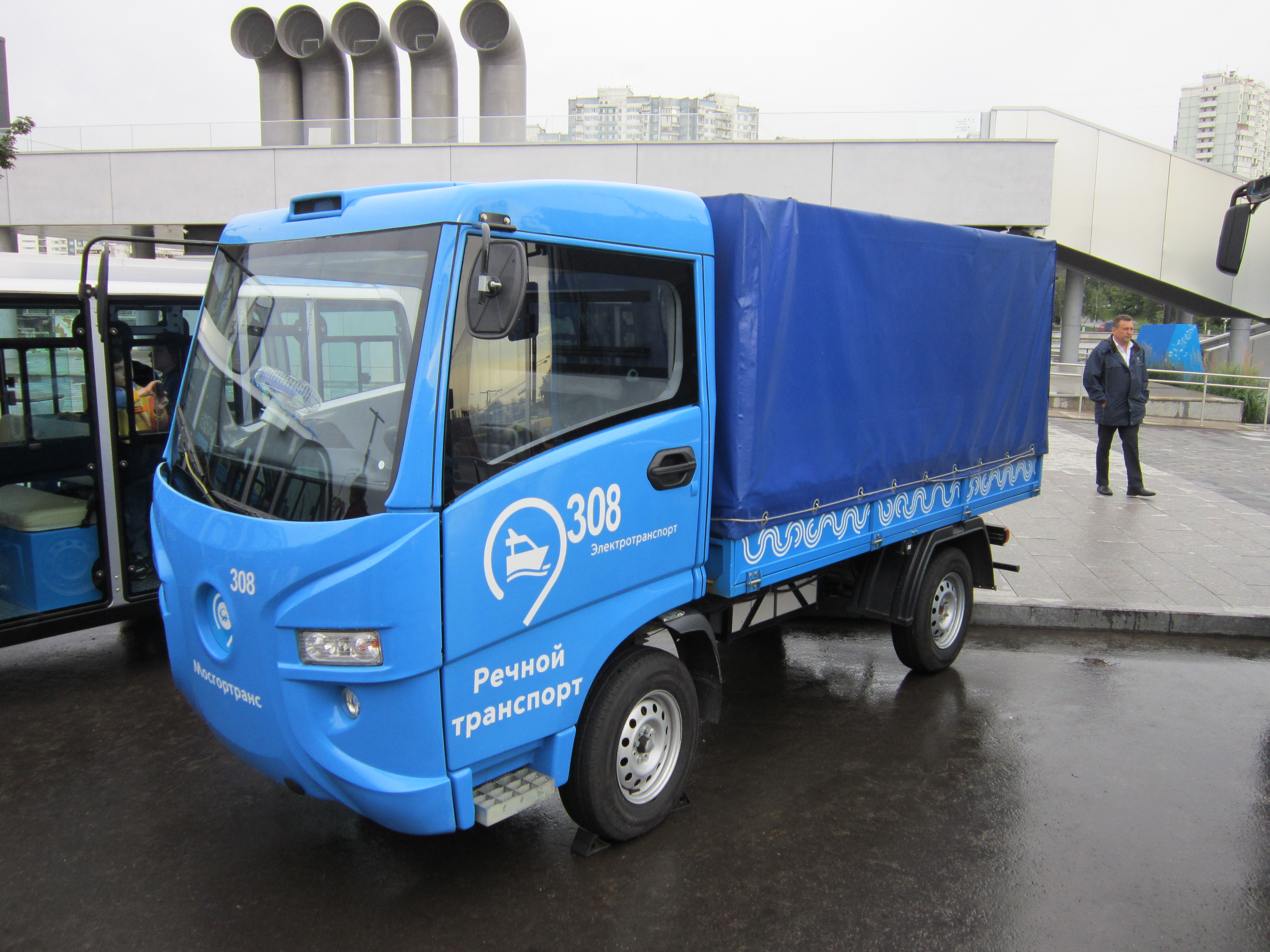

Overview
- Manufacturer: Tulamashzavod
- Production: 2020–present

Body and chassis
- Class: Mini truck
- Body style: Flatbed truck
- Layout: Four-wheel drive

Dimensions
- Wheelbase: 1,695 mm (67 in)
- Length: 3,470 mm (137 in)
- Width: 1,500 mm (59 in)
- Height: 2,100 mm (83 in)

Muravey VTS (Russian: Муравей ВТС, abbreviated as Vnutrizavodskoe Transport Sredstvo) is an electric truck with a cabin produced by Tulamashzavod.

== History ==
For the first time, the development of a new model after the cessation of production in 1995 of cargo scooters Muravey was announced in 2016. In 2017, the first prototype was assembled at the plant.

In May 2020, sales of the truck started with a selling price of 1.25 million rubles.

== Design and characteristics ==
The Muravey VTS is designed for the transportation of goods up to 1 ton in production and storage areas with a hard and even surface on the territory of organizations and industrial bases without the right to leave on public roads.

Two models are presented, differing only in the type of electric drive:

- VTS-1 - drive from a diesel generator set
- VTS-2 - drive from a storage battery

The cabin is double, made of fiberglass. Lead-acid storage battery of 48 volts with a capacity of 350 A · h. The steering is a self-compensating single-stage rack. Spring suspension. Hydraulic brakes, disc / drum. Wheels with dimensions 175 / 70R13. Seats are adjustable, moisture resistant, gray. Instrument cluster with battery indicator, speedometer, odometer. Power reserve: empty up to 90 km; loaded - up to 70 km. 1 year factory warranty.

An army version of the platform with an installed small-caliber cannon has been developed.
