= Yakov Taubin =

Soviet and Russian small arms designer

Yakov Grigoryevich Taubin
- Яков Григорьевич Таубин
- Born: 1900; Pinsk, Minsk Governorate, Russian Empire
- Died: 28 October 1941; Barbysh, Kuibyshev Oblast, RSFSR, USSR
- Occupation: Weapons designer
- Known for: Creating the first successful automatic grenade launcher
- Children: 3
- Awards: Order of Lenin

Yakov Grigoryevich Taubin (Russian: Яков Григорьевич Таубин; 1900 – 28 October 1941) was a Soviet weapons designer. He is best known for creating the first successful automatic grenade launcher. He also designed a prototype gun for the Ilyushin Il-2 which lost in trials against the Volkov-Yartsev VYa-23. He was later arrested and executed.

== Early life ==
Taubin was born in 1900 in Pinsk in the Russian Empire (present Belarus). The date of his birth is not known. His father, an accountant, died in 1915.

In 1929 Taubin entered the Odessa National Academy of Food Technologies (then called the Odessa Institute of Grain and Flour Technology) in the Faculty of Design. While there, during student military training at the academy in the summer of 1931, he encountered a grenade launcher, the single-shot Dyakonov. He set himself the task of creating an automated version.

== The Taubina AG-2 grenade launcher ==
In the fall of 1931, he sent a draft of a design, which used regular 40.8 mm (1.61 in) MG Dyakonov rifle grenades, to the Red Army artillery leadership, and it was accepted for development at the Kovrovsky Tool Plant Number Two. Taubin left the Odessa Institute of Grain and Flour Technology to head the development effort. Later, a group of experts led by Taubin continued this work in Moscow, being organized in the spring of 1934 as an independent design office under OKB-16 of the People's Commissariat of Arms of the USSR. Here, in the period from 1934 to 1938, under Taubin's direction, the world's first infantry automatic grenade launcher was developed and perfected.

This weapon, the AG-2 Taubina, used a 40.6 mm (1.60 in) round with a fragmentation grenade based on the standard Dyakonov, fitted with a flangeless sleeve. The Taubina was magazine-fed and could fire single shots or bursts in either direct or indirect fire. The rate of fire of earlier models, already substantial at 50 to 60 rounds per minute, was later increased to about 436 rounds per minute, although the magazine was initially just five rounds.

The prototypes used a small powder charge which did not provide reliable operation, so the weapon had to be substantially redesigned. Initially gas-operated, in 1936 it was changed to recoil operation. The Taubina originally had a tripod mount and was later mounted on a light wheeled machine-gun carriage. Barrel heating and wear was small due to the small charge, so the maximum rate of fire could be maintained, but the charge was large enough to achieve a maximum range for the weapon of 1,200 m (3,900 ft).

The Taubina had some shortcomings. The extractor and ejector springs were of poor quality, leading to 7.2% of shots causing a failure. The machine was also inaccurate, with rounds scattering in azimuth. After each clip, it was necessary to re-lay the weapon.

The idea of an automatic grenade launcher was opposed by Grigory Kulik, chief of the Main Artillery Directorate, and other military leaders. In 1937–1938, the Taubina was rejected as a company-level support weapon in favour of a mobile, cheap, and well-tested 50 mm (2.0 in) mortar, based on a 1938 design by B. I. Shavyrina.

In 1938, sea trials of the Taubina were made on craft of the Dnieper Flotilla; based on these, the Navy made a small order in January 1939 but soon reversed itself. The Taubina was used in small numbers with success by the Red Army during the Winter War against Finland, but soon all work on the automatic grenade launcher was ended.

Comparison of Taubin AG-2 and standard Red Army light mortar

	Taubin AG-2	RM-38
Weapon Weight	45.5 kg (100 lb)	12.1 kg (27 lb)
Caliber	40.8 mm (1.61 in)	50 mm (2.0 in)
Projectile weight	0.59 kg (1.3 lb)	0.85 kg (1.9 lb)
Practical rate of fire	57 rounds per minute	30 rounds per minute
Effective range	1,250 m (1,370 yd)	800 m (870 yd)

== Other weapons ==
Taubin, together with OKB-16 deputy chief designer Mikhail Baburin, developed other weapons.

For the Ilyushin Il-2 Shturmovik, Taubin developed the 23mm MP-6 gun (also known as the PTB-23). The MP-6 used a short recoil system, weighed 70 kilograms (150 lb), had an initial muzzle velocity of 900 metres per second (3,000 ft/s), and a rate of fire of about 600 rounds per minute, with an 81-round clip provided. Initial airborne trials were conducted (not on the Il-2) in the spring of 1940 and factory trials on the Il-2 in August 1940. In-flight, the ammunition clips sometimes became dislodged because of their large surface, which caused them to experience significant aerodynamic pressure, so the gun was converted to being belt-fed. Although this gun was ultimately not used on the Il-2, Taubin and Barburin were awarded the Order of Lenin for designing it.

Competitive trials were conducted between Taubin's design and the newly developed, gas-operated Volkov-Yartsev VYa-23, a 23mm gun with generally similar characteristics. The VYa-23 won the trials and the development of the MP-6 gun was terminated in May 1941 and Taubin subsequently arrested.

Taubin also developed a tank-based version of the MP-6 (the PT-23TB (Tank Gun 23mm System Taubina-Baburina)), a 23mm infantry air defence gun, and a 12.7mm aircraft machine gun (the AN-12.7), but none of these finished development.

== Arrest and execution ==
On the night of 16 May 1941, Taubin and several associates were arrested on charges of "preserving samples of unfinished weapons and egregiously plotting production of technically unfinished and unsatisfactory weapons systems", namely the 23mm cannons and the 12.7mm machine gun.

Following trial, Taubin was executed by shooting on 28 October 1941, in the village of Barbysh near Samara, Russia (then called Kuybyshev). This place is now Yuri Gagarin Park within the city limits of Samara and contains the mass graves of several thousand victims of execution by Soviet authorities.

The actual impetus for Taubin's arrest and execution was likely Kulik's strong opposition to the AG-2 automatic grenade launcher and consequent hostility toward Taubin.

After his death, leadership of OKB-16 fell to Alexander Nudelman, who would design aircraft guns, rockets, and missiles used extensively in the Cold War.

Taubin was rehabilitated on 20 December 1955.
