= NGC 287 =

Galaxy in the constellation Pisces

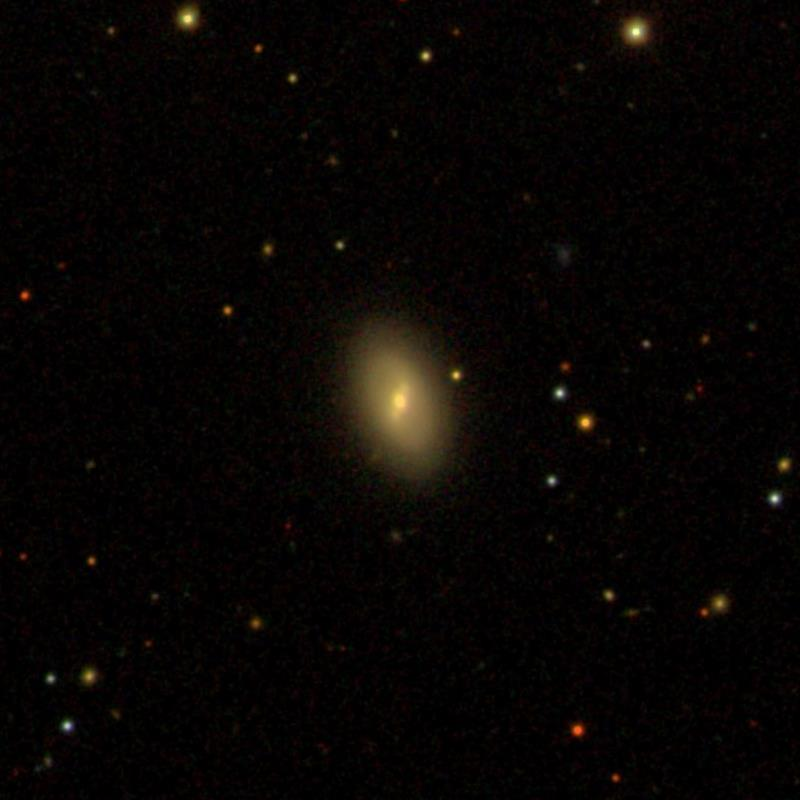
- SDSS image of NGC 287

Observation data (J2000 epoch)
- Constellation: Pisces
- Right ascension: 00^{h} 53^{m} 28.3^{s}
- Declination: +32° 28′ 56″
- Redshift: 0.018383
- Heliocentric radial velocity: 5,511 km/s
- Apparent magnitude (V): 14.8

Characteristics
- Type: S0
- Apparent size (V): 0.7' × 0.5'

Other designations
- CGCG 501-033, 2MASX J00532830+3228561, 2MASXi J0053283+322856, PGC 3145.

NGC 287 is a lenticular galaxy in the constellation Pisces. It was discovered on November 22, 1827, by John Herschel.
