= Muravey, Bashkortostan =

Muravey Муравей
- Village
- Location within Bashkortostan Location within Russia
- Coordinates: 53°42′N 55°53′E
- Country: Russia
- Region: Bashkortostan
- District: Sterlitamaksky District
- Time zone: UTC+5:00

Muravey (Russian: Муравей) is a rural locality (a village) in Kazadayevsky Selsoviet, Sterlitamaksky District, Bashkortostan, Russia. The population was 218 as of 2010. There are 5 streets.

== Geography ==
Muravey is located 14 km northwest of Sterlitamak (the district's administrative centre) by road. Novoye Baryatino is the nearest rural locality.
