= Muravey (scooter) =

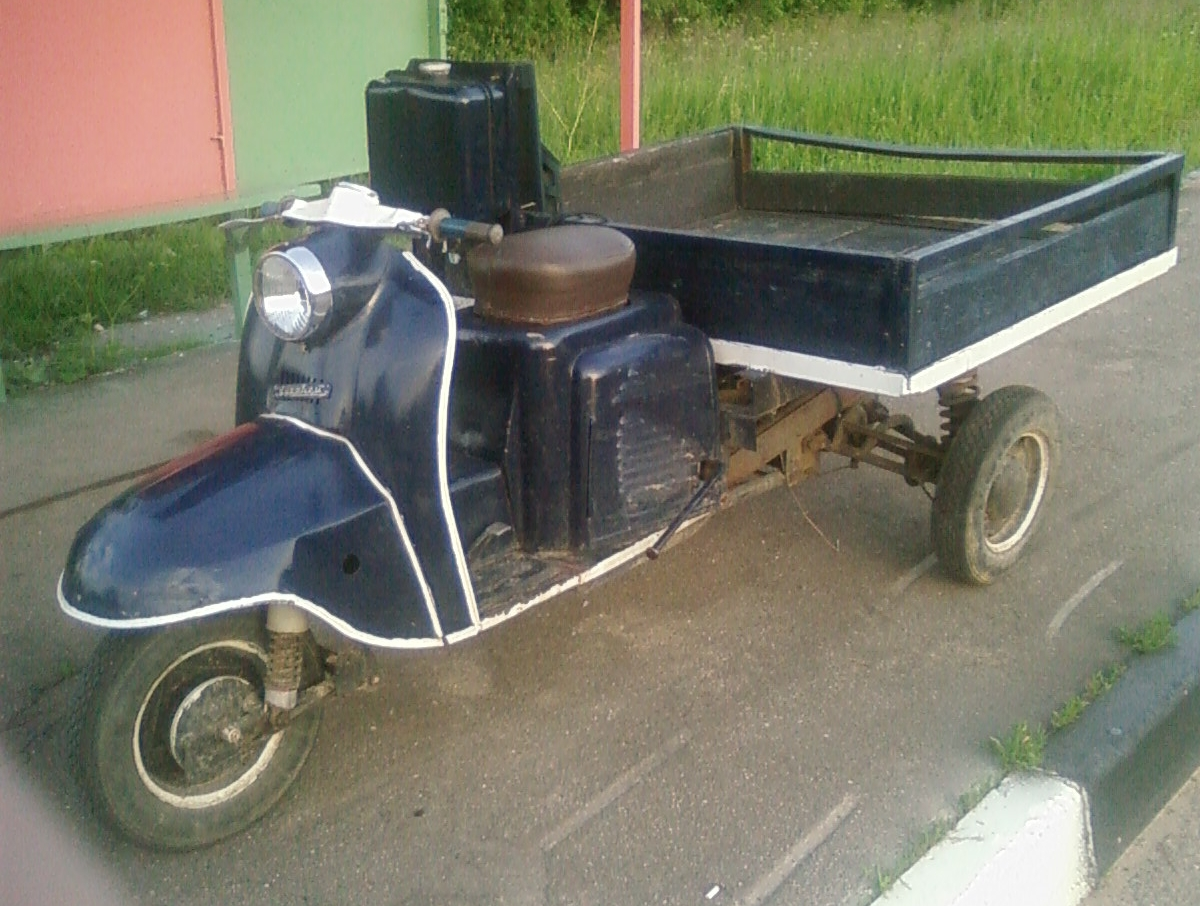
- Manufacturer: Tulamashzavod
- Production: 1959-1995
- Class: Scooter, Tricycle
- Power: 11 HP at 5200 RPM
- Transmission: 4-speed manual transmission with footswitch
- Suspension: independent
- Brakes: drum brakes
- Tires: 101,6×254 мм (4x10 Inches)
- Wheelbase: 1,775 mm (69.9 in)
- Dimensions: L: 2,680 mm (106 in); W: 1,250 mm (49 in); H: 1,075 mm (42.3 in)
- Seat height: 115 mm (4.5 in)
- Fuel capacity: 13 L (2.9 imp gal; 3.4 US gal)

Muravey (Russian: Муравей, English - Ant), is a three-wheeled (3 × 2) cargo scooter. There were several models based on passenger scooters produced by Tulamashzavod from 1959 to 1995.

Since 2020, Tulamashzavod has been producing a four-wheeled electric pallet truck with a cab named the Muravey VTS.

== Models ==
In the first years of production, the cargo family had 2 modifications: TV-200K with an onboard platform, a load capacity of 200 kg and TV-200F with a van body. In 1962, production of the TV-200I with an isothermal body for the transportation of perishable goods began. TV-200 did not have the name "Muravey" yet.

- TG200 (T-200 «Tula», "Muravey")
- TGA200 (T-200M)
- TGA200-01 ("Tourist")
- TGA200-01P
- «Muravey-2 01» («Tulitsa»)
- «Muravey-2 02» («Tulitsa-2»)
- «Muravey-2 03»
- GTS-1
