= High Precision Systems =

Russian defense company

- Native name: Высокоточные комплексы
- Industry: Defense
- Founded: 2009; 17 years ago
- Headquarters: Moscow, Russia
- Revenue: $1.98 billion (2016; 2018)
- Net income: $236 million (2016)
- Number of employees: 28,278 (2016)
- Parent: Rostec
- Website: www.npovk.ru

High Precision Systems (Russian: Высокоточные комплексы, romanized: Vysokotochnye Kompleksy) is a holding company within the Russian state-owned Rostec group involved in the defence-industry complex.

It focuses on high-precision systems and weapons for the combat tactical zone. It implements the full production cycle of weapons and defence equipment, from generating ideas to product distribution.

According to Jane's Information Group, Rostec is seeking to sell a 49% stake in High Precision Systems.

The company reported in May 2025 that it has increased production by 2.5 to 25 times in some areas during the 2022–2025 period.

== Structure ==
Subsidiaries of the holding:

- KBP Instrument Design Bureau
- KB Tochmash
- KB Mashinostroyeniya
- Safonovsky Meteorological Instruments Plant
- Tulatochmash
- Shcheglovsky Val
- AO CKBA
- Tula Arms Plant
- TsKIB SOO
- Volsky Mechanical Plant
- All-Russian Research Institute Signal
- Saratov aggregate plant
- Serpukhov factory Metallist
- Central Research Institute for Automation and Hydraulics
- SKB Turbine
- Degtyarev plant
- Kovrov Electromechanical Plant
- Tula Cartridge Plant
- JSC Rotor
- JSC Nytva
- Tulamashzavod

== Directors ==
Interim General Director — Ryazantsev Oleg Nikolaevich
