= Tulamashzavod =

Russian manufacturing company

- Industry: Arms industry
- Founded: 1879
- Headquarters: Tula, Russia
- Products: Missiles, Autocannons, Close-in weapon systems (CIWS), Vehicles, Motorcycles
- Parent: High Precision Systems
- Website: www.tulamash.ru

JSC Tulamashzavod (Russian: Тульский машиностроительный завод) also known as Tula Machine-Building Plant is a company based in Tula, Russia. During the Soviet era it was known for its production of weapons and motorcycles. It is part of High Precision Systems, a Rostec company.

Tulamashzavod was established in 1879. It is a major producer of guns and missiles for land, air, and naval forces. It is also a large producer of civilian motorscooters, of which it built 97,000 in 1989. It has two design bureaus, one for civilian, and another for military goods. The Machine-Building Plant is adjacent to the Tula Arms Plant. Plants in Tula work closely with the Tula Scientific Research Technological Institute (TNITI), which conducts research on the use of steel alloys in weapons which are in mass production. It was privatized in 1992.

== Products ==
- 30 mm automatic cannon 2A42
- Afanasev Makarov AM-23
- Rikhter R-23
- AK-630
- Kashtan CIWS
- Muravey (scooter)
