= 287 =

287 in various calendars
- Gregorian calendar: 287; CCLXXXVII
- Ab urbe condita: 1040
- Assyrian calendar: 5037
- Balinese saka calendar: 208–209
- Bengali calendar: −307 – −306
- Berber calendar: 1237
- Buddhist calendar: 831
- Burmese calendar: −351
- Byzantine calendar: 5795–5796
- Chinese calendar: 丙午年 (Fire Horse); 2984 or 2777 — to — 丁未年 (Fire Goat); 2985 or 2778
- Coptic calendar: 3–4
- Discordian calendar: 1453
- Ethiopian calendar: 279–280
- Hebrew calendar: 4047–4048
- Hindu calendars
- Vikram Samvat: 343–344
- Shaka Samvat: 208–209
- Kali Yuga: 3387–3388
- Holocene calendar: 10287
- Iranian calendar: 335 BP – 334 BP
- Islamic calendar: 345 BH – 344 BH
- Javanese calendar: 167–168
- Julian calendar: 287; CCLXXXVII
- Korean calendar: 2620
- Minguo calendar: 1625 before ROC 民前1625年
- Nanakshahi calendar: −1181
- Seleucid era: 598/599 AG
- Thai solar calendar: 829–830
- Tibetan calendar: མེ་ཕོ་རྟ་ལོ་ (male Fire-Horse); 413 or 32 or −740 — to — མེ་མོ་ལུག་ལོ་ (female Fire-Sheep); 414 or 33 or −739

Year 287 (CCLXXXVII) was a common year starting on Saturday of the Julian calendar. In the Roman Empire, it was known as the Year of the Consulship of Diocletian and Maximian (or, less frequently, year 1040 Ab urbe condita). The denomination 287 for this year has been used since the early medieval period, when the Anno Domini calendar era became the prevalent method in Europe for naming years.

== Events ==
=== By place ===
==== Roman Empire ====
- On the same day that he is made consul, Maximian launches a campaign against an invasion of Gaul by the Alemanni. After defeating this invasion, he then invades Alemannia itself, entering across the Upper Rhine and returning to Roman territory via the Upper Danube.
- Around this time, the future emperor Constantius defeats and captures a Germanic king, the latter having prepared an ambush against the Romans.
- Diocletian signs a peace treaty with King Bahram II of Persia, and installs the pro-Roman Arsacid Tiridates III as king over the western portion of Armenia.
- Diocletian re-organizes the Mesopotamian frontier, and fortifies various locations including the city of Circesium (modern Busayrah) on the Euphrates. Around this time, he begins the construction of the Strata Diocletiana. Throughout his reign, similar fortification efforts are conducted on the other frontiers as well, with fortifications constructed or restored behind, on and beyond the borders. Conscription and the number of legions increase, although the legions themselves are reformed into smaller and more flexible units. At some point in time, Diocletian may have also established the late Roman military system of Comitatenses (field army units) and Limitanei (border units), but some scholars date this development to the reign of Constantine I (r. 306–337).
- September – The first Indiction begins.

== Deaths ==
- Justa and Rufina, Christian martyrs
- Maurice (or Mauritius), Christian martyr
- Quentin, Christian missionary and martyr
- Valerius and Rufinus, Christian martyrs
- Victoricus, Fuscian, and Gentian, Christian martyrs
