= Muravey, Altai Krai =

Muravey Муравей
- Settlement
- Location within Altai Krai Location within Russia
- Coordinates: 53°53′N 84°43′E
- Country: Russia
- Region: Altai Krai
- District: Zalesovsky District
- Time zone: UTC+7:00

Muravey (Russian: Муравей) is a rural locality (a settlement) in Zalesovsky Selsoviet, Zalesovsky District, Altai Krai, Russia. The population was 238 as of 2013. There are 5 streets.

== Geography ==
Muravey is located 16 km south of Zalesovo (the district's administrative centre) by road. Zalesovo is the nearest rural locality.
