= 9K35 Strela-10 =

9K35 Strela-10 SA-13 Gopher
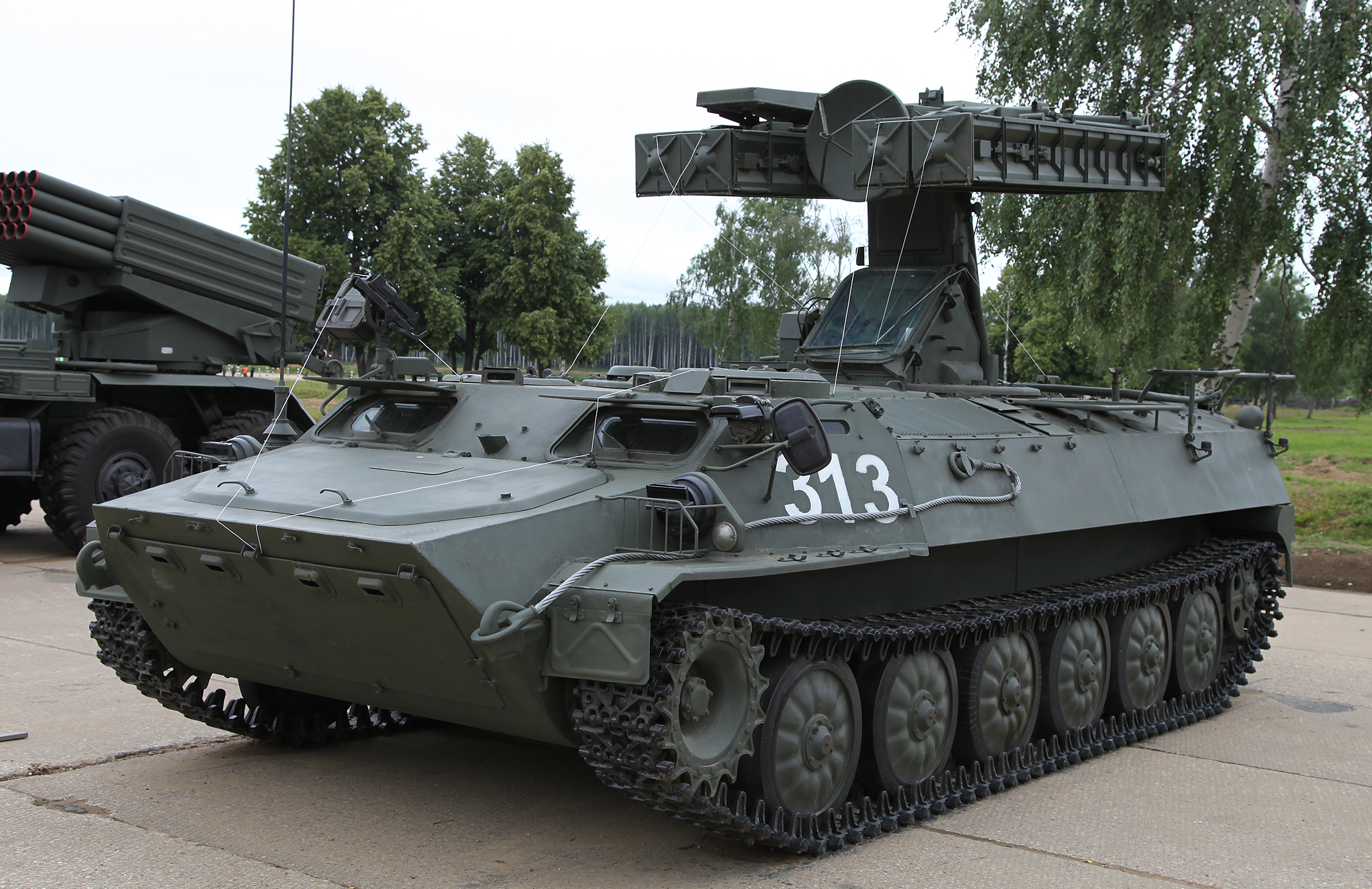
- 9K35 transporter erector launcher and radar
- Type: Vehicle-mounted SAM system
- Place of origin: Soviet Union

Service history
- In service: 1976–present
- Used by: See list of operators
- Wars: Angolan Civil War; Iran–Iraq War; Persian Gulf War; Afghan Civil War (1989–1992); Afghan Civil War (1992–1996); Kosovo War; Syrian Civil War; Russo-Ukrainian War; Russo-Ukrainian war (2022–present); Second Nagorno-Karabakh War

Production history
- Designer: KB Tochmash Design Bureau of Precision Engineering
- Designed: 1969–1976
- Manufacturer: Saratovskiy Zenit Machine Plant (Muromteplovoz Joint Stock Company for the 9K35M3-K)
- Produced: 1976–present
- Variants: Strela-10, Strela-10SV (Prototype), Strela-10M, Strela-10M2, Strela-10M3, Strela-10M3-K, Strela-10M4

Specifications (9K35 Strela-10M3)
- Mass: 12,300 kg
- Length: 6,600 mm
- Width: 2,850 mm
- Height: 2,300 mm (travelling), 3,800 mm (firing)
- Crew: 3 (commander, gunner and driver)
- Armour: 7 mm
- Main armament: 4 × 9M333 (or 9M37MD)
- Secondary armament: 1x PKMB machine gun
- Engine: YaMZ-238 V diesel 240 hp
- Suspension: torsion bar
- Ground clearance: 0.5 m
- Fuel capacity: 450 litres
- Operational range: 500 km
- Maximum speed: 61.5 km/h (road); 6 km/h (water)

The 9K35 Strela-10 (Russian: 9К35 «Стрела-10»; English: arrow) is a Soviet highly mobile, short-range surface-to-air missile system. It is visually aimed, and utilizes optical/infrared-guidance. The system is primarily intended to engage low-altitude threats, such as helicopters. "9K35" is its GRAU designation; its NATO reporting name is SA-13 "Gopher".

== Development ==
The 9K35 is the successor of the 9K31 Strela-1 and can also use the Strela-1's missiles in place of the 9M37.

Development of the 9K37 Strela-10SV system was initiated on 24 July 1969. The decision to begin the development of a new non-all-weather system was taken despite the simultaneous development of an all-weather hybrid gun/missile system 2K22 "Tunguska", mainly as an economical measure. It was also seen as advantageous to have a system capable of fast reaction times and immunity to heavy radio-frequency jamming.

Rather than being mounted on an amphibious but lightly armoured BRDM-2 chassis like the 9K31, the 9K35 is mounted on a more mobile tracked, modified MT-LB, with more room for equipment and missile reloads. Provision for amphibious capability is provided in some variants in the form of polyurethane-filled floats.

The Strela-10SV system and its 9M37 missile were tested on the Donguzkom range from 1973 to 1974, but the results were disappointing: the system was found deficient in terms of missile probability of kill and vehicle reliability, among other issues. Acceptance into service was thus delayed until 16 May 1976, by which time improvements had been made to the system.

Development of the system continued over the years with Strela-10M, -10M2 and -10M3 variants introducing among other things improved radio communications and better integration with Soviet integrated air defence system air picture data. Improved missiles (9M37M and 9M333) were also developed, and by September 2007, the 9K35M3-K Kolchan variant, mounted on a BTR-60 wheeled chassis, was displayed for the first time at the Moscow Air Show MAKS 2007.

The Russian Armed Forces were to receive 72 advanced mobile "night" short-range "Strela-10M4" anti-aircraft missile complexes by 2016. In 2014, the Russian Airborne Troops received the first batch of 18 "Strela-10M4" vehicles. This modernization was intended to extend the service life of the system by 3–5 years.

The Strela-10M is expected to be replaced by the Sosna anti-aircraft missile system. The system is based on the MT-LB chassis consisting of 12 Sosna-R 9M337 beam rider missiles with a range of 10 km and altitude of 5 km.

== Description ==
=== Associated systems and vehicles ===
The 9K35 is a SAM system with electro-optical guidance. It has the capability to use radars for target acquisition and range. Some vehicles have a pintle-mounted PKT 7.62 mm machine gun in front of the forward hatch for close-in protection. Other vehicles have been seen with additional support railings for the system on the rear deck. The following is a list of associated equipment:

- 9A34M2, 9A34M3-K: launcher vehicle with 9S86 (NATO designation "SNAP SHOT") range only radar located between the two pairs of missile canisters on the transporter erector launcher and radar (TELAR) (maximum radar range is 450 to 10,000 m).
- 9A35M2, 9A35M3-K: launcher vehicle with 9S16 (NATO designation "Flat Box-B") passive radar detection system that gives a 360° azimuth and minimum 40° elevation coverage
- 9F624 and 9F624M training simulator
- 9S482M7 Control Post
- 9U111: a 1,950 kg trailer-mounted 12 kW generator unit, designed to feed power to up to four 9A35M2, 9A35M3-K or 9A34M2, 9A34M3-K launcher vehicles at a distance of up to 30 m by cable while conducting maintenance or training operations.
- 9V839M: system checkout vehicle
- 9V915M, 9V915M-1: technical maintenance vehicle
- MT-LBU with 9S80 (NATO designation "DOG EAR") F/G-band target acquisition radar (maximum range 80 km (50 miles))
- Ranzhir-M 9S737М (GRAU designation 9S737): it is a mobile command center for a mixed grouping of air defense forces, such as the Tor, Tunguska, Strela-10, and Igla.

=== Missiles ===
9M37
- Type: Surface-to-air missile
- Place of origin: Soviet Union

Service history
- In service: 1976–present
- Used by: See Operators

Production history
- Designer: KB Tochmash Design Bureau
- Designed: 1969–1976
- Manufacturer: Degtyarev plant
- Produced: 1976–present
- Variants: 9M37, 9M37M, 9M37MD, 9M333

Specifications (9M333)
- Mass: 41 kg
- Length: 2190 mm
- Diameter: 120 mm
- Wingspan: 360 mm
- Warhead: Frag-HE
- Warhead weight: 5 kg
- Detonation mechanism: contact and laser proximity fuzes
- Propellant: single-stage solid propellant rocket motor
- Operational range: 5 kilometres (3.1 mi)
- Flight altitude: 3,500 metres (11,500 ft)
- Maximum speed: 550 m/s
- Guidance system: dual-mode passive 'photocontrast'/IR seeker

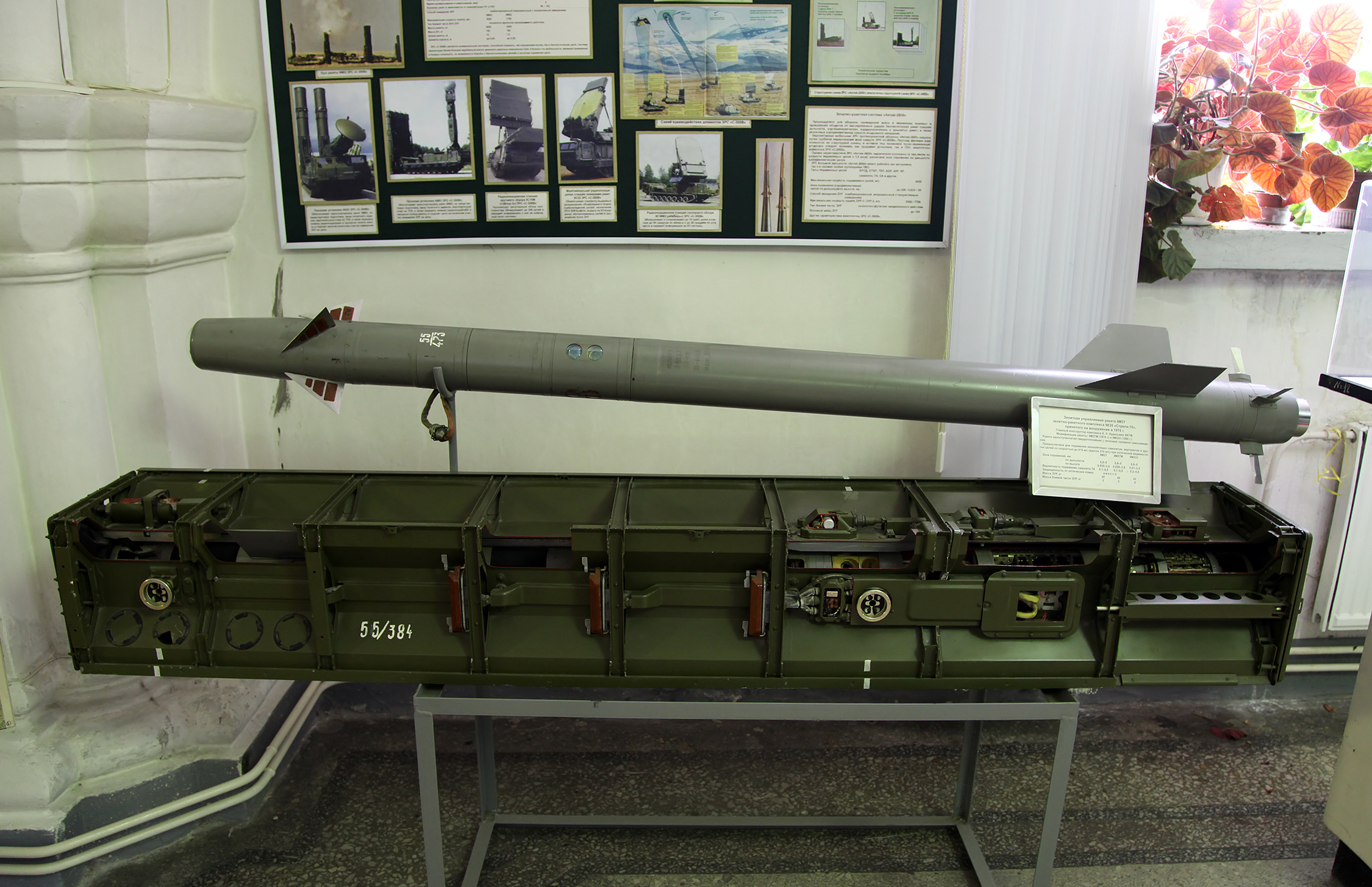
The 9M37 guided missile

The Strela-10 system was originally designed to use the 9M37 missile as its primary weapon, but its launch system was designed to be also backwards compatible with the 9M31M missile of the earlier 9K31 Strela-1.

Each 9M37 missile is 2,200 mm (7.2 ft) long, weighs 40 kg (88 pounds) and carries a 3.5 kg (7.7 pound) warhead. The maximum speed of the missile is near Mach 2, engagement range is from 800 to 5000 m (0.3–3 miles) and engagement altitude is between 10 and 3500 m (33-11,500 ft). (The ranges define the zone of target intercept, minimum and maximum launch distances are longer for approaching and shorter for receding targets, depending on the target's speed, altitude and flight direction.)

Four missiles are mounted on the turret in boxes, ready to launch, and eight more are carried inside the vehicle as reloads. Reloading takes around 3 minutes.

The 9M37 was quickly replaced with a slightly improved 9M37M (the main improvement was a more efficient autopilot system for missile flight path control), and later the significantly upgraded 9M333, which introduced the following:

- heavier warhead of improved expanding-rod design and larger HE content
- new proximity fuzing with 8-ray laser to improve probability of fuzing on near misses of very small targets, such as cruise missiles or UAVs
- triple-channel guidance system for more robust countermeasure rejection
- improved engine to provide similar performance despite the slight increase in missile length and weight.

All missiles—9M31M, 9M37, 9M37M and 9M333—are equipped with optical homing heads utilizing reticle-based photocontrast and/or infrared homing. 9M333 is said to have particularly good countermeasure resistance due to its triple-channel homing head, while the 9M37/9M37M's photocontrast channel is described as back-up method to the IR channel.

All main variants—Strela-10SV, Strela-10M, Strela-10M2 and Strela-10M3—can use all aforementioned missile types.

The main characteristics of the missiles are listed in the table below, based on source number unless otherwise noted. For comparison purposes, data for nearest western equivalent, the somewhat larger and heavier MIM-72 Chaparral, is also provided.

As the photocontrast channel provides effective head-on engagement ability, firing range against an approaching target can be considerably longer than the maximum ranges listed above, likewise maximum firing range would be considerably less than the maximum range of target destruction against a receding target. Definition of range and effective ceiling for MIM-72 is unknown and the figures are therefore not directly comparable.

System	9K31 Strela-1M	9K35 Strela-10	9K35M Strela-10M3-K	9K35M Strela-10M4	MIM-72A Chaparral	MIM-72G Chaparral
Missile	9M31M	9M37	9M37M	9M333	MIM-72A	MIM-72G
year of introduction	1971	1976	1981	1989	1967	1982/1990(*)
diameter [mm]	120	120	120	120	127	127
length [mm]	1803	2190	2190	2230	2900	2900
weight [kg]	32	40	40	42	86	86
warhead (HE) [kg]	2.6	3	3	5	11	12.6
fuze	impact and proximity	proximity + impact	proximity + impact	8-ray laser proximity + impact	impact + radar proximity	impact + directional doppler radar proximity
seeker head	AM-modulated photocontrast (uncooled PbS detector element)	Two-channel: 1) AM-modulated photocontrast (cooled PbS), 2) FM-modulated uncooled IR	Two-channel: 1) AM-modulated photocontrast (cooled PbS), 2) FM-modulated uncooled IR	Three-channel: 1) photocontrast, 2) IR, 3) IRCCM channel	cooled IR of AIM-9D (limited/no forward hemisphere capability)	two-channel: 1) cooled all-aspect IR, 2) UV (forward-hemisphere / long-range homing + IRCCM)
Min. range of target destruction [km]	0.8	0.8	0.8	0.8	?	?
Max. range of target destruction [km]	4.2	5.0	5.0	5.0	6..9 (sources vary)	6..9 (sources vary)
Min. intercept altitude [m]	30	25	25	10	15	15
Max. intercept altitude [m]	3000	3500	3500	3500	3000	3000
speed [m/s]	420	517	517	517	515 (Mach 1.5)	515 (Mach 1.5)
target max speed [m/s]: approaching / receding	?	415/310	415/310	415/310	?	?

(*) Contract for production of MIM-72G by retrofitting new components was awarded in late 1982, with all missile in US service upgraded by the late 1980s. New production of MIM-72G missiles started in 1990.

== Combat use ==
=== Angolan Civil War ===
On 20 February 1988, 31-year-old Major Edward Richard Every from 1 Squadron SAAF, was killed in action when his Mirage F1AZ (serial 245) was shot down by a Cuban Strela-10 surface-to-air missile in Cuatir (near Menongue) while on an attack mission over Southern Angola.

=== Persian Gulf War ===
Iraq had several operational Strela-10 systems at the beginning of the 1991 international operation to liberate Kuwait from Iraqi occupation, most if not all of which were organized as part of the battlefield air defence systems of the Republican Guard divisions.

During the operation, 27 coalition aircraft are believed to have been hit by Iraqi IR-homing SAMs, resulting in 14 losses. Some of the losses were shot down on the spot, while others, such as OA-10A 77-0197, returned to base only to be lost in a crash landing. Others landed safely, but were written off as total losses.

At least two losses are believed to have been due to Strela-10s: on 15 February 1991, an A-10A (78-0722) of 353rd TFS/354th TFW was hit by a SAM believed to be a Strela-10, some 100 km north west of Kuwait City, while attacking Republican Guard targets. Pilot Lt Robert Sweet ejected and was made a prisoner of war. While attempting to protect Sweet on the ground, his wingman Steven Phyllis, flying another A-10A (79-0130), was also hit by what is believed to have been a Strela-10. Phyllis was killed in the incident.

=== Kosovo War ===
During the NATO bombing campaign against the FR Yugoslavia, a Strela-10 hit a United States Air Force A-10 on 11 May 1999.

=== Syrian Civil War ===
On 14 April 2018, American, British and French forces launched a barrage of 105 air-to-surface and cruise missiles targeting eight sites in Syria. According to a Russian source, five Strela-10 missiles launched in response, destroying three incoming missiles, However, the US Department of Defense stated in a daily press briefing that no Allied missiles were shot down.

=== 2020 Nagorno-Karabakh war ===
The Armenian Air Force employed Strela-10 missile systems during the 2020 Nagorno-Karabakh conflict. During the opening days of the war, several videos released by the Azerbaijani military showed several Armenian 9K33 Osa and Strela-10 vehicles destroyed by Bayraktar TB2 armed drones.

=== Russo-Ukrainian War ===
A Strela-10 from the Ukrainian Armed Forces was recorded running over a civilian car in the opening weeks of the war. The driver of the car was uninjured. A Russian Strela-10M guarding Snake Island was destroyed by a Bayraktar TB2 on 30 April 2022. A Ukrainian Strela-10M system was reported destroyed by the Russian Air Force near Lisichansk on 17 June 2022. A Russian source claimed in September 2023 that Russia was using the 9M333 missile in Ukraine.

==== Wagner Group rebellion ====
A published video showed a Strela-10 targeting and nearly hitting a Russian Army Ka-52 helicopter near Voronezh; the missile was decoyed by flares.

== Operators ==
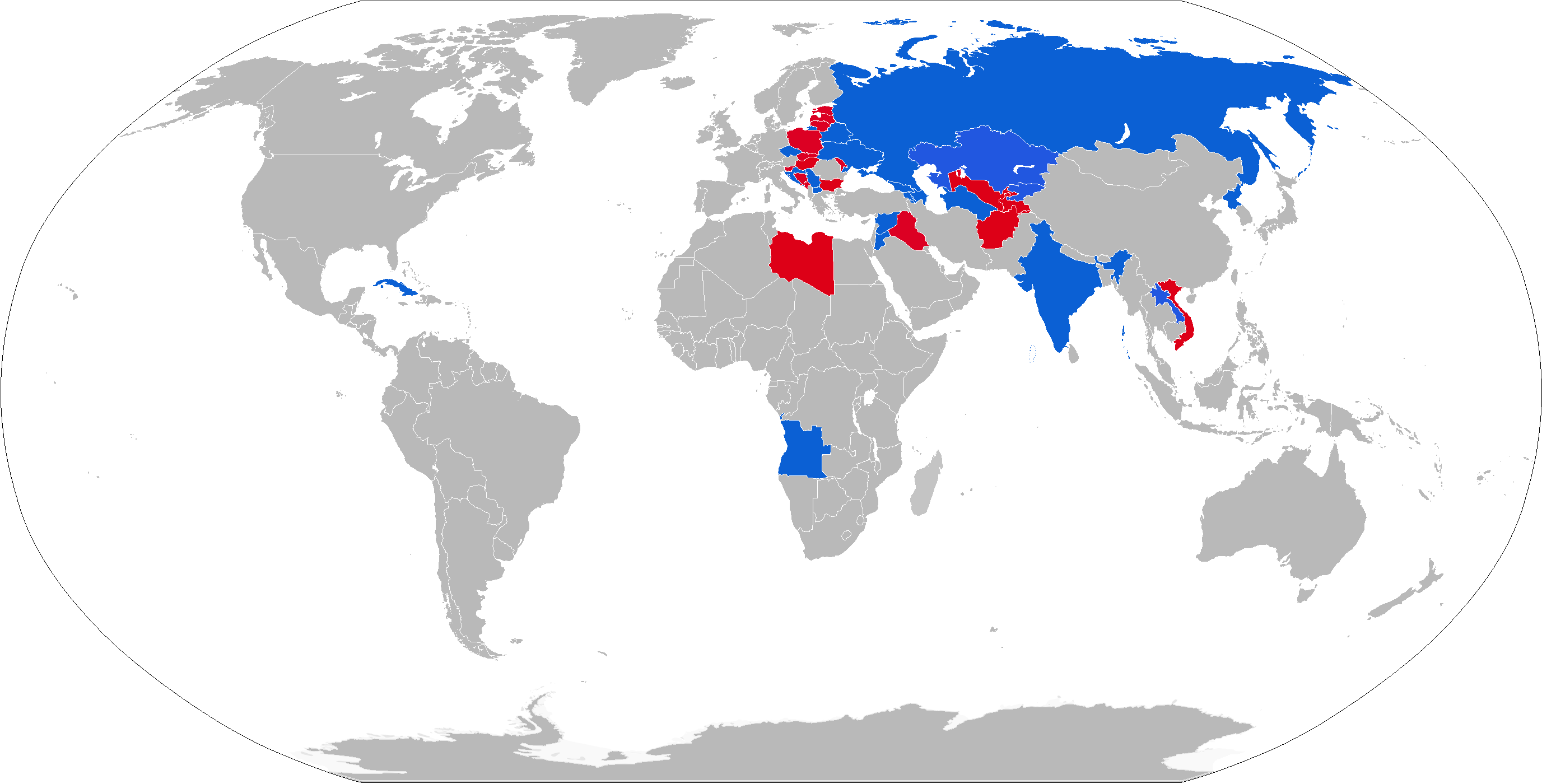
Operators Current Former

=== Current operators ===
- Angola
- Armenia: Unknown amount in service in 2023.
- Azerbaijan: Unknown amount in service in 2023.
- Belarus: Unknown amount in service in 2023.
- Cuba: 200 in service in 2023.
- Croatia: 3 9K35 Strela-10M3 and 6 9K35 Strela-10CRO in service in 2024.
- Czech Republic: 9 in service in 2024.
- Georgia: Unknown amount in service in 2023.
- India: Unknown amount in service in 2023.
- Jordan: 92 in service in 2023
- Kazakhstan: Unknown amount in service in 2023.
- Kyrgyzstan: Unknown amount in service in 2023.
- Laos: In service as of January 2019.
- Mongolia
- North Korea: Manufactured domestically under designation 1976 model year self-propelled missile launcher Type 10.
- North Macedonia: 8 launchers.
- Russia: 350. The 9M333 missile was in production as of 2026. 100 Strela-10MNs delivered 2012–2020.
- Serbia: 18
- Syria: Unknown amount in service in 2023.
- Turkmenistan: 13 in service as of 2023
- Ukraine: Unknown amount in service in 2023.
- Vietnam: 20

=== Former operators ===
- Afghanistan: 16+ launchers prior to the 1992–1996 Afghan Civil War.
- Bulgaria: Withdrawn from service.
- Czechoslovakia: Passed on successor states.
- East Germany: Retired after reunification.
- Hungary: Withdrawn from service.
- Iraq: Some destroyed in combat, all remaining units were written off after the Iraq War in 2003.
- Libya: 60+ launchers in 1992, unknown number operational prior to the 2011 Libyan civil war.
- Poland: 4, probably withdrawn in 2001–2002.
- Slovakia: Withdrawn from service.
- Soviet Union: Passed on to successor states.
- Yugoslavia: Passed on to successor states.

== Gallery ==
Strela-10 of the Russian 4th Guards Tank Division

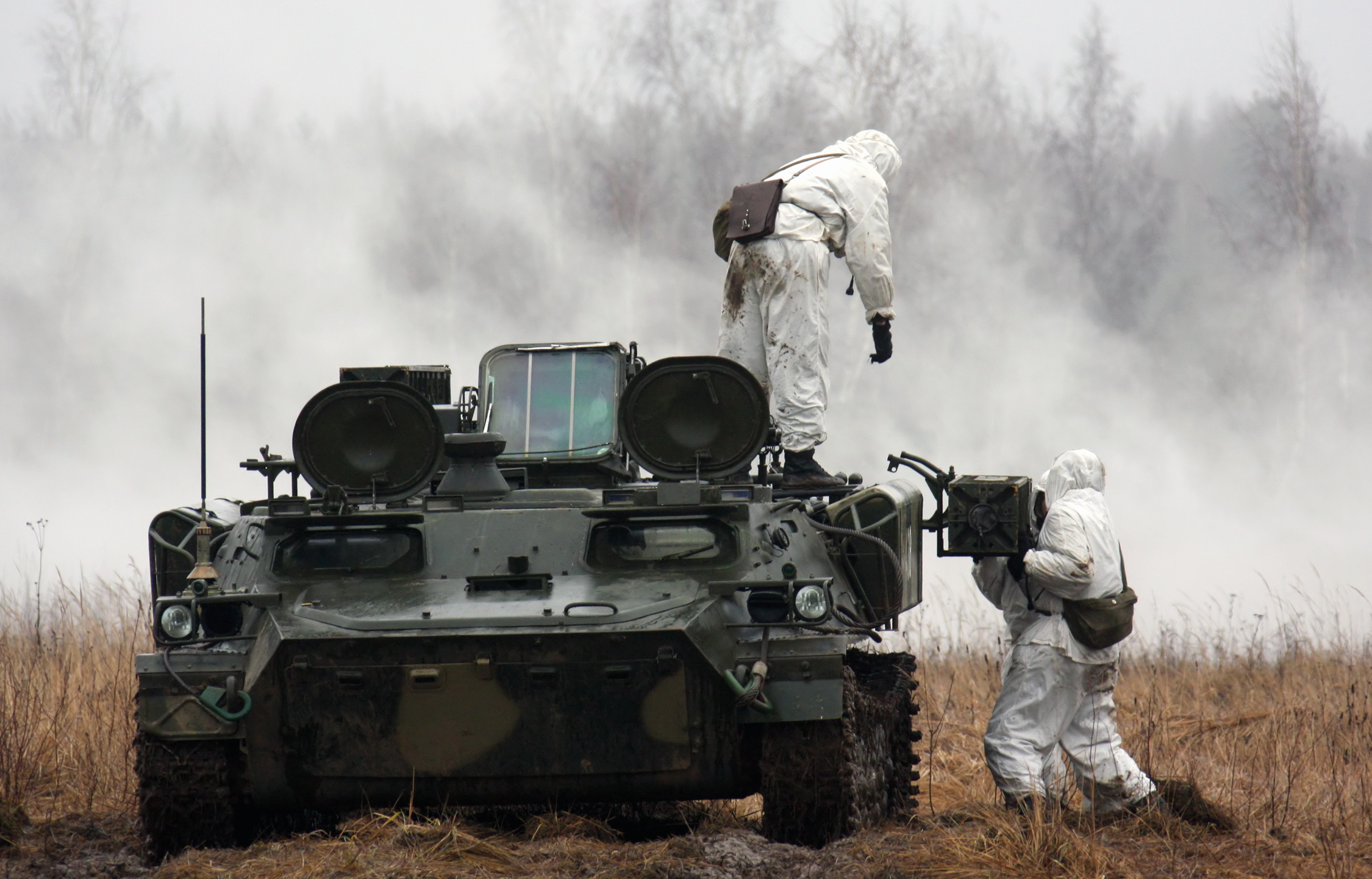

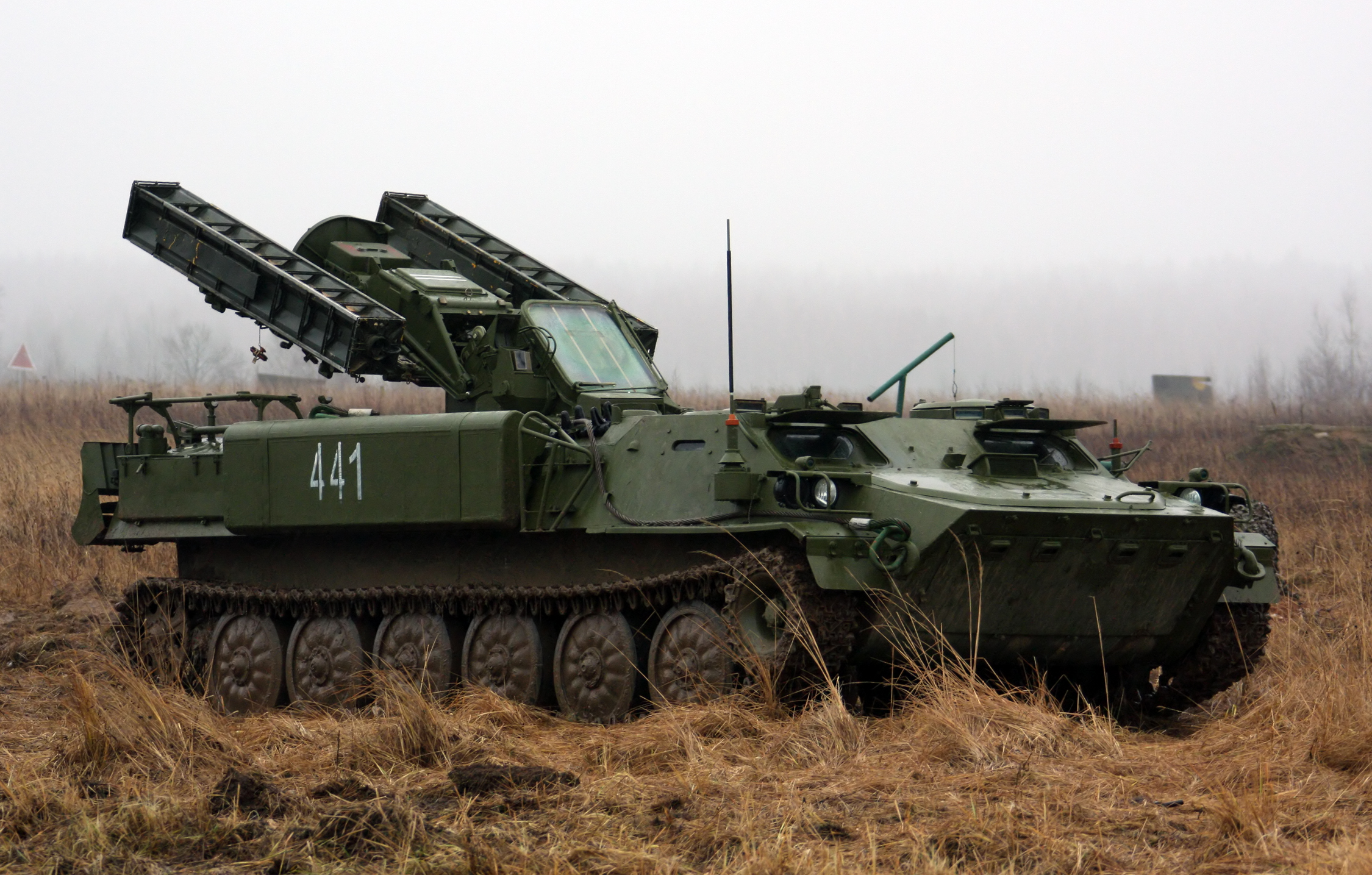

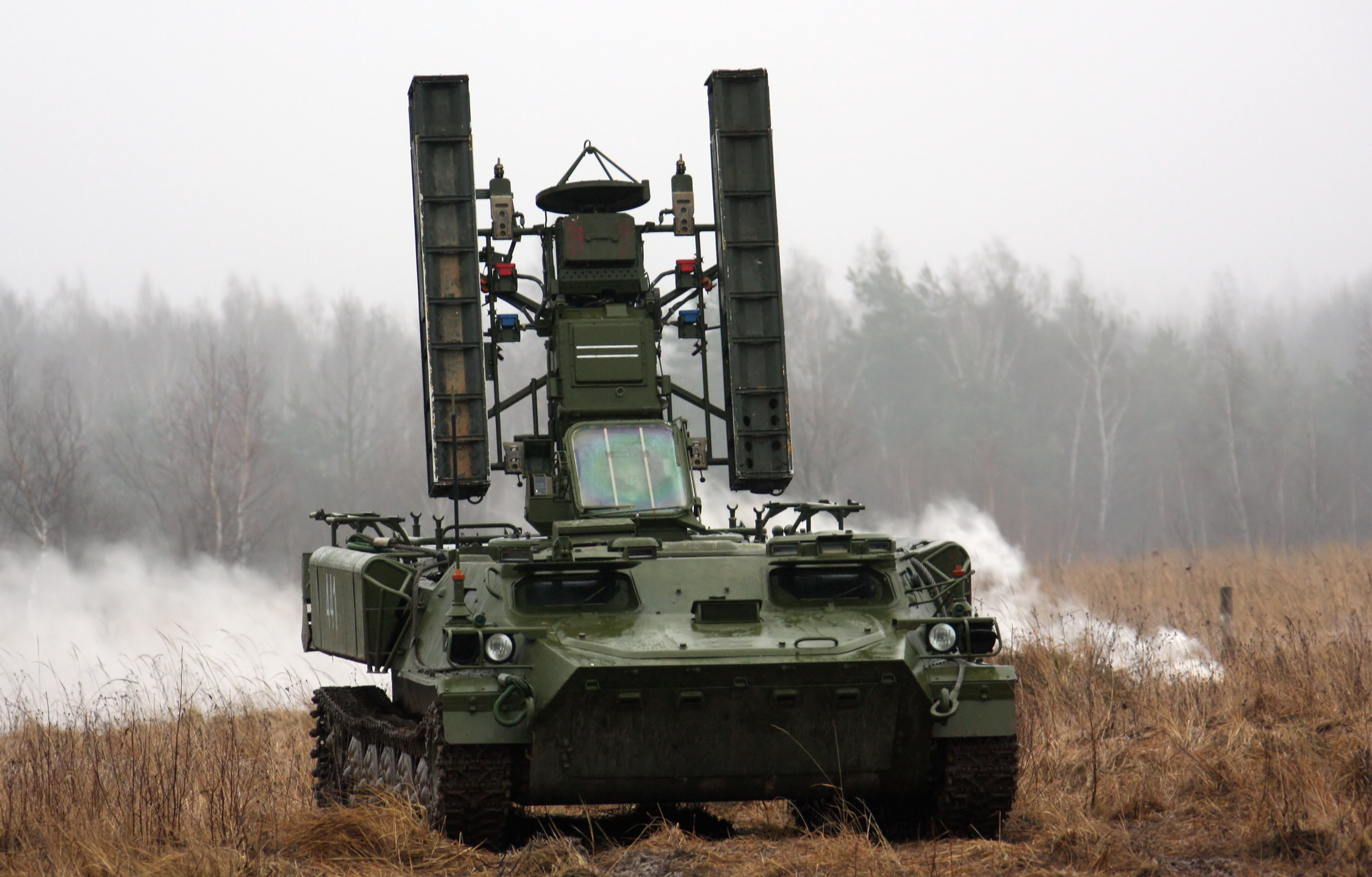

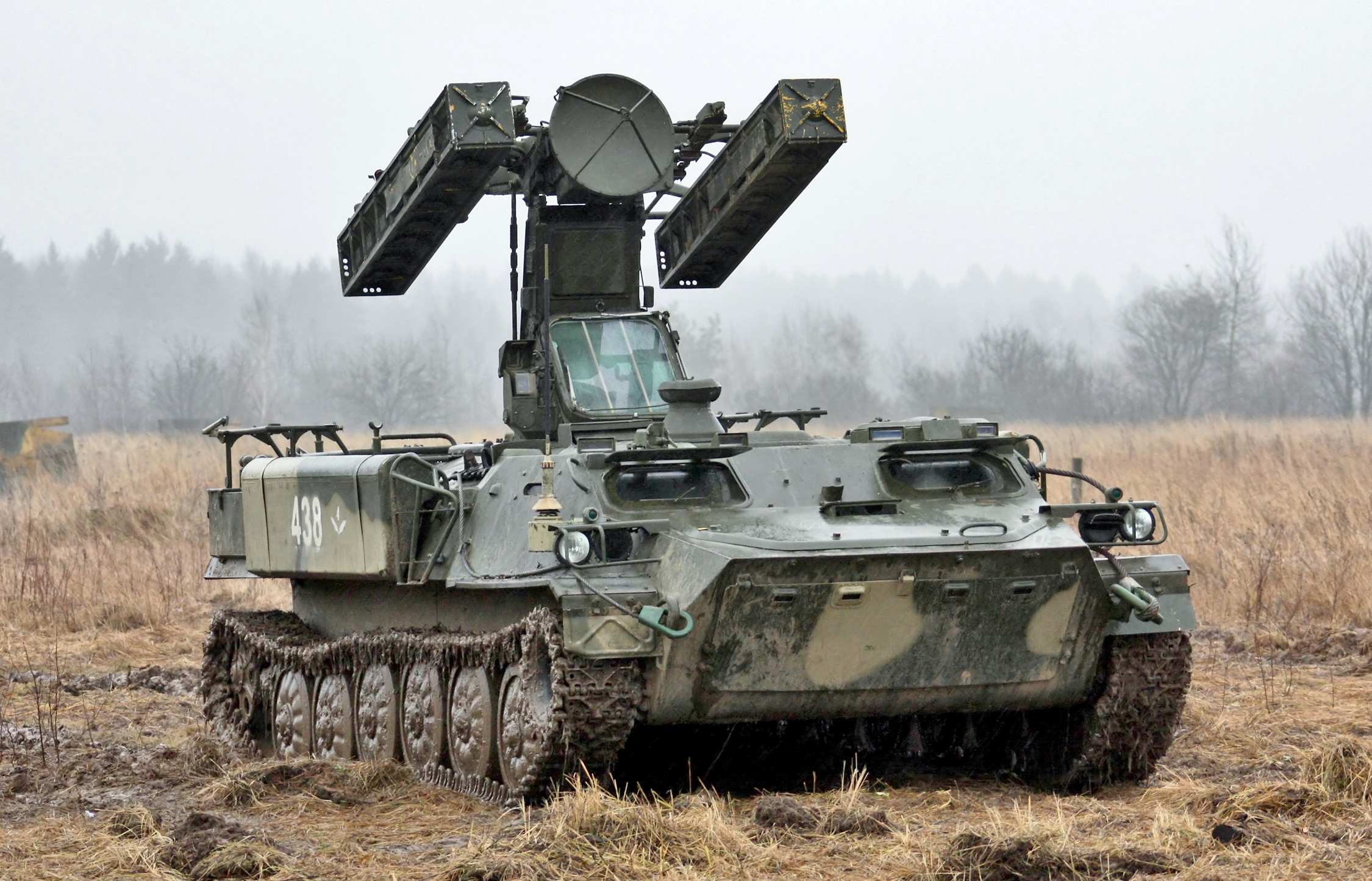

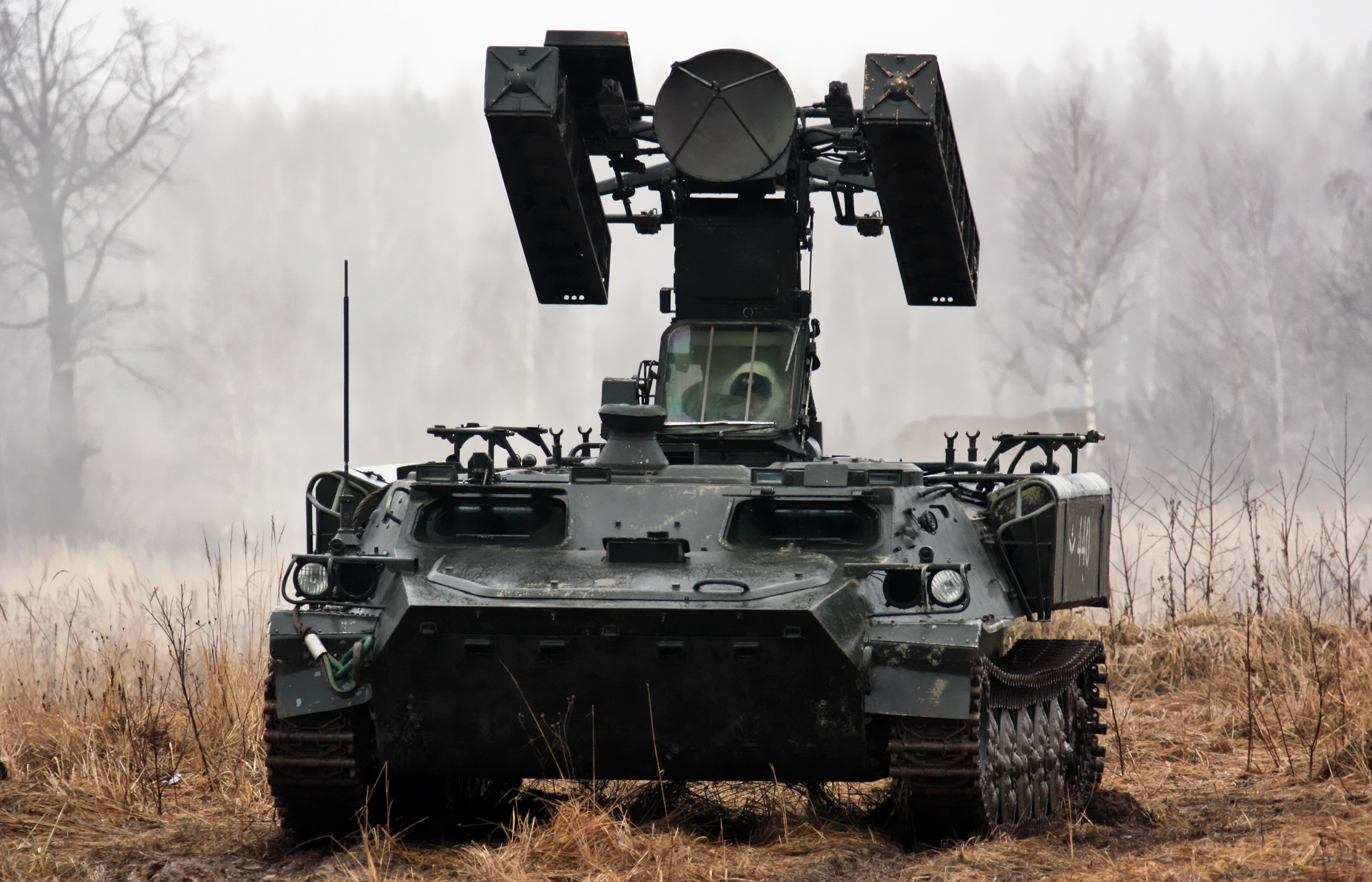

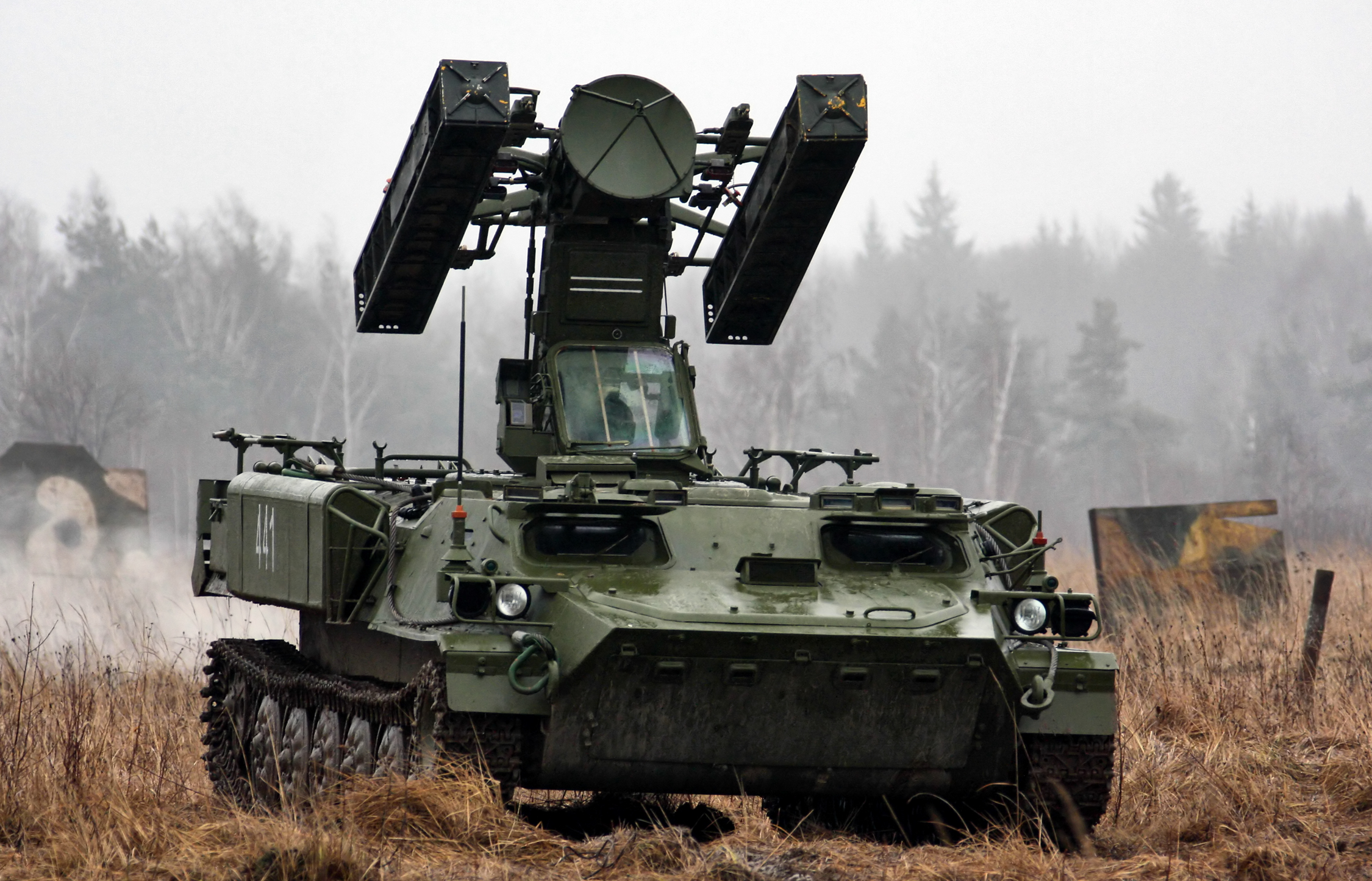

== See also ==
- 9K31 Strela-1
