= IT-1 =

Soviet missile tank/tank destroyer

IT-1 (tank)
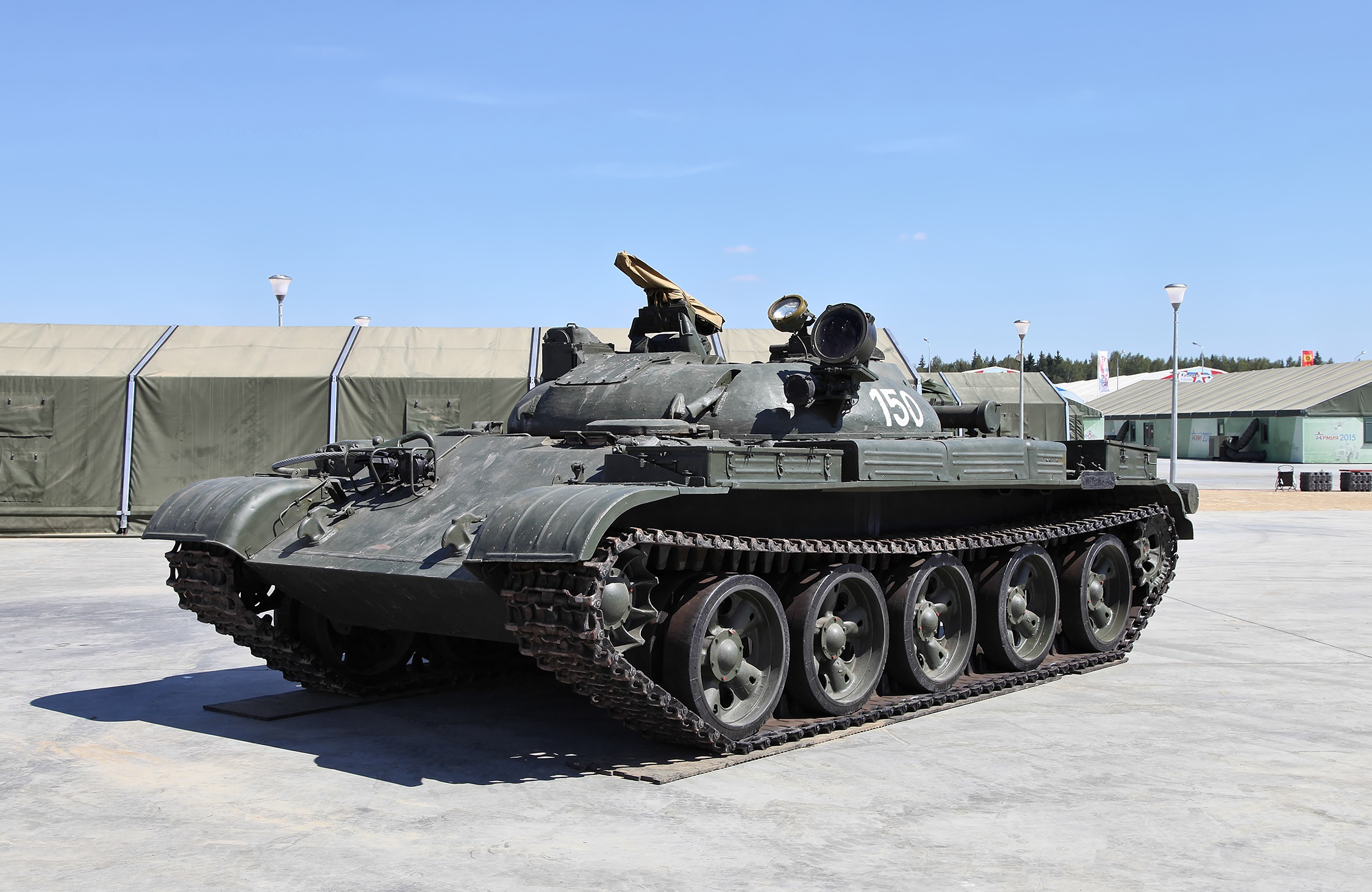
- Type: Missile tank Anti-tank missile carrier
- Place of origin: Soviet Union

Service history
- In service: 1968–1973
- Used by: Soviet Union

Production history
- Designer: A.E. Nudelman
- Manufacturer: Uralvagonzavod
- No. built: 220

Specifications
- Mass: 34.5 t (38.0 short tons; 34.0 long tons)
- Length: 6.63 m (21 ft 9 in)
- Width: 3.30 m (10 ft 10 in)
- Height: 2.20 m (7 ft 3 in)
- Crew: 3 (commander, driver, gunner)
- Armor: Cast turret 220 mm at 73 ° turret front 165 mm turret sides 30 to 58 mm turret roof 65 mm turret rear 102 mm at 30° hull front 16 to 30 mm hull roof 20 mm hull floor 80 mm at 90° hull sides
- Main armament: 2K4 Missile launcher (recharge of 15 3M7 Drakon anti-tank missiles)
- Secondary armament: 7.62 mm PKT coaxial general-purpose machine gun (2000 rounds)
- Engine: V-55 12-cylinder 4-stroke one-chamber 38.88 liter water-cooled diesel 581 hp (433 kW) at 2,000 rpm
- Power/weight: 14.5 hp/tonne (10.8 kW/tonne)
- Suspension: torsion bar
- Operational range: 391 km (243 mi) on road (650 km (400 mi) with two 200 L (53 US gal; 44 imp gal) extra fuel tanks)
- Maximum speed: 50 km/h (31 mph) (road); 35 km/h (22 mph) (cross country)

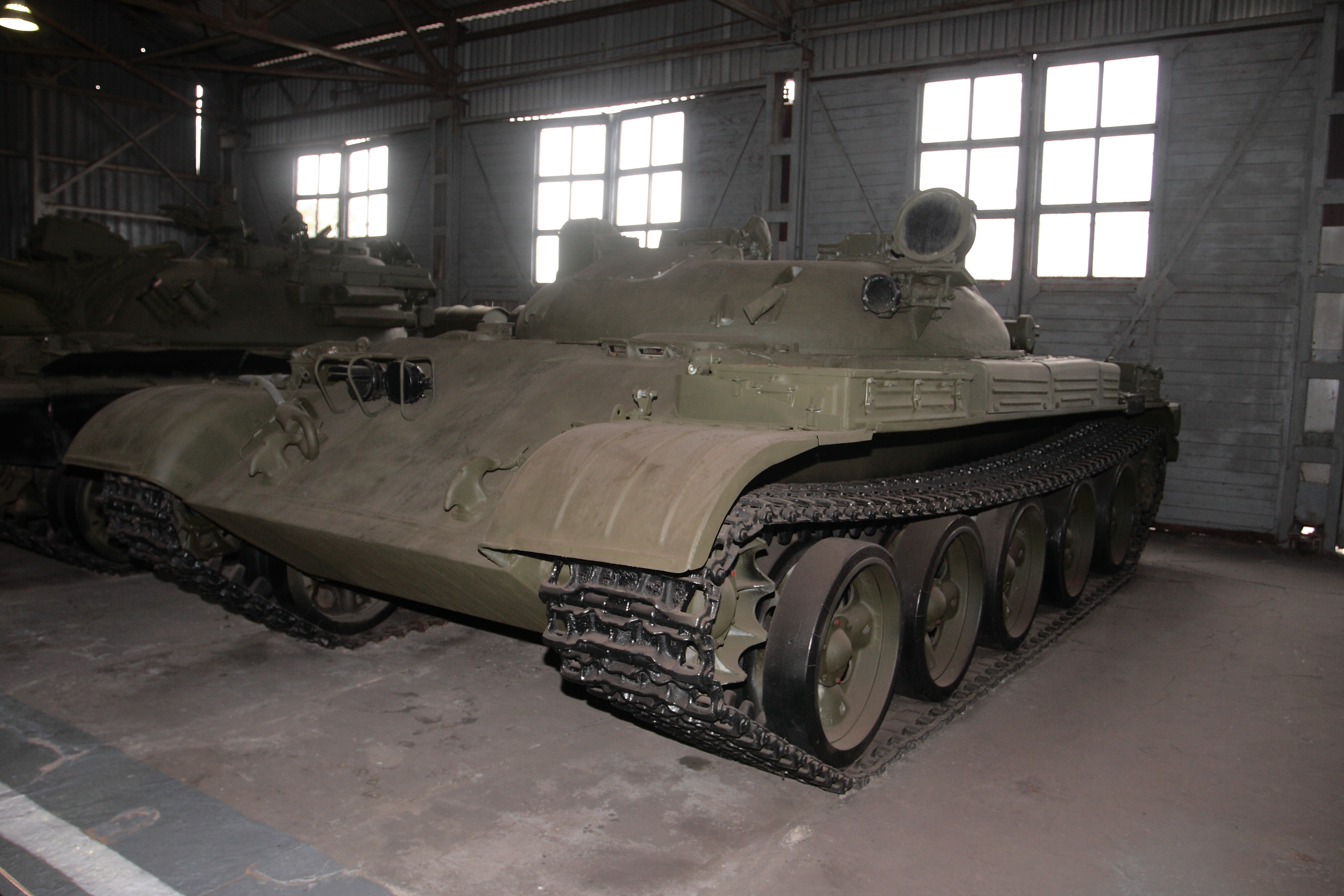
IT-1. Kubinka tank museum

The IT-1 (Russian: Истребитель танков–1 - 'Istrebitel tankov–1', lit. 'tank destroyer-1') was a Soviet Cold War missile tank based on the hull of the T-62. The tank fired specially designed 3M7 Drakon missiles from a pop-up launcher. It saw a very limited service between 1968 and 1970. The large deadzone around the tank created by the missiles' minimum range combined with the limited amount of ammunition carried made it unpopular with the military. Also, the 520 kg of guidance equipment needed for the missile was impractical. Eventually, the tanks were converted into recovery vehicles. A turbine-powered version was also developed named the IT-1T.

== History ==
Object 150 entered production in 1968 with 220 units made between 1968 and 1970. Its purpose was to provide additional firepower to T-62 tanks. It was designated the IT-1 tank destroyer and issued to battalions at Belarus and Carpathian Military Districts, crewed by tank crews and artillery crews respectively. A variant of the IT-1 was made with a turbine engine, designated the IT-1T. In the time period it spent in active-duty, it proved an unpopular vehicle. The low missile count did not sit well with the tank crews and the missiles had a dead zone of around 300–500 meters before the missiles could be guided. The IT-1 was also complicated to use and maintain compared to existing artillery vehicles, making it unpopular with the artillery crews. Though the missile launcher was praised for its long-range accuracy, the IT-1 was ill-suited for the overall military situation and was discontinued sometime after its deployment in 1972. The remaining missile tanks in inventory were converted to bts-4v recovery vehicles.

Though the missile tanks concept failed, many more attempts were made to incorporate a missile system as a secondary armament onto Soviet tanks, succeeding with the usage of missiles in the 125 mm smoothbore guns on Soviet tanks past the T-64.

== Description ==
The IT-1 had a crew of three, a driver, gunner and commander. It was armed with a pop-up missile launcher fitted into a low profile turret along with a 7.62 mm PKT machine gun with 2000 rounds of ammunition. Twelve 3M7 Drakon missiles were stored in an automatic loader and a further three were stored in an unarmoured box on the back of the turret. Every missile was stored in a storage container in the shape of a long rectangular box. Upon loading of a new missile, a hatch would open on the roof of the turret, with the missile being raised out of the turret by the autoloader. The storage container of the missile would then be jettisoned, allowing the 3M7 Drakon to extend its stabiliser fins, readying the weapon to be fired.

The missile was radio-command guided, using any one of seven frequencies and two codes. That prevented vehicles within a single unit interfering with each other. It was launched slightly upward, and at an angle to offset any wind drift during the first second of unguided flight. A tracer on the rear of the missile allowed the guidance system to track the missile and transmit radio commands to the missile. The commands were decoded by the missile and translated into deflection of the missiles fins. To ensure night combat capability, night-vision equipment was provided, but substantially reduced the missile's range.

== Specifications (3M7 Drakon missile) ==
- Guidance: Radio SACLOS.
- Weight: 54 kg
- Warhead: 5.8 kg HEAT
- Diameter: 150mm
- Wing span: 860 mm
- Length: 1240 mm
- Range:
  - 300 m to 3500 m (day)
  - 400 m to 900 m (night)
- Average Speed: 217 m/s (780 km/h)
- Max Speed: 224 m/s (804 km/h)
- Penetration: 250 mm versus RHA at 60 degrees

== See also ==
- Taifun, a prototype Russian missile tank system developed during the same period.
