= Taifun 9M15 =

Soviet anti-tank missile prototype

Taifun 9M15 (Russian: тайфу́н, typhoon) was a Soviet missile developed to arm the Object 287 tank based on the T-64 tank chassis. The tank was armed with two 73 mm (2.9 in) 2A25 low-pressure guns mounted either side of a retractable missile launcher. Both the guns and the missile launcher were automatically loaded, the guns each being fed from two eight round drums, giving a total of 32 guns rounds and 15 missiles stored in the tank. The missile launch platform was vertically stabilised, allowing the vehicle to move at low speed and still fire. The guns were remotely controlled by the gunner and commander from the front of the hull.

The Taifun missile had a body diameter of 140 mm. It was fitted with a dual purpose warhead with a HEAT shaped charge capable of penetrating 500 mm of armour, and a fragmentation effect roughly equivalent to a 100 mm HE-FRAG shell. The missile was MCLOS radio command guided from the tank. The missile had an engagement envelope of between 500 and 4000 m.

Tests were conducted in April 1964, during which the tank performed poorly, and as a result the tank and missile were not accepted for service.

== Specifications (Object 287) ==
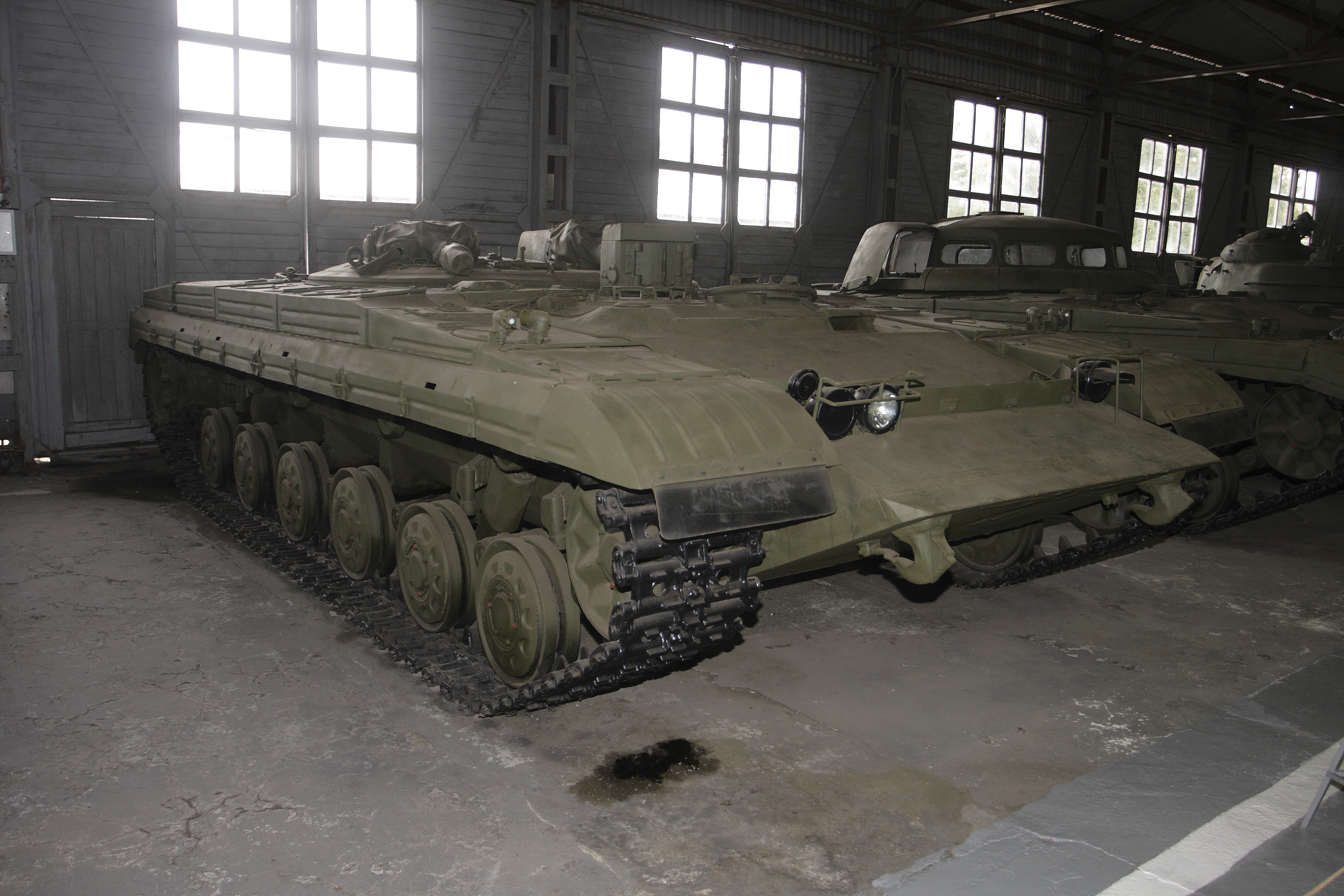
Object 287. Kubinka Tank Museum.

- Weight: 36.5 tons
- Length: 6.12 m
- Width: 3.42 m
- Height: 1.75 m
- Ground clearance 450 mm
- Armor:
  - Front hull: 100 - 200 mm
  - Front turret: 330 mm
- Armament:
  - 140 mm launcher with 15 x 9M15 Taifun missiles
  - 2 x 73 mm Smoothbore guns 32 rounds total.
  - 3000 x 7.62 mm
- Engine: 700 hp diesel
- Road range: 500 km
- ground pressure 0.8 kg/cm
- Obstacles :
  - Wall: 0.80 m
  - Trench: 2.70 m
  - Fording: 1.7 m

== See also ==
- IT-1, a Russian missile tank that saw limited service and was developed at around the same time.

== Bibliography ==
- Zaloga, Steven J. (2015). T-64 Battle Tank: The Cold War's Most Secret Tank. New Vanguard. Vol. 223. Oxford: Osprey Publishing. ISBN 978-1-4728-0628-4.
