= Bereznik =

Bereznik (Russian: Березник) is the name of several inhabited localities in Russia.

== Arkhangelsk Oblast ==
As of 2010, nineteen inhabited localities in Arkhangelsk Oblast bear this name.

Urban localities

- Bereznik, Vinogradovsky District, Arkhangelsk Oblast, a work settlement in Vinogradovsky District

Rural localities

- Bereznik, Khavrogorsky Selsoviet, Kholmogorsky District, Arkhangelsk Oblast, a village in Khavrogorsky Selsoviet of Kholmogorsky District
- Bereznik, Rakulsky Selsoviet, Kholmogorsky District, Arkhangelsk Oblast, a village in Rakulsky Selsoviet of Kholmogorsky District
- Bereznik, Revazhsky Selsoviet, Kotlassky District, Arkhangelsk Oblast, a village in Revazhsky Selsoviet of Kotlassky District
- Bereznik, Solvychegodsky Selsoviet, Kotlassky District, Arkhangelsk Oblast, a village in Solvychegodsky Selsoviet of Kotlassky District
- Bereznik, Krasnoborsky District, Arkhangelsk Oblast, a village in Belosludsky Selsoviet of Krasnoborsky District
- Bereznik, Lensky District, Arkhangelsk Oblast, a village in Kozminsky Selsoviet of Lensky District
- Bereznik, Leshukonsky District, Arkhangelsk Oblast, a village in Nisogorsky Selsoviet of Leshukonsky District
- Bereznik, Mezensky District, Arkhangelsk Oblast, a village in Kozmogorodsky Selsoviet of Mezensky District
- Bereznik, Pinezhsky Selsoviet, Pinezhsky District, Arkhangelsk Oblast, a village in Pinezhsky Selsoviet of Pinezhsky District
- Bereznik, Shotogorsky Selsoviet, Pinezhsky District, Arkhangelsk Oblast, a village in Shotogorsky Selsoviet of Pinezhsky District
- Bereznik, Trufanogorsky Selsoviet, Pinezhsky District, Arkhangelsk Oblast, a village in Trufanogorsky Selsoviet of Pinezhsky District
- Bereznik, Shenkursky District, Arkhangelsk Oblast, a village in Ust-Padengsky Selsoviet of Shenkursky District
- Bereznik, Bereznitsky Selsoviet, Ustyansky District, Arkhangelsk Oblast, a selo in Bereznitsky Selsoviet of Ustyansky District
- Bereznik, Minsky Selsoviet, Ustyansky District, Arkhangelsk Oblast, a village in Minsky Selsoviet of Ustyansky District
- Bereznik, Poponavolotsky Selsoviet, Velsky District, Arkhangelsk Oblast, a village in Poponavolotsky Selsoviet of Velsky District
- Bereznik, Rakulo-Kokshengsky Selsoviet, Velsky District, Arkhangelsk Oblast, a village in Rakulo-Kokshengsky Selsoviet of Velsky District
- Bereznik, Shadrengsky Selsoviet, Velsky District, Arkhangelsk Oblast, a village in Shadrengsky Selsoviet of Velsky District
- Bereznik, Vilegodsky District, Arkhangelsk Oblast, a village in Ilyinsky Selsoviet of Vilegodsky District

== Belgorod Oblast ==
As of 2010, one rural locality in Belgorod Oblast bears this name:

- Bereznik, Belgorod Oblast, a khutor in Prokhorovsky District

== Kirov Oblast ==
As of 2010, five rural localities in Kirov Oblast bear this name:

- Bereznik, Bereznikovsky Rural Okrug, Kumyonsky District, Kirov Oblast, a selo in Bereznikovsky Rural Okrug of Kumyonsky District
- Bereznik, Kumensky Rural Okrug, Kumyonsky District, Kirov Oblast, a village in Kumensky Rural Okrug of Kumyonsky District
- Bereznik, Orlovsky District, Kirov Oblast, a village in Podgorodny Rural Okrug of Orlovsky District
- Bereznik, Slobodskoy District, Kirov Oblast, a village in Ozernitsky Rural Okrug of Slobodskoy District
- Bereznik, Zuyevsky District, Kirov Oblast, a village in Oktyabrsky Rural Okrug of Zuyevsky District

== Komi Republic ==
As of 2010, one rural locality in the Komi Republic bears this name:

- Bereznik, Komi Republic, a village in Yb Selo Administrative Territory of Syktyvdinsky District

== Kostroma Oblast ==
As of 2010, one rural locality in Kostroma Oblast bears this name:

- Bereznik, Kostroma Oblast, a village under the administrative jurisdiction of the town of district significance of Kologriv in Kologrivsky District

== Kursk Oblast ==
As of 2010, one rural locality in Kursk Oblast bears this name:

- Bereznik, Kursk Oblast, a settlement in Melekhinsky Selsoviet of Shchigrovsky District

== Novgorod Oblast ==
As of 2010, three rural localities in Novgorod Oblast bear this name:

- Bereznik, Borovichsky District, Novgorod Oblast, a village in Progresskoye Settlement of Borovichsky District
- Bereznik, Pesotskoye Settlement, Demyansky District, Novgorod Oblast, a village in Pesotskoye Settlement of Demyansky District
- Bereznik, Zhirkovskoye Settlement, Demyansky District, Novgorod Oblast, a village in Zhirkovskoye Settlement of Demyansky District

== Perm Krai ==
As of 2010, four rural localities in Perm Krai bear this name:

- Bereznik, Chusovoy, Perm Krai, a village under the administrative jurisdiction of the town of krai significance of Chusovoy
- Bereznik, Beryozovsky District, Perm Krai, a village in Beryozovsky District
- Bereznik, Okhansky District, Perm Krai, a village in Okhansky District
- Bereznik, Permsky District, Perm Krai, a village in Permsky District

== Vologda Oblast ==
As of 2010, eight rural localities in Vologda Oblast bear this name:

- Bereznik, Antushevsky Selsoviet, Belozersky District, Vologda Oblast, a village in Antushevsky Selsoviet of Belozersky District
- Bereznik, Gulinsky Selsoviet, Belozersky District, Vologda Oblast, a village in Gulinsky Selsoviet of Belozersky District
- Bereznik, Ferapontovsky Selsoviet, Kirillovsky District, Vologda Oblast, a village in Ferapontovsky Selsoviet of Kirillovsky District
- Bereznik, Kovarzinsky Selsoviet, Kirillovsky District, Vologda Oblast, a village in Kovarzinsky Selsoviet of Kirillovsky District
- Bereznik, Sheksninsky District, Vologda Oblast, a village in Kameshnikovsky Selsoviet of Sheksninsky District
- Bereznik, Tarnogsky District, Vologda Oblast, a village in Shebengsky Selsoviet of Tarnogsky District
- Bereznik, Vashkinsky District, Vologda Oblast, a village in Roksomsky Selsoviet of Vashkinsky District
- Bereznik, Vologodsky District, Vologda Oblast, a village in Bereznikovsky Selsoviet of Vologodsky District
