= Sergey Ilyushin =

Soviet aircraft designer (1894–1977)

- Сергей Ильюшин
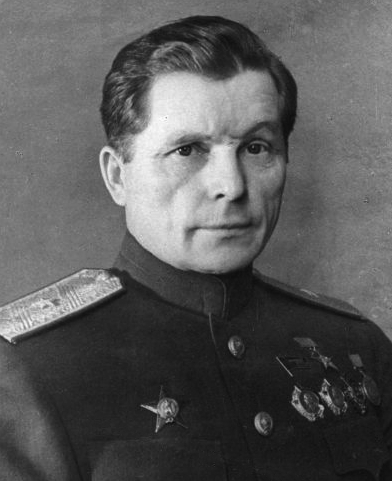
- Ilyushin in 1945
- Born: 30 March 1894; Dilyalevo, Russia
- Died: 9 February 1977 (aged 82); Moscow, Soviet Union
- Resting place: Novodevichy Cemetery, Moscow
- Children: Vladimir Ilyushin
- Engineering career
- Discipline: Aeronautical Engineering
- Employer: Ilyushin design bureau
- Significant design: DB-3, Il-2, Il-4, Il-10, Il-12, Il-14, Il-18, Il-22, Il-38, Il-62, Il-76, Il-86

Signature
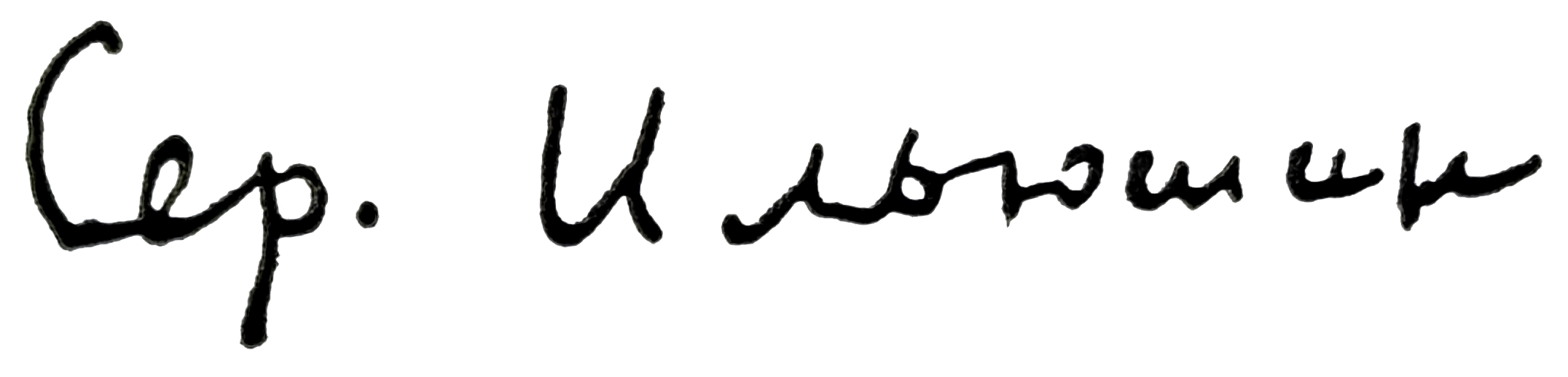

Sergey Vladimirovich Ilyushin (Russian: Сергей Владимирович Ильюшин; 30 March [O.S. 18 March] 1894 – 9 February 1977) was a Soviet aircraft designer who founded the Ilyushin aircraft design bureau. He designed the Il-2 Shturmovik, which made its maiden flight in 1939. It is the most produced warplane, and remains the second most-produced aircraft in history, with some 36,000+ built, behind the US Cessna 172.

== Biography ==
=== Early years ===
Born on 30 March [O.S. 18 March] 1894 in the village of Dilyalevo, the youngest of 11 children born to a Russian peasant family, the largely self-taught Ilyushin left home at an early age. He worked as a factory laborer, ditch-digger at construction sites, and cleaner of gutters at a dye plant in Saint Petersburg. In 1910, he learned that jobs were available at Kolomyazhsky Racetrack as a groundskeeper. The racetrack was also the site of the first All-Russia Festival of Ballooning in autumn of 1910, and Ilyushin assisted in unpacking crates and setting up equipment. He was also able to meet many of Russia's pioneer aviators, an event that awoke his interest in aviation.

In 1911 he returned to his native village to work as a carter of a dairy plant. The following year, he worked as a construction worker for the Amur Railway, and in 1913 he was in Tallinn as a worker in a shipyard.

With the outbreak of World War I in 1914, Ilyushin was conscripted into the Imperial Russian Army, serving with the infantry, and later (as he was literate) as a clerk in the military administration of Vologda. When a request came for seven volunteers to serve in the fledgling Aviation Section, he was quick to volunteer. He worked at first as a mechanic and member of the ground crew. In the summer of 1917, he was qualified as a pilot.

In March 1918, with the withdrawal of the Bolshevik government from the war, Ilyushin was demobilized and sent back to his native village. He helped supervise the increasing nationalization of factories in the area and in October 1918 joined the Bolshevik Party. With the Russian Civil War, Ilyushin was drafted into the Red Army in May 1919, working as aviation technician of VVS RKKA (Red Army). That autumn, a White movement Avro 504 biplane made a forced landing near Petrozavodsk. Ilyushin led a team which dismantled it, and sent it to Moscow where it was reverse-engineered into the U-1 trainer, of which 737 examples were subsequently built.

=== Work in aviation ===
In the autumn of 1921 Ilyushin left military service; he entered the Institute of Engineers of the Red Air Fleet (renamed the Zhukovsky Air Force Engineering Academy on 9 September 1922) on 21 September 1921. During his student years he concentrated on the design of gliders, taking part in numerous competitions. In 1925 one of his designs was sent to a competition in Germany, where it took first prize for flight time. Ilyushin obtained a degree in engineering in 1926 and served until November 1931 as an aeroplanes section manager within the Soviet Air Force Scientific-Technical Committee, with involvement in the development of the design requirements for the new aeroplanes of Nikolai Polikarpov and Andrei Tupolev. This time he was also appointed Assistant Chief of the Air Force Research and Test Institute. Upon his own request in November 1931 he was reassigned to TsAGI Design Bureau and worked there till 1933. In 1933 Ilyushin became chief of the TsKB at the V.R. Menzhinski Moscow plant which later grew into the Ilyushin OKB (the bureau behind all Soviet aircraft abbreviated IL-#, a military- and civil-aviation supergiant and major global brand) in 1935.

His single-engined Ilyushin Il-2 ground-attack aircraft, the single most-produced combat aircraft design in history (with 36,183 examples), and the Ilyushin Il-4 twin-engined bomber (of which just over 5,200 examples were built) were used extensively in World War II, on all fronts where the Soviets fought.

After the war, Ilyushin concentrated primarily on commercial airliners, such as the Ilyushin Il-18 and Ilyushin Il-62, which saw extensive use with Aeroflot and with numerous Soviet client states. In 1967 he was given the honorary rank of General-Colonel of Engineering/Technical Service. He became an Academician of the Academy of Sciences of the Soviet Union in 1968. He remained the chief designer at the Ilyushin OKB until his retirement due to illness in 1970.

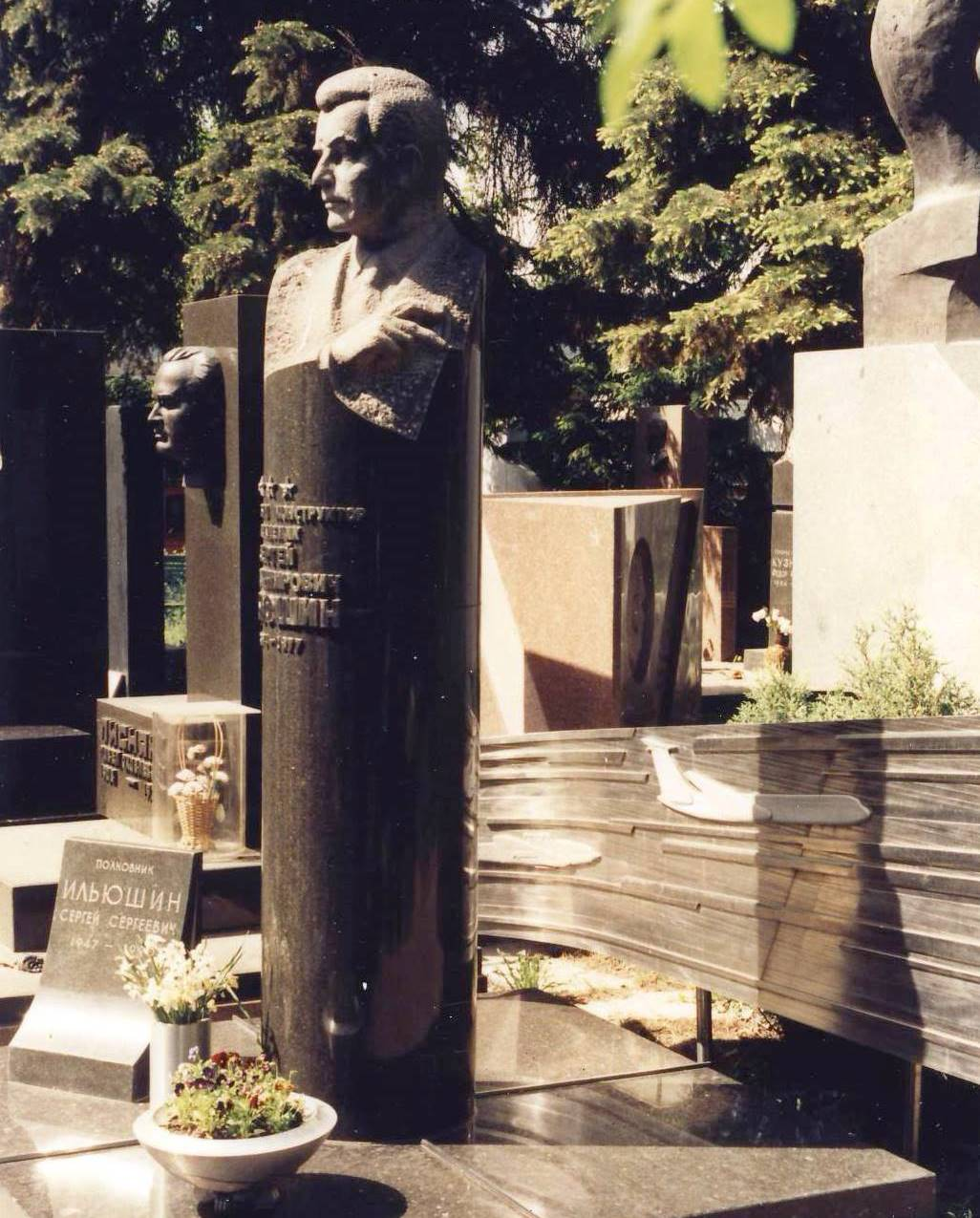
Sergey Ilyushin's grave at Novodevichy cemetery, Moscow

From 1937 to 1970 Ilyushin also served as a deputy of the Supreme Soviet of the Soviet Union. He died in 1977 in Moscow and was buried in the Novodevichy Cemetery.

== Awards and honors ==
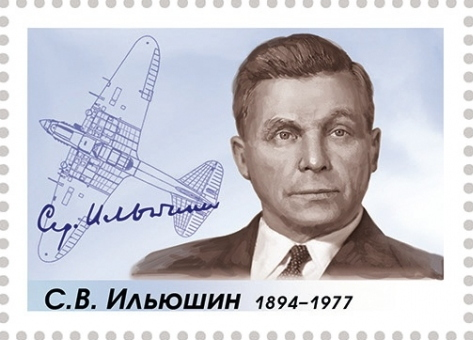
Ilyushin on a 2019 stamp of Russia

- Hero of Socialist Labour (1941, 1957, 1974)
- Stalin Prize second degree (1941, 1952)
- Stalin Prize first degree (1942, 1943, 1946, 1947, 1950)
- USSR State Prize (1971)
- Lenin Prize (1960)
- Order of Lenin (1937, 1941, 1945, twice in 1954, 1964, 1971, 1974)
- Order of Suvorov 1st and the 2nd class (1945, 1944)
- Order of the October Revolution (1969)
- Order of the Red Banner (1944, 1950)
- Order of the Red Banner of Labour (1939)
- Order of the Red Star (1933, 1967)
- International Air & Space Hall of Fame inductee (2006).

== Family ==
- His first wife was Raisa Mikhailovna Zhalkovskaya (1897-1972). They were married in Vologda on June 4, 1919.
- A daughter from her first marriage, Irina Sergeevna Ilyushina (by her husband, Orekhovich, 1920-2007), was married to the vice—president of the AMN Orekhovich.
- Son from his first marriage — Ilyushin, Vladimir Sergeevich (1927-2010) — test pilot, Hero of the Soviet Union.
- His second wife, Anastasia Vasilyevna Sovetova (1915-2008), was a design engineer.
- Son from the second marriage — Sergey Sergeyevich Ilyushin (1947-1990) — engineer.
- Son from his second marriage — Alexander Sergeyevich Ilyushin (born 1955);
  - grandson - Sergey Alexandrovich Ilyushin (1985-2002).

== Memory ==
- The house in which S. V. Ilyushin lived during summer vacations in the 1950s and 1970s has been preserved in the village of Dilyalevo.
- In the village of Mozhaiskoye (12 kilometers from Vologda), the House Museum of Alexander Mozhaysky has an extensive exposition dedicated to the life and work of S. V. Ilyushin.
- Materials about the life and work of S. V. Ilyushin are presented in the Hall of Military Glory of the Kubenskoye Regional Museum of Local Lore.
- Bronze busts of S. V. Ilyushin were installed in Vologda (at the intersection of Mira and Blagoveshchenskaya Streets, opened on January 17, 1977 by sculptor O. M. Maziner, architect I. Rozhin) and in Moscow.
- Streets in Moscow, St. Petersburg, Voronezh, Vologda, Tyumen, and Kubenskoye are named after Ilyushin.
- In 1984, a postage stamp of the USSR dedicated to Ilyushin was issued (timed to coincide with the 90th anniversary of his birth); in 2019— the postal block of Russia.
- In 1984, a monument IL-28 was erected in Vologda on Ilyushin Street, dedicated to its creator, Sergei Vladimirovich Ilyushin.
- On May 8, 2020 a monument to S. V. Ilyushin was unveiled in the village of Bereznik.

== See also ==
- His son Vladimir Ilyushin
