= Ilyushin Il-2 =

Soviet ground attack aircraft of WWII

Il-2 Shturmovik
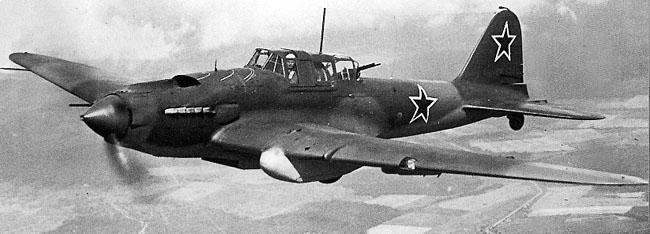
- A Soviet Air Force Ilyushin Il-2M in flight

General information
- Type: Ground-attack aircraft
- National origin: Soviet Union
- Designer: Ilyushin
- Built by: State Aviation Factory No. 1; State Aviation Factory No. 18; State Aviation Factory No. 381
- Primary users: Soviet Air Force: Hungarian Air Force; Air Force of the Polish Army; Yugoslav Air Force
- Number built: 36,183

History
- Manufactured: 1941–1945
- Introduction date: 1941
- First flight: 2 October 1939
- Retired: 1954 (Bulgarian Air Force & Yugoslav Air Force)
- Developed into: Ilyushin Il-10

The Ilyushin Il-2 (Russian: Илью́шин Ил-2) is a ground-attack plane that was produced by the Soviet Union in large numbers during the Second World War. The word shturmovík (Russian: штурмовик), the generic Russian term for a ground-attack aircraft, became a synecdoche for the Il-2 in English sources, where it is commonly rendered Shturmovik, Stormovik and Sturmovik.

To Il-2 pilots, the aircraft was known by the diminutive "Ilyusha". To the soldiers on the ground, it was called the "Hunchback", the "Flying Tank" or the "Flying Infantryman". Its postwar NATO reporting name was Bark.

During the war, 36,183 units of the Il-2 were produced, and in combination with its successor, the Ilyushin Il-10, a total of 42,330 were built, making it the single most produced military aircraft design in aviation history, as well as one of the most produced piloted aircraft in history along with the American postwar civilian Cessna 172 and the German contemporary Messerschmitt Bf 109.

The Il-2 played a crucial role on the Eastern Front. When factories fell behind on deliveries, Joseph Stalin told the factory managers that the Il-2s were "as essential to the Red Army as air and bread".

== Design and development ==
=== Origins ===
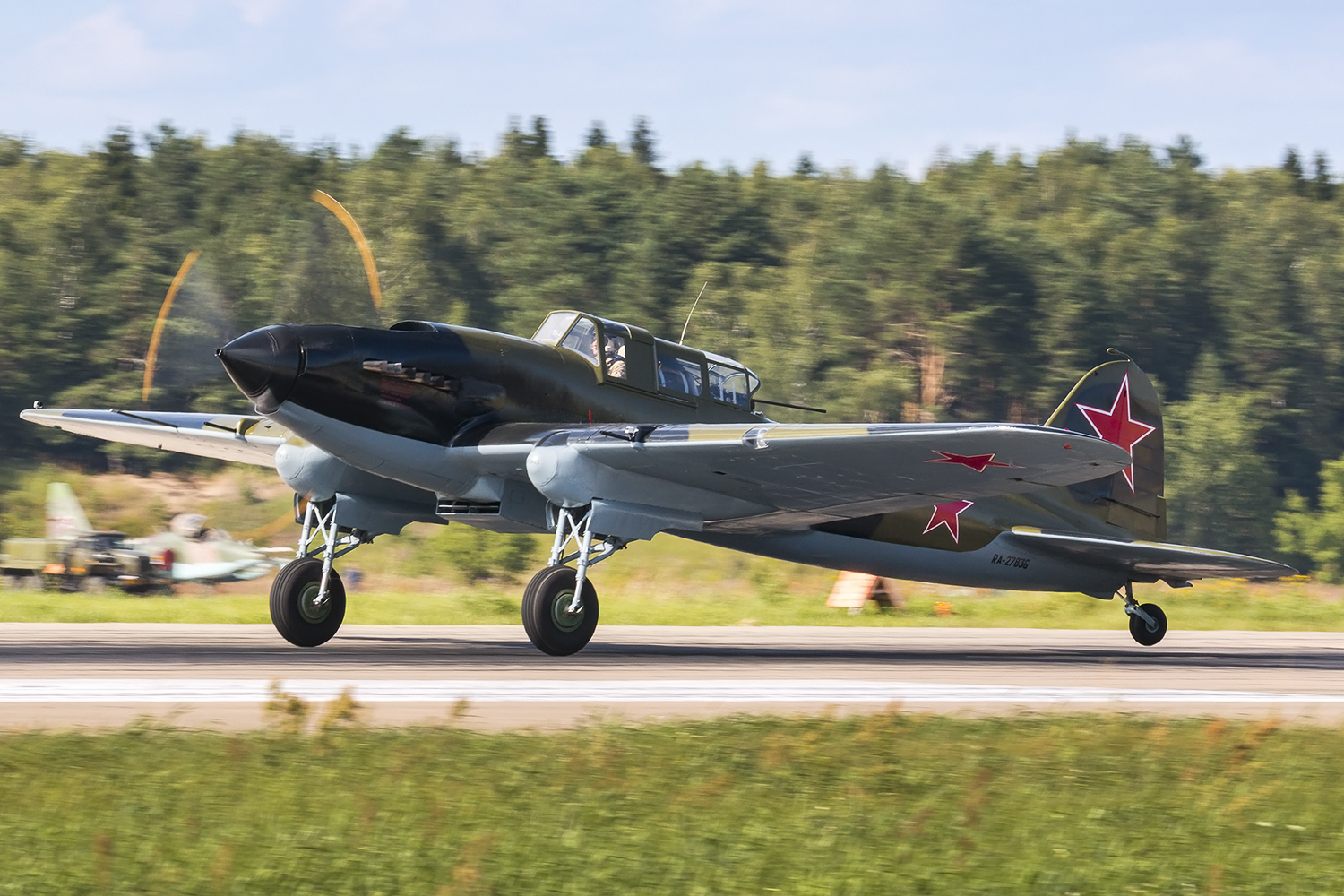
Il-2M at MAKS air show

The idea for a Soviet armored ground-attack aircraft dates to the early 1930s, when Dmitry Pavlovich Grigorovich designed TSh-1 and TSh-2 armored biplanes. However, Soviet engines at the time lacked the power needed to provide the heavy aircraft with good performance. The Il-2 was designed by Sergey Ilyushin and his team at the Central Design Bureau in 1938. TsKB-55 was a two-seat aircraft with an armoured shell weighing 700 kg (1,500 lb), protecting crew, engine, radiators, and the fuel tank. Standing loaded, the Ilyushin weighed more than 4,700 kg (10,400 lb), making the armoured shell about 15% of the aircraft's gross weight. Uniquely for a World War II attack aircraft, and similarly to the forward fuselage design of the World War I-era Imperial German Junkers J.I armored, all-metal biplane, the Il-2's armor was designed as a load-bearing part of the Ilyushin's monocoque structure, thus saving considerable weight. The prototype TsKB-55, which first flew on 2 October 1939, won the government competition against the Sukhoi Su-6 and received the VVS designation BSh-2 (the BSh stood for "Bronirovani Shturmovik" or armoured ground attack). The prototypes – TsKB-55 and TskB-57 – were built at Moscow plant #39, at that time the Ilyushin design bureau's base.

The BSh-2 was overweight and underpowered, with the original Mikulin AM-35 1,022 kW (1,371 hp) engine designed to give its greatest power outputs at high altitude. Because of this, it was redesigned as the TsKB-57, a lighter single-seat design with the more powerful 1,254 kW (1,682 hp) Mikulin AM-38 engine, a development of the AM-35 optimised for low-level operation. The TsKB-57 first flew on 12 October 1940. The production aircraft passed State Acceptance Trials in March 1941, and was redesignated Il-2 in April. Deliveries to operational units commenced in May 1941.

The 23 mm (0.91 in) armament of Il-2 was subject to a competition. One of the first 1940 photographs of the Il-2 show it equipped with two MP-6 23 mm autocannons developed by Yakov Taubin (Яков Таубин) at OKB-16. The MP-6 gun weighed 70 kg (150 lb) and developed an initial muzzle velocity of 900 m/s (3,000 ft/s). It operated on the short recoil principle and had a rate of fire of about 600 rpm. (The development of the MP-6 gun can be traced back to 1937. The initial version was tested in the spring of 1940 on a Messerschmitt Bf 110 bought from Germany, because there was no suitable Soviet aircraft on which to mount it. In the summer of 1940 it was tested on the Pashinin I-21.) Factory trials of the MP-6 gun on the Il-2 were conducted in August 1940. In the early Il-2 prototypes, these guns were fed by 81-round clips. In flight, these clips sometimes became dislodged because of their large surface, which caused them to experience significant aerodynamic pressure. Competitive tests were conducted in the spring of 1941 between the MP-6 gun modified to belt-fed and the newly developed, gas-operated Volkov-Yartsev VYa-23, which had otherwise rather similar characteristics. The VYa-23 was declared the winner at this trial. Subsequently, in May 1941, development of the MP-6 gun was terminated. Taubin was arrested and summarily executed in October that year for plotting to continue production of his failed weapon.

=== Technical description ===
The Il-2 is a single-engine, propeller-driven, low-wing monoplane of mixed construction with a crew of two (one in early versions), specially designed for assault operations. Its most notable feature was the inclusion of armor in an airframe load-bearing scheme. Armor plates replaced the frame and paneling throughout the nacelle and middle part of the fuselage, and an armored hull made of riveted homogeneous armor steel AB-1 (AB-2) secured the aircraft's engine, cockpit, water and oil radiators, and fuel tanks.

The extreme survivability of the Il-2 Sturmovik—frequently termed the "Flying Tank"—was made possible by a revolutionary approach to armored protection engineered by VIAM metallurgists Sergey T. Kishkin and Nikolai M. Sklyarov. Rather than simply bolting heavy armor plates onto an existing airframe, Kishkin and Sklyarov designed a load-bearing, highly complex armored shell made of heterogeneous and homogeneous steel plates that functioned simultaneously as the aircraft's forward structural fuselage and fuel tank protection. This armor could deflect high-explosive and armor-piercing rounds from German autocannons without shattering.

=== Production ===
In early 1941, the Il-2 was ordered into production at four factories, and was eventually produced in greater numbers than any other military aircraft in aviation history, but by the time Nazi Germany invaded the Soviet Union on 22 June 1941, only State Aviation Factory No. 18 at Voronezh and Factory No. 381 at Leningrad had commenced production, with 249 having been built by the time of the German attack.

Production early in the war was slow because after the German invasion the aircraft factories near Moscow and other major cities in western Russia had to be moved east of the Ural Mountains. Ilyushin and his engineers had time to reconsider production methods, and two months after the move Il-2s were again being produced. The tempo was not to Premier Stalin's liking, however, and he issued the following telegram to Shenkman and Tretyakov:

You have let down our country and our Red Army. You have the nerve not to manufacture IL-2s until now. Our Red Army now needs IL-2 aircraft like the air it breathes, like the bread it eats. Shenkman produces one IL-2 a day, and Tretyakov builds one or two MiG-3s daily. It is a mockery of our country and the Red Army. I ask you not to try the government's patience, and demand that you manufacture more ILs. This is my final warning.

— Stalin

As a result, "the production of Shturmoviks rapidly gained speed. Stalin's notion of the Il-2 being 'like bread' to the Red Army took hold in Ilyushin's aircraft plants, and the army soon had their Shturmoviks available in quantity."

State Aviation Factory No. 1, which was evacuated from Moscow to Kuibyshev (now Samara), came online in October 1941 and would ultimately produce 11,863 Il-2s over four years while also producing smaller numbers of MiG-3s and the Il-2s successor, the Il-10, at the same factory.

== Operational history ==
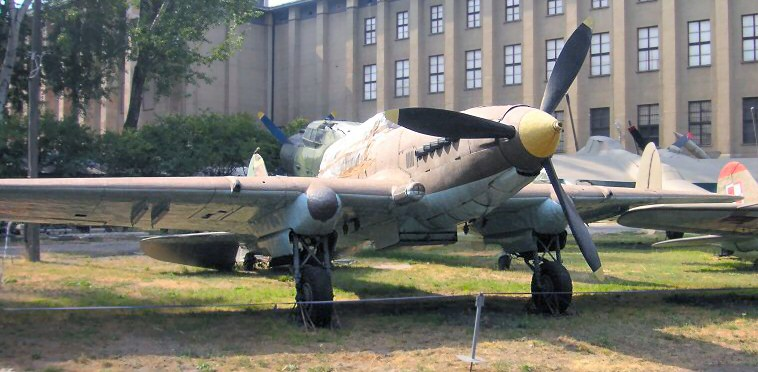
Il-2 in Museum of the Polish Army in Warsaw

=== Initial use and operational confusion ===
The first use in action of the Il-2 was with the 4th ShAP (Ground Attack Regiment) over the Berezina River days after German invasion began. The aircraft was so new that the pilots had no training in flight characteristics or tactics, and the ground crew no training in servicing or re-arming. The training received enabled the pilots only to take-off and land; none of the pilots had fired the armament, let alone learned tactics. There were 249 Il-2s available on 22 June 1941. In the first three days, 4th ShAP had lost 10 Il-2s to enemy action, a further 19 were lost to other causes, and 20 pilots were killed. By 10 July, 4th ShAP was down to 10 aircraft from a strength of 65.

=== New tactics ===
Tactics improved as Soviet aircrews became used to the Il-2's strengths. Instead of a low horizontal straight approach at 50 metres (160 ft) altitude, the target was usually kept to the pilot's left and a turn and shallow dive of 30 degrees was used, using an echeloned assault by four to twelve aircraft at a time. Although the Il-2's RS-82 and RS-132 rockets could destroy armored vehicles with one hit, they were so inaccurate that experienced Il-2 pilots mainly used the cannon. Another potent weapon of the Il-2 were high-explosive anti-tank (HEAT) shaped charge bomblets named protivotankovaya aviabomba (PTAB, "anti-tank aviation bomb"). They were designated PTAB-2.5-1.5, as they had a total weight of 2.5 kg (5.5 lb), and an explosive charge of 1.5 kg (3.3 lb). Up to 192 were carried in four external dispensers (cluster bombs) or up to 220 in the inner wing panels' internal ventral weapon bays. The charge could easily penetrate the relatively thin upper armor of all heavy German tanks. PTABs were first used on a large scale in the Battle of Kursk.

The Il-2 was thereafter deployed widely on the Eastern Front. The aircraft could fly in low light conditions and carried weapons able to defeat the thick armor of the Panther and Tiger I tanks.

=== Effectiveness as attack aircraft ===
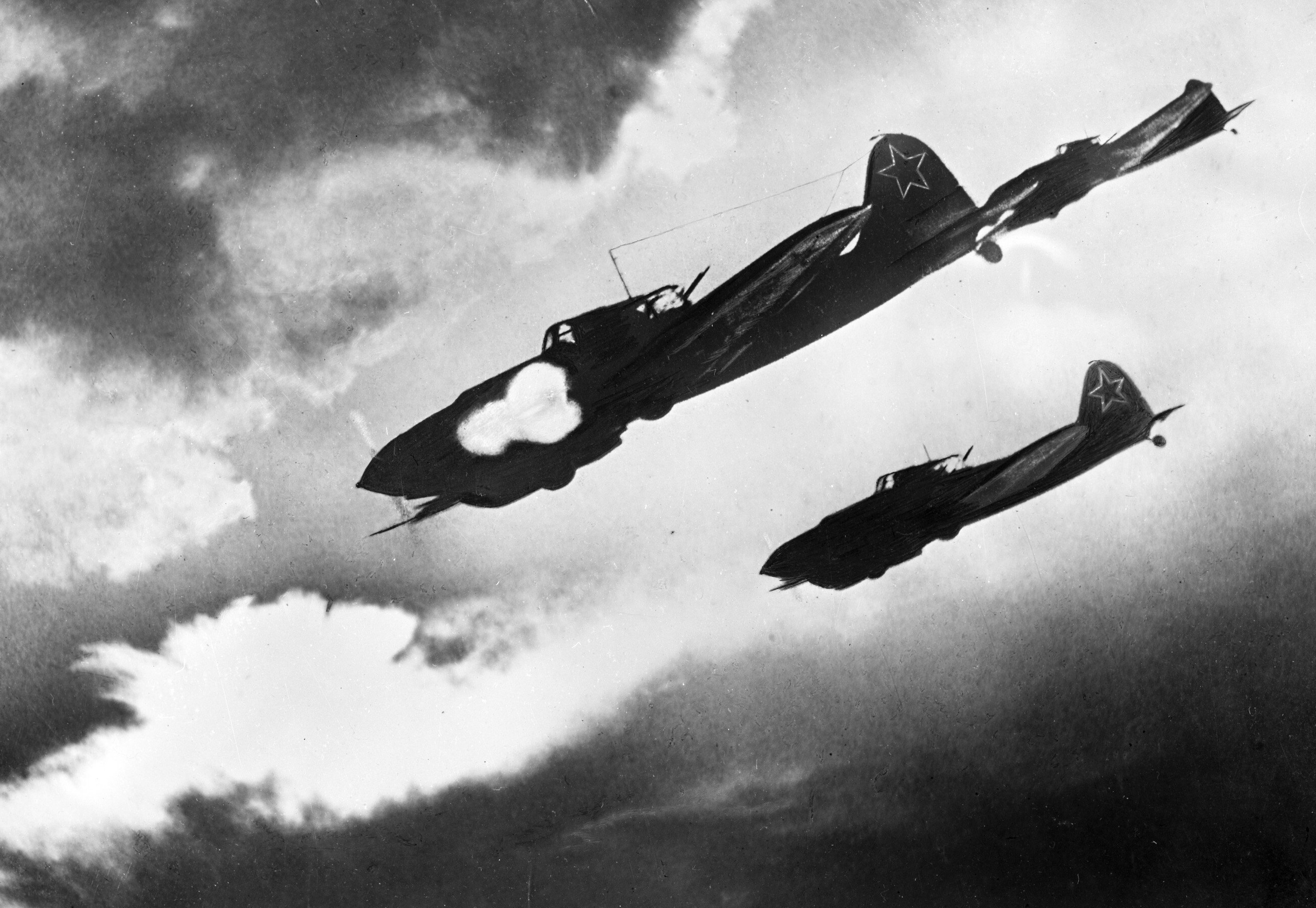
Soviet Il-2 planes attacking a German column during the Battle of Kursk

The true capabilities of the Il-2 are difficult to determine from existing documentary evidence. W. Liss in Aircraft profile 88: Ilyushin Il-2 mentions an engagement during the Battle of Kursk on 7 July 1943, in which 70 tanks from the German 9th Panzer Division were claimed to be destroyed by Ilyushin Il-2s in just 20 minutes. In another report of the action on the same day, a Soviet staff publication states that:

Ground forces highly valued the work of aviation on the battlefield. In a number of instances enemy attacks were thwarted thanks to our air operations. Thus on 7 July enemy tank attacks were disrupted in the Kashara region (13th Army). Here our assault aircraft delivered three powerful attacks in groups of 20–30, which resulted in the destruction and disabling of 34 tanks. The enemy was forced to halt further attacks and to withdraw the remnants of his force north of Kashara.

— Glantz and Orenstein 1999, p. 260.

In the Battle of Kursk (Operation Citadel), General V. Ryazanov became a master in the use of attack aircraft en masse, developing and improving the tactics of Il-2 operations in co-ordination with infantry, artillery and armored troops. Il-2s at Kursk used the "circle of death" tactic: up to eight Shturmoviks formed a defensive circle, each plane protecting the one ahead with its forward machine guns, while individual Il-2s took turns leaving the circle, attacking a target, and rejoining the circle. Ryazanov was later awarded the Gold Star of Hero of Soviet Union twice, and the 1st Assault Aviation Corps under his command became the first unit to be awarded the honorific title of Guards. In 1943, one aircraft was lost for every 26 Shturmovik sorties. About half of those lost were shot down by fighters, the rest falling to anti-aircraft fire.

Other studies of the fighting at Kursk suggest that very few of German armour losses were caused by the IL-2 or any other Soviet aircraft. In fact, total German tank losses in Operation Citadel amounted to 323 destroyed, the vast majority by anti-tank guns and armored fighting vehicles. In addition, it is difficult to find any first-hand accounts by German panzer crews on the Eastern Front describing anything more than the occasional loss to direct air attack. The vast majority, around 95–98%, of tank losses were due to enemy anti-tank guns, tanks, mines, artillery, and infantry assault, or simply abandonment as operational losses (due to causes such as mechanical breakdown or running out of fuel), which mostly happened during the last eleven months of the war.

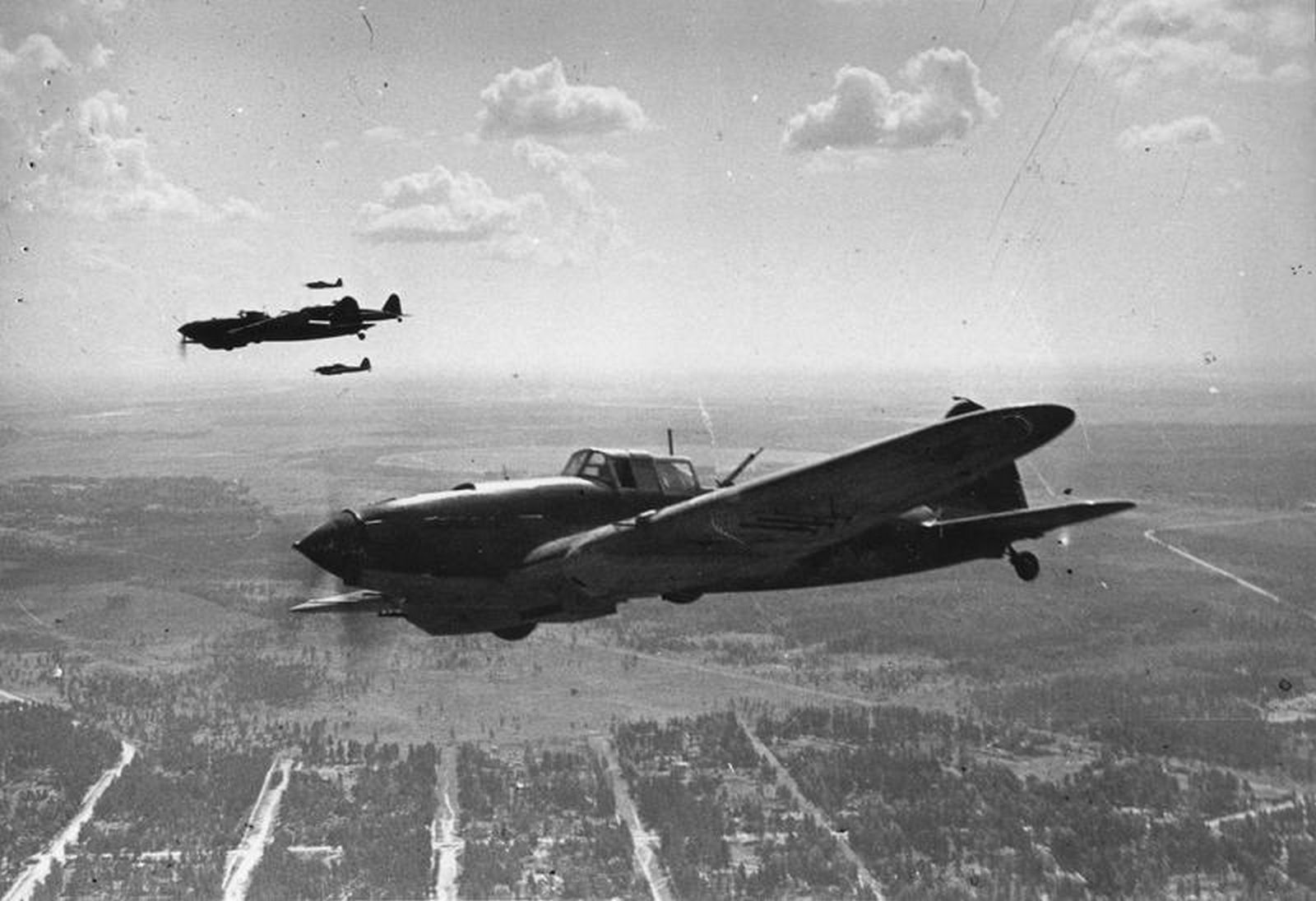
Il-2s banking towards targets in the vicinity of Leningrad, 1943

During the Battle of Kursk, VVS Il-2s claimed the destruction of no less than 270 tanks (and 2,000 men) in a period of just two hours against the 3rd Panzer Division. On 1 July, however, the 3rd Panzer Division's 6th Panzer Regiment had just 90 tanks, 180 fewer than claimed as destroyed. On 11 July (well after the battle), the 3rd Panzer Division still had 41 operational tanks. The 3rd Panzer Division continued fighting throughout July, mostly with 48th Panzer Corps. It did not record any extraordinary losses to air attack throughout this period. As with the other panzer divisions at Kursk, the large majority of the 3rd Panzer Division's tank losses were due to dug-in Soviet anti-tank guns and tanks.

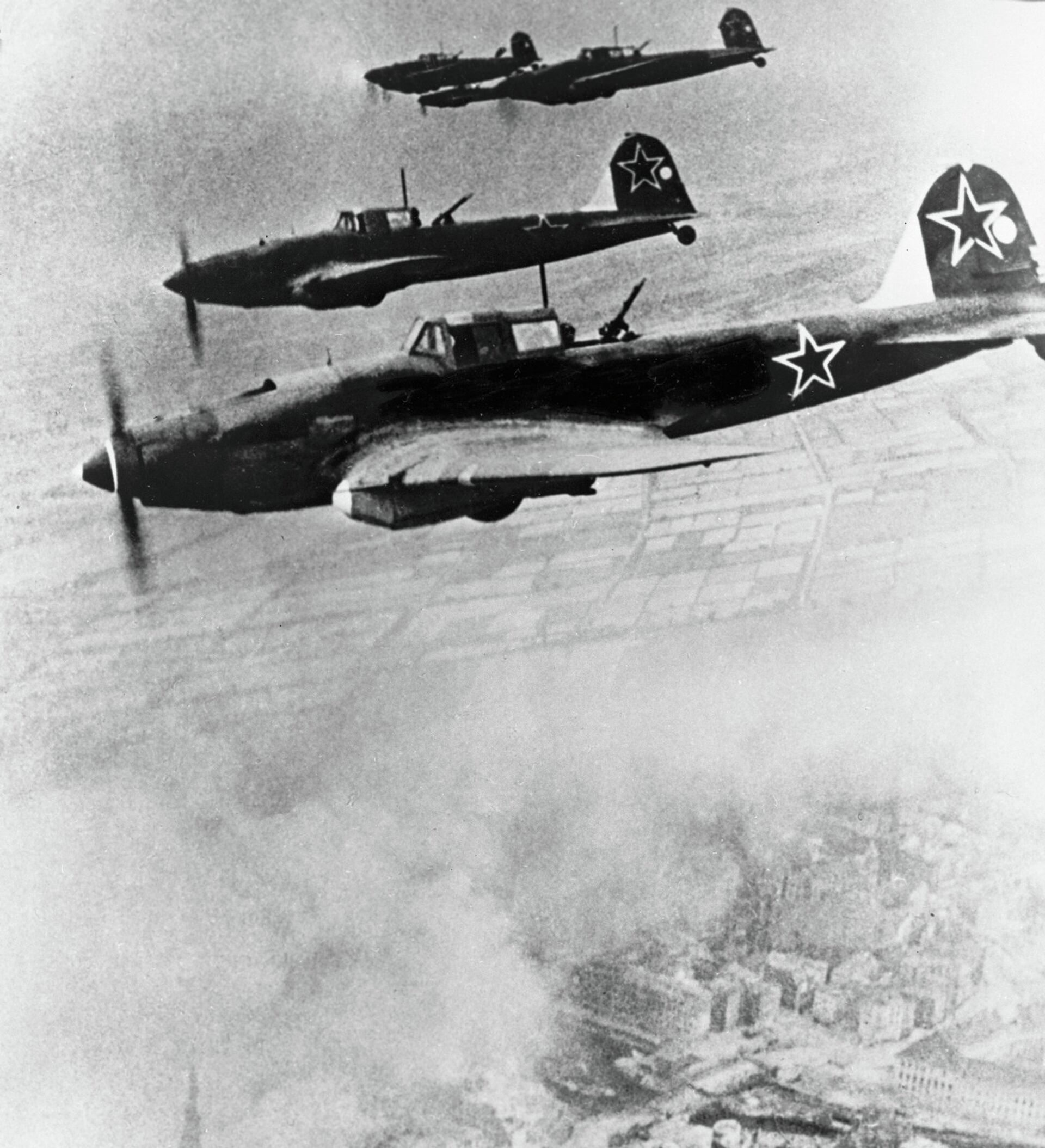
Il-2s flying towards Berlin, 1 May 1945

Perhaps the most extraordinary claim by the VVS's Il-2s is that, over a period of four hours, they destroyed 240 tanks and in the process virtually wiped out the 17th Panzer Division. On 1 July, the 17th Panzer Division had only one tank battalion (the II./Pz Rgt 39), with 67 tanks, 173 fewer than claimed destroyed by the VVS. The 17th Panzer Division was not even in the main attack sector, but further south with the 1st Panzer Army's 24th Panzer Corps. The 17th Panzer did not register any abnormal losses due to aircraft in the summer of 1943, and retreated westwards with Army Group South later in the year, still intact.

Towards the end of war, the Soviets were able to concentrate large numbers of Shturmoviks to support their main offensives. The frequent duels between dug-in 20 and 40 mm AA guns and Il-2 attackers never resulted in the complete destruction of the gun, while many Il-2s were brought down in these attacks.

The heavy armor of the Il-2 also meant that it would typically carry only comparatively light bomb-loads. The rocket projectiles especially were not effective, even the larger RS-132 (of which four were carried) having a warhead with only 0.9 kg (2.0 lb) of explosives, which compared poorly with the P-47's typical load of ten 5 in (13 cm) HVARs, each having 3.4 kg (7.5 lb) of explosives, or the eight to twelve RP-3 rockets on the Hawker Typhoon, each with 5.5 kg (12 lb) of explosives. Likewise, the Shturmovik's bombs were usually only 50 kg (110 lb), or rarely 100 kg (220 lb). To compensate for the poor accuracy of the Il-2's bombsight, in 1943, the Soviet Command decided to use shaped-charge armor-piercing projectiles against enemy armored vehicles, and the PTAB-2.5-1.5 SCAP aircraft bomb was put into production. These small-calibre bombs were loaded directly into the bomb bays and were dropped onto enemy vehicles from altitudes up to 100 metres (330 ft). As each Il-2 could carry up to 192 bombs, a fire carpet 70 metres (230 ft) long and 15 metres (49 ft) wide could cover enemy tanks, giving a high "kill" probability. Pilots of 291st ShAP were the first to use the PTAB-2.5-1.5 bombs. During one sortie on 5 June 1943, six attack aircraft led by Lt. Col. A. Vitrook destroyed 15 enemy tanks in one attack, and during five days of the enemy advance, the 291st Division claimed to have destroyed or damaged 422 enemy tanks.

=== The "flying tank" ===
Thanks to the heavy armor protection, the Il-2 could take a great deal of punishment and proved difficult for both ground and aircraft fire to shoot down.

A major threat to the Il-2 was German ground fire. In postwar interviews, Il-2 pilots reported 20 mm (0.79 in) and 37 mm (1.5 in) artillery as the primary threat. While the fabled 88 mm (3.5 in) calibre gun was formidable, low-flying Il-2s presented too fast-moving a target for the 88's relatively low rate of fire, only occasional hits were scored. Similarly, Finnish attempts to counter the Il-2 during the summer of 1944 proved ineffective as a result of the low numbers of 20 and 40 mm (0.79 and 1.57 in) AA in the field army. Heavier 76 mm (3.0 in) guns drawn from homeland defence proved also relatively ineffective and few Il-2s were downed despite attempting different tactics with time-fused fragmentation, contact-fused, and shrapnel ammunition: the heavy guns simply lacked the reaction times to take advantage of the brief firing opportunities presented by the low-altitude Il-2 attacks. Single-barrel 20 mm anti-aircraft guns were also found somewhat inadequate due to limited firepower: one or two shells were often not enough to destroy the Il-2, and unless the Il-2 was attacking the gun itself, thus presenting effectively a stationary target, scoring more hits during a firing opportunity was rare.

The armored tub, ranging from 5 to 12 mm (0.20 to 0.47 in) in thickness and enveloping the engine and the cockpit, could deflect all small arms fire and glancing blows from larger-caliber ammunition. Unfortunately the rear gunners did not have the benefit of all-around armor protection, especially from the rear and to the sides, and suffered about four times the casualties of pilots. Added casualties resulted from the Soviet policy of not returning home with unused ammunition, which typically resulted in repeated passes on the target. Soviet troops often requested additional passes even after the aircraft were out of ammunition to exploit the intimidating effect Il-2s had on German ground troops, who gave it the nickname the "flying tank". It was also called the "black death" by German troops. Luftwaffe pilots called it the Zementbomber (lit. 'concrete bomber'). The Finnish nickname maatalouskone (lit. 'agricultural machine' or 'tractor') derived from a word play with maataistelukone 'ground attack aircraft' (lit. 'ground combat aircraft'), where kone 'machine' in turn is shortened from lentokone 'aircraft' (lit. 'flying machine').

=== Rear gunner ===
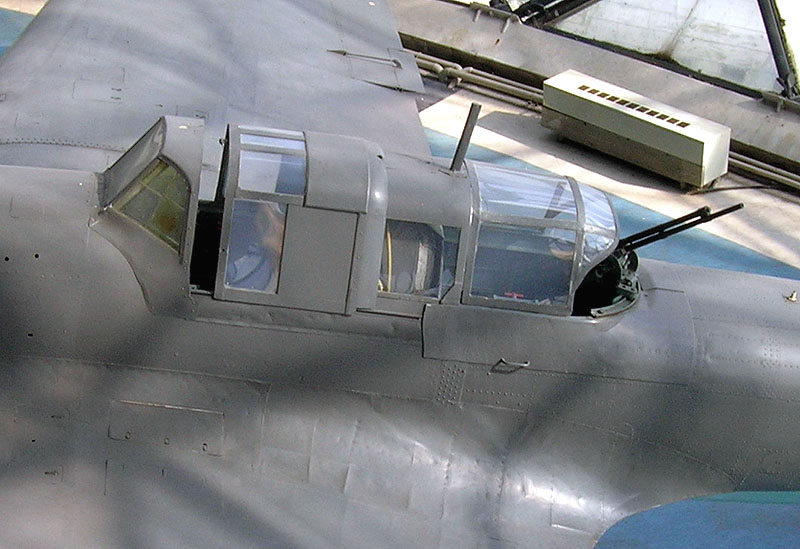
Il-2M cockpit. Museum of Aviation in Belgrade, Serbia

Heavy losses to enemy fighters forced the reintroduction of a rear gunner; early Il-2s were field modified by cutting a hole in the fuselage behind the cockpit for a gunner sitting on a canvas sling armed with a 12.7 mm (0.50 in) UBT machine gun in an improvised mounting. The semi-turret gun mount allowed the machine gun to be fired at angles of up to 35° upwards, 35° to starboard and 15° to port. Tests showed that maximum speed decreased by between 10 and 20 km/h (6 and 12 mph) and that the two-seater was more difficult to handle because the center of gravity was shifted backwards. At the beginning of March 1942, a production two-seat Il-2 with the new gunner's cockpit began manufacturer tests. The second cockpit and armament increased all-up weight by 170 kg (370 lb) so the flaps were allowed to be deployed at an angle of 17° to avoid an over-long takeoff run. The new variant had a lengthened fuselage compartment with an extended canopy offering some protection from the elements. Unlike the well-armoured cockpit of the pilot compartment with steel plating up to 12 mm (0.47 in) thick behind, beneath and on both sides as well as up to 65 mm (2.6 in) thick glass sections, the rear gunner was provided with 6 mm (0.24 in) thick armour, effective only against rifle-calibre rounds.

To improve performance, the Mikulin Design Bureau started work on an uprated AM-38 engine. The new engines produced 1,300 kW (1,700 hp) at takeoff and 1,100 kW (1,500 hp) at 750 metres (2,460 ft). They gave an improved takeoff and low-altitude performance. On 30 October 1942, production Il-2s powered by AM38s were used on the Central Front for the first time when they successfully attacked Smolensk airfield occupied by Germans. The Shturmovik rear guns proved to be effective against hostile fighters, and during the service trials alone, gunners shot down seven Bf 109s and repulsed many attacks. In January 1943, two-seat attack aircraft powered by uprated AM-38F engines (Forseerovannyy – uprated) began to arrive at front line units.

Nonetheless, the death rate among the air gunners remained exceptionally high and it was only for late models produced after 1944 that the 13 mm (0.51 in) rear plate of the armour shell was moved rearwards into the (wooden) rear fuselage to allow a gunner to sit behind the fuel tank. The armour did not extend to the rear or below although side armour panels were riveted to the rear armour plate to protect the ammunition tank for the UBT machine gun, providing some measure of protection. The modifications, including adding the rear gunner and gun, had added weight behind the center of gravity, resulting in "marginal" stability and handling characteristics that were "barely acceptable". The need to shift the aerodynamic center of the aircraft forwards due to the weight of the added rear gunner and lengthened cockpit was the reason for the swept back outer wings in later Il-2s.

In February 1945, the highest scoring German flying ace to be killed in action, Otto Kittel, was shot down by return fire from an Il-2.

=== Air-to-air combat ===
Owing to a shortage of fighters, in 1941–1942, Il-2s were occasionally used as fighters. While outclassed by dedicated fighters such as the Messerschmitt Bf 109 and Focke-Wulf Fw 190, in dogfights, the Il-2 could take on other Luftwaffe aircraft with some success. German front line units equipped with the Henschel Hs 126 suffered most of all from the ravages of Il-2s. Il-2 pilots also often attacked close formations of Junkers Ju 87s, as the 7.92 mm (0.312 in) machine guns of the Ju 87 Stukas were ineffective against the heavily armoured Shturmoviks. In the winter of 1941–1942, Il-2s were used against Luftwaffe transport aircraft, and became the most dangerous opponent of the Junkers Ju 52/3m. Pilots of 33rd GvShAP were the most successful in these operations. Other successful units were those in 1942–1943 operating near Stalingrad. Their targets were not only Ju 52s but also Heinkel He 111 and Focke-Wulf Fw 200 Condor bombers, delivering supplies to the besieged German troops.

While the Il-2 was a strong air-to-ground weapon, and even a fairly effective interceptor against slow bombers and transport aircraft, heavy losses resulted from its vulnerability to fighter attack. Losses were very high, the highest of all types of Soviet aircraft, though given the numbers in service this is only to be expected. Shturmovik losses (including the Il-10 type) in 1941–1945 were of 10,762 aircraft (533 in 1941, 1,676 in 1942, 3,515 in 1943, 3,347 in 1944 and 1,691 in 1945). The main defensive tactic was to fly low and reduce power as the enemy fighter closed in. This could make the fighter overshoot and fly into the Il-2's firing zone.

== Notable aircrew ==
Senior Lieutenant Anna Yegorova piloted 243 Il-2 missions and was decorated three times. One of these awards was the Gold Star of Hero of the Soviet Union that Yegorova had received "posthumously" in late 1944, since she was presumed dead after being shot down. She survived imprisonment in a German POW camp.

Guards Junior Lieutenant Ivan Drachenko, another Il-2 pilot, was one of only four men awarded the title Hero of the Soviet Union and also a Full Cavalier of the Order of Glory as a recipient of each of the Order of Glory's three classes. Despite having lost his right eye as a result of injuries sustained in a combat mission on 14 August 1943, he returned to flying status and continued to fly combat sorties until war's end.

Recipient of the Hero of the Soviet Union award, T. Kuznetsov survived the crash of his Il-2 in 1942 when shot down returning from a reconnaissance mission. Kuznetsov escaped from the wreck and hid nearby. To his surprise, a German Bf 109 fighter landed near the crash site and the pilot began to investigate the wrecked Il-2, possibly to look for souvenirs. Thinking quickly, Kuznetsov ran to the German fighter and used it to fly home, barely avoiding being shot down by Soviet fighters in the process.

Lieutenant Colonel Nelson Stepanyan flew an Il-2 and took part in a number of aerial battles and bombing sorties. He was shot down once but returned to Soviet lines. On his final sortie in Liepāja, Latvia on 14 December 1944, his plane was hit by anti-aircraft fire, and although wounded, he flew his airplane into a German warship. Soviet sources assert that Stepanyan flew no fewer than 239 combat sorties, sank 53 ships, thirteen of which he did alone, destroyed 80 tanks, 600 armored vehicles, and 27 aircraft.

Cosmonaut Georgy Beregovoy flew the Ilyushin in 185 sorties, and was awarded the Hero of the Soviet Union title in 1944. He was the earliest-born cosmonaut, and the only cosmonaut to be a Hero of the Soviet Union for an earlier achievement unrelated to space travel.

== Variants ==
The early two-seater prototype proved to be too heavy for the limited power of the early Mikulin AM-35 engine. A redesigned single-seat version was soon developed and saw combat, particularly in the early phase of the war in the Soviet Union. While the Il-2 proved to be a deadly air-to-ground weapon, heavy losses were caused by its vulnerability to fighter attack. Consequently, in February 1942, the two-seat design was revived. The Il-2M, with a rear gunner under the stretched canopy, entered service in September 1942 with the surviving single-seaters eventually modified to this standard. Later changes included an upgrade from 20 mm (0.79 in) to 23 or 37 mm (0.91 or 1.46 in) cannons, aerodynamic improvements, use of wooden outer wing panels instead of metal and increased fuel capacity. In 1943, the Il-2 Type 3 or Il-2m3 came out with redesigned "arrow-wings" that possessed leading edges that were swept back 15 degrees on the outer panels, and nearly straight trailing edges, resulting in a wing planform somewhat like the AT-6 trainer. Performance and handling were much improved from the resulting shift of the Il-2's aerodynamic center rearwards with the revised "arrow wing" planform to correct the earlier problem, and this became the most common version of the Il-2. A radial engine powered variant of the Il-2 with the Shvetsov ASh-82 engine was proposed in 1942 to remedy projected shortages in the Mikulin inline engines. However, the Shvetsov ASh-82 was also used in the new Lavochkin La-5 fighter which effectively secured all available engines to the Lavochkin bureau. The radial engine Sukhoi Su-2 ground attack aircraft was produced in small quantities, but was generally considered unsuitable due to inadequate performance and lack of defensive armament.

TsKB-55
Two-seat prototype, AM-35 engine, first flight on 2 October 1939.
BSh-2
VVS designation for TsKB-55 prototype.
TsKB-57
Single-seat prototype, AM-38 engine, first flight on 12 October 1940.
Il-2 (TsKB-57P)
Single-seat serial aircraft, AM-38 engine, first flight on 29 December 1940, some delivered to combat units in May–June 1941. Renamed the Il-2 in April 1941. Cannons 20 mm ShVAK or 23 mm VYa-23 (depending on which factory the Il-2 was manufactured in).
Il-2 two-seat
Two-seat version, AM-38 engine, first action on 30 October 1942 near Stalingrad. Maximum bomb load reduced from 600 to 400 kg (1,300 to 880 lb). Used on edges of flight formations for defense against German fighters. Quickly replaced by the "Il-2 production of 1943".
Il-2 production of 1943
Referred in the west as the "Il-2M". Powered by an upgraded AM-38F engine. Delivered to the front units from early 1943. In 1943, the 20 mm ShVAK armed Il-2s faded out, leaving only the 23 mm VYa variant.

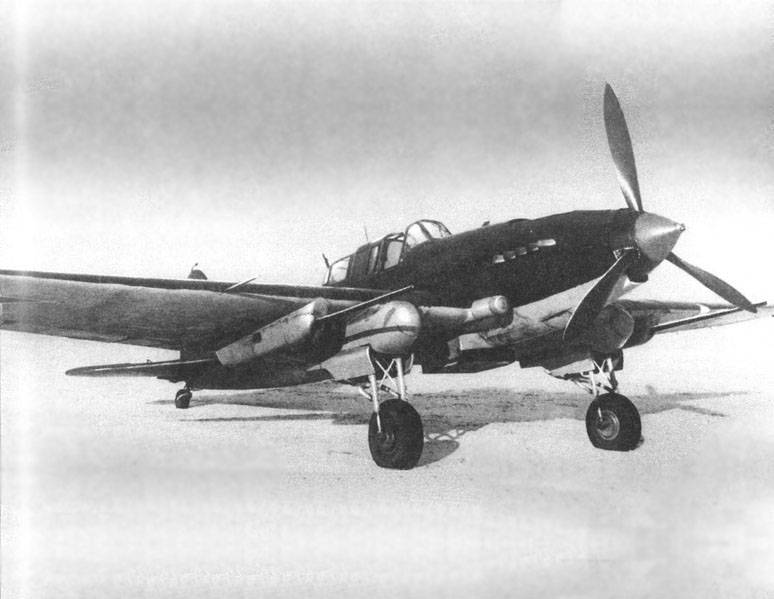
Il-2m with the NS-37 cannon in conformal gun pods beneath the wings

Il-2 with NS-37, or Il-2-37
Referred in the west as the "Il-2 Type 3M". Based on the two-seat Il-2, armed with Nudelman-Suranov NS-37 in conformal gun pods under the wings, instead of the 20/23 mm cannons, this version is an attempt to create an anti-tank aircraft, first used in combat during the Battle of Kursk. However, the combat effectiveness was quite low and production of the variant was limited to about 3,500. Moreover, bomb load was decreased from 600 to 200 kg (1,300 to 440 lb). This new payload consisted of either two 100 kilogram FAB-100 bombs, or four 50 kilogram FAB-50 bombs. It was replaced by the conventional Il-2 attackers armed with cassettes with cumulative bomblets.
Il-2 production 1944 "wing with arrow"
Referred in West as "Il-2M3" or "Il-2 Type 3". As more duralumin became available for the Soviet aviation industry, the Il-2 received a set of all-metal wing panels. At the same time, the outer wing planform was swept back, with a straight trailing edge, since the centre of gravity was shifted rearwards after the gunner was added. The wing planform change regained controllability of the two-seat Il-2 back to level of the single-seat Il-2.
Il-2U
Training version, also known as UIl-2.
Il-2T
Torpedo bomber version for the Soviet Navy with the VYa-23 cannons removed to save weight, it was able to carry a single 45 cm (18 in) torpedo. Evidently, it was only a design as the 23rd Attack Air Regiment of the Black Sea Fleet flew regular Il-2M-3s fitted with torpedo racks as a field modification, and that no such aircraft were ever noted in the battle sortie logs.
Il-2I
Armoured fighter, prototype only. Concept based on several dogfights between Il-2 and Luftwaffe bombers. Proved infeasible due to its low speed, which causes it to be able to intercept only older Luftwaffe bombers.
Il-2R
Il-2 fitted with a rocket motor in the rear, prototype only. The design was part of a concept to have units of Il-2R´s as part of a rapid response force, spread across the front to counter sudden counter-attacks. The rocket motor would aid in take-off and climbing, allowing the Il-2R´s to reach their target faster. The concept was abandoned before the go-ahead was given for production in 1945, as by then it was considered obsolete.
Il-2 with M-82/M-82IR engine
A backup project prepared while plants producing AM-35/AM-38 were evacuated. Compared to the original Il-2 it had additional armor, a rear gunner and Shvetsov ASh-82 or geared Ash-82IR engine. It had deteriorated rate of climb and field performance however it retained the same handling qualities. Recommended for production in Plant No.381 and Plant No.135, with 678 to be delivered by 1943. Cancelled because AM-38 production stabilized.

== Military operators ==
People's Republic of Bulgaria

- Bulgarian Air Force – received 120 Il-2 and 10 training Il-2U in 1945. The type was operated between 1945 and 1954.

Hungary

- Hungarian Air Force – received an unknown number of aircraft. The type was operated from 1945 to 1952.

(Mongolia) Mongolian People's Republic

- Mongolian People's Army Aviation – received 71 Il-2 in 1945. The type was operated between 1945 and 1954

Czechoslovakia

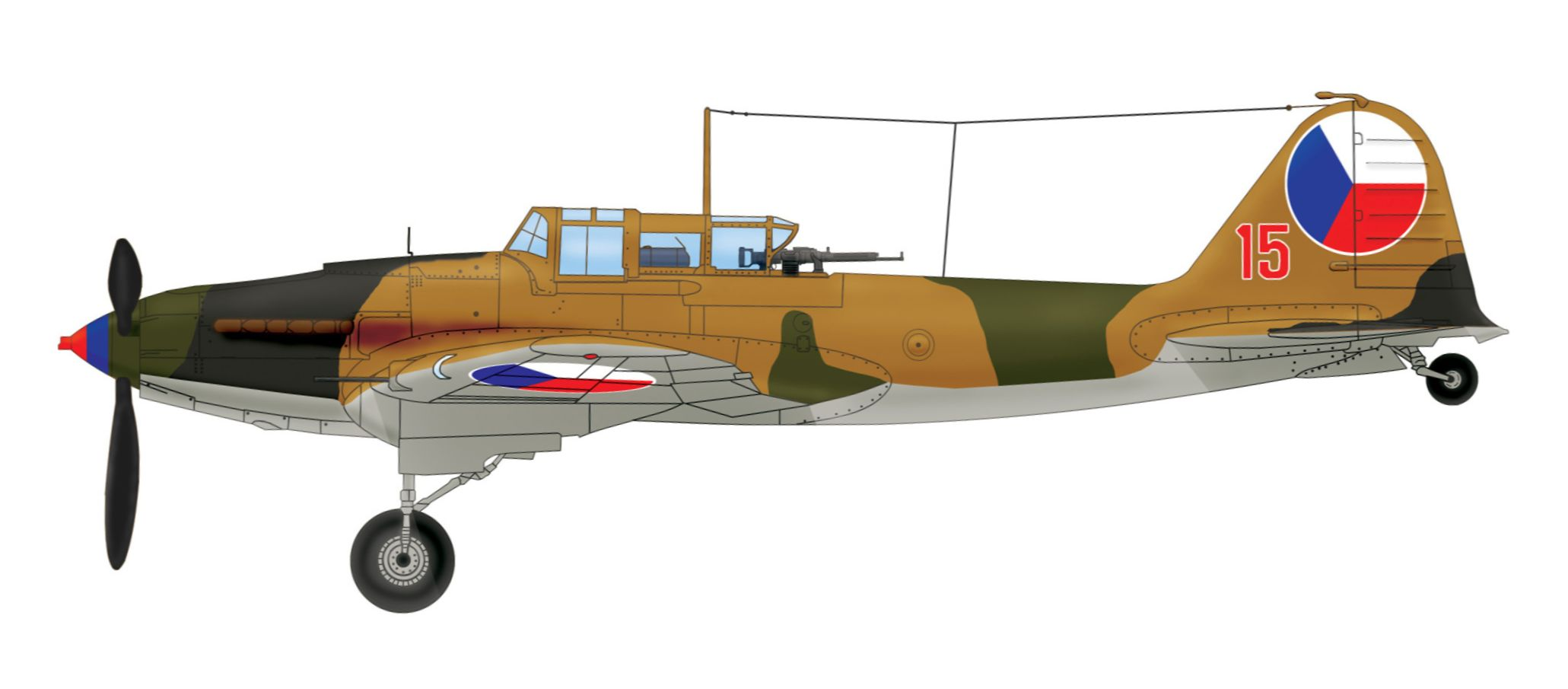
Ilyushin Il-2 of the 30th air regiment, 4. air division Czechoslovak Air Force, 1946

- Czechoslovak Air Force – received 33 Il-2 and 2 training Il-2U aircraft. This type was operated between 1944 and 1949.

Poland

- Air Force of the Polish Army – (after 1947 Polish Air Force) received about 230 Il-2 aircraft between 1944 and 1946. All were retired in 1949.

Soviet Union

- Soviet Air Force
- Soviet Naval Aviation

Yugoslavia

- SFR Yugoslav Air Force – received 213 aircraft in Il-2M3 and UIl-2 versions and used them until 1954. Used by:
  - 421st Assault Aviation Regiment (1944–1948)
  - 554th Assault Aviation Regiment (1945–1948)
  - 422nd Assault Aviation Regiment (1944–1948)
  - 423rd Assault Aviation Regiment (1944–1948)
  - 3rd Training Aviation Regiment (1945–1948)
  - 81st Assault Aviation Regiment (1948–1953)
  - 96th Assault Aviation Regiment (1948–1954)
  - 107th Assault Aviation Regiment (1948–1953)
  - 111th Assault Aviation Regiment (1948–1952)
  - 185th Mixed Aviation Regiment (1949–1952)

== Surviving aircraft ==
=== Bulgaria ===
On display

Il-2m3

- S/N unknown - at the National Aviation Museum in Krumovo, Plovdiv.

=== Czech Republic ===
On display

Il-2m3

- 12438 – at the Kbely Aviation Museum in Kbely, Prague.

=== Hungary ===
On display

Il-2

- S/N unknown - unrestored at the Airplane Museum of Szolnok in Szolnok, Jász-Nagykun-Szolnok. Recovered from a lake. Engine #259059.

=== Norway ===
On display

Il-2m3

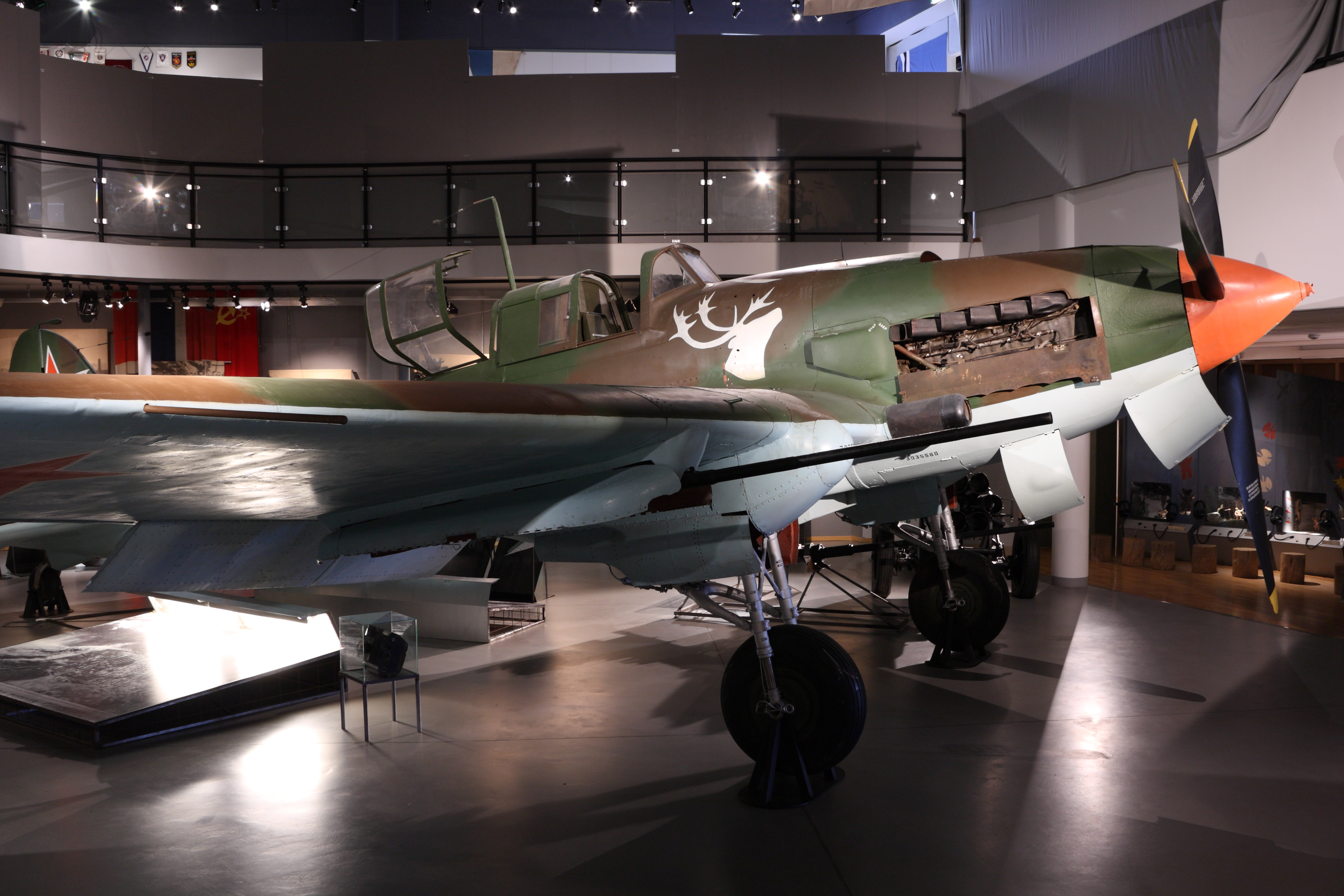
The restored Ilyushin IL-2m3 Shturmovik at Sør-Varanger museum in Kirkenes, Norway

- 3035560 – at the Grenselandsmuseet in Kirkenes, Finnmark. It was recovered from a lake on the Norwegian side of the border in 1985 and restored in Russia.

=== Poland ===
On display

Il-2m3

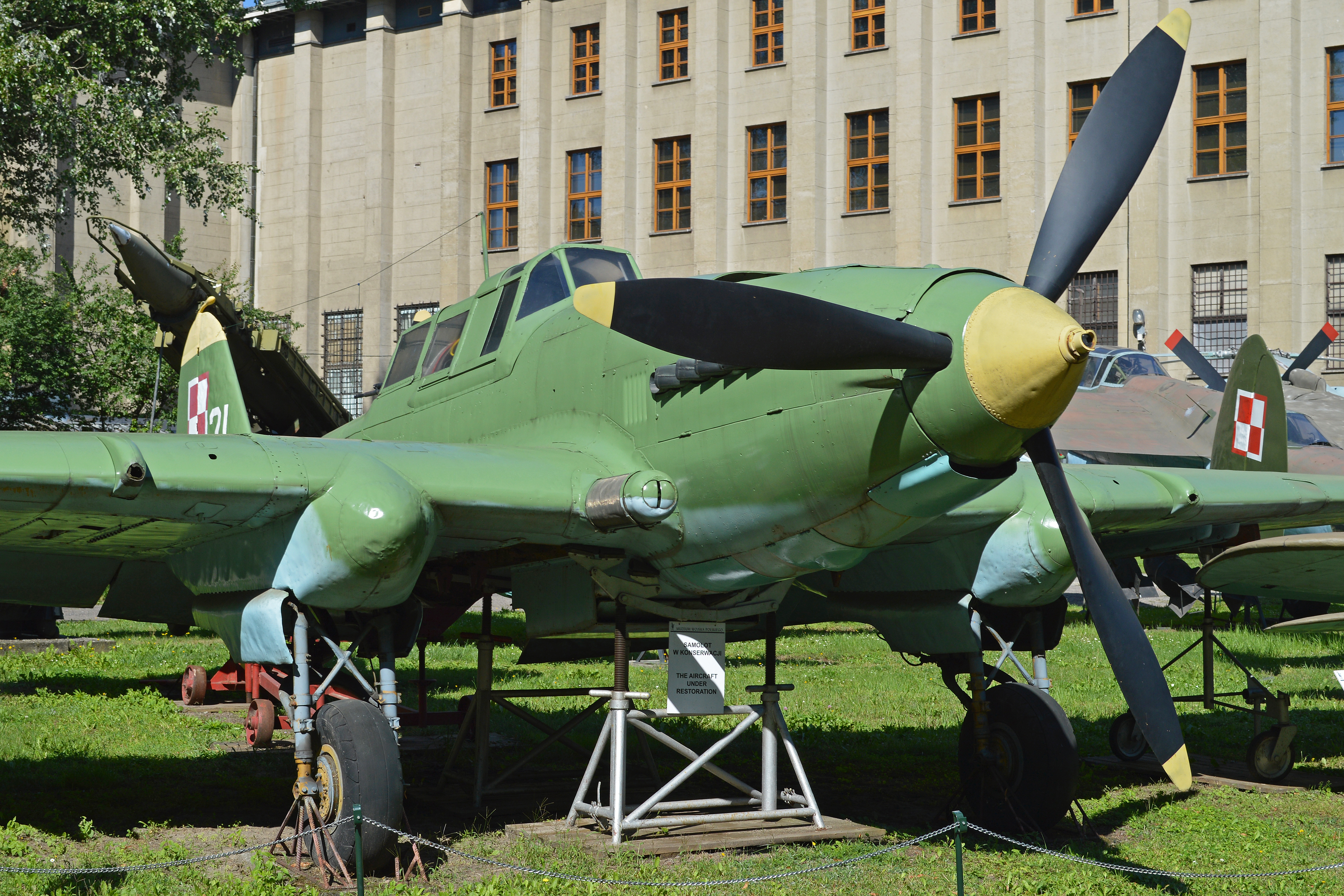
Ilyushin Il-2 S/N 21 in Warsaw

- 21 - at the Museum of the Polish Army in Warsaw, Mazovia. It was used by the 3rd Assault Aviation Regiment (3 Pułk Lotnictwa Szturmowego).

=== Russia ===
Airworthy

Il-2

- 1872452 – Airworthy with the Wings of Victory Foundation in Moscow. It was recovered in 2015 from the bottom of a lake near Murmansk and restored by Aviarestoration on a commission from UAC.

On display

Il-2

- 2440 – displayed in Novorossiysk, Krasnodar Krai.

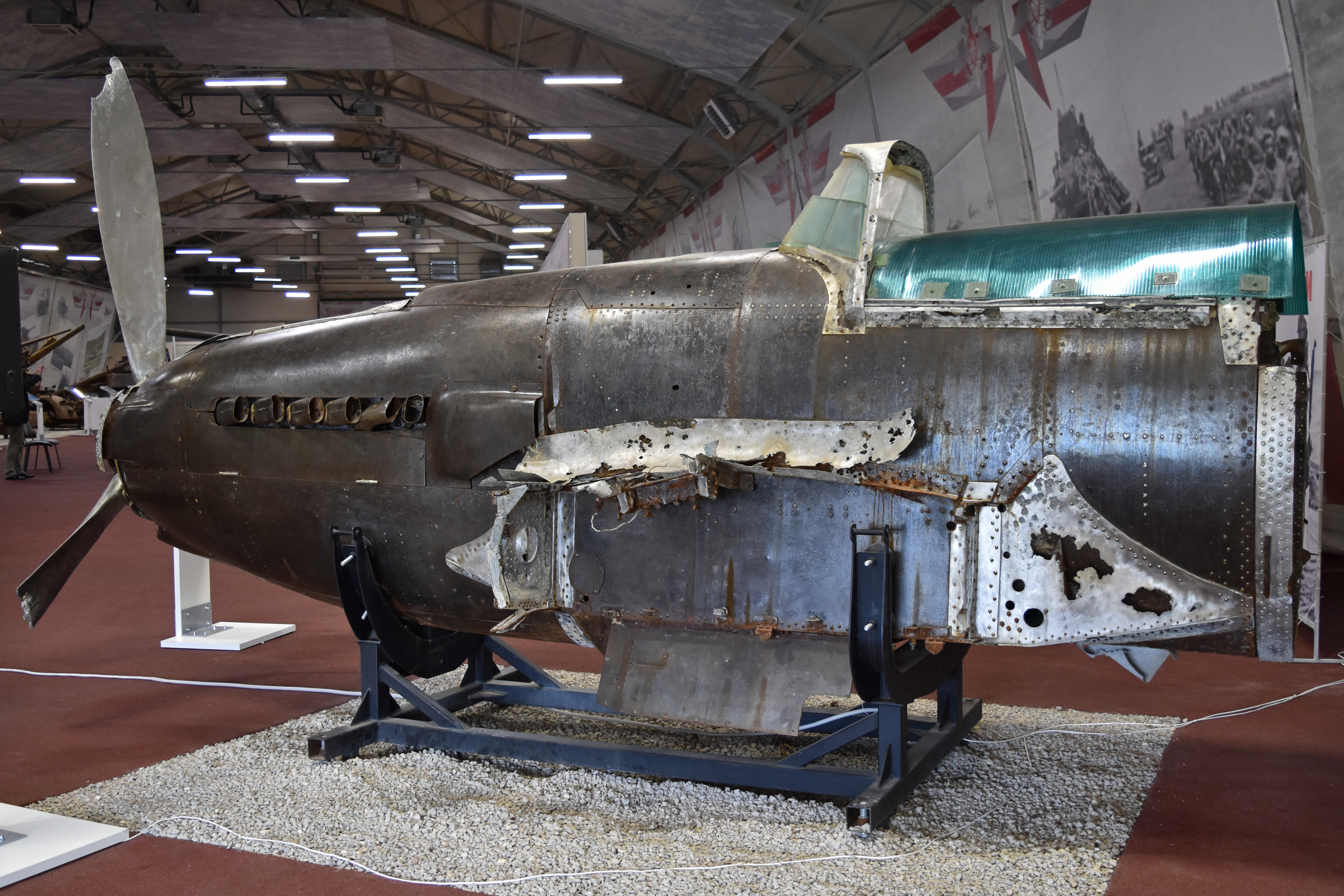
Forward fuselage of Ilyushin Il-2 c/n 7826 at Patriot Park

- 7826 - (forward fuselage only) displayed unrestored at Patriot Park in Kubinka, Moscow Oblast. The aircraft was reportedly shot down in the Kerch Strait on 1 November 1943, and was recovered in 2015.
- S/N unknown - displayed in Dubna, Moscow. It was recovered locally.
- S/N unknown - displayed in Lebyazhye, Leningrad.
- S/N unknown - displayed in a traffic circle in Samara. This particular plane was shot down in 1943 over Karelia, but the heavily wounded pilot, K. Kotlyarovsky, managed to crash-land the plane near Lake Oriyarvi. The aircraft was returned to Kuybyshev in 1975.
- S/N unknown - displayed at the UMMC Museum Complex in Verkhnyaya Pyshma, Sverdlovsk.

Il-2m3

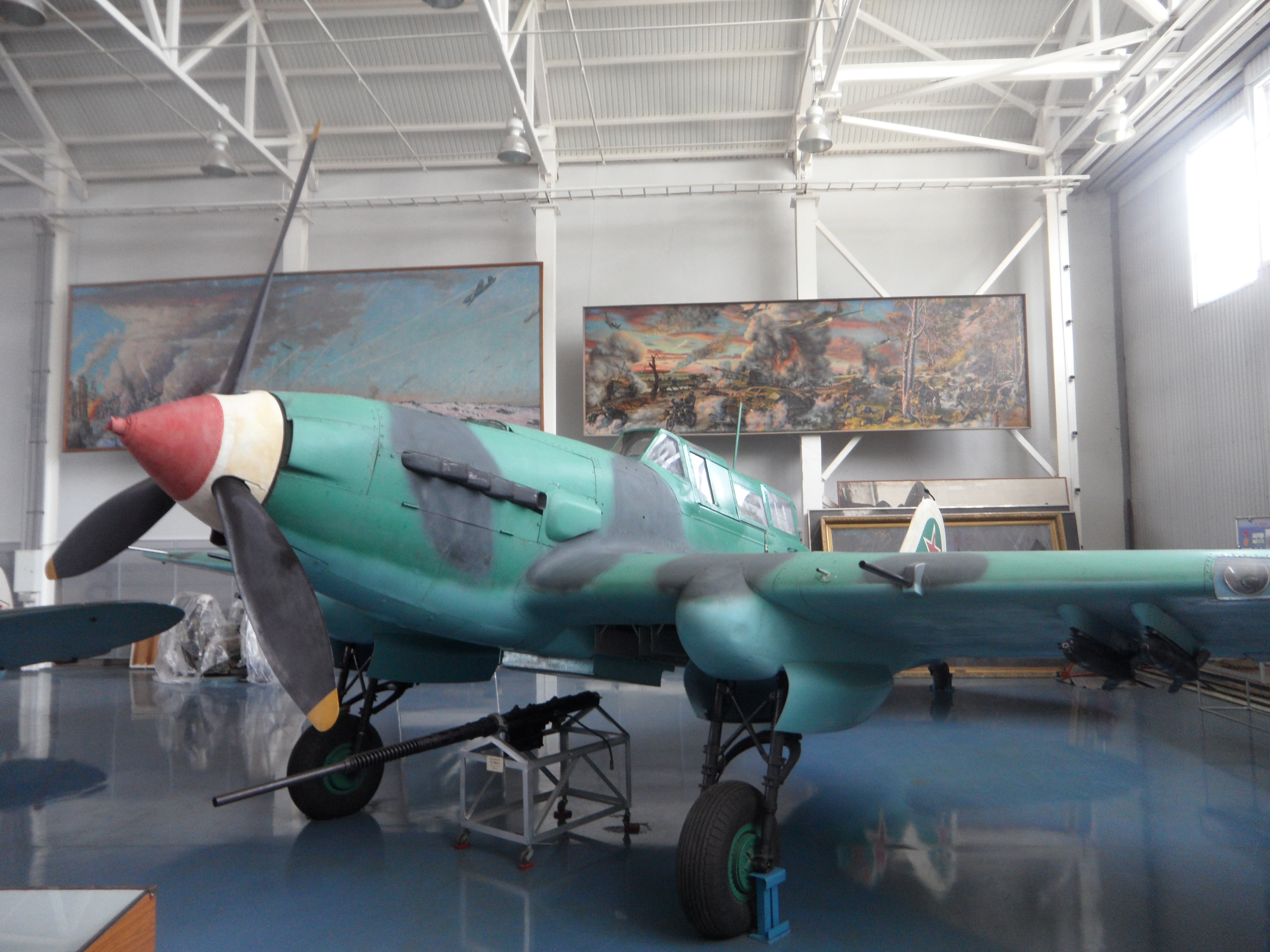
The restored Ilyushin IL-2 Shturmovik at the Central Air Force Museum, Monino

- 301060 – Il-2m3 on static display at the Central Air Force Museum in Monino, Moscow.

Under restoration or in storage

Il-2

- 1870930 - Under restoration to airworthy condition by the Wings of Victory Foundation in Moscow. It is the only surviving single-seat Il-2 built before 1942.

=== Serbia ===
On display

Il-2m3

- 308831 – at the Aeronautical Museum Belgrade in Surčin, Belgrade.

=== United Kingdom ===
Under restoration or in storage

Il-2

- 1878576 - in storage at Wickenby, Lincolnshire, England.

Il-2m3

- 1870710 - under restoration for display at Wickenby, Lincolnshire, England for Royal Air Force Museum London.

=== United States ===
Airworthy

Il-2m3

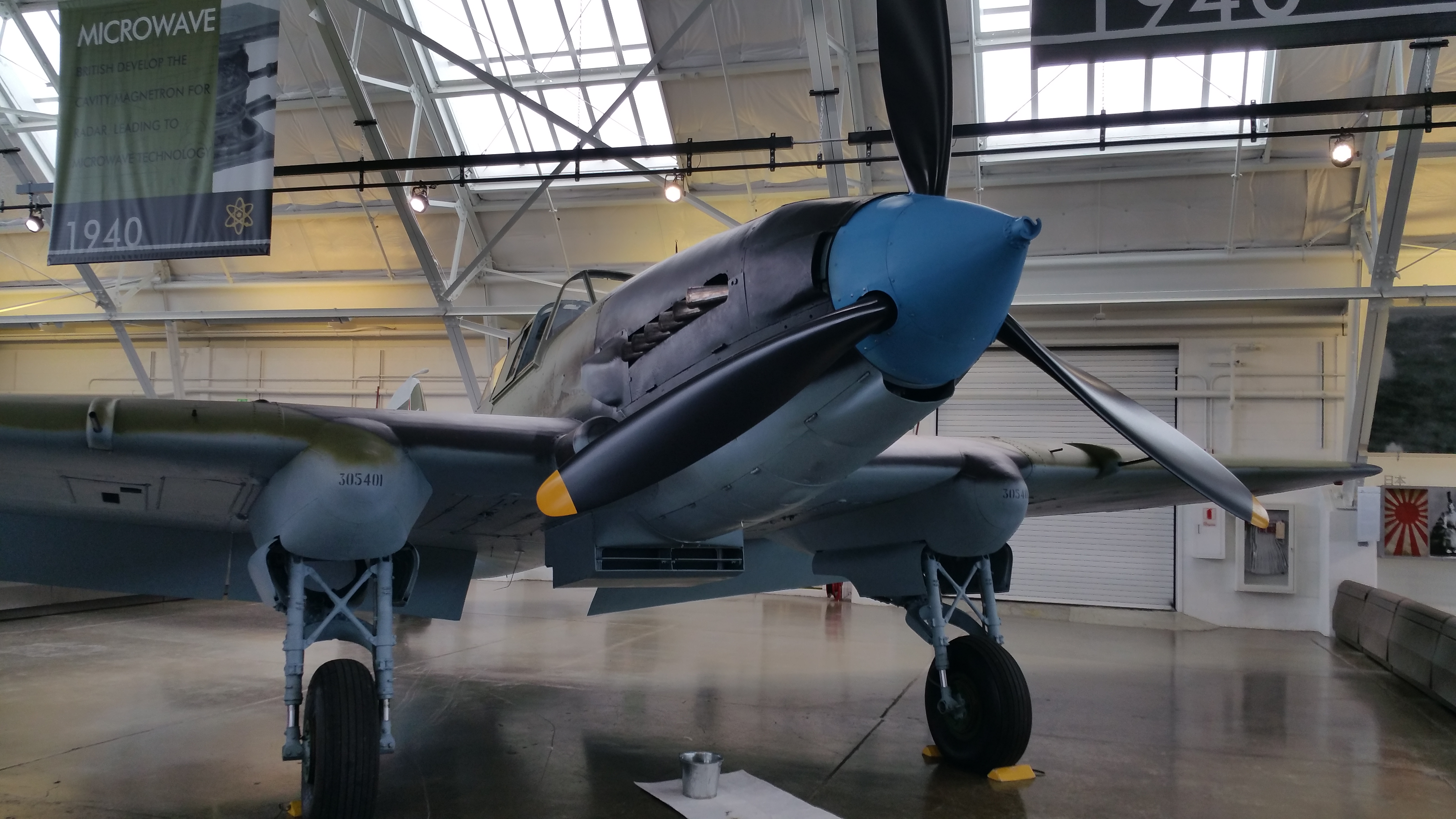
The airworthy Ilyushin Il-2M3 of the Flying Heritage Collection, flown with an Allison V-1710 powerplant

- 305401 – at the Flying Heritage & Combat Armor Museum in Everett, Washington. It incorporates parts of four different wrecked aircraft recovered from Russia and was restored by Retro Avia Tech with a reversed Allison V-1710-113.

On display

Il-2

- 5612 – Il-2 on static display at the Pima Air & Space Museum in Tucson, Arizona.

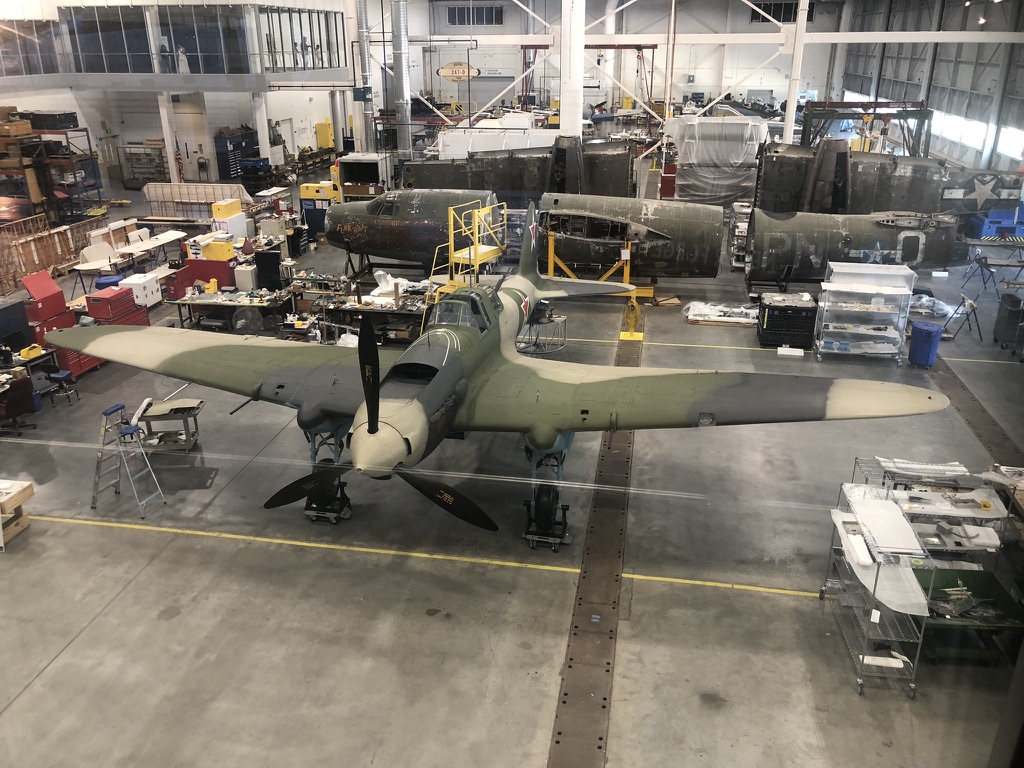
Ilyushin Il-2 undergoing restoration at the Steven F. Udvar-Hazy Center in Chantilly, Virginia.

- Composite – On display at the National Air and Space Museum. Previously under restoration at the Steven F. Udvar-Hazy Center in Chantilly, Virginia. Formerly held in storage at the Paul E. Garber Preservation, Restoration, and Storage Facility of the National Air and Space Museum in Suitland, Maryland.

== Specifications (Il-2M3) ==
Ilyushin Il-2M3

Data from The Annals of Ilyusha…

General characteristics

- Crew: 2
- Length: 11.65 m (38 ft 3 in)
- Wingspan: 14.60 m (47 ft 11 in)
- Height: 4.17 m (13 ft 8 in) (tail up)
- Wing area: 38.50 m^{2} (414.4 sq ft)
- Empty weight: 4,425 kg (9,755 lb)
- Max takeoff weight: 6,360 kg (14,021 lb)
- Fuel capacity: 730 L (190 US gal; 160 imp gal)
- Powerplant: 1 × Mikulin AM-38F liquid-cooled V12 engine, 1,280 kW (1,720 hp) (takeoff power),1,100 kW (1,500 hp) at 750 m (2,460 ft)
- Propellers: 3-bladed AV-57-158 variable-pitch propeller, 3.60 m (11 ft 10 in) diameter

Performance

- Maximum speed: 410 km/h (250 mph, 220 kn) at 1,500 m (4,900 ft)
- Range: 765 km (475 mi, 413 nmi) at 275 km/h (171 mph; 148 kn) and 1,000 m (3,300 ft)
- Endurance: 2.75 hr
- Service ceiling: 4,525 m (14,846 ft) (service ceiling), 6,360 m (20,870 ft) (absolute ceiling)
- Time to altitude: 15 min to 5,000 m (16,000 ft)

Armament

- Guns:
  - 2 × fixed forward-firing 23×152mm VYa-23 cannons, 150 rounds per gun
  - 2 × fixed forward-firing 7.62×54mmR ShKAS machine guns, 750 rounds per gun
  - 1 × manually aimed 12.7×108mm Berezin UBT machine gun in rear cockpit, 300 rounds
- Rockets:
  - 8× RS-82 rockets or
  - 4× RS-132 rockets
- Bombs:
  - 6× 100 kg (220 lb) bombs in wing bomb-bays and underwing or
  - 4× dispensers for 48 2.5 kg (5.5 lb) PTAB anti-armour bombs (192 total) in wing bays

== See also ==
Related development

- Ilyushin Il-1 – 1944 fighter aircraft prototype by Ilyushin
- Ilyushin Il-8 – Soviet ground-attack aircraft prototype
- Ilyushin Il-10 – Soviet ground attack aircraft
- Ilyushin Il-16 – Soviet ground-attack aircraft prototype

Aircraft of comparable role, configuration, and era

- Fairey Battle – Light bomber family by Fairey
- Henschel Hs 129 – German twin engine WWII ground attack aircraft
- Junkers Ju 87 – 1935 dive bomber aircraft family by Junkers
- Junkers Ju 187 – Proposed WWII dive bomber aircraft
- Mitsubishi Ki-51 – Japanese light bomber/dive bomber

Related lists

- List of aircraft of World War II
- List of most-produced aircraft
