= List of NATO reporting names for bomber aircraft =

This is a list of NATO reporting name/ASCC names for bombers, with Soviet Union and Chinese designations. Bombers had names starting with the letter "B"; single-syllable words denoted propeller driven aircraft (piston and turboprop engines), while two syllable words were used for jets. Three syllable words are for propfans.

| Aircraft | NATO reporting name | Ref |
|---|---|---|
| Douglas A-20 Havoc | Box | |
| Ilyushin Il-2 | Bark | |
| Ilyushin Il-4 | Bob | |
| Ilyushin Il-10 | Beast | |
| Ilyushin Il-28 | Beagle | |
| Ilyushin Il-40 | Brawny | |
| Ilyushin Il-54 | Blowlamp | |
| Myasishchev M-4 | Bison | |
| Myasishchev M-50 | Bounder | |
| North American B-25 Mitchell | Bank | |
| Petlyakov Pe-2 | Buck | |
| Tupolev Tu-2 | Bat | |
| Tupolev Tu-4 | Bull | |
| Tupolev Tu-14 | Bosun | |
| Tupolev Tu-16, Xian H-6 | Badger | |
| Tupolev Tu-22 | Blinder | |
| Tupolev Tu-22M | Backfire | |
| Tupolev Tu-82 | Butcher | |
| Tupolev Tu-85 | Barge | |
| Tupolev Tu-91 | Boot | |
| Tupolev Tu-95 | Bear A/B/C/D | |
| Tupolev Tu-98 | Backfin | |
| Tupolev Tu-160 | Blackjack | |
| Yakovlev Yak-28 | Brassard | |
| Yakovlev Yak-28B | Brewer | |

== See also ==
- NATO reporting name
