= Dilyalevo =

Dilyalevo Дилялево
- Village
- Location within Vologda Oblast Location within Russia
- Coordinates: 59°42′N 39°10′E
- Country: Russia
- Region: Vologda Oblast
- District: Vologodsky District
- Time zone: UTC+3:00

Dilyalevo (Russian: Дилялево) is a rural locality (a village) in Novlenskoye Rural Settlement, Vologodsky District, Vologda Oblast, Russia. The population was 1 as of 2002.

== Geography ==
Dilyalevo is located 73 km northwest of Vologda (the district's administrative centre) by road. Mitenskoye is the nearest rural locality.

== Notable people ==
- Sergey Ilyushin (1894–1977), aircraft designer
