= Kashara =

Rural locality name

Distribution of the inhabited localities called "Kashara" in Kursk Oblast

Kashara (Russian: Кашара) is the name of two rural localities in Kursk Oblast, Russia:

- Kashara, Konyshyovsky District, Kursk Oblast, a village in Platavsky Selsoviet of Konyshyovsky District, 51°50′21″N 35°05′06″E
- Kashara, Ponyrovsky District, Kursk Oblast, a village in Olkhovatsky Selsoviet of Ponyrovsky District, 52°17′04″N 36°06′22″E
