= Bereznik, Bereznitsky Selsoviet, Ustyansky District, Arkhangelsk Oblast =

Bereznik Березник
- Selo
- Location within Arkhangelsk Oblast Location within Russia
- Coordinates: 61°14′N 43°37′E
- Country: Russia
- Region: Arkhangelsk Oblast
- District: Ustyansky District
- Time zone: UTC+3:00

Bereznik (Russian: Березник) is a rural locality (a selo) and the administrative center of Bereznitskoye Rural Settlement of Ustyansky District, Arkhangelsk Oblast, Russia. The population was 609 as of 2010. There are 20 streets.

== Geography ==
It is located on the Ustya River.
