= Bereznik, Tarnogsky District, Vologda Oblast =

Bereznik Березник
- Village
- Location within Vologda Oblast Location within Russia
- Coordinates: 60°24′N 43°35′E
- Country: Russia
- Region: Vologda Oblast
- District: Tarnogsky District
- Time zone: UTC+3:00

Bereznik (Russian: Березник) is a rural locality (a village) in Tarnogskoye Rural Settlement, Tarnogsky District, Vologda Oblast, Russia. The population was 13 as of 2002.

== Geography ==
Bereznik is located 12 km south of Tarnogsky Gorodok (the district's administrative centre) by road. Lychnaya is the nearest rural locality.
