= Bereznik, Sheksninsky District, Vologda Oblast =

Bereznik Березник
- Village
- Location within Vologda Oblast Location within Russia
- Coordinates: 59°33′N 38°21′E
- Country: Russia
- Region: Vologda Oblast
- District: Sheksninsky District
- Time zone: UTC+3:00

Bereznik (Russian: Березник) is a rural locality (a village) in Kameshnikovskoye Rural Settlement, Sheksninsky District, Vologda Oblast, Russia. The population was 58 as of 2002.

== Geography ==
Bereznik is located 58 km north of Sheksna (the district's administrative centre) by road. Deryagino is the nearest rural locality.
