= Bereznik, Pinezhsky Selsoviet, Pinezhsky District, Arkhangelsk Oblast =

Bereznik Березник
- Village
- Location within Arkhangelsk Oblast Location within Russia
- Coordinates: 64°24′N 43°10′E
- Country: Russia
- Region: Arkhangelsk Oblast
- District: Pinezhsky District
- Time zone: UTC+3:00

Bereznik (Russian: Березник) is a rural locality (a village) in Pinezhsky District, Arkhangelsk Oblast, Russia. The population was 1 as of 2012.

== Geography ==
It is located on the Pinega River.
