= Bereznik, Permsky District, Perm Krai =

Bereznik Березник
- Village
- Location within Perm Krai Location within Russia
- Coordinates: 57°50′N 56°08′E
- Country: Russia
- Region: Perm Krai
- District: Permsky District
- Time zone: UTC+5:00

Bereznik (Russian: Березник) is a rural locality (a village) in Gamovskoye Rural Settlement, Permsky District, Perm Krai, Russia. The population was 9 as of 2010.

== Geography ==
Bereznik is located 25 km southwest of Perm (the district's administrative centre) by road. Shulgino is the nearest rural locality.
