= Bereznik, Beryozovsky District, Perm Krai =

Bereznik Березник
- Village
- Location within Perm Krai Location within Russia
- Coordinates: 57°43′N 57°19′E
- Country: Russia
- Region: Perm Krai
- District: Beryozovsky District
- Time zone: UTC+5:00

Bereznik (Russian: Березник) is a rural locality (a village) in Pereborskoye Rural Settlement, Beryozovsky District, Perm Krai, Russia. The population was 6 as of 2010.

== Geography ==
It is located 1.5 km north from Perebor.
