= List of aircraft (Ts) =

This is a list of aircraft in alphabetical order beginning with 'Ts'.

== Ts ==
=== TsAGI ===
(Tsentrahl'nyy Aerodinamicheskiy i Ghidrodinamicheskiy Institoot- central aerodynamics and hydrodynamics institute) - Also written as CAHI or ZAGI.

- TsAGI 1-EA
- TsAGI 2-EA
- TsAGI 3-EA
- TsAGI 5-EA
- TsAGI 11-EA
- TsAGI 11-EA PV
- TsAGI A-4
- TsAGI A-6
- TsAGI A-8
- TsAGI A-7
- TsAGI A-7bis
- TsAGI A-7-Za
- TsAGI A-12
- TsAGI A-13
- TsAGI A-14
- TsAGI A-15
- TsAGI LS

=== TsKB ===
(Tsentrahl'noye konstrooktorskoye byuro - central construction bureau)

- TsKB-1
- TsKB-3
- TsKB-4
- TsKB-5
- TsKB-6
- TsKB-7
- TsKB-8
- TsKB-10
- TsKB-11
- TsKB-12
- TsKB-15
- TsKB-18
- TsKB-19
- TsKB-21
- TsKB-23
- TsKB-24
- TsKB-25
- TsKB-26
- TsKB-26P
- TsKB-27
- TsKB-29
- TsKB-30
- TsKB-32
- TsKB-33
- TsKB-38
- TsKB-43
- TsKB-44
- TsKB-48
- TsKB-54
- TsKB-55
- TsKB-56
- TsKB-57
- TsKB-60

=== Tsuzuku ===
(Tetsusaburo Tsuzuku)

- Tsuzuku No.1
- Tsuzuku No.2
- Tsuzuku No.3

=== Tsybin ===
(Designer. P. V. Tsybin)

- Kolesnikov-Tsibin KC-20
- Tsybin Ts-25
- Tsybin NM-1
- Tsybin RSR
- Tsybin-Shavrov-Bartini RGSR
