= Yakovlev Yak-14 =

Assault glider in the Soviet Air Force

Yak-14
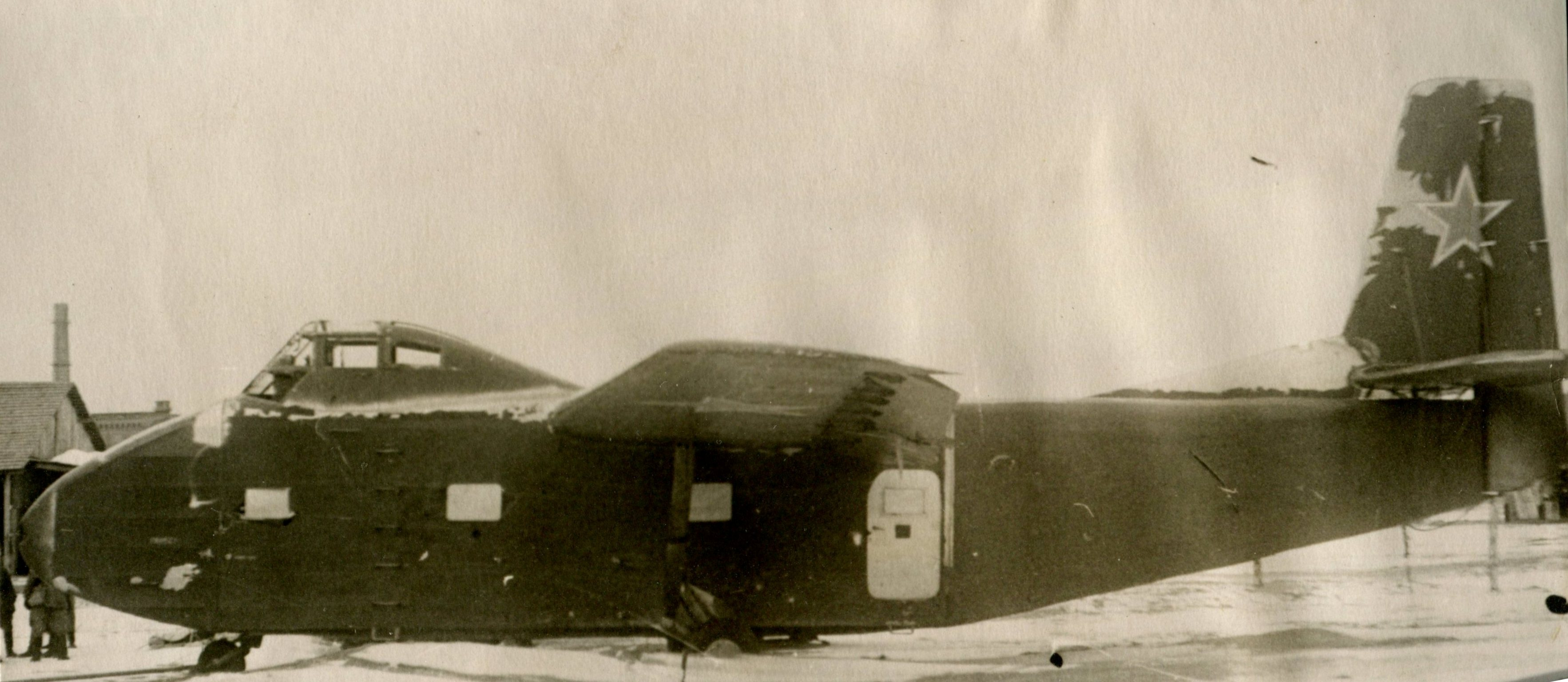

General information
- Type: Military transport glider
- Manufacturer: Yakovlev
- Status: Retired
- Primary users: Soviet Union Czechoslovakia
- Number built: 413

History
- Introduction date: 1950
- First flight: 1948

The Yakovlev Yak-14 (Russian: Яковлев Як-14; NATO reporting name: Crow or Mare) was the largest assault glider ever to enter service with the Soviet Air Force. It was introduced in 1949, at a time when other air forces were abandoning the glider concept. In 1950 a Yak-14 became the first glider to fly over the North Pole.

== Design and development ==
During World War II, the Soviet Union operated only light gliders like the Gribovsky G-11, Antonov A-7 and Kolesnikov-Tsybin KC-20 which were unable to transport vehicles, light tanks or artillery. Only after the war were Soviet designers ordered to develop medium gliders capable of carrying heavy or bulky loads. In 1948 the Soviet Air Forces issued a specification for a large assault glider needed by the VDV (Vozdushnodesantnyye Voyska – airborne troops) which was to be capable of carrying a payload of 3,500 kilograms (7,700 lb), including loads like an anti-tank or field gun with its crew and associated tow vehicle, or up to 35 troops. The Yakovlev design bureau was instructed to design an aircraft to meet this requirement, despite its relative inexperience in the design of such large aircraft.

Yakovlev's design, the Yak-14 was a high-wing monoplane. It had a rectangular section fuselage with a steel-tube and dural structure with a fabric covering. To aid loading and unloading of cargo, the aircraft's nose swung to the right with the tail section pivoting to the left. The two pilots sat side by side in an enclosed cockpit above the left side of the fuselage. They were provided with a display that used a transmitter in the towing aircraft to show the relative positions of the two aircraft when flying in cloud. The wings were made of dural and fabric and were braced to the fuselage by a single strut on each side. Large slotted trailing-edge flaps were fitted to the wings, while the aircraft was fitted with a fixed nosewheel undercarriage which could be made to "kneel" by releasing air from the pneumatic shock struts of the undercarriage, lowering the fuselage for ease of unloading or to make short landings on belly-mounted skids.

=== Testing ===
The first prototype made its maiden flight in June 1948 from Medvyezhe Ozero, near Omsk. Official testing resulted in a number of changes to the design, with a large dorsal fin being fitted, and spoilers being added to reduce landing runs, while the payload of the glider was increased to allow an ASU-57 assault gun to be carried. As such the Yak-14 passed its acceptance trials from August to September 1949, with the glider entering mass production later that year.

While some Yak-14s were constructed at Chkalovsk, the majority were produced at Rostov-on-Don. Total production was 413 series gliders.

== Operational history ==
The Yak-14 filled an important role in Soviet service in the 1950s, being the only way of carrying large loads by air to remote parts of the Soviet Union without having to disassemble the loads. The usual tug was the Ilyushin Il-12.

One Yak-14 was flown to the North Pole in 1950, while another example of the glider's versatility took place in March 1954, when four Yak-14s made a long-distance flight to an ice station on an ice floe drifting on the Arctic Ocean, with the supplies delivered including a large bulldozer. The gliders flew from Tula on March 10, with several stops at Omsk, Krasnoyarsk and the Schmidt Cape, on Sakhalin island in the Far East, before reaching SP-4 in early April during a heavy freeze.

A few were delivered to Czechoslovakia in the early 1950s which used them under the designation NK-14.

Soviet Air Force transport gliders were gradually withdrawn from service with the arrival of turboprop transports like the Antonov An-24 and Antonov An-12, which entered service in the late 1950s.

== Variants ==
Yak-14
Basic production variant.
Yak-14M
Increased payload version built from 1951.
NK-14 (Nákladní kluzák – cargo glider)
Yak-14s delivered to Czechoslovakia

== Operators ==
Czechoslovakia

- Czechoslovak Air Force

Soviet Union

- Soviet Air Force

== Specifications (Yak-14) ==

Data from Yakovlev Aircraft since 1924

General characteristics

- Crew: two
- Length: 18.44 m (60 ft 6 in)
- Wingspan: 26.17 m (85 ft 10 in)
- Wing area: 83.35 m^{2} (897.2 sq ft)
- Empty weight: 3,082 kg (6,795 lb)
- Gross weight: 6,750 kg (14,881 lb)

Performance

- Maximum speed: 300 km/h (190 mph, 160 kn) (maximum towing speed)
- Cruise speed: 145 km/h (90 mph, 78 kn) (optimum gliding speed)

== See also ==
Aircraft of comparable role, configuration, and era

- Airspeed Horsa
- Chase XCG-20
- General Aircraft Hamilcar
- Gotha Go 242
- Messerschmitt Me 321
- Tsybin Ts-25
- Waco CG-4

Related lists

- List of military aircraft of the Soviet Union and the CIS
