= Special number 3 light tank Ku-Ro =

Japanese prototype winged light tank of World War II

Special number 3 Ku-Ro (So-Ra)
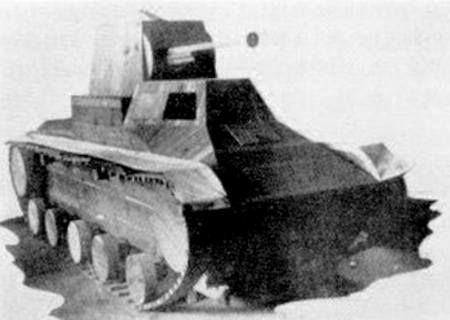
- Special Number 3 light tank prototype mockup
- Place of origin: Empire of Japan

Production history
- Designed: 1943/1944
- Produced: 1944
- No. built: 1 (prototype mockup only)

Specifications
- Mass: 2.9 t (2.9 long tons; 3.2 short tons) for the tank, with wings added 4.2 t (4.1 long tons; 4.6 short tons)
- Length: 4.07 m (13 ft 4 in)
- Width: 1.44 m (4 ft 9 in)
- Height: 1.89 m (6 ft 2 in)
- Crew: 2
- Main armament: One Type 100 37 mm tank gun or one 7.7 mm Type 97 machine gun or one flamethrower
- Secondary armament: None
- Engine: Mitsubishi Franklin air-cooled inline 4-cylinder gasoline 50 hp (37.28 kW) at 2400 rpm
- Suspension: bellcrank
- Maximum speed: 43 km/h (27 mph) on road

The Special number 3 light tank Ku-Ro (特三号戦車 クロ) (also known as the "So-Ra") was an experimental Japanese winged light tank project, developed during World War II. It is one of the notable aircraft concepts developed during that war.

== Context ==
The main problem that the army faced was the difficulty of moving armored fighting vehicles long distances over the main islands of Japan to resist seaborne invasion. They came up with the idea that it could be done by equipping the vehicle with wings, empennage, and take-off carriages. Once landed, all the items that needed to make the vehicle airborne would be quickly detached to allow it to go into action as a ground vehicle.

In 1939, the Japanese Army Air Force Examination Department began the concept development of what became the Special tank No. 3 Ku-Ro. The glider for this project was given the army designation Ku-6 (Japanese: ク六 (Ku roku)), which can also be read or abbreviated as "Ku-Ro", and thus that also became the code name for the tank the glider was intended to carry.

== Development ==
In the fall of 1943, the Imperial Japanese Army's Teishin Shudan formed the 1st Glider Tank Troop. Before the 1st Glider Troop was established, the only heavy support available to Japan's airborne infantry was provided by the Kokusai Ku-8. This military glider was able to transport the Type 94 and Type 94 75 mm mountain guns, but these infantry support guns lacked the mobility and anti-tank capabilities required by Japan's paratroopers. The solution to this problem was to develop a glider-portable light tank, but the existing Ku-8 glider was not capable of supporting the weight of a vehicle as large as a tank. So in 1943 and into 1944 the Armoured Army Headquarters (army aviation headquarters) and the Fourth Army Institute of Technology collaborated on a new concept to fill this role, a flying tank. A small tank that could be towed on a glider by a powered aircraft and then released and glide down to the battlefield along with paratroopers. The tank would detach its wings after landing and then be able to provide armour support to the infantry. Rather than using an existing tank or glider design, it was decided that a new tank and new glider should be developed. Work on developing the glider (wing and empennage) was given to Maeda Iron Works Company (Maeda Kōken Kōgyō), while designing and building of the prototype tank was given to Mitsubishi.

== Design ==
Mitsubishi based the tank on their Type 98 Ke-Ni light tank. The weight was reduced to 2.9 tons from 7.2 tons and the crew was brought down from 3 to 2. A single mockup of a prototype tank was built and named the "Special number 3 light tank Ku-Ro". The commander sat in the turret and acted as both gunner and loader. The driver's position was located in the chassis. The turret was rear-mounted and housed the tank's only weapon, a Type 100 37 mm tank gun, the same used by the Ke-Ni. There was no coaxial or hull mounted machine gun. There were plans to mount either a flamethrower or 7.7 mm Type 97 machine gun in place of the tank's 37 mm gun.

=== Glider ===
Ku-6

General information
- Type: Winged tank
- National origin: Empire of Japan
- Manufacturer: Maeda Aircraft Corporation
- Status: Experimental
- Number built: 1

History
- Developed from: Type 98 Ke-Ni (ostensibly)

The glider developed for the Ku-Ro was the Maeda Ku-6 a 700 kg twin boom craft, which was specially designed to fit the tank. It was designed by The Aeronautical Institute of the Imperial University in Tokyo. It was designed with all the requirements that the Army's Troop Transport Command needed.

When mounted in the Ku-6 glider, the Ku-Ro had a wingspan of 22 m, a length of 12.8 m and a total weight of 4.2 tons. The glider was designed to be towed behind a Mitsubishi Ki-21 medium bomber. The tracks of the tank were unable to match Ki-21's take-off and landing speeds and since taking-off and landing would cause a great amount of damage from friction to the tracks, a pair of detachable skis were made part of the glider. The glider, after being launched and landing could quickly be disassembled and removed from the Ku-Ro tank.

==== Specifications ====
Data from Fighting gliders of World War II

General characteristics

- Crew: 2
- Capacity: 1 light tank (2,800 kg (6,174 lb)
- Wingspan: 21.9 m (71 ft 10 in)
- Wing area: 60.3 m^{2} (649 sq ft)
- Empty weight: 697.6 kg (1,538 lb)
- Gross weight: 3,498 kg (7,712 lb)

== Project fate ==
By 1945 the project was cancelled, even though Maeda had completed the prototype glider in January of that year. Only a mockup of the prototype tank had been completed by Mitsubishi. The cancellation was caused by a combination of technical problems, related to the poor maneuverability of the glider and stress on the tank, and the changing nature of the war for Japan. The Pacific War was going poorly for Japan by 1944. The Japanese had lost air supremacy to the United States Air Force and the chances of any large Japanese aircraft towing a glider being intercepted and shot down were very high and would mean not only the loss of the aircraft but the tank, as well. As with many innovative weapons projects launched by Japan in the final years of the war, production could not advance beyond the prototype stage due to material shortages, and the loss of Japan's industrial infrastructure to the Allied bombing of Japan.

== See also ==
- Winged tank
  - Antonov A-40, a Russian flying tank
  - Baynes Bat, an experimental British design
- Mk VII Tetrarch light tank
- Japanese tanks of World War II
