= List of aircraft of the Red Army Air Forces =

Here is a list of aircraft used by the Soviet Air Forces (VVS) during the Second World War.

== Fighter aircraft ==
- Bell P-39 Airacobra (5,007 supplied from the United States, 4,719 reached Soviet Union)
- Bell P-63 Kingcobra (2,421 supplied from the United States)
- Curtiss P-40 Kittyhawk/Tomahawk (2,425 supplied from the United States)
- Hawker Hurricane (2,952 supplied from UK)
- Lavochkin-Gorbunov-Gudkov LaGG-1 (100)
- Lavochkin-Gorbunov-Gudkov LaGG-3 (6,528)
- Lavochkin La-5 (9,920)
- Lavochkin La-7 (5,753)
- Lavochkin La-9 (1,559)
- Mikoyan-Gurevich MiG-1 (100)
- Mikoyan-Gurevich MiG-3 (3,422)
- North American P-51 Mustang (small numbers supplied)
- Petlyakov Pe-3
- Polikarpov I-15
- Polikarpov I-153
- Polikarpov I-16
- Republic P-47 Thunderbolt (195 supplied from the United States)
- Supermarine Spitfire (1,331 supplied from UK)
- Yakovlev Yak-1
- Yakovlev Yak-3
- Yakovlev Yak-7
- Yakovlev Yak-9

== Bomber and Attack Aircraft ==
- Arkhangelsky Ar-2
- De Havilland Mosquito
- Douglas A-20 Havoc (2,771 supplied from the United States)
- Handley Page Hampden (23 supplied by the United Kingdom)
- Ilyushin DB-3
- Ilyushin Il-2 Shturmovik
- Ilyushin Il-4
- Ilyushin Il-10 Shturmovik
- North American B-25 Mitchell (862 supplied from the United States)
- Petlyakov Pe-2
- Petlyakov Pe-8
- Polikarpov Po-2
- Sukhoi Su-2
- Tupolev SB
- Tupolev TB-3
- Tupolev Tu-2
- Yakovlev Yak-2
- Yakovlev Yak-4
- Yermolayev Yer-2

== Reconnaissance/Patrol Aircraft ==
- Beriev Be-2
- Beriev Be-4
- Beriev MBR-2
- Consolidated PBY/PBN Catalina (186 supplied through lend-lease from US)
- Curtiss O-52 Owl (19 supplied through lend-lease from US)
- Kharkov R-10
- Polikarpov Po-2
- Polikarpov R-5
- Polikarpov R-Z
- Tupolev ANT-7
- Vought OS2U Kingfisher (20 supplied through lend-lease from US)

== Transport Aircraft ==
- Antonov A-7
- Armstrong Whitworth Albemarle (12 supplied by the United Kingdom)
- Curtiss C-46 Commando (1 supplied through lend-lease from the US)
- Douglas C-47 Skytrain (707 supplied through lend-lease from the US)
- Gribovsky G-11
- Kolesnikov-Tsibin KC-20
- Lisunov Li-2
- Polikarpov Po-2
- Tupolev ANT-9
- Tupolev TB-1
- Tupolev TB-3
- Vultee PS-43 (licence built Vultee V-11GB)
- Yakovlev Yak-6

== Trainers ==
- North American T-6 Texan (82 supplied through lend-lease from US)
- Polikarpov U-2
- Yakovlev UT-1
- Yakovlev UT-2
- Yakovlev Yak-7U

== Weapons and munitions ==
=== Machine guns ===
- 7.7-mm (0.303-inch) Browning Mk II machine gun
- 7.7-mm (0.303-inch) Vickers K machine gun
- 7.62-mm (0.30-inch) M.1919 Browning machine gun
- 7.62-mm (0.30-inch) DA machine gun
- 7.62-mm (0.30-inch) PV-1 machine gun
- 7.62-mm (0.30-inch) ShKAS machine gun
- 12.7-mm (0.50-inch) Berezin UB machine gun
- 12.7-mm (0.50-inch) Browning AN/M2 machine gun

=== Cannons ===
- 20-mm (0.79-inch) Hispano Mk.II cannon
- 20-mm (0.79-inch) ShVAK cannon
- 23-mm (0.91-inch) Volkov-Yartsev VYa-23 cannon
- 37-mm (1.46-inch) M4 autocannon
- 37-mm (1.5-inch) Nudelmam-Suranov cannon
- 45-mm (1.8-inch) Nudelman-Suranov cannon

=== Bombs ===
- FAB-25
- FAB-50
- FAB-100
- FAB-250
- FAB-500
- FAB-2000
- FAB-5000 bomb
- KhAB-500
- PTAB (bomb)
- Molotov bread basket

=== Rockets ===
- RS-82 and RS-132 Rockets
- BETAB-750DS rocket

=== Torpedoes ===
- 450-mm (17.17 inch) Type 45-36AN torpedo

== See also ==
- List of military aircraft of the Soviet Union and the CIS

== Bibliography ==
- Gordon, Yefim (2008). Soviet Air Power in World War 2. Hinckley, UK: Midland Publishing. ISBN 978-1-85780-304-4.
