= Winged tank =

Tanks towed behind, or carried under, an airplane, to glide into a battlefield

Winged tanks were the subject of several unsuccessful experiments in the 20th century. It was intended that these could be towed behind, or carried under, an airplane, to glide into a battlefield, in support of infantry forces.

In war, airborne forces use parachutes to drop soldiers behind enemy lines to capture and hold important objectives until more heavily equipped friendly troops can arrive. Military planners have always sought ways to provide airborne troops with combat support equipment in the form of light armored vehicles or artillery which can be dropped by parachute or military glider.

The problem with air-dropping vehicles is that their crews drop separately, and may be delayed or prevented from bringing them into action. Military gliders allow crews to arrive at the drop zone along with their vehicles. They also minimize exposure of the valuable towing aircraft, which need not appear over the battlefield. An improvement would be a tank which could glide into the battlefield, drop its wings, and be ready to fight within minutes. This would allow the crew to immediately begin operation.

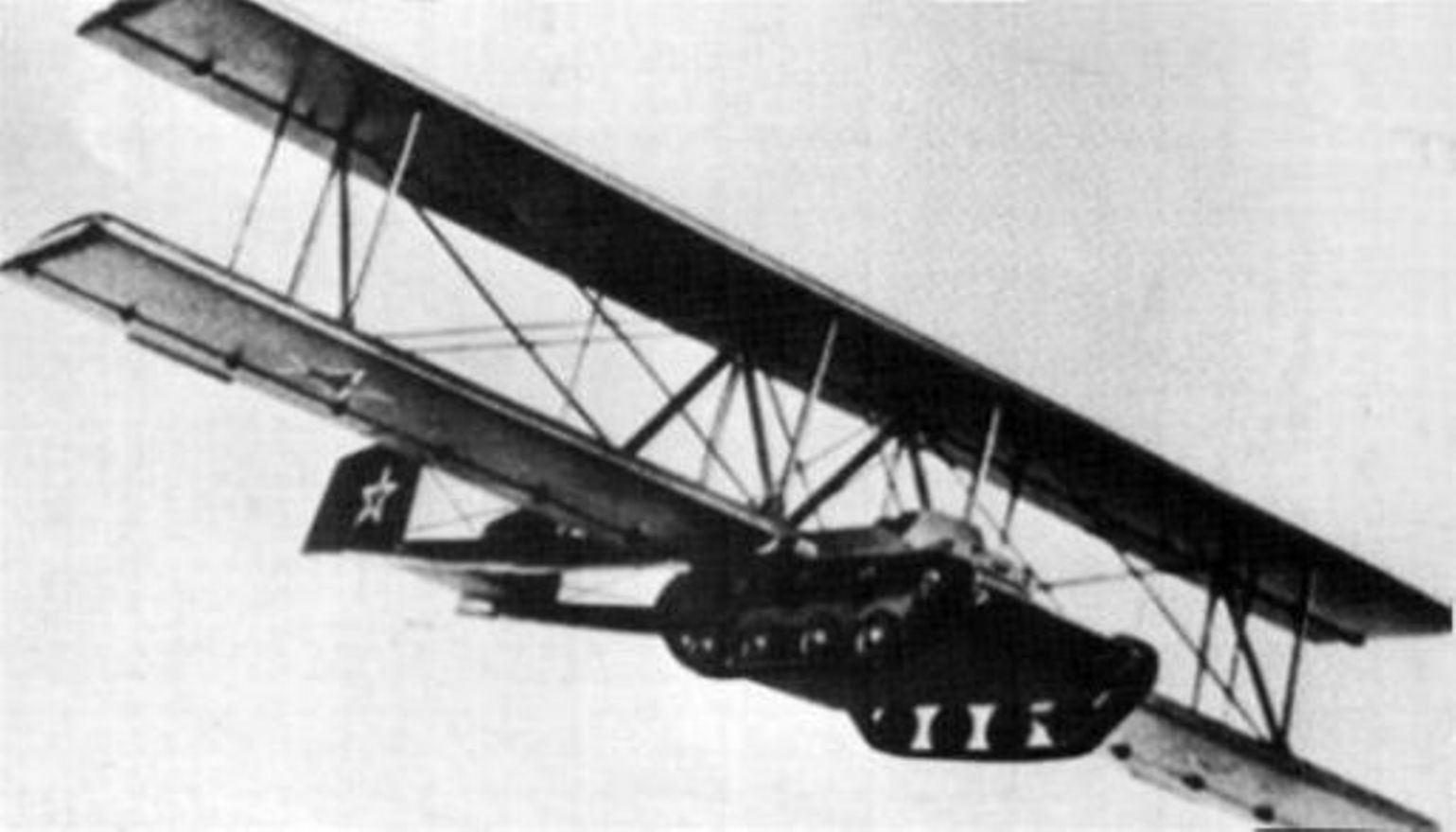
Designer's model of the Antonov A-40

== Development ==
=== United States ===
In the early 1930s, American engineer J. Walter Christie experimented with the concept of a self-powered flying tank. Christie's design had a detachable set of wings attached to the roof of a lightly armoured tank and a propeller driven by the tank's engine. A prototype without wings was constructed, but the concept was never developed further.

=== Soviet experiments ===
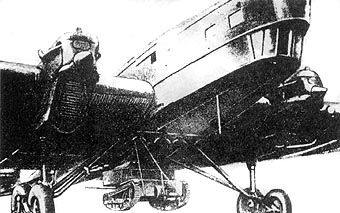
TB-3 bomber carrying a T-27 tankette, 1935

In 1930, the Grokhovskiy Special Design Bureau experimented with dropping "air buses" full of troops: the bicycle-wheeled G-45 onto land, and the amphibious "hydro bus" into water. When the hydro bus disintegrated on landing, the chief designer and his assistant were strapped into the G-45 for a test drop; they survived, but the project was cancelled.

Later, the Soviets used heavy bombers to land on the battlefield carrying T-27 tankettes and T-37 tank light tanks, and experimented with air-dropping light tanks (both with and without parachutes). In 1941, airborne units were issued T-40 amphibious tanks.

None of these were completely satisfactory, so in 1942 the Soviet Air Force ordered Oleg Antonov to design a glider for landing tanks. Antonov was more ambitious, and instead added a detachable cradle to a lightened T-60 light tank, bearing large wood and fabric biplane wings and twin tail. Although one semi-successful test flight was completed, due to the lack of sufficiently powerful aircraft to tow it at the required 160 km/h, the project was abandoned.

=== Japanese projects ===
The Imperial Japanese Army's experimental Special No. 3 Flying Tank So-Ra or Ku-Ro, was developed in 1943. Like the Soviet models, it had detachable wings, but it could also be transported by heavy gliders, namely the Kokusai Ku-7 "Buzzard" and Kokusai Ku-8 I "Gander". These could be towed by aircraft such as the Mitsubishi Ki-21 "Sally" heavy bomber. However, the Japanese Flying Tank project was abandoned before it went into production. The tank transport gliders were deployed to the Philippines during 1944. Another prototype was Maeda Ku-6 Flying Tank, but it also did not advance to experimental phases.

=== United Kingdom ===
In 1941, L.E. Baynes produced a design for a 100 ft (30 m) wingspan "Carrier Wing Glider", a large tailless wing to carry a tank. A reduced scale experimental glider – the Baynes Bat – was tested. It was satisfactory but the project was dropped and work on gliders that could carry vehicles internally was taken up. This led to the Airspeed Horsa and General Aircraft Hamilcar that could carry a Jeep and a light tank respectively.

=== After World War II ===
The Soviet Union continued to develop methods to efficiently deploy airborne vehicles, but focusing on parachute deployment from large fixed-wing aircraft instead, in an effort to render their "winged infantry" fully mechanized as well. By the mid-1970s, they were able to drop BMD-1s with crew members aboard, using a combination of a parachute and retrorocket.

== See also ==
- Military glider
- Messerschmitt Me 321 and Junkers Ju 322, German gliders designed to be capable of carrying light armored vehicles.
- The T-80 and T-84 have also been nicknamed Flying Tank for their speed
- The M22 Locust is an American Light Tank used for the British Airborne that is suspended under a C-54 Skymaster or a General Aircraft Hamilcar glider but not as a winged tank, but as a glider under the Skymaster or inside the Glider.
- Light Tank Mk VII Tetrarch, Also available for the British Airborne that be put on a General Aircraft Hamilcar glider.
