= G28 =

G28 may refer to:

- BMW i3 (G28), an electric vehicle
- Brazilian landing ship Garcia D'Avila (G28)
- Brazilian landing ship Mattoso Maia (G28)
- Gribovsky G-28, a Soviet aircraft
- Heckler & Koch G28, a German battle rifle
- G28 - Auto Home, a G-code from Marlin used for homing a 3D printer
