= Gribovsky G-28 =

General information
- Type: Advanced trainer
- National origin: USSR
- Designer: Vladislav Gribovsky

History
- First flight: 22 May 1941

The Gribovsky G-28 (Russian: Грибовский Г-28, VVS designation TI-28) was an advanced trainer for trainee fighter pilots, built in the USSR just before the German invasion in 1941. It satisfied VVS testing but changing priorities led to the abandonment of production plans.

== Design and development ==
The TI in the VVS name for the G-28 indicated its function as a Trenirovochni Istrebitel or Fighter Trainer. After basic training a prospective fighter pilot could gain experience of the characteristics of a quite fast, manoeuvrable, single seat, enclosed cockpit aircraft, fitted with guns or bombs. It was, like all earlier Gribovsky aircraft, almost entirely of wooden construction.

Its cantilever low wing had two wooden spars and was plywood skinned. The ailerons were fabric covered duralumin frames and the inboard, pneumatically activated flaps were also duralumin. In plan the wing was strongly tapered, mostly on the trailing edge, carefully faired into the fuselage at the wing roots and ending in elliptical tips.

The G-28 was powered by a 201 kW (270 hp) MV-6 six cylinder inverted in-line engine, driving a two blade variable pitch propeller. The engine was on a steel tube mounting and enclosed in a light-alloy cowling. The fuselage was a wooden monocoque with an integral fin. A cockpit with a sliding, multi-panel canopy was situated over the trailing wing root, merging into the raised upper rear fuselage behind it. At the rear the tailplane was mounted on the upper fuselage. Both elevators and the rudder were aerodynamically balanced, fabric covered dural structures. In plan the horizontal tail was elliptical, with a small cut out for movement of the curved rudder, which extended down to the keel.

Though the G-28 had some of the characteristics of contemporary fighters, it differed in having a fixed tailwheel undercarriage. Each unfaired main wheel was on a cantilever oleo leg from the forward spar; the tailwheel castored. Its armament was simple, with a single machine gun aimed with a reflector sight and monitored with a wing root camera. A pair of underwing racks could each carry two bombs with weights up to 40 kg (88 lb).

The G-28 first flew on 22 May 1941. It was flight tested by the VVS and found satisfactory, though Gribovsky hoped to install the more powerful MV-6A engine variant in production aircraft. After the German invasion of the USSR in June 1941, Gribovsky's priority became production of the Gribovsky G-11 assault glider and the G-28 was abandoned.

== Specifications ==
Data from Gunston (1995) pp.81-2

General characteristics

- Crew: One
- Length: 7.66 m (25 ft 2 in)
- Wingspan: 9.0 m (29 ft 6 in)
- Height: 1.45 m (4 ft 9 in)
- Wing area: 11.6 m^{2} (125 sq ft)
- Airfoil: RAF 34
- Empty weight: 897 kg (1,978 lb)
- Gross weight: 1,157 kg (2,551 lb) without bombs
- Powerplant: 1 × MV-6 6-cylinder inverted air-cooled piston engine, 200 kW (270 hp)
- Propellers: 2-bladed Ratier

Performance

- Maximum speed: 303 km/h (188 mph, 164 kn) at 1,600 m (5,200 ft); 275 km/h (171 mph; 148 kn) at sea level
- Range: 500 km (310 mi, 270 nmi) at 90% of maximum speed
- Service ceiling: 6,600 m (21,700 ft)
- Time to altitude: 19.4 min to 5,000 m (16,000 ft)
- Landing speed: 90.5 km/h (56 mph) with flaps
