= DI-6 =

DI-6 or Di 6 may refer to:

- Kochyerigin DI-6, two-seat fighter biplane produced in Soviet Union
- NSB Di 6, class of diesel-electric locomotives built by Siemens
