= I17 =

I17 may also refer to:

- Interstate 17, an Interstate Highway located entirely within the state of Arizona, United States
- Japanese submarine I-17, a B1 type submarine of the Imperial Japanese Navy
- Polikarpov I-17, a Soviet single-seat fighter prototype
- Bohuslän Regiment (I 17), a Swedish Army regiment
- iPhone 17, a 2025 smartphone by Apple Inc.
