= Bristol XLRQ =

1942 prototype amphibious glider

XLRQ
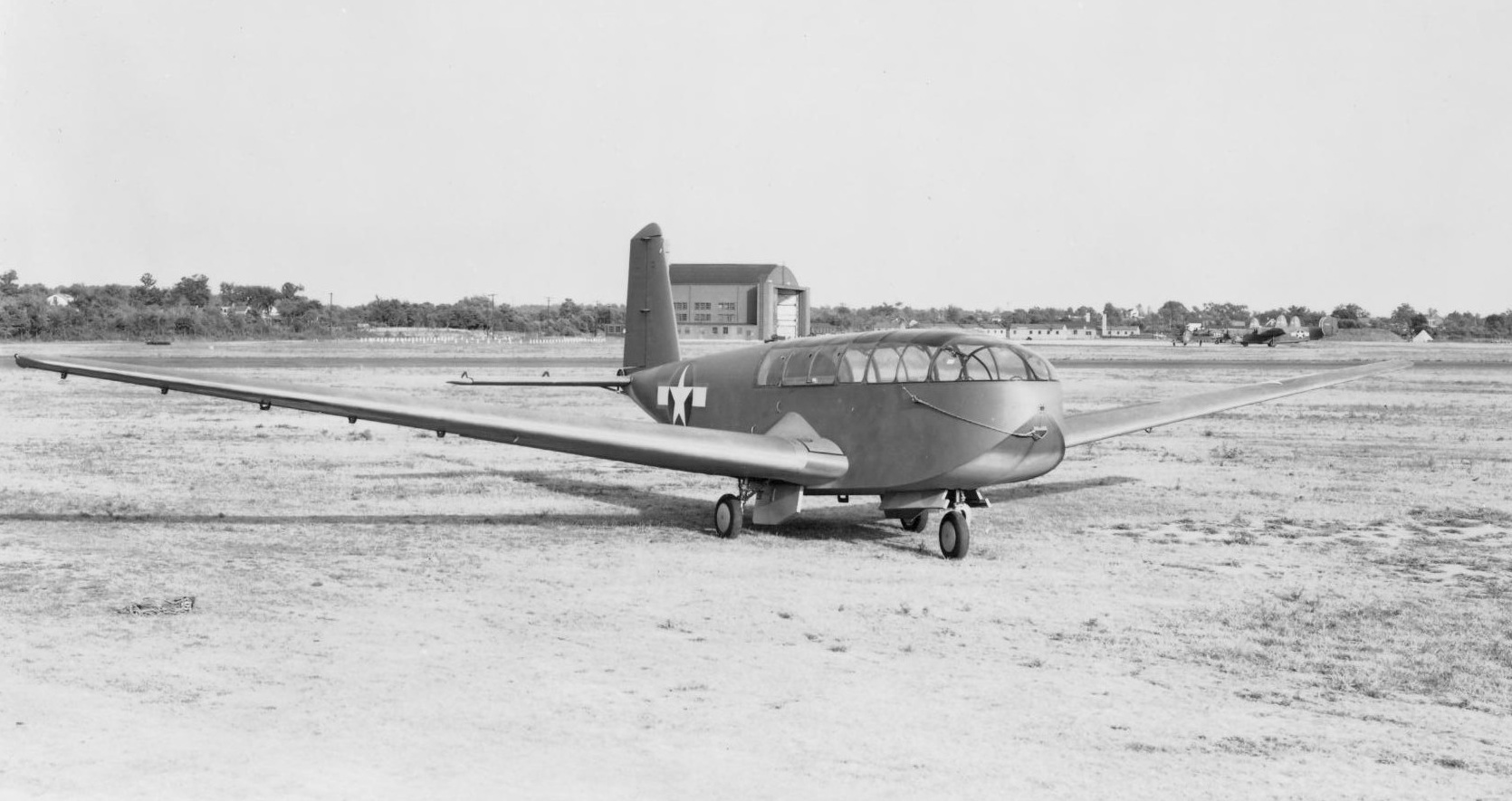
- Bristol XLRQ-1 glider in 1943

General information
- Type: Transport flying boat glider
- Manufacturer: Bristol Aeronautical Corporation
- Primary user: United States Navy
- Number built: 2

History
- First flight: January 1943

The Bristol XLRQ-1 was a 12-seat amphibious glider of the Bristol Aeronautical Corporation, New Haven, Connecticut (USA), developed for the United States Marine Corps in 1942-43. Only two prototypes were built before the USMC scrapped the idea of glider use in 1943.

== Development ==
Inspired by the use of gliders by Germany, the United States Navy and USMC initiated a glider program in May 1941. Two glider types were envisioned, a 12-seat and a 24 seat-type. The Naval Aircraft Factory was requested to undertake preliminary design of the gliders, which were to be constructed of wood or composite materials. The idea was to have enough gliders to transport one battalion of Marines (715 men) with equipment. Consolidated PBYs should be used to tow the gliders. The Marines requested a glider capable of landing and take off from both land and water, be capable of static line parachute jumping and have exterior machine guns.

In 1942, the USMC established Marine Glider Group 71 at Page Field, Parris Island, South Carolina (USA), using the Schweizer LNS-1 and Pratt-Read LNE-1, later also Aeronca LNR-1 gliders for training. For towing the unit used N3N Canary biplane trainers and J2F Duck amphibians.

== Design ==
For the 12-seat type the beach assault role in mind, the U.S. Navy ordered prototypes, the Allied Aviation Corporation XLRA-1 and the Bristol Aeronautical Corporation XLRQ-1. Technically, the gliders were successful designs, and 100 of each were ordered. Also a licence production by the Naval Aircraft Factory as the LRN-1 was envisioned.

Although the U.S. Navy ordered four XLRQ-1 prototypes, only two were built (BuNos 11561 and 11562). The glider had a retractable landing gear and the wing roots provided lateral stability on the water.

However, glider assault was not tactically feasible against small, heavily defended islands in the Pacific, not enough gliders were arriving from factories and too many pilots were being assigned to the glider program. Therefore, the program was scrapped in 1943.

== Specifications (XLRQ-1) ==
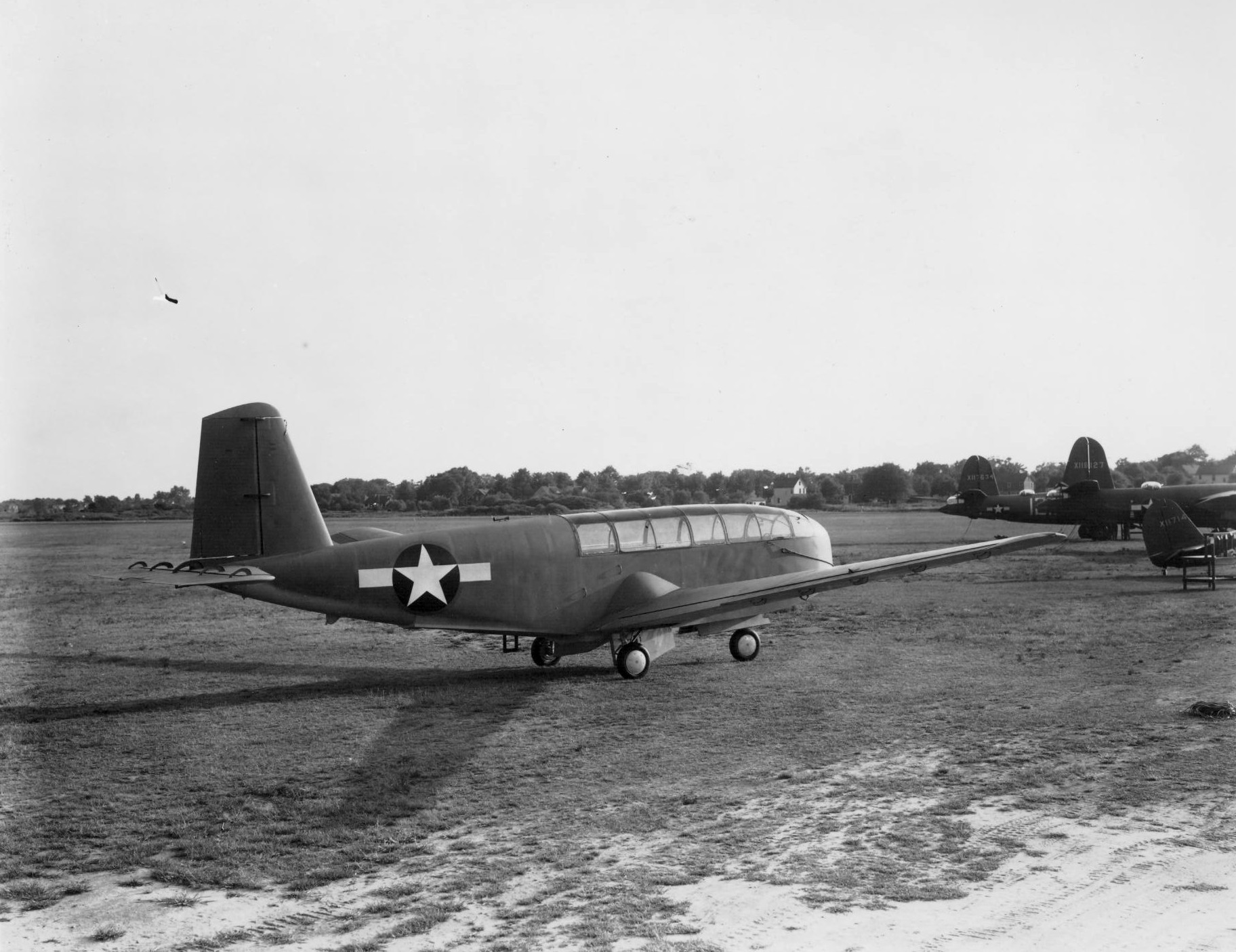
Bristol XLRQ-1 in 1943.

Data from , Fighting gliders of World War II

General characteristics

- Crew: 2
- Capacity: 10 Marines, equipped
- Length: 43 ft 6 in (13.26 m)
- Wingspan: 71 ft (22 m)
- Height: 16 ft (4.9 m)
- Wing area: 500 sq ft (46 m^{2})

Performance

== See also ==
Aircraft of comparable role, configuration, and era

- Allied Aviation XLRA
- Waco CG-4

Related lists

- List of United States Navy aircraft designations (pre-1962)
