= Allied Aviation =

Aircraft component manufacturer

The Allied Aviation Corporation was established in Cockeysville, Maryland, in January 1941 to manufacture laminated plywood components for aircraft. The firm also developed its own flying boat transport glider for the United States Navy, the LRA, which was built in small numbers for testing, but the larger LR2A was not proceeded with.

Allied Aviation acquired the rights to Gilbert Trimmers 'Trimcraft' small amphibious aircraft as the Trimmer. Production of prototype Trimmers was taken up by Commonwealth Aircraft Company as the Commonwealth C-170 Trimmer.

Following World War II, the company changed direction to focus on sailboat manufacture.

== Aircraft ==
Summary of aircraft built by the Allied Aviation Corporation
| Model name | First flight | Number built | Type |
|---|---|---|---|
| Allied Aviation LRA | 1943 | 2 | Flying boat Military glider |
| Allied Aviation (Commonwealth C-170) Trimmer | 1947 | 2 | Amphibian flying boat |
