= Ilyushin I-21 =

Soviet single-engine fighter aircraft prototype

General information
- Type: Fighter
- National origin: USSR
- Manufacturer: Ilyushin
- Number built: 2

History
- First flight: late 1936

The Ilyushin I-21, (Istrebitel-21, fighter-21), also known as TsKB-32, was a single-engined, single-seat fighter produced in the USSR in 1936-7 in response to a government specification.

== Design and development ==
The I-21 was an all-metal, low-wing, cantilever monoplane with retractable undercarriage and a closed cockpit. The wings were sharply tapered with straight trailing edges, which introduced sweepback on the leading edge. Two specially modified Mikulin AM-34RNF (also written AM-34FRN) liquid-cooled V-12 engines provided the power via a non-reducing gearbox, which was used only to raise the thrust line, and enable the use of shorter undercarriage legs.

Cooling for the first prototype's engine used an evaporative system which dispensed with radiators and used condensers built into the surface of the wing centre section. The second prototype was fitted with a conventional cooling system using ethylene glycol coolant and a retractable radiator. Flight trials started but soon showed that the evaporative cooling system was inadequate with both the engine and the wing centre section overheating. Ilyushin was also very aware of the vulnerability of the system to combat damage, but he was ordered by GUAP to use this system. Further development was halted in 1939 and the I-21 designation was re-used for the Pashinin I-21.

== Variants ==
Data from:'OKB Ilyushin

TsKB 32
(I-21 1st prototype) with evaporative cooling
TsKB 52
(I-21 2nd prototype) with conventional ethylene glycol cooling system, not completed due to engine delivery problems.

== Specifications (I-21) ==
Data from OKB Ilyushin

General characteristics

- Crew: 1
- Length: 8.366 m (27 ft 5 in)
- Wingspan: 10 m (32 ft 10 in)
- Wing area: 18.16 m^{2} (195.5 sq ft)
- Empty weight: 1,402 kg (3,091 lb)
- Gross weight: 2,125 kg (4,685 lb)
- Powerplant: 1 × Mikulin AM-34FRN V-12 liquid-cooled piston engine, 930 kW (1,250 hp)
- Propellers: 3-bladed constant-speed propeller

Performance

- Maximum speed: 620 km/h (390 mph, 330 kn) at 5,000 m (16,000 ft)
- Range: 766 km (476 mi, 414 nmi) at 270 km/h (170 mph; 150 kn)

460 km (250 nmi; 290 mi) at 480 km/h (300 mph; 260 kn)

- Service ceiling: 12,000 m (39,000 ft)
- Rate of climb: 20.32 m/s (4,000 ft/min)
- Time to altitude: 5,000 metres (16,000 ft) in 3.8 to 4.6 minutes
- Wing loading: 116 kg/m^{2} (24 lb/sq ft)
- Power/mass: 0.59 hp/kg
- Take-off run: 190 m (620 ft)

Armament

- Guns:
- 4x 7.62 mm ShKAS machine guns (initial fit)
- 2x 20 mm ShVAK cannon (later fit)

== See also ==
Aircraft of comparable role, configuration, and era

- Polikarpov I-17
