= Baynes Bat =

1940s British experimental glider

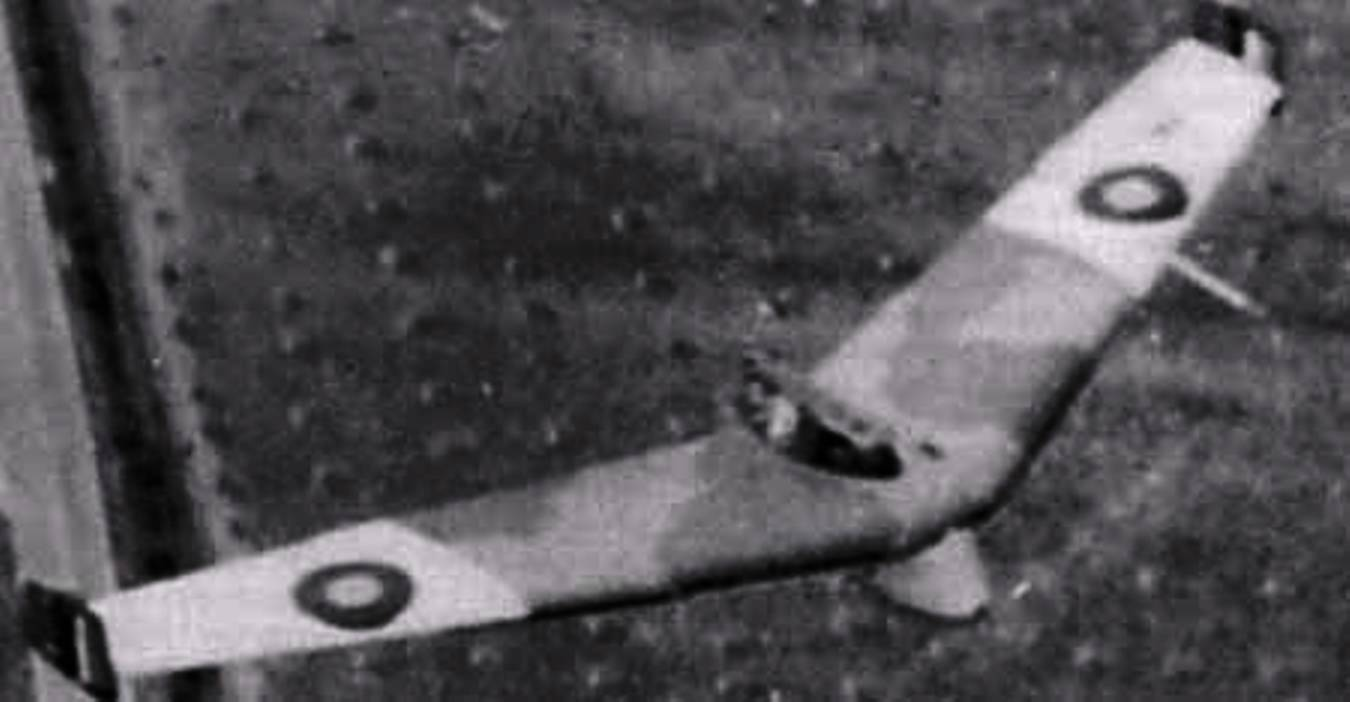

General information
- Type: Experimental glider
- Manufacturer: Slingsby
- Designer: L.E. Baynes AFRAeS
- Primary user: Royal Aircraft Establishment
- Number built: 1

History
- First flight: July 1943

The Baynes Bat (or sometimes Slingsby-Baynes Bat) was an experimental glider of the Second World War, designed by L. E. Baynes. It was used to test the tailless design that he had suggested as a means to convert tanks into temporary gliders so they could be flown into battle.

== Design and development ==
In the late 1930s, armies were looking for a way to airlift heavy military units. There were then no cargo aircraft big enough to lift a tank, and even if such a large aircraft had been created it would have needed many special facilities. A solution which was explored during the Second World War was to tow tanks as gliders, and for this wings had to be added. Most designs were based on straight wings with extended empennage and stabilizers. The design of L.E. Baynes AFRAeS in 1941 was for a 100 ft wingspan "Carrier Wing Glider" consisting chiefly of a swept wing with vertical stabilizers on the wingtips.

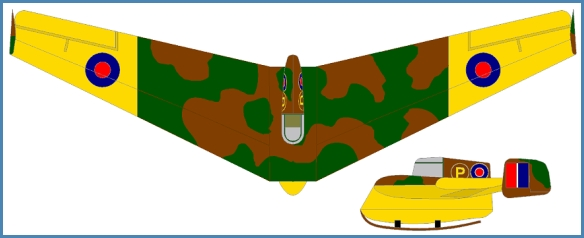
The KN Slingsby Baynes Bat design of 1941

A 1/3 scale prototype was built entirely of wood in 1943 by Slingsby Sailplanes at Kirkbymoorside, and the Baynes Bat made its first flight in July 1943 possibly at the Airborne Forces Experimental Establishment at RAF Sherburn-in-Elmet or most likely at RAF Snaith a few miles away, where other AFEE projects where also being tested. Snaith was a bomber station, so daytime testing was more possible than at Sherburn as it was also a fighter station with daytime operations and on grass runways where as Snaith had 3 long concrete runways and associated support facilities. Most of the test flights were piloted by Flight Lieutenant Robert Kronfeld.

Tests were successful, but the project was abandoned because a suitable tank was not then available and a decision had been made to develop gliders which could carry heavy equipment within their fuselages. The strategists were not convinced of the practicality of retrieving large numbers of Baynes Bats from the field, but in wartime this was not a critical factor.

The one Bat which had been built was the first tailless monoplane with flaps to be available for research and it was flown extensively by the Royal Aircraft Establishment to test the stability and control of tailless aircraft. The Bat was sold as surplus in October 1946 and entered on the British Gliding Association register in November 1947. The Bat was last seen in 1958, lying behind a hangar at Croydon Airport.

== Operators ==
United Kingdom

- Airborne Forces Experimental Establishment
- Royal Aircraft Establishment

== Specifications ==
Data from Aeroplane Monthly & Ellison 1971.

General characteristics

- Crew: one
- Length: 11 ft 4 in (3.46 m)
- Wingspan: 33 ft 4 in (10.16 m)
- Height: 4 ft 4.8 in (1.340 m)
- Wing area: 160.0 sq ft (14.86 m^{2})
- Aspect ratio: 7
- Empty weight: 763 lb (346.1 kg)
- Gross weight: 963 lb (436.8 kg)

Performance

- Maximum speed: 120 mph (193 km/h, 104 kn)
- Cruise speed: 80 mph (129 km/h, 70 kn)
- Stall speed: 40 mph (64 km/h, 35 kn)
- Wing loading: 6.0 lb/sq ft (29.3 kg/m^{2})

== See also ==
- Antonov A-40 - the Soviet "Flying Tank"
- General Aircraft Hamilcar, a British glider introduced during the war to carry light tanks.
- Tetrarch tank - a British tank light enough to be carried by air
