= Elizaveta Shahkhatuni =

Soviet–Ukrainian aeronautical engineer (1911–2011)

- Ելիզավետա Շահխաթունի (Armenian); Елизавета Аветовна Шахатуни (Russian)
- Born: 22 December 1911; Yerevan, Erivan Governorate, Russian Empire (now Armenia)
- Died: 28 October 2011 (aged 99); Kyiv, Ukraine
- Other names: Yelyzaveta Shahatuni; Jelysaweta Schachatuni

Elizaveta Shahkhatuni (Armenian: Ելիզավետա Շահխաթունի, Russian: Елизавета Аветовна Шахатуни; 22 December 1911 – 28 October 2011) was a Soviet-Armenian aeronautical engineer and university teacher. She was the second of three wives of Oleg Antonov.

== Early life and education ==
Elizaveta Avetovna Shahkhatuni was born in present-day Armenia in December 1911. Her mother was a teacher, while her father Awetis Schachatunjan was a Transcaucasian politician and one of the exponents of the Armenian Revolutionary Federation. Shahkhatuni left school to study in the engineering faculty of the Yerevan State University for two years. She then joined the Moscow Aviation Institute (MAI) in 1930. Shahkhatuni started there in second year of the course. She worked in the circle of glider pilots.

== Career ==
After graduating in 1935, she started working in the aviation industry. By 1937, though interested in strength and stability calculations Shahkhatuni had become a weapons and equipment specialist in the Moscow Ilyushin aircraft plant. Within six months, she managed to move to a small civilian glider factory in Tushino. Shahkhatuni remained there until 1939. The chief designer there was Oleg Konstantinovich Antonov.

In 1941 Antonov was ordered to organize glider production in Kaunas and he selected Shahkhatuni for his design office. Shahkhatuni married Antonov before the start of the German-Soviet war. Once the war broke out the whole engineering office was evacuated to Moscow. Shahkhatuni worked in the Yakovlev engineering office until 1945. Shahkhatuni carried out the strength calculations for the double-decker glider for air transport armored vehicles and later when Antonov was working in the Novosibirsk aircraft plant in 1946, she led the department which completed the strength calculations for the SChA-1 biplane, the forerunner of the Antonov An-2.

Shahkhatuni become a professor and doctor of technical science and taught at the Kyiv Institute of Civil Aviation Engineers. She continued to work on the calculations for Antonov's airplane designs including among other things invented a welding - bonding process with which the aircraft service life was significantly increased.

After her death on 28 October 2011 there was an Armenian funeral service on October 30, 2011 and a civil service on October 31. Shahkhatuni was buried with Armenian earth in the Baikove Cemetery in Kyiv.

== Awards ==
Shahkhatuni's awards included;

- Lenin Prize (1962) for the development of the Antonov An-22
- Order of Lenin
- Order of the Red Banner of Labour
- Order of the Badge of Honour
