= Waco CG-3 =

American military glider

CG-3A
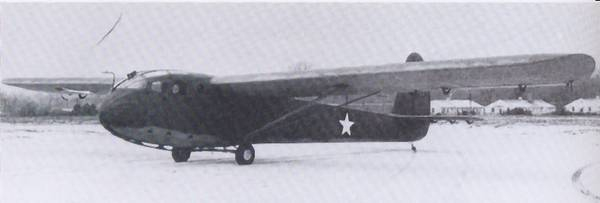

General information
- Type: Military glider
- Manufacturer: Commonwealth Aircraft, Inc.
- Designer: Waco Aircraft Company
- Primary user: United States
- Number built: 100

History
- First flight: Early February 1942

The Waco CG-3A was a United States light troop military glider of World War II.

== Design and development ==
The CG-3A was the United States Army Air Force's first production troop-carrying glider. 300 CG-3A 9-place gliders were initially ordered, but 200 of these were cancelled. A few of the 100 built by Commonwealth Aircraft (formerly Rearwin Aircraft) were used as trainers for the improved CG-4A, but most remained in their shipping crates in storage. The production CG-3A was developed from the experimental XCG-3 which was the only one built by Waco and given Army Air Forces Serial No. 41-29617.

== Operational history ==
The CG-3A became obsolete with the development of the much improved Waco designed CG-4A 15-place glider with its alternate load of military equipment. The CG-3A did not see any combat and several were used in limited training roles.

== Variants ==
- XCG-3 : Prototype 8-seat glider. One built 1942.
- CG-3A : Production 9-seat glider. 100 built by Commonwealth Aircraft.

== Specifications (CG-3A) ==
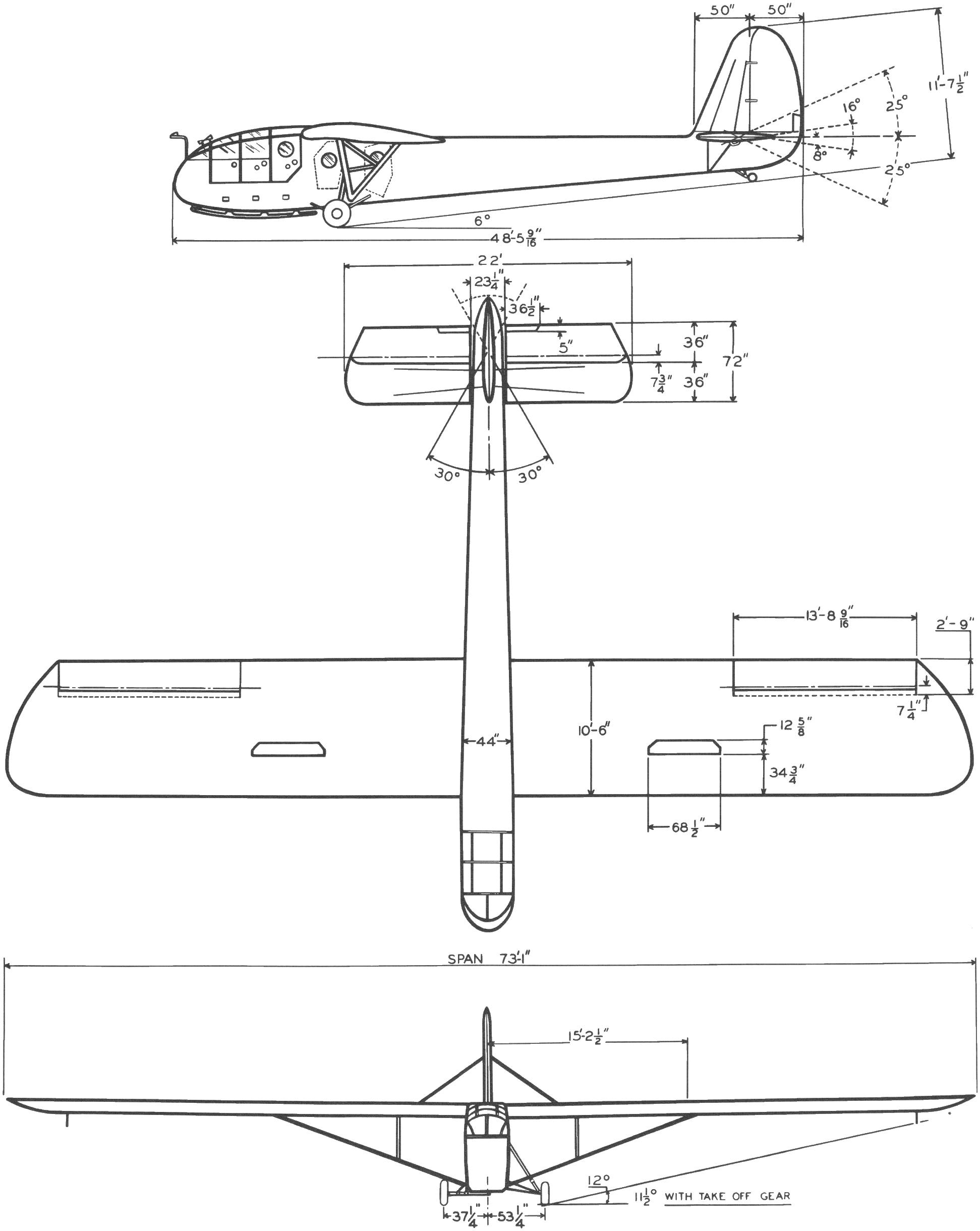
3-view line drawing of the Waco CG-3A

Data from The Concise Guide to American Aircraft of World War II

General characteristics

- Crew: 2
- Capacity: 7 troops
- Length: 43 ft 4 in (13.21 m)
- Wingspan: 73 ft 1 in (22.28 m)
- Empty weight: 2,044 lb (927 kg)
- Max takeoff weight: 4,400 lb (1,996 kg)

Performance

- Maximum speed: 120 mph (190 km/h, 100 kn) (under tow)
- Cruise speed: 100 mph (160 km/h, 87 kn)
- Minimum control speed: 38 mph (61 km/h, 33 kn)

== See also ==
Aircraft of comparable role, configuration, and era

- Airspeed Horsa
- Antonov A-7
- DFS 230
- General Aircraft Hotspur
- Gribovsky G-11
- Kokusai Ku-8
- Schweizer cargo glider designs
- Slingsby Hengist
- Waco CG-4

Related lists

- List of aircraft of World War II
- List of World War II military gliders
