= Tsybin Ts-25 =

1940s Soviet military transport glider by Tsybin

Ts-25

General information
- Type: Military transport glider
- Manufacturer: Tsybin OKB-256
- Designer: P. V. Tsybin
- Status: Retired
- Primary users: Soviet Air Forces Czechoslovak Air Force
- Number built: 480

History
- Manufactured: 1948-1954
- Introduction date: 1948

The Tsybin Ts-25 (USAF/DoD designation: Type 25; NATO reporting name: Mist) was a military glider designed by Pavel Tsybin for use by the Soviet Air Forces as a transport aircraft. Built in significant numbers, it saw service with the Soviet Airborne Forces in the late 1940s and early 1950s.

== Design and development ==
Designed by Pavel Tsybin to a 1944 specification, the Ts-25 was of a high-wing design, with a box-shaped fuselage featuring a hinged nose for ease of loading the aircraft's cargo. The aircraft had a fixed tricycle landing gear, with skids to aid in landing, and was of steel-tube-braced wooden construction with the nose covered in fabric. The fuselage was otherwise covered in plywood; the wing was tapered, with its spar being steel-tube strut braced. The intended load of the aircraft consisted of a jeep-type vehicle and a 57 mm (2.2 in) anti-tank gun.

== Operational history ==
Following flight tests that completed in 1948, the Ts-25 was accepted for production; it is regarded as the first domestically produced glider to be built in significant quantities for the Soviet Airborne Forces (VDV). It was first publicly displayed at the 1948 Tushino Air Display. Eventually up to 480 of the aircraft were built at the Chkalovsk manufacturing plant between 1948 and 1954. Some were used by the VDV in training maneuvers. One was modified with 25 passenger seats for evaluation for potential civilian use on routes including Moscow, Gorki, and Novosibirsk. Two were supplied to the Czechoslovak Air Force in 1952 and given the designation NK-25; the Yakovlev Yak-14 was preferred by the Czechs.

In 1950 two Ts-25s, towed by Ilyushin Il-12 transports, were used to resupply Polar Station SP-2.

== Variants ==
Ts-25
Main production version, 480 built.
Ts-25M
Powered version; one built. Powered by two Shvetsov M-11FR-1 radial engines each producing 165 hp (123 kW).
NK-25
Czech designation for Ts-25.

== Operators ==
Czechoslovakia

- Czechoslovak Air Force

Soviet Union

- Soviet Air Forces

== Specifications (Ts-25) ==
Data from

General characteristics

- Crew: two pilots
- Capacity: 25 troops or 2,500 kg (5,500 lb) cargo
- Length: 16.15 m (52 ft 11.8 in)
- Wingspan: 24.38 m (79 ft 11.875 in)
- Height: 5 m (16 ft 5 in)
- Wing area: 75.0 m^{2} (807 sq ft)
- Empty weight: 1,787 kg (3,940 lb)
- Max takeoff weight: 4,200 kg (9,259 lb)

Performance

- Maximum speed: 230 km/h (140 mph, 120 kn) in tow
- Landing speed: 90 km/h (56 mph; 49 kn)

== See also ==
Aircraft of comparable role, configuration, and era

- Chase XCG-20
- General Aircraft Hamilcar
- Gotha Go 242
- Gribovsky G-11
- Yakovlev Yak-14

Related lists

- List of Russian/USSR gliders
