= Polikarpov VIT-1 =

Soviet Polikarpov prototype fighter

- Note the long barrels of the 37 mm guns

General information
- Type: ground attack
- National origin: Soviet Union
- Manufacturer: Polikarpov
- Status: cancelled
- Number built: 1

History
- First flight: 1937
- Variant: Polikarpov VIT-2

The Polikarpov VIT-1 (Russian: Vozdooshny Istrebitel' Tahnkov— Flying Tank Destroyer) was a Soviet twin-engined multi-purpose aircraft developed before World War II. One prototype was built in 1937, with an extremely heavy armament for ground attack duties. That was the only example built as it was decided to revise the design with more powerful engines as the VIT-2.

== Development ==
The Polikarpov design bureau (OKB) was ordered, in 1936, to begin development of a fast twin-engined aircraft that could be used for ground attack duties and as a heavy fighter. It delivered the ground attack version the following year for evaluation, although it could be modified as necessary for other roles. The VIT-1 was reasonably successful, but it was decided to give it more powerful engines and modify its structure. The improved aircraft was designated as the VIT-2.

The VIT-1 was a low-winged, twin-engined aircraft with a mixed structure. The monocoque fuselage was made in halves of 'shpon', molded birch plywood. The wing and tail structures were built from a mix of steel tubes and duralumin with a duralumin skin. The VIT-1 had the first metal-skinned control surfaces in the USSR. The main legs of the conventional landing gear retracted aft into the engine nacelles, but the tailwheel was fixed. The nose was extensively glazed to give the bombardier/navigator good visibility and he was armed with a 20 mm (0.79 in) ShVAK cannon with 10° of vertical travel. The rear gunner/radio operator sat behind the pilot in a manually operated turret armed with a 7.62 mm (0.300 in) ShKAS machine gun. Two 37 mm (1.5 in) Shpitalnyi Sh-37 cannon were mounted in the wing roots with very prominent barrels. Up to 600 kg (1,300 lb) of bombs could be carried internally in the fuselage or a pair of 500 kg (1,100 lb) FAB-500 bombs could be carried under the wings. It used a pair of 716 kW (960 hp) Klimov M-103 inline engines driving 3-bladed propellers.

== Specifications ==
Data from Gordon, Soviet Airpower in World War 2

General characteristics

- Crew: 3
- Length: 12.7 m (41 ft 8 in)
- Wingspan: 16.5 m (54 ft 2 in)
- Wing area: 40.4 m^{2} (435 sq ft)
- Airfoil: Clark YH
- Empty weight: 4,013 kg (8,847 lb)
- Gross weight: 6,453 kg (14,226 lb)
- Powerplant: 2 × Klimov M-103 liquid-cooled V12 engines, 716 kW (960 hp) each
- Propellers: 3-bladed

Performance

- Maximum speed: 530 km/h (330 mph, 290 kn) at 3,000 metres (9,843 ft)
- Range: 1,000 km (620 mi, 540 nmi)
- Service ceiling: 8,000 m (26,000 ft)

Armament

- Guns:
- 2 x 37 mm Sh-37 cannon
- 1x 20 mm ShVAK cannon
- 1x 7.62 mm ShKAS machine gun
- Bombs: up to a total of 1,000 kg (2,200 lb)

== See also ==
Aircraft of comparable role, configuration, and era

- Henschel Hs 129
- Messerschmitt Bf 110
- Potez 630
