= Antonov A-40 =

Soviet winged tank prototype (1930-1942)

Antonov A-40 Krylya Tanka
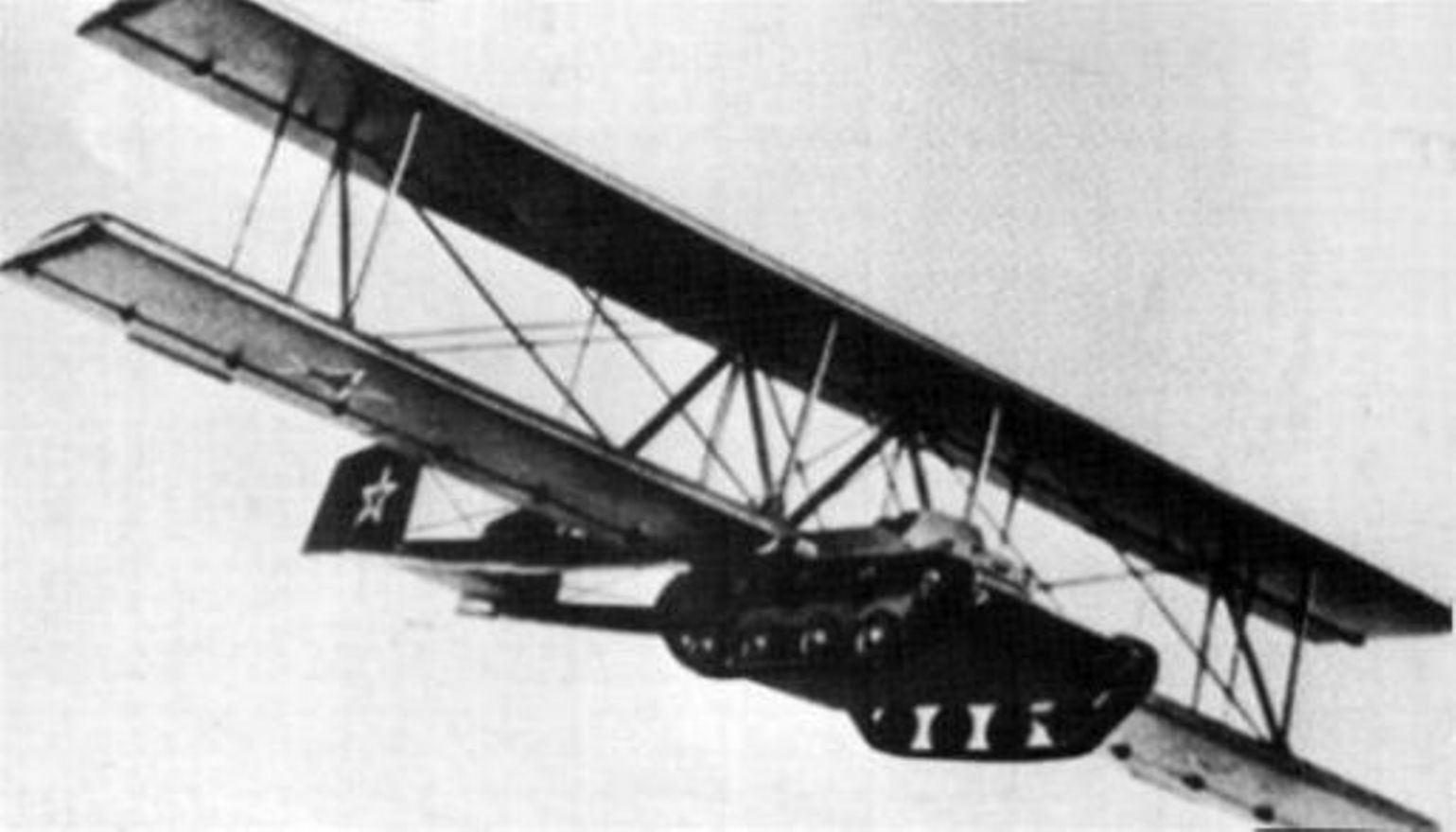
- Designer's model of the Antonov A-40

General information
- Type: Glider
- Manufacturer: Antonov
- Designer: Oleg Antonov
- Status: Cancelled
- Primary user: Soviet Air Force
- Number built: 1

History
- First flight: 1942
- Developed from: T-60 tank

The Antonov A-40 Krylya Tanka (Russian: крылья танка, meaning "tank wings") was a Soviet attempt to allow a tank to glide onto a battlefield after being towed aloft by an airplane, to support airborne forces or partisans. A prototype was built and tested in 1942, but was found to be unworkable. This vehicle is sometimes called the A-40T or KT.

== Design and development ==
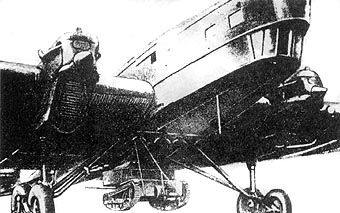
TB-3 bomber carrying a T-27 tankette, 1935

Instead of loading light tanks onto gliders, as other nations had done, Soviet airborne forces had strapped T-27 tankettes underneath heavy bombers and landed them on airfields. In the 1930s, there were experimental efforts to parachute tanks or simply drop them into water. During the 1940 occupation of Bessarabia, light tanks may have been dropped from a few meters up by TB-3 bombers, which, as long as the gearbox was in neutral, would allow them to roll to a stop.

The biggest problem with air-dropping vehicles is if their crews are dropped separately, they may be delayed or prevented from bringing them into action. Gliders allow crews to arrive at the drop/landing zone along with their vehicles. They also minimize exposure of the valuable towing aircraft, which need not appear over the battlefield. So the Soviet Air Force ordered Oleg Antonov to design a glider for landing tanks.

Antonov was more ambitious. Instead of building a glider, he added a detachable cradle to a T-60 light tank bearing large wood and fabric biplane wings and a twin tail. Such a tank could glide into the battlefield, drop its wings, and be ready to fight within minutes.

One T-60 was converted into a glider in 1942, intended to be towed by a Petlyakov Pe-8 or a Tupolev TB-3. The tank was lightened for air use by removing its armament, ammunition and headlights, and leaving a very limited amount of fuel. Even with these modifications, the TB-3 bomber had to ditch the glider during its only flight, on September 2, 1942, to avoid crashing, due to the T-60's extreme drag (although the tank reportedly glided smoothly). The A-40 was piloted by the famous Soviet experimental glider pilot Sergei Anokhin. The T-60 landed in a field near the airport, and after dropping the glider wings and tail, the driver returned it to its base. Due to the lack of a sufficiently powerful aircraft to tow it at the required 160 km/h (99 mph), the project was abandoned.

== Specifications ==
Antonov A-40

Data from The Osprey Encyclopedia of Russian Aircraft 1875–1995

General characteristics

- Crew: Two
- Capacity: 1 × T-60 tank
- Length: 12.06 m (39 ft 6.75 in)
- Wingspan: 18.00 m (59 ft 0.75 in)
- Wing area: 85.8 m^{2} (923.5 sq ft)
- Empty weight: 2,004 kg (4,418 lb)
- Gross weight: 7,804 kg (17,205 lb)

== See also ==
- Winged tank
- Baynes Bat, a British design of World War II to add glider wings to a tank
- General Aircraft Hamilcar, a military glider of the period capable of carrying light tanks
- Ilyushin Il-2, a ground-attack aircraft also nicknamed "the flying tank"
- Messerschmitt Me 321 and Junkers Ju 322, German gliders designed to be capable of carrying light armored vehicles
- The T-80, the T-84 and the Mil Mi-24 have also been nicknamed Flying Tank, the first two for their great speed for a land vehicle, the latter for its great resilience for an airborne vehicle
