= Kolesnikov-Tsybin KC-20 =

KC-20

General information
- Type: Military glider
- Designer: Dmitry Kolesnikov, Pavel Tsybin
- Primary user: USSR
- Number built: 68

History
- Manufactured: 1942-1943
- Introduction date: 1942
- First flight: 1941

The Kolesnikov-Tsybin KC-20 or KTs-20 (Russian: КЦ-20) was a Soviet light troop military glider of World War II.

== Development ==
Shortly after the German attack in 1941, Soviet headquarters realized a need for transport gliders and ordered the development of several designs. The biggest was a design of Dmitry Kolesnikov and Pavel Tsybin, although it was still a light glider.

Two prototypes were built in October 1941. It was ordered for production, under the designation KC-20 (or KTs-20) for designers' initials and the number of troopes carried. 68 were built in 1942-1943. They were produced in a wood industry works in Lopatino village near Kazan.

The KC-20 was the biggest, but least numerous of Soviet transport gliders. It could transport 20 troops or up to 2200 kg of cargo. It was quite successful, its major drawback was a lack of a big cargo hatch, therefore guns could by only carried in parts. It was initially planned to fit the glider with a back machine gun turret, hence double tailfin, but the plan was abandoned.

== Operational history ==
Like Antonov A-7 and Gribovski G-11, they were mainly used for supplying Soviet partisans with provisions, weapons, equipment and trained men, in night flights. The most intensive use was from April to November 1943 in Belarus, in the Polotsk-Begoml-Lepel area. After landing, gliders were destroyed and pilots were sometimes taken back by aircraft. They were also used to transport sabotage groups behind enemy lines. KC-20s were towed mainly by DB-3 bombers.

A less typical action was an air bridge from Moscow to the Stalingrad area in November 1942, in order to quickly deliver antifreeze cooling liquid for tanks, during the battle of Stalingrad.

== Description ==
High-wing, wooden construction glider, with a double tailfin. Slim fuselage, semi-monocoque, rectangular in cross-section. Pilot's cab in front, behind it, a transport compartment. There were double doors on both sides, and several small rectangular windows. Landing gear was manually retractable, in order to shorten landing, the glider could land on a skid under a fuselage.

== Operators ==
Soviet Union

- Soviet Air Force

== Specifications ==
Data from Fighting Gliders of World War II

General characteristics

- Crew: 2
- Capacity: 24 troops 2,000 kg (4,410 lb)
- Length: 14.12 m (46 ft 4 in)
- Wingspan: 23.8 m (78 ft 1 in)
- Height: 2.84 m (9 ft 4 in)
- Wing area: 55.2 m^{2} (594 sq ft)
- Empty weight: 2,050 kg (4,519 lb)

Performance

- Maximum glide ratio: 16:1

== See also ==
Aircraft of comparable role, configuration, and era

- Gribovski G-11
- Airspeed Horsa
- CG-4 Waco
- Slingsby Hengist
- Kokusai Ku-8

Related lists

- List of aircraft of World War II
