= Allied Aviation XLRA =

LRA
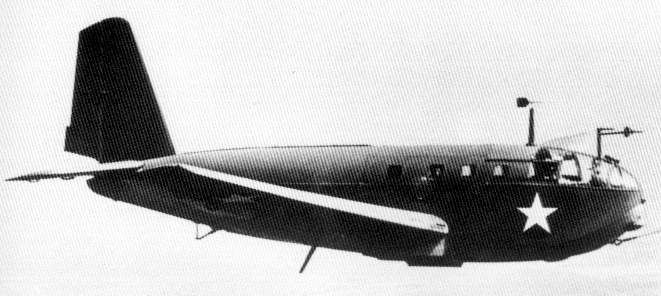
- XLRA-1

General information
- Type: Transport flying boat glider
- Manufacturer: Allied Aviation
- Primary user: U.S. Navy
- Number built: 2

History
- First flight: 1943

The Allied Aviation XLRA was a prototype flying-boat transport glider built for the US Navy during World War II. It was a low-wing wooden monoplane that could carry ten troops. Two prototypes were constructed, but orders for 100 production examples were cancelled when the Navy decided to opt for powered transport aircraft instead. The designation LR2A was assigned to a refined version of the design, but this was never produced.

== Specifications (XLRA-1) ==
General characteristics

- Crew: two pilots
- Capacity: 10 troops
- Length: 40 ft 0 in (12.2 m)
- Wingspan: 72 ft 0 in (22.0 m)
- Height: 12 ft 3 in (3.7 m)

== See also ==
Aircraft of comparable role, configuration, and era

- Bristol XLRQ
- Waco LRW

Related lists

- List of United States Navy aircraft designations (pre-1962)
- List of gliders
