= USS Outagamie County =

1945 LST-542-class tank landing ship

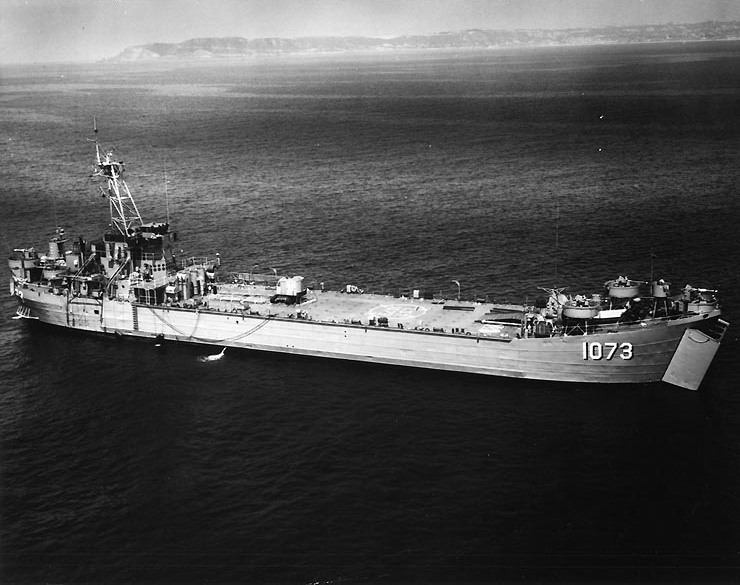
- LST-1073 offshore with her bow doors open, August 1966.

History

United States
- Name: USS LST-1073
- Builder: Bethlehem-Hingham Shipyard, Inc.; Hingham, Massachusetts
- Laid down: 20 February 1945
- Launched: 22 March 1945
- Commissioned: 17 April 1945
- Decommissioned: 5 August 1946
- Reinstated: 10 October 1950
- Recommissioned: 3 November 1950
- Renamed: USS Outagamie County (LST-1073), 1 July 1955
- Decommissioned: 21 May 1971
- Stricken: 1 December 1973
- Honors and awards: 6 battle stars, Korean War; 7 battle stars, Vietnam War
- Fate: Transferred to Brazil, 7 October 1976

History

Brazil
- Name: Garcia D'Avila (G28)
- Acquired: 7 October 1976
- Out of service: 1990

General characteristics
- Class & type: LST-542-class tank landing ship
- Displacement: 1,490 tons (light); 4,080 tons (full load of 2,100 tons)
- Length: 328 ft (100 m)
- Beam: 50 ft (15 m)
- Draft: 8 ft (2.4 m) forward; 14 ft 4 in (4.37 m) aft (full load)
- Propulsion: Two diesel engines, two shafts
- Speed: 10.8 knots (20 km/h) (max); 9 knots (17 km/h) (econ)
- Complement: 7 officers, 204 enlisted
- Armament: 8 × 40 mm guns; 12 × 20 mm guns

USS Outagamie County (LST-1073) was an LST-542-class tank landing ship in the United States Navy. Unlike many of her class, which received only numbers and were disposed of after World War II, she survived long enough to be named. On 1 July 1955, all LSTs still in commission were named for US counties or parishes; LST-1073 was given the name Outagamie County, after Outagamie County, Wisconsin.

LST-1073 was laid down on 20 February 1945 at Hingham, Massachusetts, by the Bethlehem-Hingham Shipyard, Inc.; launched on 22 March 1945; and commissioned on 17 April 1945.

== World War II Service ==
At New York City LST-1073 loaded cargo consisting of three LCMs on the main deck and mortar shells and smoke pots in the tank deck, and, on 4 June 1945, departed for islands in the Pacific by way of the Panama Canal, arriving at Pearl Harbor on 7 July. From Pearl Harbor she went to Eniwetok, Saipan, Guam, back to Saipan and then on to Nagasaki, Japan, arriving 24 September.

From September 1945 to January 1946, LST–1073 operated between various ports in Japan and the Philippines. She departed Manila on 17 January for San Francisco, stopping en route at Guam and Pearl Harbor, and arrived at San Francisco 27 February. On 5 August she decommissioned and was put into the Reserve Fleet at Astoria, Oregon.

== Korean War ==
After Communist forces invaded South Korea, LST–1073 was towed from Astoria to Bremerton, Washington, on 10 October 1950 for reactivation and recommissioned 3 November 1950.

On 11 February LST–1073 departed Long Beach, California on her second tour of duty in the western Pacific, arriving at Yokosuka, Japan, 23 March 1951. On this tour she visited various ports including Kobe and Sasebo, Japan; and Pusan, Kojo Do, and Inchon, Korea. On 4 April 1951 she transported Army Signal Corps units from Camp McGill, Japan, to Inchon, Korea. During May and June LST–1073 helped to carry 17,366 prisoners of war from Pusan to Koje Do. On 29 October LST–1073 departed from Yokosuka, Japan, for San Diego, California.

LST–1073's third tour of duty in the western Pacific began 3 January 1953 when she departed from San Diego en route to Japan. After brief stops in Yokosuka, Kobe, and Sasebo; she proceeded on to Inchon for west coast island resupply work. She took part in the Marine landing exercises at Inchon from April to June and spent June and July redeploying the 187th Regimental Airborne Combat Team and the 24th Infantry Division from Japan to Korea. In August the ship assisted in the evacuation of Cho Do Island, Korea, and in Operation Big Switch transporting North Korean POWs between various Korean ports. On 23 October the ship departed from Yokosuka, Japan, for a return voyage to San Diego.

During the next decade, the landing ship operated on the West Coast and made four West Pacific deployments. She was named Outagamie County on 1 July 1955.

== Vietnam War ==
In early 1963 she conducted oceanographic survey operations in mid-Pacific. In March 1964 Outagamie County transported troops between Oahu and training areas on Hawaii itself. During a four-month tour to Adak, Alaska, in mid 1965, the ship aided a large freighter, Liberian ship Hadjitsakas, which had run aground on a small island in the Aleutians.

In late January 1966 Outagamie County arrived at Da Nang, South Vietnam to begin nine weeks of intra-coastal logistic operations. After an upkeep period at Subic Bay, Philippine Islands, the ship returned to her coastal shuttle runs. The ship returned to San Diego 9 September. The rest of 1966 and the first half of 1967 was spent operating off the West Coast of the United States.

Outagamie County departed from San Diego 9 June 1967 and steamed via Subic Bay to Vietnam, arriving at Saigon on 26 July. For the next four months she shuttled troops and supplies between Japan, the Philippines, and Vietnam, and returned to San Diego 21 December. Operating on the West Coast until departing San Diego on 1 November 1968, the veteran landing ship returned to the war zone late in the year and supported allied operations until arriving at Guam on 18 April 1969.

From 1969 until 1971 the Outagamie County made numerous trips to Da Nang, Chu Lai, Cửa Việt Base, An Thoi and Hà Tiên. She and/or the crew received the Joint Service Commendation with 3 Oak Leaf Clusters, Combat Action Ribbon with 3 gold stars, Navy Commendation Medal, Navy Achievement Medal, Navy Presidential Unit Citation with 3 stars, Navy Unit Commendation, Navy Meritorious Unit Commendation, Navy "E" Ribbon, Vietnam Service Medal with 8 battle stars, Vietnam Campaign Medal, RVN Navy Gallantry Cross, RVN Special Service Medal, RVN Gallantry Cross with Palm, RVN Gallantry Cross Unit Citation, RVN Honor Medal, RVN Training Service Medal, RVN Presidential Unit Citation, RVN Civil Action Unit Citation, Korean Defense Service Medal, and the Armed Forces Expeditionary Medal for operation Golden Dragon in Pohang, Korea in 1970 where she sunk two North Korean boats. Also, in 1970 the Outagamie County received the Philippine Presidential Unit Citation for aiding in the volcano disaster. Several members of the crew from 1969 until 1971 received individual awards including the Bronze Star, Purple Heart, Navy Commendation Medal, Navy and Marine Corps Achievement Medal, RVN Gallantry Cross, RVN Civil Actions Medal, and RVN Armed Forces Honor Medal. The communications department received the Legion of Merit for being the support for SOPA Admin in Hong Kong. Other ports of call were Hong Kong, China, Okinawa, Osaka, and Sasebo, Japan, all the Mariana Islands (Guam chain), Yap, Carolina Islands, Subic Bay, Philippines, Midway Island, Hawaii, Miramar, and San Diego, Acapulco Mexico, Panama City Panama, and through the Panama Canal, and the final stop at Orange, Texas.

Outagamie County was decommissioned in Feb 1972 at INACT SHIP FAC in Orange, Texas and transferred to the Brazilian Navy in May 1972 where she saw service as NAel Garcia D'Avilla (G-28) along the Amazon River. The tank landing ship was struck from the US Navy List on 1 December 1972.

LST-1073 earned six battle stars for the Korean War and eight battle stars for the Vietnam War. Also, three stars for the Combat Action Ribbon during the 1969 to 1971 campaigns.

== NAeL Garcia D'Avilla ==
In December 1972, Outagamie County was sold to Brazil where she served as NAeL Garcia D'Avilla (G-28). She was taken out of service in 1990 and sold for scrapping.
