= Polikarpov VIT-2 =

Soviet twin-engine attack aircraft prototype

General information
- Type: Ground attack
- National origin: Soviet Union
- Manufacturer: Polikarpov
- Status: Cancelled
- Number built: 1

History
- First flight: 11 May 1938
- Developed from: Polikarpov VIT-1

The Polikarpov VIT-2 (Vozdooshny Istrebitel' Tahnkov—Flying Tank Destroyer) was a Soviet twin-engined ground attack aircraft developed before World War II. A single prototype was built in 1938 for evaluation purposes. Although a promising design it was recommended that it be introduced into production as a high-speed dive bomber with a reduced armament to increase its speed.

== Development ==
The VIT-2 was derived from the VIT-1 prototype, but it was given 783 kW (1,050 hp) Klimov M-105 engines and its structure was revised. It was a low-winged, twin-engined aircraft with a mixed structure. The monocoque fuselage was made in halves of 'shpon', molded birch plywood and a large fuel tank was placed between the pilot and rear gunner. The fuel tank was moved to the rear and the canopy was lengthened in consequence. The wing structure was built from a mix of steel tubes and duralumin with a duralumin skin. The empennage was redesigned as a twin tail. The main legs of the conventional landing gear retracted aft into the engine nacelles and were given fairing to reduce drag when retracted, but the tail-wheel was fixed. The nose was extensively glazed to give the bombardier/navigator good visibility and he was armed with a 20 mm (0.79 in) ShVAK cannon with 10° of vertical travel. The rear gunner/radio operator sat in a manually operated turret armed with another ShVAK and he was also provided with a retractable pair of 7.62 mm (0.300 in) ShKAS machine guns for ventral defense. Two 37 mm (1.5 in) Shpitalnyi Sh-37 cannon and two more ShVAKs were mounted in the wing roots. Up to 600 kg (1,300 lb) of bombs could be carried internally in the fuselage or a pair of 500 kg (1,100 lb) FAB-500 bombs could be carried under the wings.

The prototype was first flown on 11 May 1938 by the famous pilot Valery Chkalov and had its propellers replaced by constant speed VISh-61 propellers shortly afterwards. It was submitted for its State acceptance trials in October 1938 where it proved to be faster at sea level than the VIT-1, 486 km/h (302 mph) versus 450 km/h (280 mph), but slightly slower at altitude, 513 km/h (319 mph) at 4,500 metres (14,764 ft) compared to 530 km/h (329 mph) at 3,000 metres (9,843 ft). It was recommended for production as a high-speed dive bomber provided that some of the armament was removed to increase its speed.

== Specifications ==
Data from Gordon, Soviet Airpower in World War 2

General characteristics

- Crew: 3
- Length: 12.25 m (40 ft 2 in)
- Wingspan: 16.5 m (54 ft 2 in)
- Wing area: 40.76 m^{2} (438.7 sq ft)
- Airfoil: Clark YH
- Empty weight: 4,032 kg (8,889 lb)
- Gross weight: 6,302 kg (13,894 lb)
- Powerplant: 2 × Klimov M-105 liquid-cooled V12 engines, 783 kW (1,050 hp) each
- Propellers: 3-bladed VISh-61, 3.3 m (10 ft 10 in) diameter

Performance

- Maximum speed: 513 km/h (319 mph, 277 kn) at 4,500 metres (14,764 ft)
- Range: 800 km (500 mi, 430 nmi)
- Service ceiling: 8,200 m (26,900 ft)
  Max speed at sea level: 486 km/h (302 mph)

Armament

- Guns:
- 2 x 37 mm Sh-37 cannon
- 4x 20 mm ShVAK cannon
- 2x 7.62 mm ShKAS machine guns
- Bombs: up to a total of 1,000 kg (2,200 lb)

Aircraft of comparable role, configuration, and era

- Messerschmitt Bf 110
- Potez 630
