= TsKB-60 =

Russian military aviation program

The TsKB-60 designation, from the Tsentral'noye Konstruktorskoye Byuro (TsKB), was applied to several different Russian military aviation development engineering projects, including a developed Il-2, a twin-engined attack aircraft and a twin engined bomber.
