= Kochyerigin DI-6 =

1937 fighter aircraft by Kochyerigin

DI-6/TsKB-11
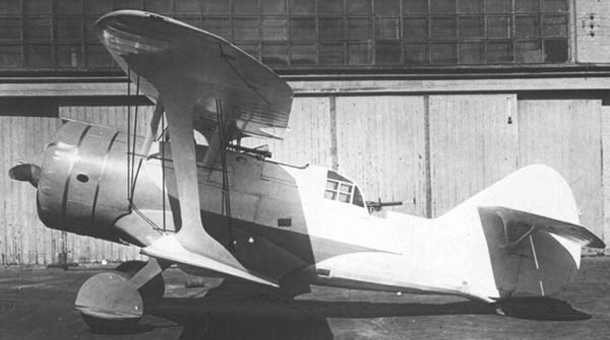
- Kochyerigin DI-6i

General information
- Type: Fighter
- National origin: Soviet Union
- Manufacturer: Factory No.39
- Designer: Sergei Aleksandrovich Kochyerigin
- Primary user: Soviet Air Force
- Number built: 222

History
- First flight: 30 September 1934

Kochyerigin DI-6 (internal designation TsKB-11; Russian: Кочеригин ДИ-6/ЦКБ-11) was a two-seat fighter biplane produced in the Soviet Union in the 1930s.

== Design and development ==
The DI-6 was a conventional single-bay biplane of mixed construction with cable-retracted main landing gear. The pilot and the tail gunner sat in tandem cockpits, the pilot's open, and the gunner's partially enclosed. To maximize the gunner's arc of fire, the rear cockpit was set lower in the fuselage than the pilot's.

The DI-6 was developed at TsKB as a fighter that would also be capable of ground attack when fitted with different armament. Originally intended to use a liquid-cooled V-12 engine, problems with its development led to the choice of the Wright R-1820 radial engine instead. The first flight took place on 30 September 1934, and testing began in earnest in early 1935, with State Acceptance Trials following between May and November. Despite a number of weaknesses discovered during testing, the type was ordered into production, and deliveries to the Soviet Air Force commenced in the spring of 1937. Problems including excessive vibration, and a poor field of fire for the gunner, were never adequately resolved, and the various fixes implemented to cure these and other problems eventually added around 160 kg (350 lb) to the aircraft's weight. Production continued until 1939.

== Operational history ==
Pre-Glasnost Western sources often reported these aircraft as having participated in the Battle of Khalkhin Gol against Japan in 1939, and even in the Winter War against Finland in 1939–1940, but more recent scholarship has failed to uncover any evidence that it was deployed in either case.

== Surviving examples ==
A replica DI-6 is displayed in Victory Park, at the Museum of the Great Patriotic War in Moscow.

== Variants ==
DI-6bis
Trainer with fixed landing gear.
DI-6Sh (TsKB-11Sh, TsKB-38)
Ground attack variant with armored pilot's seat and four forward-firing PV-1 machine guns under the bottom wing; 60 built.
DI-6MMSh
One prototype with M-300 X engine, did not enter production.

== Operators ==
Soviet Union

- Soviet Air Force

== Specifications (DI-6) ==
Data from Shavrov 1985

General characteristics

- Crew: 2
- Length: 6.87 m (22 ft 6 in)
- Wingspan: 9.94 m (32 ft 7 in)
- Height: 3.2 m (10 ft 6 in)
- Wing area: 25.15 m^{2} (270.7 sq ft)
- Empty weight: 1,360 kg (2,998 lb)
- Gross weight: 1,955 kg (4,310 lb)
- Powerplant: 1 × Shvetsov M-25 9-cylinder air-cooled radial piston engine, 522 kW (700 hp)
- Propellers: 2-bladed variable-pitch propeller

Performance

- Maximum speed: 372 km/h (231 mph, 201 kn)
- Range: 500 km (310 mi, 270 nmi)
- Service ceiling: 7,700 m (25,300 ft)
- Time to altitude: 5,000 m (16,000 ft) in 10 minutes
- Wing loading: 78 kg/m^{2} (16 lb/sq ft)
- Power/mass: 0.27 kW/kg (0.16 hp/lb)
- Horizontal turn time: 12 seconds

Armament

- Guns: 3× 7.62 mm (0.3 in) ShKAS machine guns, two unsynchronized firing forward and one on a rear-facing mount, 750 rounds/gun
- Bombs: Up to 40 kg (88 lb) of bombs
