= Oleg Antonov (aircraft designer) =

Soviet aeroplane designer (1906–1984)

- Олег Антонов
- Antonov in the 1970s
- Born: 7 February 1906; Troitsy, Russia
- Died: 4 April 1984 (aged 78); Kiev, Ukrainian SSR, Soviet Union
- Education: Leningrad Polytechnic Institute (1930)
- Occupations: scientist; engineer; aircraft pilot
- Years active: 1924–1984
- Known for: Antonov aircraft designer
- Title: Doctor of Science; Professor
- Spouse: Elizaveta Shahkhatuni
- Children: 4
- Awards: Hero of Socialist Labour (1966); Stalin Prize (1952); Lenin Prize (1962)

Signature
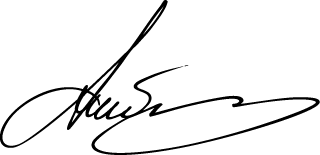

Oleg Konstantinovich Antonov (Note: Russian: Олег Константинович Антонов; Ukrainian: Олег Костянтинович Антонов, romanized: Oleh Kostiantynovych Antonov.) (7 February 1906 – 4 April 1984) was a Russian and Soviet aeroplane designer. He founded the Research and Design Bureau No. 153 (OKB-153) in Novosibirsk, which was moved to Ukraine in 1952 and is now called Antonov in his honor. Antonov designed a number of Soviet aeroplanes (such as the Antonov An-2, Antonov An-12) and numerous gliders for both civilian and military use.

== Early life ==
Antonov was born on 7 February 1906 in Troitsy, Moscow Governorate, Russian Empire (now Podolsky District of the Moscow Oblast), to a family of Russian ethnicity. In 1912, the Antonovs moved to Saratov, where he attended the non-classical secondary school (now gymnasium №1) and secondary school (now school №23). From an early age, Antonov was fascinated with aviation and spent much of his spare time at the local airfield.

== Early engineering career ==
At the age of 13, Antonov together with friends founded the "Aviation Enthusiasts Club" (Russian: «Клуб любителей авиации») and later joined the "Organization of Friends of the Air Force". Later he designed the OKA-1 "Pigeon", a glider that was entered in a competition in Moscow where he won the first prize, a flight on a Junkers 12 aircraft.

In 1930, Antonov graduated from the Kalinin Polytechnical Institute in Leningrad. He continued to design gliders and in 1931 Antonov became the chief designer at the Moscow Glider Factory. During the next eight years, he designed 30 different gliders including the Standard-1, Standard-2, OKA-6 and the large "City of Lenin" glider. Due to a requirement that all pilots in the Soviet Union had to begin their flight training in gliders, Antonov was able to produce up to 8,000 gliders per year.

In 1938, after an incident when an instructor defected to the West using a glider, the Soviet government reversed its decision regarding glider training, banned the sport of gliding and shut down the Moscow Glider Factory.

== Professional designer career and World War II ==
Following the closure of the glider factory in 1938, he unsuccessfully applied to enter Zhukovsky Air Academy the same year. He then in 1940 joined Yakovlev's Sportsplane Factory and there, after receiving two aircraft from Germany in June 1940, he was assigned to prepare the German Fi 156 Storch for production in Kaunas. He was also tasked with designing an ambulance version of the aircraft.

Antonov was appointed chief designer for the Yakovlev Design Bureau. In 1940 a new aircraft design bureau under his own management was established in Leningrad. The German invasion resulted in the closure of the plant and he was reassigned to work on the A-7 glider. The factory was later reorganised to produce A-7s.

During World War II, the A-7 was used for airbridge supply of the Soviet partisans behind the front lines. Antonov also worked on the Antonov A-40 biplane glider that was designed to airlift tanks, but this project proved unsuccessful. In total during the war around 450 A-7s were produced. In 1943, Antonov returned to the Yakovlev design bureau to fill a vacancy as Yakovlev's first deputy designer. He was put in charge of Yak-3 and also of production at Novosibirsk. Much of his time and energy was devoted to the improvement of the Yak series, one of the most mass-produced fighter aircraft types of World War II.

== Postwar career and establishment of the Antonov Design Bureau ==
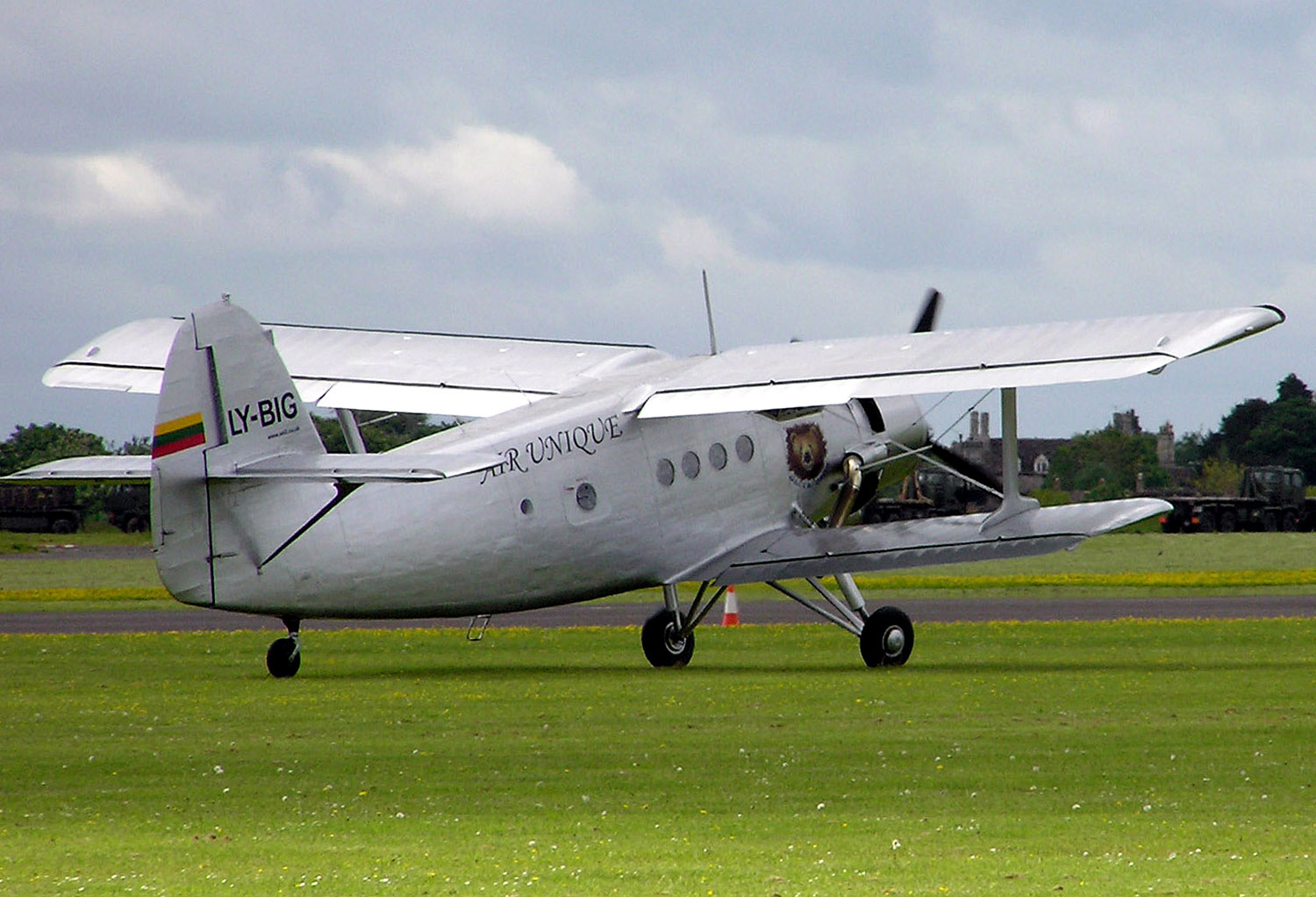
Antonov An-2

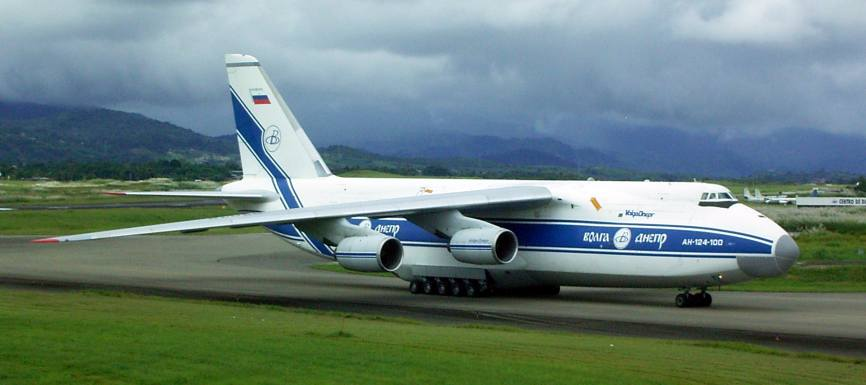
An-124-100 Ruslan civil certificated version of the strategic airlifter

After the war, Antonov requested that Yakovlev let him work independently, heading Yakovlev's subsidiary design office at the aircraft manufacturing factory at Novosibirsk. On 31 May 1946, Antonov was appointed head of the newly redesignated facility (subsequently known as the Antonov Research and Design Bureau), which was later moved to Kiev, Ukrainian SSR. In September 1946, Antonov, in addition to his management of the design bureau, became the director of the Siberian R&D Institute for Aeronautics.

The first of the Antonov Bureau's designs was the SKh-1 (Sel′sko Khozyaystvennyi- pervoy - agricultural-first one) agricultural aircraft, later redesignated An-2, designed to meet a 1947 Soviet requirement for a replacement for the Polikarpov Po-2 which was used in large numbers as both an agricultural aircraft and a utility aircraft. Antonov designed a large single-bay biplane of all-metal construction, with an enclosed cockpit and a cabin accommodating 12 passengers.

A series of significant transports followed under Oleg Antonov's direction. Antonov aircraft (design office prefix An-) range from a rugged An-2 (which itself is comparatively large for a biplane) through the An-28 reconnaissance aircraft to the massive An-124 Ruslan strategic airlifter. The quad-turboprop An-12 and its derivatives became the primary Soviet military transport from 1959 onward. While less well known, the An-24, An-26, An-30 and An-32 family of twin-turboprop, high winged, passenger/cargo/troops aircraft predominate in domestic/short-haul air services in the former Soviet Union and parts of the world formerly under Soviet influence. Antonov also oversaw development of the mid-range An-72/An-74 jet airplanes family. The world's largest production aircraft, the An-124 Ruslan, flew for the first time in 1982, and its specialised shuttle-carrying/extra-heavy cargo derivative, the An-225 Mriya entered development, still under Antonov's guidance, but did not make its maiden flight until 1989 after his death. In November 2004, FAI placed the An-225 in the Guinness Book of Records for its 240 records. Some of Antonov's designs are also built abroad, such as the Shaanxi Y-8.

In 1965 Antonov signed a petition in defense of Soviet dissident Ivan Dziuba.

== Family ==
Antonov was married three times (to Elena Kochetkova, Yelyzaveta Shahatuni, and Elvira Antonova) and was the father of four children (Rolan, Anna, Elena, and Andrei).

== Death ==
Oleg Antonov died 4 April 1984 in Kiev, Ukrainian SSR, and was buried in Baikove Cemetery.

== Honorary titles, awards and legacy ==
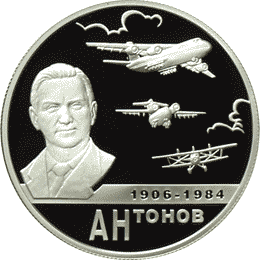
Russian 2006 commemorative coin featuring Antonov's portrait and aircraft

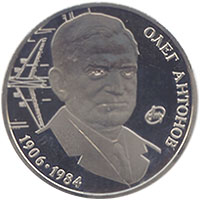
Ukrainian 2006 commemorative coin featuring Antonov's portrait and aircraft

During his lifetime, Antonov was recognized as a Doctor of Science, Academician of the Academy of Science of the Ukrainian SSR (1968), Hero of Socialist Labor (1966), and elected member of the Supreme Soviet of the USSR of the 5th, 6th and 7th convocations.

Among numerous awards, Antonov received the State Award of the USSR in 1952 and Lenin Award in 1962.

Antonov was decorated with three Orders of Lenin, the Order of the October Revolution, the Order of the Patriotic War 1st class, the Order of the Red Banner of Labour and the Medal "Partisan of the Patriotic War" 1st class.

A street in Kyiv's Solomyanka neighborhood is named after Oleg Antonov.

In 1999, Antonov was inducted into the International Air & Space Hall of Fame at the San Diego Air & Space Museum.

A coin was minted of copper nickel alloy in 2006 by the National Bank of Ukraine honoring Antonov. In addition, a silver proof coin was issued by the Bank of Russia to commemorate 100 years since Antonov's birth.
