= Polikarpov I-17 =

1930s fighter aircraft model by Polikarpov

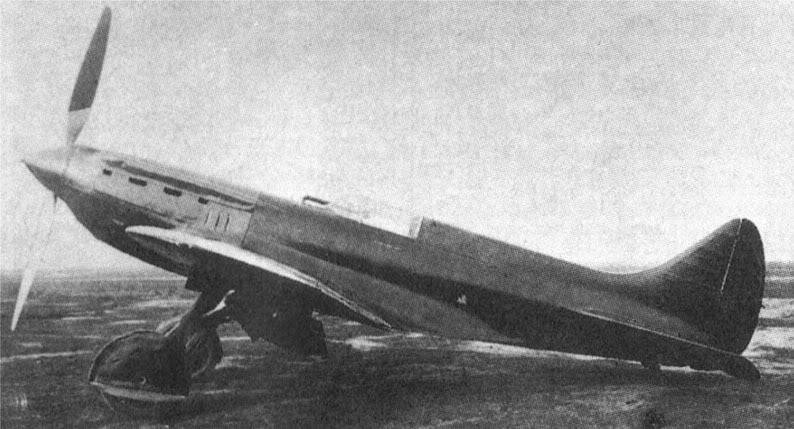

General information
- Type: Single-seat fighter
- National origin: Soviet Union
- Manufacturer: Polikarpov
- Number built: 3

History
- First flight: 1 September 1934

The Polikarpov I-17 was a Soviet single-seat fighter prototype designed and built by a team headed by Nikolai Polikarpov at the Central Design Bureau (TsKB) in 1934.

== Development ==
The I-17 was a lightweight single-seat low-wing cantilever monoplane. Developed under the design bureau designation TsKB-15 it first flew on 1 September 1934 powered by a 567 kW (760 hp) Hispano-Suiza 12 Ybrs engine. The second prototype designated the TsKB-19 had a revised inward retracting wide-track main landing gear and a Soviet M-100 engine. This second prototype was displayed at the 1936 Salon de l'Aeronautique in Paris. The third prototype designated the TsKB-33 had reduced armament to save weight and a revised engine cooling system, but the further development was abandoned in 1936.

A number of related unbuilt projects were also under development including the I-17Z parasite fighter under the designations TsKB-25 with a M-34RNF engine and the TsKB-43 with a Hispano-Suiza engine, none were built.

== Variants ==
TsKB-15
First prototype I-17 powered by a 567 kW (760 hp) Hispano-Suiza 12 Ybrs engine.
TsKB-19
Second revised I-17 prototype powered by a M-100 engine.
TsKB-25
Unbuilt I-17Z project for a Mikulin AM-34RNF powered parasite fighter.
TsKB-33
Third revised I-17 prototype with reduced armament.
TsKB-43
Unbuilt project with a Hispano-Suiza engine.

== Surviving aircraft ==
One I-17 prototype is on display at the V. P. Chkalov Memorial Museum in Chkalovsk, Russia.

== Specifications (TsKB-19) ==
General characteristics

- Crew: 1 (pilot)
- Length: 7.30 m (23 ft 11 in)
- Wingspan: 10.19 m (33 ft 5 in)
- Height: 2.56 m (8 ft 5 in)
- Gross weight: 1,930 kg (4,250 lb)
- Powerplant: 1 × Klimov M-100 engine , 632 kW (860 hp)

Performance

- Maximum speed: 490 km/h (305 mph, 265 kn)
- Range: 800 km (497 mi, 432 nmi)
- Service ceiling: 11,000 m (36,090 ft)

Armament

- 1 x 20mm ShVAK cannon
- 4 x 7.62mm ShKAS machine guns
- 2 x 100kg bombs under the wings
