= Antonov A-7 =

Soviet light troop glider of WWII

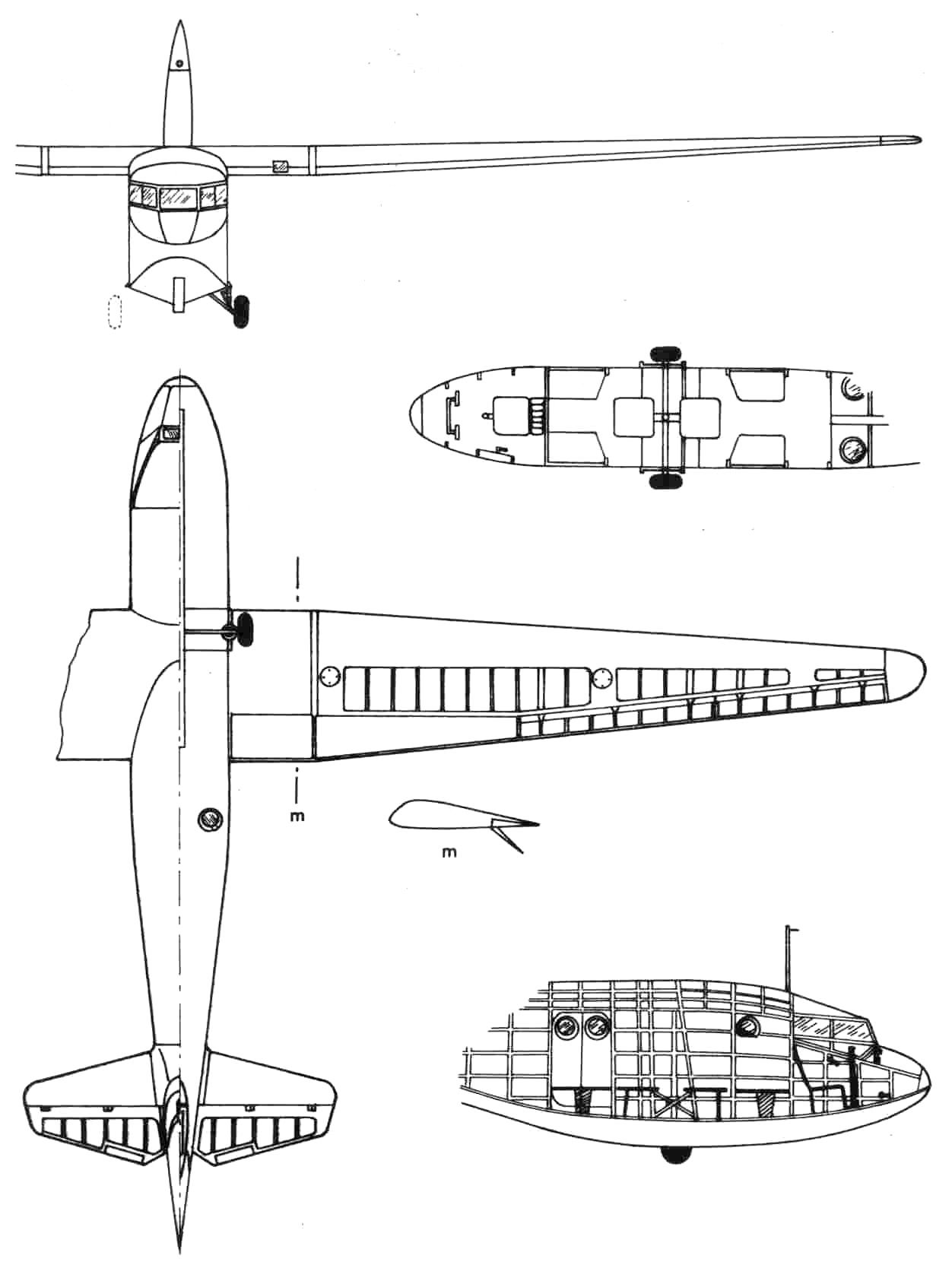

General information
- Type: Military glider
- Designer: Oleg Antonov
- Primary user: USSR
- Number built: ≈400

History
- Manufactured: 1942–1945
- Introduction date: 1942
- First flight: 1941

The Antonov A-7 was a Soviet light troop military glider of World War II.

== Development ==
Shortly after the German attack in 1941, Soviet headquarters realized a need for transport gliders and ordered the development of several designs. Oleg Antonov offered a light glider, of which preliminary sketches had been drawn in 1939. It was first named RF-8 (Rot Front-8) and was essentially an enlarged variant of a sports glider, the RF-7. Following trials, its capacity was increased from five to seven persons (including pilot).

The A-7 was an all-wooden high-wing monoplane, with a retractable undercarriage.

It was evaluated in late 1941 and ordered for production, under the designation A-7 (Antonov, seven persons). Approximately 400 were built. In late 1942 – early 1943, an unusual variant was tested – a tanker glider, fitted with a 1000-litre fuel tank, hauled by a DB-3 bomber which was refuelled during flight in order to increase range. It was not produced.

== Operational history ==
The A-7, along with the Gribovsky G-11, constituted the majority of Soviet transport gliders. They were mainly used for supplying Soviet partisans with provisions, weapons, equipment and trained men. The most intensive use was from April to November 1943 in Belarus, in the Polotsk-Begoml-Lepel area. Several hundreds of Soviet gliders (of all types) were used in night supply flights at this time. After landing, gliders were destroyed and pilots were sometimes taken back by aircraft. Gliders were also used to supply partisans in some areas in 1944. They were also used to transport sabotage groups behind enemy lines, though the small capacity of the A-7 made it not very suitable for such actions. A-7s were towed mainly by SB or Ilyushin DB-3 bombers (The DB-3 could tow two A-7s).

A less typical action was an air bridge from Moscow to the Stalingrad area in November 1942, in order to quickly deliver antifreeze cooling liquid for tanks, during the battle of Stalingrad.

The A-7 was considered a successful design, but it had less capacity than the other light glider, the G-11. Moreover, a place for cargo was limited by an arrangement of seats and a presence of cantilevers of a retractable landing gear in the center of a transport compartment. It could transport seven troops (including pilot) or up to 900 kg of cargo.

== Description ==
High-wing, mixed construction (mostly wooden). Fuselage semi-monocoque, rectangular in cross-section. Single-seat pilot's cab in front. Behind it, a transport compartment, with six seats: two on sides in front (opposite each other), two on sides in back, and two in the middle (facing front and back). There were double doors in the left side in front, and on the right side in back (left front and right back seats must be raised prior to opening door). There were small round windows in doors and sides opposite to doors. Wings were three-part, plywood and fabric covered. Landing gear was manually retractable, its cantilevers were in a transport compartment between two central seats. In order to shorten landing, the glider could alight on a skid under the fuselage.

== Operators ==
Soviet Union

- Soviet Air Force

== Specifications ==
Data from Fighting gliders of World War II, Aircraft of the Soviet Union : the encyclopaedia of Soviet aircraft since 1917

General characteristics

- Crew: 2
- Capacity: 8 equipped troops / 910 kg (2,000 lb) cargo
- Length: 11.5 m (37.7 ft)
- Wingspan: 19.0 m (62.2 ft)
- Wing area: 31.1 m^{2} (335 sq ft)
- Empty weight: 955 kg (2,105 lb)
- Gross weight: 1,760 kg (3,880 lb)
- Max takeoff weight: 1,875 kg (4,134 lb)

Performance

- Never exceed speed: 400 km/h (250 mph, 220 kn)
- Lift-to-drag: 18:1 (some sources 22.5:1)

== See also ==
Aircraft of comparable role, configuration, and era

- DFS 230
- General Aircraft Hotspur
- Gribovsky G-11
- Maeda Ku-1
- Waco CG-3

Related lists

- List of aircraft of World War II
