= Military glider =

Gliders used by the militaries of various countries

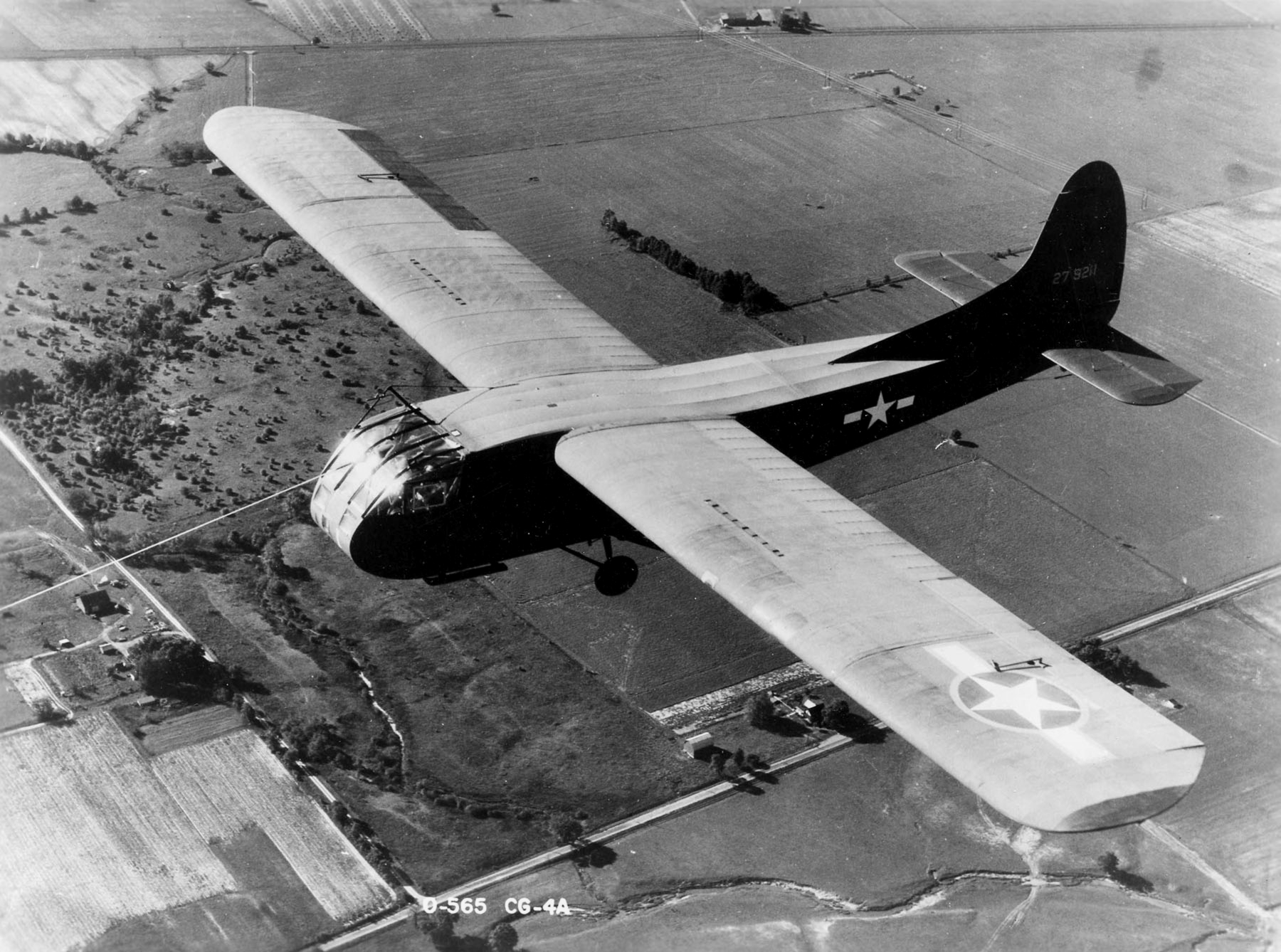
A Waco CG-4A of the USAAF

Military gliders (an offshoot of common gliders) have been used by the militaries of various countries for carrying troops (glider infantry) and heavy equipment to a combat zone, mainly during the Second World War. These engineless aircraft were towed into the air and most of the way to their target by military transport planes, e.g., C-47 Skytrain or Dakota, or bombers relegated to secondary activities, e.g., Short Stirling. Most military gliders do not soar, although there were attempts to build military sailplanes as well, such as the DFS 228.

Once released from the tow craft near the front, they were to land on any convenient open terrain close to the target, hopefully with as little damage to the cargo and crew as possible, as most landing zones (LZ) were far from ideal. The one-way nature of the missions meant that they were treated as semi-expendable, leading to construction from common and inexpensive materials such as wood. Most nations seriously attempted to recover as many as possible, to reuse them, so they were not originally intended to be disposable, although resource-rich nations like the US sometimes used them as if they were, since it was easier than recovering them.

Troops landing by glider were referred to as air-landing as opposed to paratroops. Landing by parachute caused the troops to be spread over a large drop zone and separated from other airdropped equipment, such as vehicles and anti-tank guns. Gliders, on the other hand, could land troops and ancillaries in greater concentrations precisely at the target landing area. Furthermore, the glider, once released at some distance from the actual target, was effectively silent and difficult for the enemy to identify. Larger gliders were developed to land heavy equipment like anti-tank guns, anti-aircraft guns, small vehicles, such as jeeps, and also light tanks (e.g., the Tetrarch tank). This heavier equipment made otherwise lightly armed paratroop forces a much more capable force. The Soviets also experimented with ways to deliver light tanks by air, including the Antonov A-40, a gliding tank with detachable wings.

By the time of the Korean War, helicopters had largely replaced gliders. Helicopters have the advantage of being able to extract soldiers, in addition to delivering them to the battlefield with more precision. Also, advances in powered transport aircraft had been made, to the extent that even light tanks could be dropped by parachute. And after the widespread use of radar in the military, silence in the air is no longer sufficient for concealment.

== Development ==
The development of modern gliders was spurred by the Versailles Treaty following World War I, under the terms of which Germany was prohibited from constructing certain high-powered airplanes. As a result, German aircraft designers turned their attention toward the practical development of unpowered aircraft, with a pilot remaining in the air in a glider for more than 20 minutes and a national glider competition emerging by 1922.

The early sporting objectives of gliders were quickly overtaken in the Soviet Union and in Germany by military applications, mainly the training of pilots. By 1934, the Soviet Union had ten gliding schools and 57,000 glider pilots had gained licences.

In 1932, the Soviet Union demonstrated the TsK Komsula, a four-place glider designed by GF Groschev that could also be used for cargo. Larger gliders were then developed, culminating in an 18-seater at the military institute in Leningrad in 1935. Luftwaffe Colonel Kurt Student visited Moscow as part of the military collaboration programme with the Soviet Union. He reported back to his superiors in Berlin details of a 1,500-man parachute drop and the large transport gliders that he had seen. The Luftwaffe opened a parachute school as a result in 1937. Further field testing convinced Student that a vehicle was needed to deliver the heavy weapons for the lightly armed parachute troops. This idea was dismissed until October 1938, by which time Student had risen to major-general and was appointed Inspector of Airborne Forces. Development of a troop-carrying glider was assigned to Hans Jacobs of the Deutsche Forschungsanstalt für Segelflug to develop the DFS 230 which could carry 9–10 fully equipped troops or 1,200 kg (2,800 pounds).

== German military glider ==
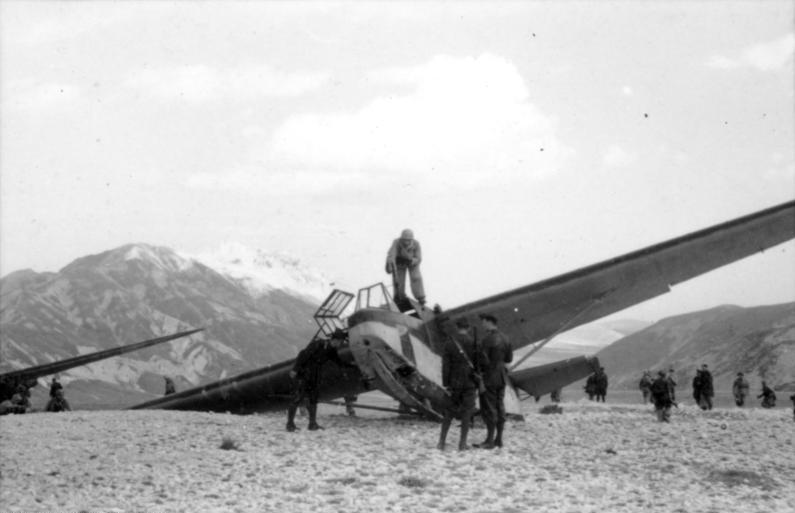
A German DFS 230 after it landed troops during the Gran Sasso raid, September 12, 1943

The Germans were the first to use gliders in warfare, most famously during the assault of the Eben Emael fortress and the capture of the bridges over the Albert Canal at Veldwezelt, Vroenhoven and Kanne on May 10, 1940, in which 41 DFS 230 gliders carrying 10 soldiers each were launched behind Junkers Ju 52s. Ten gliders landed on the grassed roof of the fortress. Only twenty minutes after landing the force had neutralized the fortress at a cost of six dead and twenty wounded. Hitler was anxious to gain maximum publicity and so several foreign attachés were given guided tours of the fortress. Consequently, the British, American and Japanese became quickly aware of the methods that had been used. By mid-1940, both Japan and Britain had active glider programs.

Development then began of even larger gliders such as the Gotha Go 242 (23 trooper) and Messerschmitt Me 321 (130 trooper) to transport heavy armaments in anticipation of Operation Sea Lion and Operation Barbarossa.

Gliders were also used by Germany in Greece in 1941. On April 26, 1941, the troops from six DFS 230 gliders captured the bridge over the Corinth Canal accompanied by 40 plane-loads of German paratroopers. (Fortuitously, the British were able to demolish the bridge a few hours later.) Next, General Student then convinced Hitler that Crete could be captured using only airborne troops. Consequently, on May 20, 1941, 500 German transport aircraft carrying paratroopers and 74 DFS 230 gliders took off from the Greek mainland. During the capture of the island, 5,140 German airborne troops were either killed or wounded out of the 13,000 sent. Among the 350 German planes destroyed in the operation, half had been Ju 52s, which seriously depleted the force needed for the invasion of the Soviet Union shortly after. As a result, Hitler vowed never to use his airborne force in such large numbers again.

Some German glider operations continued later in the war, some examples being the rescue operation of Benito Mussolini at Gran Sasso and emergency re-supply operations in Russia, North Africa and Eastern Europe towards the end of the war. The Junkers Ju 322 Mammut ("Mammoth") was the largest such glider ever built, but it was never used operationally. Not all military gliders were planned for transport. The Blohm & Voss BV 40 was a German glider fighter designed to attack Allied bomber formations but was not used.

== British military gliders ==
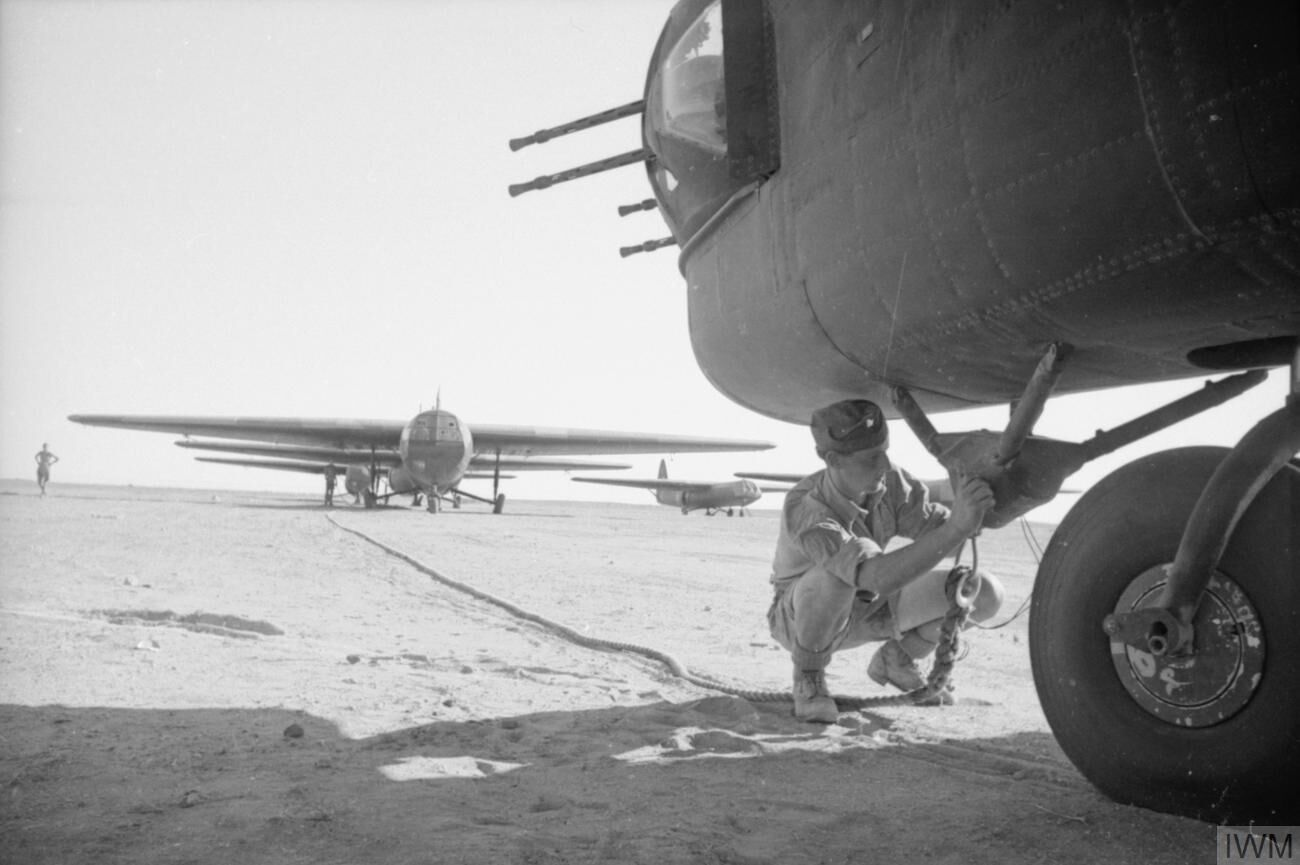
An RAF airman attaches the tow rope of an Airspeed Horsa glider to the tow hook of a Handley Page Halifax glider tug, in preparation for Operation Fustian, Tunisia (July 1943)

The British glider development started in mid-1940, prompted by the assault on Eben Emael. Among the types developed were the 28 trooper Airspeed Horsa and the 7-ton capacity General Aircraft Hamilcar cargo glider. The Hamilcar could carry vehicles, anti-tank guns and light tanks into action. The General Aircraft Hotspur – originally planned as a compact assault glider carrying a small number of troops – was used for training the British Army pilots who formed the Glider Pilot Regiment. The Slingsby Hengist was a backup design which was not required when the similar capacity American-built Waco CG-4 (given the British service name "Hadrian") became available in large numbers through lend-lease. Four hundred of the 3,600 Horsas built were supplied to the USAAF.

The most famous British actions using gliders included the unsuccessful Operation Freshman, against a German heavy water plant in Norway in 1942; and the capture of the Caen canal and Orne river bridges in a coup-de-main operation at the very start of the invasion of Normandy. Other glider actions included Operation Dragoon (the invasion of southern France), Operation Market Garden (the landing at Arnhem Bridge to try and seize a bridgehead over the lower Rhine) and Operation Varsity (crossing of the Rhine). Out of the 2,596 gliders dispatched for Operation Market Garden, 2,239 were effective in delivering men and equipment to their designated landing zones.

Although gliders are still used in the Royal Air Force in the Royal Air Force Gliding & Soaring Association and for cadet training by the Air Training Corps, they are not used in combat operations. No troop-carrying gliders have been in British service since 1957.

== American military gliders ==
=== United States Army, Army Air Forces, and Air Force ===
Major General Henry "Hap" Arnold, Acting Deputy Chief of Staff for Air (becoming Commanding General of the United States Army Air Forces on March 9, 1942), initiated a study with view to develop a glider capable of being towed by aircraft. This directive was set into motion through Classified Technical Instructions (CTI-198 on 24 February 1941, and CTI-203 on 4 March 1941), which authorized the procurement of 2-, 8-, and 15-place gliders and equipment. Eleven companies were invited to participate in the experimental glider program, but only four responded with any interest, Frankfort Sailplane Company (XCG-1, XCG-2), Waco Aircraft Company (XCG-3, XCG-4), St. Louis Aircraft Corp. (XCG-5, XCG-6), and Bowlus Sailplanes (XCG-7, XCG-8). Only Waco Aircraft Company was able to deliver the experimental glider prototypes that satisfied the requirements of Materiel Command, the eight-seat Waco CG-3 (modified to become a production nine-seat glider) and the fifteen-seat Waco CG-4. In October 1941, Lewin B. Barringer was made Glider Specialist, Air Staff, HQ of the Army Air Forces, answering to General Arnold, and placed in charge of the glider program. The shock of the Japanese attack on Pearl Harbor on 7 December 1941 prompted the United States to set the number of glider pilots needed at 1,000 to fly 500 eight-seat gliders and 500 fifteen-seat gliders. The number of pilots required was increased to 6,000 by June 1942. After Barringer was lost at sea on a flight to Africa in January 1943, the program came under direction of Richard C. du Pont. Bigger gliders, such as the 30-troop Waco CG-13A and the 42-troop Laister-Kauffman CG-10A were designed later.

A U.S. Army film describing the use of military gliders during Operation Market

The most widely used type was the Waco CG-4A, which was first used in the invasion of Sicily in July 1943 and participated in the D-Day assault on France on 6 June 1944, and in other important airborne operations in Europe, including Operation Market Garden in September 1944 and the crossing the Rhine in March 1945, and in the China-Burma-India Theater. The CG-4A was constructed of a metal and wood frame covered with fabric, manned by a crew of two and with an allowable normal cargo load of 3,710 lb, allowing it to carry 13 combat-equipped troops or a jeep or small artillery piece. The CG-10 could hold 10,850 lb of cargo, such as two howitzers, at a time. The final glider mission of the war was at Luzon on 23 June 1945. By the end of the war, the United States had built 14,612 gliders of all types and had trained over 6,000 glider pilots. The designs of the Waco Aircraft Company were also produced by a wide variety of manufacturers including Ford Motor Company and Cessna Aircraft Company as well as furniture, piano and coffin manufacturers.

Following World War II, the United States maintained only one regiment of gliders. Gliders were used in military exercises in 1949, but glider operations were deleted from the United States Army's capabilities on 1 January 1953. However, the United States Air Force continues to use sailplanes at the United States Air Force Academy to train cadets in the fundamentals of flight.

=== United States Navy and Marine Corps ===
In April 1941, United States Navy officer Marc Mitscher proposed that the Navy develop amphibious gliders with flying-boat hulls with a goal of deploying an amphibious glider force capable of delivering an entire United States Marine Corps brigade of 715 men to a hostile beachhead, the gliders to be towed by Consolidated PBY-5A Catalina amphibian aircraft. The Navy's Bureau of Aeronautics developed specifications for two types of amphibious glider, a single-hulled type which could carry 12 passengers and a twin-hulled type that could carry 24 passengers. Two companies, the Allied Aviation Corporation and the Bristol Aeronautical Corporation, received contracts to produce 100 gliders, and plans called for the procurement of 12,000 more amphibious gliders if the concept proved successful.

No twin-hulled glider was built, but each company constructed the prototype of a single-hulled amphibious glider, the XLRA-1 by Allied Aviation and the XLRQ-1 by Bristol Aeronautical. The two prototypes made their first flights in early 1943, but by the time they did the Navy and Marine Corps already had concluded that the use of gliders to deliver Marines to beachheads was impractical. No further examples of the two glider types were built, and the Navy officially terminated the amphibious glider program on 27 September 1943. Testing of the two prototypes continued until early December 1943, apparently in connection with the development of a glider bomb.

The Marine Corps established a glider training unit in early 1942 at Marine Corps Recruit Depot Parris Island, South Carolina, using non-amphibious Pratt-Read LNE-1 and Schweizer LNS-1 gliders. In addition, the Navy took delivery during World War II of 15 U.S. Army Air Forces Waco CG-4A non-amphibious gliders for evaluation under the Navy designation LRW-1. Neither of these initiatives resulted in operational use of gliders by the U.S. Navy or Marine Corps.

== Soviet military gliders ==
The Soviet Union built the world's first military gliders starting in 1932, including the 16-seat Grokhovski G63, though no glider was built in quantity until World War II. During the war, there were only two light gliders built in series: Antonov A-7 and Gribovski G-11 – about 1,000 altogether. A medium glider, the KC-20, was built in a small series. They were used mostly for providing partisans in Belarus with supplies and armament in 1942–1943. On 21 September 1943, 35 gliders were used in the Dnepr crossing. Later, other types of gliders were built: the Cybin C-25 (25 trooper) in 1944, the Yakovlev Yak-14 (35 trooper) in 1948, and the Ilyushin Il-32 (60 trooper) also in 1948. In 1950, a Yak-14 became the first glider to fly over the North Pole.

The Soviet Union maintained three glider infantry regiments until 1965. However, Soviet Air Force transport gliders were gradually withdrawn from service with the arrival of turboprop transports like the Antonov An-12 and Antonov An-24, which entered service in the late 1950s.

== See also ==
- Army Flying Museum
- Glider Pilot Regiment
- Glider snatch pick-up
- List of gliders
- List of World War II military gliders
- Oleg Antonov, a prominent Soviet aircraft designer who started his career with military gliders projects
- Silent Wings Museum
- Barbara Cartland
- Glider Badge
