= Gribovsky G-11 =

G-11 (Г-11)
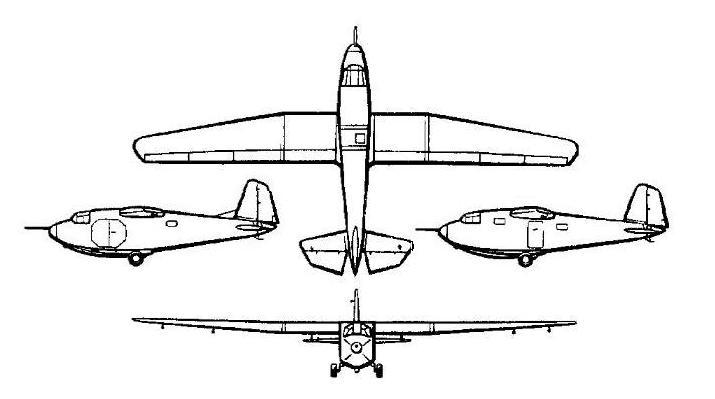

General information
- Type: Military glider
- Designer: Vladimir Gribovsky
- Primary user: USSR
- Number built: 500-600

History
- Manufactured: 1941-1948
- Introduction date: 1941
- First flight: 1 September 1941

The Gribovsky G-11 (Russian: Грибовский Г-11) was a Soviet light troop/cargo military glider of World War II.

== Development ==
The Soviet Union was the world's pioneer in designing transport gliders - the first design, the Grokhovski G-63, was built in 1932, however, no transport gliders were produced in series before World War II.

Shortly after the German attack in 1941, the Soviet headquarters realized a need for transport gliders and ordered the development of several designs. Vladimir Gribovski agreed to design a light glider in two months and the tests of a prototype started on 1 September 1941. Given the Gribovsky designation G-29, it was accepted for production under the VVS designation G-11 (for Gribovski, 11-men including pilot).

G-11s were produced from late 1941 until mid-1942 in two factories: 138 were built in Shumerlya (factory no. 471) and 170 in Kozlovka village (factory no. 494), for a total of 308. Production restarted in 1944 at Ryazan remaining in production until 1948. From October 1944 the G-11U training glider with twin controls was also in production. There are no data for a total production number, but it is estimated that 500-600 were eventually completed.

A powered version designated G-11M by the VVS (Gribovsky designation G-30) had a M-11 radial engine mounted above the fuselage. It was tested from the Summer of 1942 but did not enter production.

== Design ==
The G-11 was a high-wing, all-wooden construction, plywood-covered transport glider. The fuselage was rectangular in cross-section with a single-seat cockpit in the nose, accessed by an upward opening canopy. Behind the cockpit was the 3.24 m × 1.25 m × 1.36 m (10.6 ft × 4.1 ft × 4.5 ft) cargo hold / passenger cabin. There were two 1.2 m × 0.7 m (3.9 ft × 2.3 ft) doors on opposite fuselage sides. Later series had only one 1.4 m × 0.7 m (4.6 ft × 2.3 ft) hatch on the left side. Troops sat on folding benches along the sides, lit by two small rectangular windows on each side. Wings were three-part, fitted with flaps for landing and the landing gear was fixed, but could be folded by the pilot in order to shorten the landing, using the main fuselage skid for landing.

== Operational history ==
G-11s, along with the Antonov A-7 constituted a majority of Soviet transport gliders. They were mainly used from mid-1942 for supplying Soviet partisans with provisions, weapons, equipment and trained men, towed mainly by SB or DB-3 bombers. Most intensive use was from March to November 1943 in Belarus, in the Polotsk-Begoml-Lepel area, on the Kalinin Front. Several hundred Soviet gliders (of all types) were used in night supply flights there. After landing, the gliders were destroyed and pilots were sometimes returned by aircraft. The only known instance of a glider returning from the field occurred in April 1943, when a famous glider and test pilot Sergei Anokhin evacuated two wounded partisan commanders in a G-11, towed by a Tupolev SB bomber, piloted by Yuriy Zhelutov, on a 10 m (33 ft) short towrope.

Gliders were also used to supply partisans in some areas in 1944 and to transport sabotage groups behind enemy lines. G-11 gliders were also used in at least one small-scale airborne operation, the Dnepr crossing, carrying anti-tank guns and mortars.

A less typical action was an airbridge from Moscow to the Stalingrad area in November 1942, to rapidly deliver anti-freeze coolant for tanks, during the battle of Stalingrad.

The G-11 enjoyed relative success as a light transport glider design, having more capacity than the Antonov A-7, and its transport compartment was a better fit for cargo, although light guns could only be carried in parts due to small hatches.

== Operators ==
Soviet Union

- Soviet Air Force

== Specifications ==
Data from

General characteristics

- Crew: 1
- Capacity: 10 troops or cargo / 1,200 kg (2,646 lb)
- Length: 9.8 m (32 ft 2 in)
- Wingspan: 18 m (59 ft 1 in)
- Height: 2.7 m (8 ft 10 in)
- Wing area: 30 m^{2} (320 sq ft)
- Empty weight: 1,200 kg (2,646 lb)
- Gross weight: 2,400 kg (5,291 lb)

Performance

- Never exceed speed: 280 km/h (170 mph, 150 kn) (aerotow)
- Aerotow speed: 146 km/h (91 mph; 79 kn)
- Rate of sink: 2.2 m/s (430 ft/min)
- Lift-to-drag: 16:1
- Wing loading: 83 kg/m^{2} (17 lb/sq ft)

== See also ==
Aircraft of comparable role, configuration, and era

- Antonov A-7
- DFS 230
- Kokusai Ku-8
- Tsybin Ts-25
- Waco CG-3

Related lists

- List of aircraft of World War II
