= Waco CG-13 =

CG-13
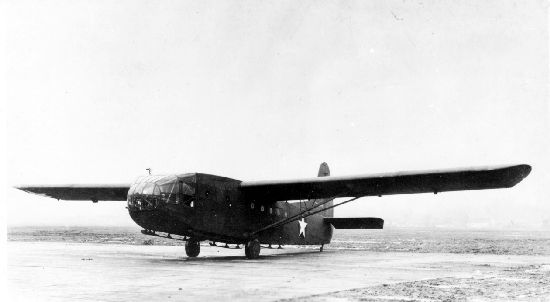
- The XCG-13

General information
- Type: Transport Glider
- Designer: Waco Aircraft Company
- Primary users: USAAF RAF
- Number built: 135

History
- Manufactured: 1945
- Introduction date: 1945
- First flight: 1943
- Retired: 1945

The Waco CG-13 was an American military transport glider aircraft developed during World War II. The Waco CG-13 was developed to meet a U.S. Army Air Forces requirement for a larger transport glider than the CG-4A, capable of carrying up to 42 troops or equivalent cargo.

== Design and development ==
Wright Field Glider Branch realized a need for a glider larger than the CG-4A and requested designs. The response by several companies produced designs for five larger gliders. One of these designs was the XCG-13 by Waco Aircraft Company of Troy, Ohio.

The XCG-13 contract was for a 30-place design with an 8,000 lb (3,600 kg) useful load capacity to fly 174 mph (280 km/h) at an altitude of 12,000 feet (3,700 m) altitude. Flight testing of the prototype was performed at Clinton County Army Air Field and the type was approved on 10 March 1943. Testing found that a tricycle landing gear should be used, and that a hydraulic system be incorporated to open the top-hinged nose opening. These features were incorporated into the second XCG-13.

Ford Motor Company at Kingsford, Michigan and Northwestern Aeronautical at St. Paul, Minnesota built YCG-13 models and were given contracts to build the production CG-13A. WACO was not given a production contract. Northwestern Aeronautical built 49 production articles. Ford built 48 as 30 place and 37 as 42 place by adding a bench down the center of the cargo section. Between the two companies, 268 contracted articles were canceled in favor of producing more CG-4A gliders.

== Operational history ==
The CG-13A glider maximum useful load was 10,200 lb (4,600 kg). The 79 mph (127 km/h) stall speed was 19 mph higher than specified. One CG-13A was flown in combat in the Aparri Mission in the Philippines. The CG-13A gliders were not flown in combat in Europe but were used as transports in England and France.

== Specifications (CG-13A) ==
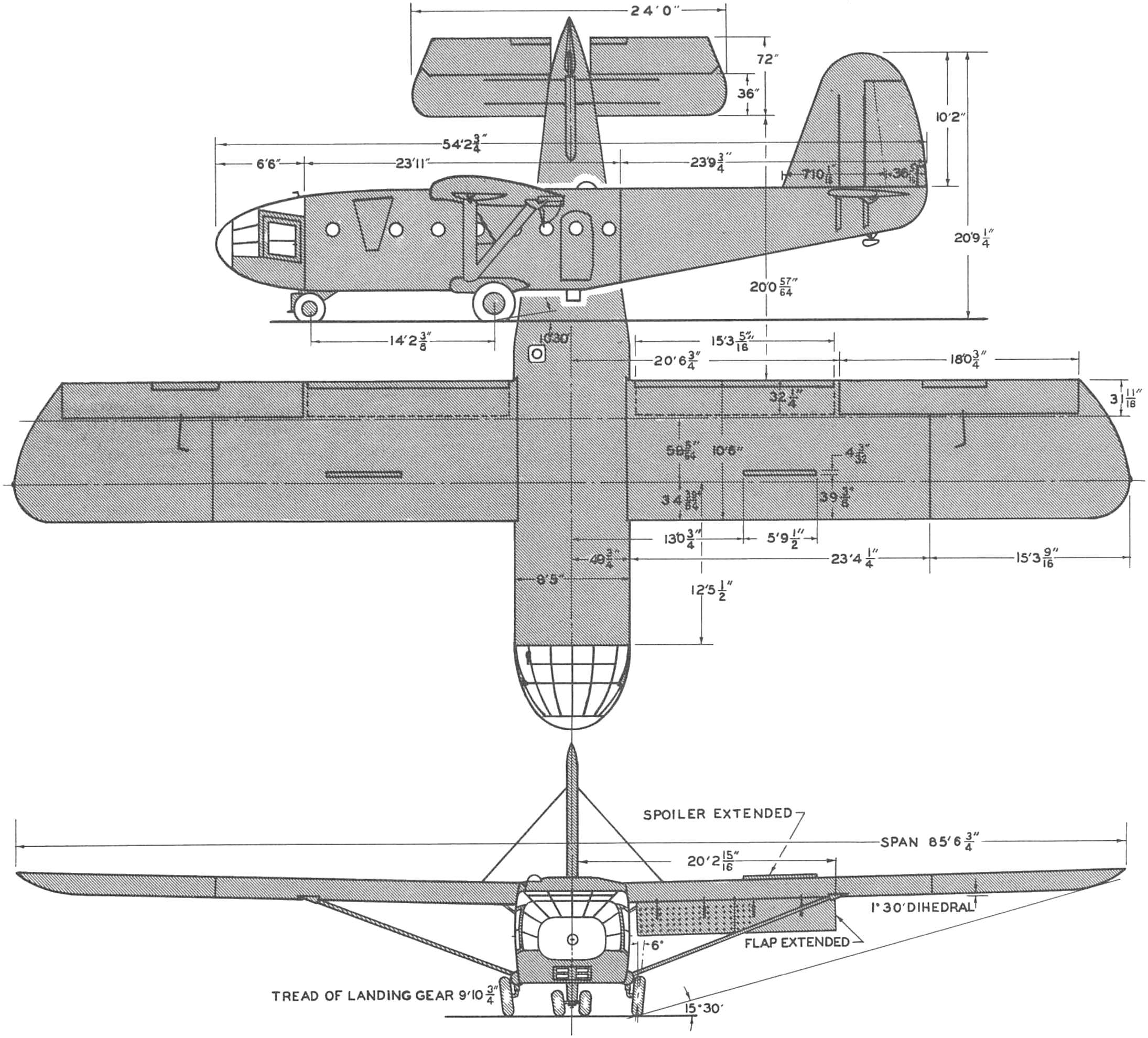
3-view line drawing of the Waco CG-13A

Data from The Concise Guide to American Aircraft of World War II, Fighting Gliders of World War II

General characteristics

- Crew: 2 pilots
- Capacity: 1x M2A1 105mm howitzer, 1x ½-ton 4 x 4 truck, ammunition, and gun crew; or 1x 1-ton 6 x 6 truck; 30 or 40 troops, equipped.
- Length: 54 ft 4 in (16.56 m)
- Wingspan: 85 ft 8 in (26.11 m)
- Height: 20 ft 3 in (6.17 m)
- Wing area: 873 sq ft (81.1 m^{2})
- Aspect ratio: 8.41
- Airfoil: NACA 43012
- Empty weight: 8,700 lb (3,946 kg)
- Gross weight: 18,900 lb (8,573 kg)

Performance

- Stall speed: 79 mph (127 km/h, 69 kn) Flaps down

83 mph (72 kn; 134 km/h) Flaps up

- Towing speed: 135 mph (117 kn; 217 km/h)
- Never exceed speed: 195 mph (314 km/h, 169 kn)

150 mph (130 kn; 241 km/h) with flaps down

- Wing loading: 21.65 lb/sq ft (105.7 kg/m^{2})

== See also ==
Related development

- Waco CG-4
- Waco CG-15

Aircraft of comparable role, configuration, and era

- Airspeed Horsa
- DFS 230
- General Aircraft Hamilcar
- General Aircraft Hotspur
- Gotha Go 242
- Schweizer cargo glider designs
- Slingsby Hengist

Related lists

- List of aircraft of World War II
- List of World War II military gliders

== Operators ==
United Kingdom

- Royal Air Force
  - Airborne Forces Experimental Establishment - two CG-13As for trials in 1945.

United States

- United States Army Air Forces
