= Waco CG-15 =

American military glider

CG-15
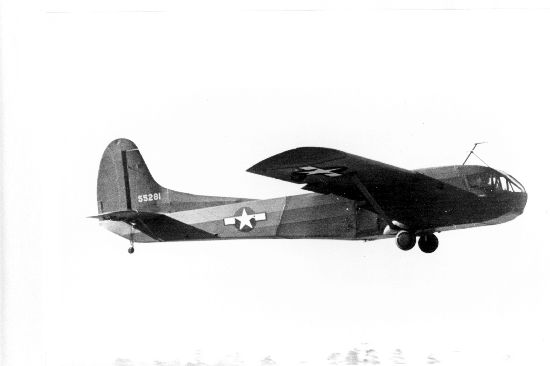
- CG-15A

General information
- Type: Military glider
- National origin: United States
- Manufacturer: Waco Aircraft Company
- Primary user: United States Army Air Forces
- Number built: 473

History
- Developed from: Waco CG-4

The Waco CG-15 was an American military glider, which was developed from the CG-4. Although outwardly similar to its predecessor and carrying the same number of passengers, a number of changes in the design, including shortened wings and a more streamlined nose enabled it to travel faster. 1,000 were ordered and 473 were delivered before production ceased. Two were transferred to the Navy for testing as the XLR2W-1. One unit was converted into an XPG-3 powered glider which used two Jacobs R-755-9 radial engines.

== Variants ==
XCG-15
Prototype converted from a CG-4A, one conversion.
XCG-15A
New-build prototypes, two built.
CG-15A
Production variant, redesignated G-15A in 1948, 427 built.
PG-3
One XCG-15A fitted with two R-755-9 engines, redesignated G-3A in 1948.
XLR2W-1
Two CG-15As transferred to the United States Navy.
G-3A
PG-3 redesignated in 1948.
G-15A
CG-15A redesignated in 1948.

== Operators ==
United States

- United States Army Air Force
- United States Navy

== Specifications (CG-15A) ==
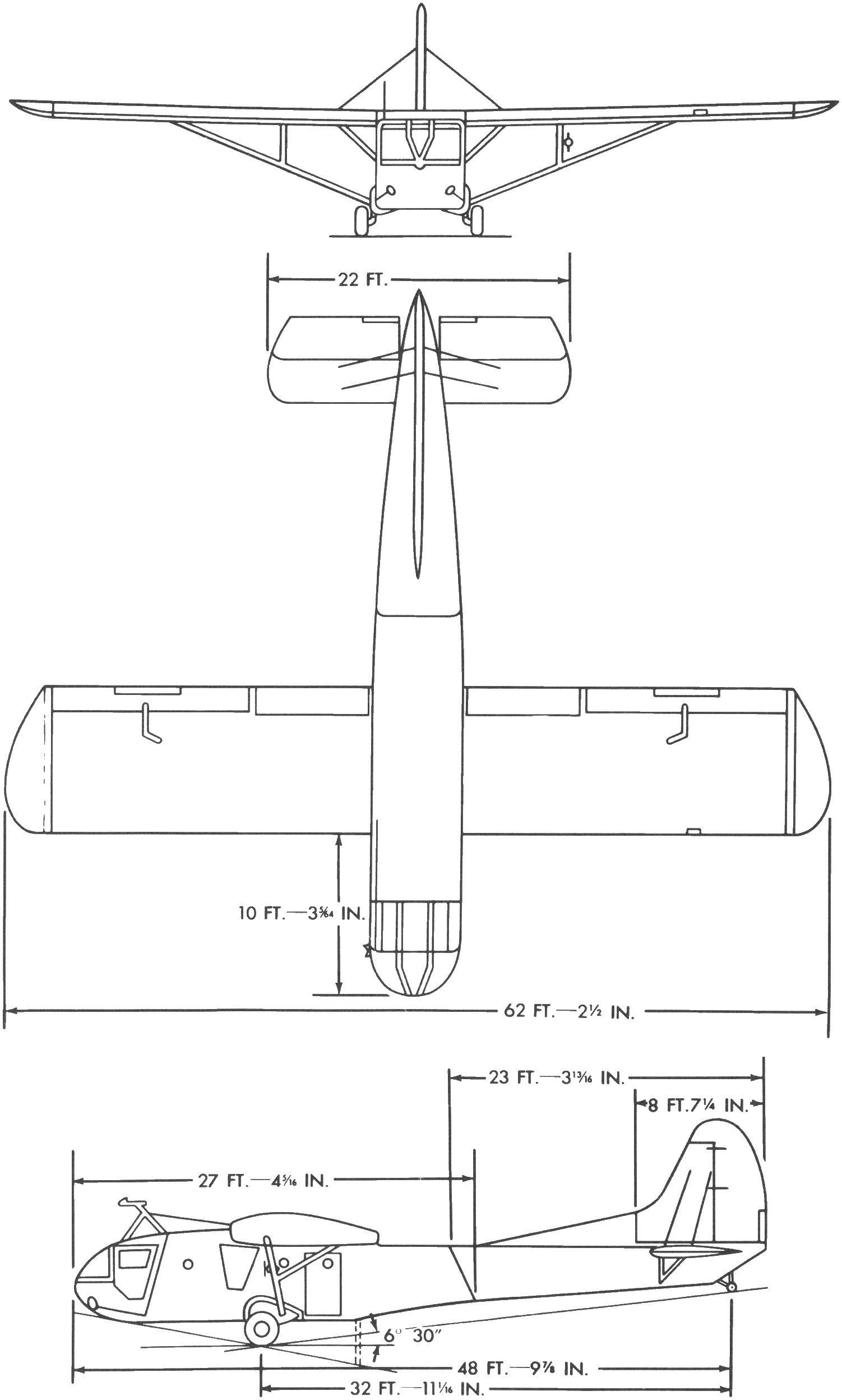
3-view line drawing of the Waco CG-15A

Data from Fighting Gliders of World War II

General characteristics

- Crew: 2 pilots
- Capacity: 13 troops / 4,035 lb (1,830 kg)
- Length: 48 ft 9.6 in (14.874 m)
- Wingspan: 62 ft 1.2 in (18.928 m)
- Height: 12 ft 8.4 in (3.871 m)
- Cargo compartment:

- Length: 13 ft 1.2 in (4.0 m)
- Width: 5 ft 10.2 in (1.8 m)
- Height: 5 ft 6 in (1.7 m)

- Wing area: 623 sq ft (57.9 m^{2})
- Aspect ratio: 6.21
- Airfoil: NACA 43012
- Empty weight: 4,000 lb (1,814 kg)
- Gross weight: 8,035 lb (3,645 kg)

Performance

- Stall speed: 62 mph (100 km/h, 54 kn) flaps up

53 mph (46 kn; 85 km/h) flaps down

- Never exceed speed: 180 mph (290 km/h, 160 kn)

100 mph (87 kn; 161 km/h) with flaps lowered

- Wing loading: 12.9 lb/sq ft (63 kg/m^{2})

== See also ==
Related development

- Waco CG-4A

Aircraft of comparable role, configuration, and era

- Airspeed Horsa
- DFS 230
- General Aircraft Hamilcar
- General Aircraft Hotspur
- Gotha Go 242
- Schweizer cargo glider designs
- Slingsby Hengist

Related lists

- List of aircraft of World War II
- List of World War II military gliders
