= DFS 331 =

Type of aircraft

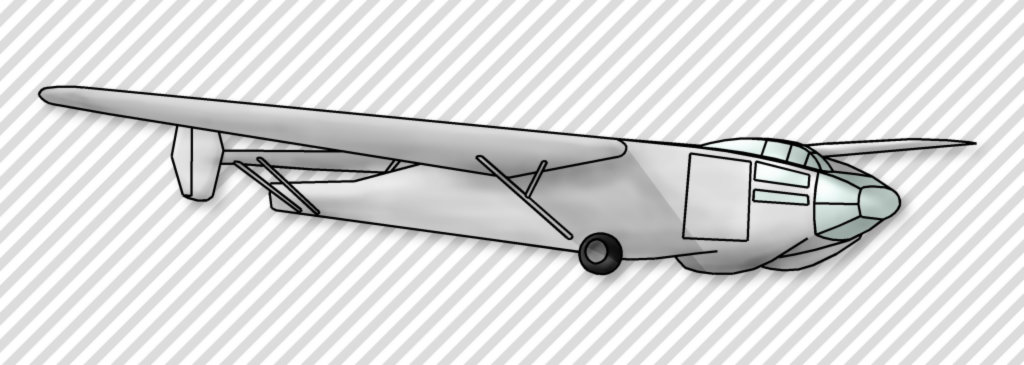

General information
- Type: Troop glider
- Manufacturer: DFS/Gotha
- Designer: Hans Jacobs
- Number built: 1

History
- First flight: 30 September 1940

After the success of the 1940 airborne assaults involving the DFS 230, the Reichsluftfahrtministerium (RLM/German Aviation Ministry) invited the Deutsche Forschungsanstalt für Segelflug/DFS and Gotha to submit plans for a larger capacity glider. The result was the DFS 331, a twenty-seat troop designed by Hans Jacobs, who had previously produced the successful, nine seat DFS 230.

The visibility from the cockpit was good, with the entire nose being glazed, and the body was very wide, allowing it to carry light Flak guns and small military vehicles. A single prototype, the V1, was built and flown in 1941. The best glide ratio, at fully loaded weight, was 17.5. The project was passed over in favour of the Gotha Go 242.

== Specifications ==
Data from Die Deutsche Luftrüstung 1933–1945, German gliders in World War II

General characteristics

- Crew: 2
- Capacity: 20 troops or 2,300 kg (5,071 lb) of cargo
- Length: 15.81 m (51 ft 10 in)
- Wingspan: 23 m (75 ft 6 in)
- Height: 3.55 m (11 ft 8 in)
- Wing area: 60 m^{2} (650 sq ft)
- Empty weight: 2,270 kg (5,004 lb)
- Gross weight: 4,770 kg (10,516 lb)

Performance

- Never exceed speed: 330 km/h (210 mph, 180 kn)
- Maximum glide ratio: 1:18
- Maximum towing speed: 330 km/h (205 mph)

Armament

- Guns: 2x 7.92 mm (0.312 in) MG 15 machine-guns

== See also ==
Related development

- DFS 230
- Gotha Go 242

Aircraft of comparable role, configuration, and era

- Airspeed Horsa
- Antonov A-7
- General Aircraft Hotspur
- Gribovsky G-11
- Slingsby Hengist
- Waco CG-4A

Related lists

- List of gliders
- List of military aircraft of Germany
- List of World War II military aircraft of Germany
- List of World War II military gliders
