= List of World War II military gliders =

This is a complete list of Second World War military gliders. Only vehicles that reached at least the prototype stage are included in this list.

== Argentina ==
- I.Ae. 25 Mañque, 13 soldliers and 2 crew. 1 built

== Australia ==
- DHA-G1 and G2, experimental transport gliders.

== Germany ==
- Blohm & Voss BV 40 (1944), fighter prototype.
- Blohm & Voss BV 246, glide bomb. Not used operationally
- DFS 230, light transport, 10 troops.
- DFS 331, heavy freight glider prototype, 1 built.
- Focke-Achgelis Fa 225, rotary wing glider. 1 built.
- Gotha Go 242 (1941), transport, 23 troops. 1,528 built.
- Gotha Go 244, motorised version of Go 242, 43 built and 133 Go 242B converted.
- Gotha Go 345 (1944), troop glider prototype.
- Gotha Ka 430, transport, 12 troops. 12 built.
- Junkers Ju 322 (1941) heavy transport prototype, 140 troops. 2 built.
- Messerschmitt Me 321 (1941), heavy transport 120 troops. 330 built.
- Messerschmitt Me 323 (1942), motorised development of Me 321, 211 built

== India ==
- Hindustan Aircraft Limited G-1, prototype glider

== Italy ==
- Aeronautica Lombarda AL.12P, 12 troops, 16 built (other source claims 2 prototypes, 6 on order, no delivered).
- C.A.T. TM-2 glider, 20 troops (other source claims 10 troops), 2 built. See the italian page for the description of the glider.

== Japan ==
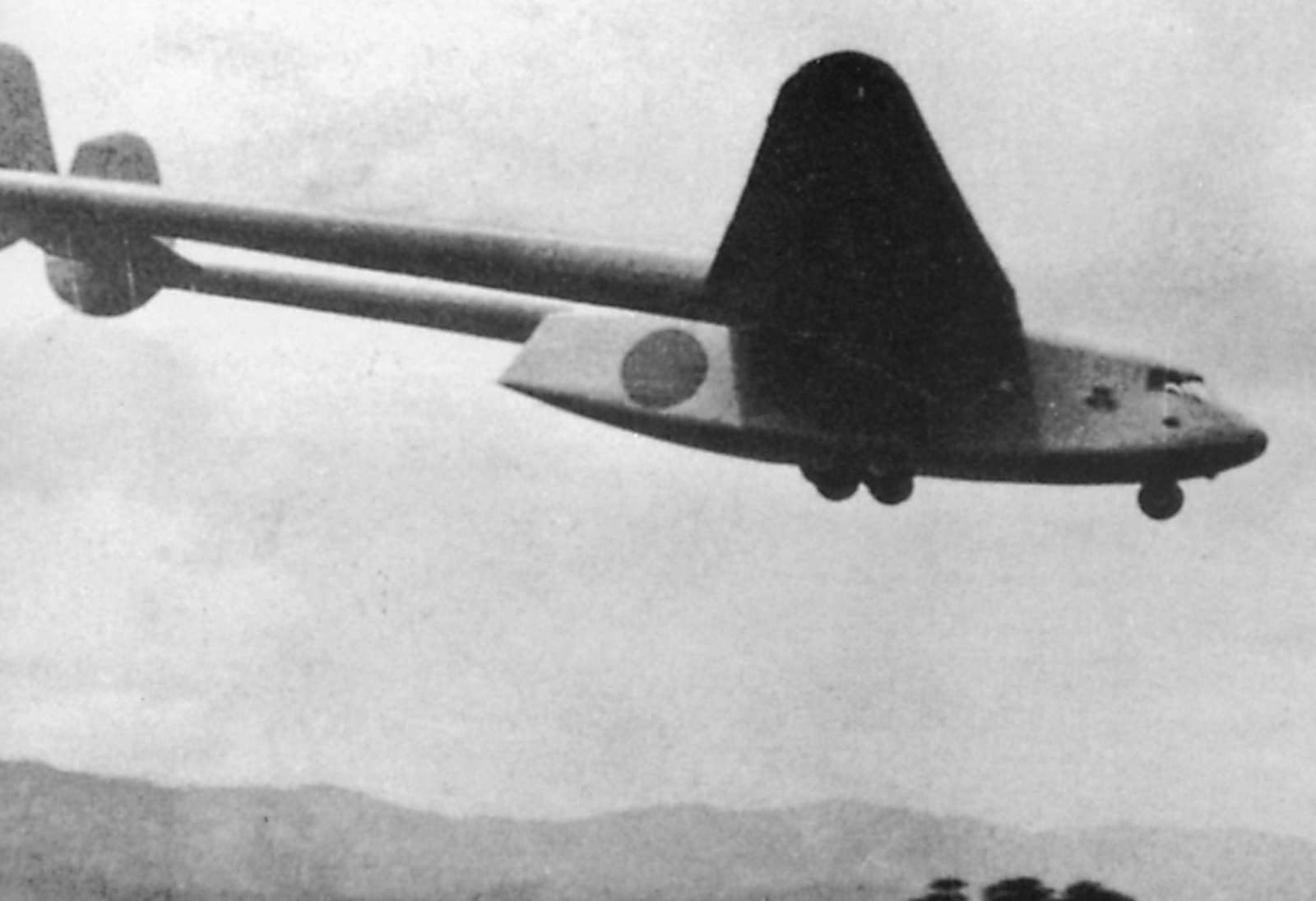
A Ku-7 glider.

=== Army ===
- Kayaba Ku-2, tailless single seat, prototype
- Kayaba Ku-3, tailless single seat, prototype
- Kokusai Ku-7 Manazuru "Buzzard", heavy transport, 32 passengers
- Kokusai Ku-8-II "Goose", troop transport 18 passengers and 2 crew
- Maeda Ku-1-I Type 2, troop transport, 8 passengers and 2 crew
- Nihon Kogata Ku-11, troop transport, 12 passengers and 2 crew
- Yokosuka Ku-13, experimental "Shusui" light/heavy glider

=== Navy ===
- Yokosuka MXY-5
- Yokosuka MXY-6, testing Motor Glider
- Yokosuka MXY8, "Akigusa", unpowered trainer for Mitsubishi J8M

== Poland ==
- Polikarpov BDP-2, 20 troops and 1 pilot, 2 built.

== Soviet Union ==
- Antonov A-7 (RF-8), 8 troops, 400 (approx) produced
- Antonov A-40, flying tank, prototype
- BDP (S-1) glider, 20 troops, 7 built.
- Gribovski G-11, 11 troops, about 100 built
- KT-20 glider, 24 troops, 1 or possibly 2 built.
- SAM-23 glider, 16 troops or a vehicle.
- TS-25 glider, 25 troops or a vehicle. 6 built.

== Sweden ==
- AB Flygindustri FI-3, 11 troops, 5 built.

== Turkey ==
- THK-1 glider, 11 troops, prototype.

== United Kingdom ==
- Airspeed Horsa, 28 passengers and 2 crew or equivalent weight of cargo including small vehicles. 3,655 built.
- Baynes Bat, (1943) experimental glider for testing design of a tank carrying glider
- General Aircraft Hamilcar, (1942) 7 t (6.9 long tons) of cargo and 2 crew. 412 built.
- General Aircraft Hamilcar Mk. X, Motorised version with 2x Bristol Mercury 31 of 965 hp. 22 examples converted
- General Aircraft Hotspur, trainer 8 passengers and 2 crew. more than 1,000 built.
- Slingsby Hengist, 15 passengers and 1 crew. 18 built.

== United States ==
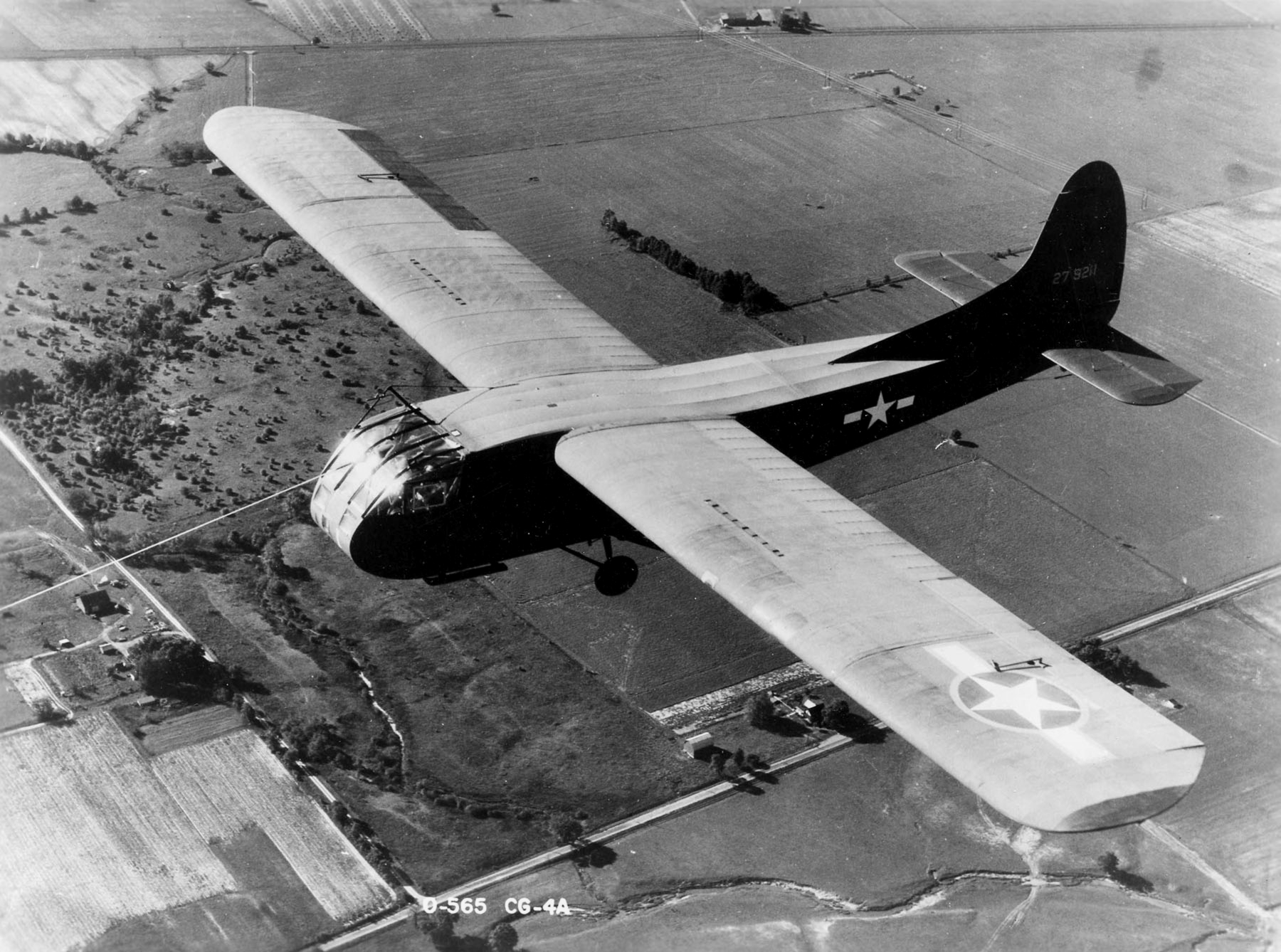
A Waco CG-4A glider

- Aeronca TG-5
- Allied Aviation XLRA
- Bristol XLRQ, amphibious assault glider
- Cornelius XFG-1, fuel carrier, 2 prototypes
- Douglas XCG-17, prototype based on de-engined C-47 Skytrain.
- Frankfort TG-1
- General Airborne Transport XCG-16A
- Laister-Kauffman TG-4
- Laister-Kauffman XCG-10A "Trojan Horse" large transport glider. Some confusion as to the differences between the XCG-10 and the XCG-10A. 2 prototypes built and flown.
- Piper LBP
- Piper TG-8
- Pratt-Read LBE
- Pratt-Read TG-32
- Schweizer TG-2
- Schweizer TG-3
- St Louis CG-5, prototype only
- Taylorcraft LBT
- Taylorcraft TG-6
- Waco CG-3
- Waco CG-4A Hadrian, 13 troops and 2 crew. More than 12,000 built, known in US Navy service as "Waco LRW-1"
- Waco CG-13A
- Waco CG-15

== See also ==
- List of gliders
- List of aircraft of World War II
- Glider snatch pick-up
