= Gotha Go 242 =

Transport glider used by the Luftwaffe during World War II

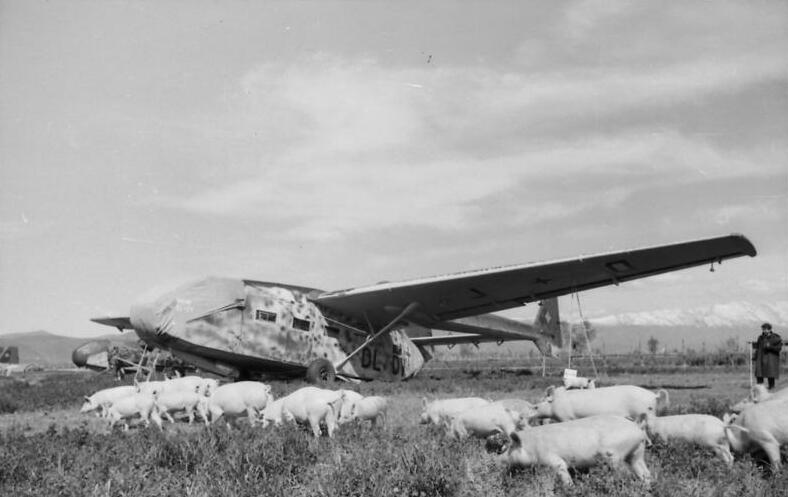
- Gotha Go 242 in Grosseto, 1943

General information
- Type: Transport glider
- Manufacturer: Gothaer Waggonfabrik
- Designer: Albert Kalkert
- Primary user: Luftwaffe
- Number built: 1,528

History
- Introduction date: 1941
- First flight: 1941
- Developed into: Gotha Go 244

The Gotha Go 242 was a transport glider used by the Luftwaffe during World War II. It was an upgrade over the DFS 230 in both cargo/troop capacity and flight characteristics. It saw limited combat action. There were multiple glider variants, and it became the basis for a transport aircraft, the: Gotha Go 244.

== Development ==
The Go 242 was designed by Dipl-Ing Albert Kalkert in response to a Reichsluftfahrtministerium (RLM) requirement for a heavy transport glider to replace the DFS 230 then in service. The requirement was for a glider capable of carrying 20 fully laden troops or the equivalent cargo.

The aircraft was a high-wing monoplane with a simple square-section fuselage ending in clamshell doors used to load cargo. The empennage was mounted on twin booms linked by a tailplane. The fuselage was formed of steel tubing covered with doped fabric. The flight characteristics of the design were better than those of the DFS 230.

Cargo versions of the glider featured a hinged rear fuselage loading ramp that could accommodate a small vehicle such as a Kübelwagen or loads of similar size and weight.

Two prototypes flew in 1941 and the type quickly entered production. A total of 1,528 were built, 133 B-1 to B-5s were converted to the Go 244, with two 500 kW (670 hp) Gnome-Rhône 14M engines, (a paired -04 and -05 rotating in opposite directions), fitted to forward extensions of the tail booms.

The Go 242 was tested with various rockets for overloaded take offs. A rack of four 470 N (106 lbf) Rheinmetall-Borsig 109-502 rockets mounted on the rear of the cargo compartment was tested but not used operationally. A second rocket, called "R-Gerät", also used with the glider, was a liquid-fuelled Walter HWK 109-500A (R I-203) Starthilfe; a podded monopropellant (T-Stoff, stabilised high test peroxide), rocket engine mounted beneath each wing and jettisoned after take-off, parachuting down to be recycled.

== Operational history ==
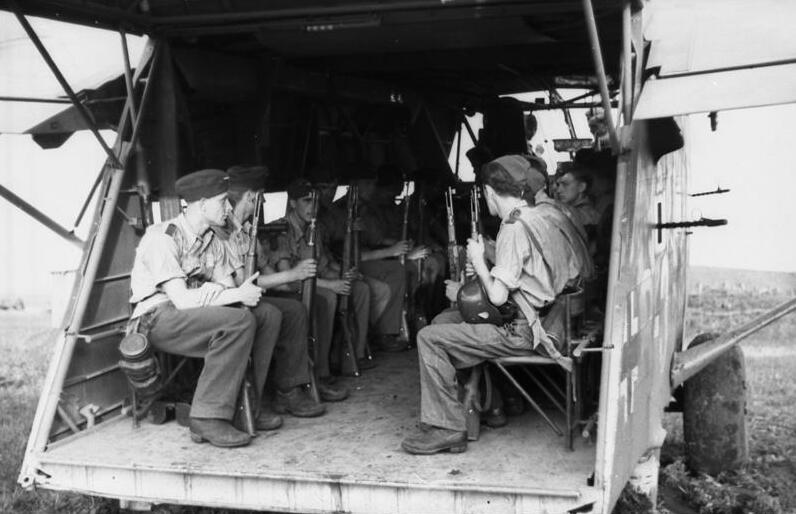
German troops seated in a Go 242, Russia, 1943. The glider is fitted with defensive machine guns

In service, Go 242s were towed into the air by Heinkel He 111s or Junkers Ju 52s, and were occasionally fitted with RATO equipment. Most saw service in the Mediterranean, North Africa and Aegean. Ju 87D-2s had strengthened rear fuselage and combined tailwheel and hook for towing the Go 242.

A few gliders, the Go 242 C-1 variant, were constructed with a flying boat-style hull allowing water landings. It was proposed that some carry a small catamaran assault boat with a 1,200 kg (2,600 lb) explosive charge suspended between its hulls. The proposed mission profile was for the pilot to land near an enemy ship and transfer to the assault boat, setting off at high speed for the enemy ship and locking the controls before bailing out.

== Surviving aircraft ==
- Gotha Go 242 - Musée de la Resistance du Vercors. Valence, France
- Gotha Go 242 C-1 - Technik Museum and Luftwaffenmuseum der Bundeswehr. Berlin, Germany

== Variants ==
- Go 242 A-1 - initial cargo-carrying version
- Go 242 A-2 - initial troop-carrying version
- Go 242 B-1 - cargo version with jettisonable landing gear
- Go 242 B-2 - B-1 with improved landing gear
- Go 242 B-3 - troop-carrying version of B-1 with double rear doors
- Go 242 B-4 - troop-carrying version with doors of B-3 and landing gear of B-2
- Go 242 B-5 - training version with dual controls
- Go 242 C-1 - maritime assault version with flying boat-style hull. Never used operationally

== Specifications (Go 242B) ==
Data from Die Deutsche Luftruestung 1933–1945 Vol.2 – Flugzeugtypen Erla-Heinkel

General characteristics

- Crew: 2
- Capacity: 23 equipped troops or 3,500–4,000 kg (7,700–8,800 lb) cargo
- Length: 15.8 m (51 ft 10 in)
- Wingspan: 24.5 m (80 ft 5 in)
- Height: 4.7 m (15 ft 5 in)
- Wing area: 64.4 m^{2} (693 sq ft)
- Aspect ratio: 9.32
- Empty weight: 3,200 kg (7,055 lb)
- Max takeoff weight: 7,100 kg (15,653 lb)

Performance

- Never exceed speed: 300 km/h (190 mph, 160 kn)
- Maximum glide ratio: 16:1
- Towing speed: 240 km/h (150 mph; 130 kn)

Armament

- 4 × 7.92 mm (0.312 in) MG 15 machine-guns

== See also ==
Related development

- Go 244

Aircraft of comparable role, configuration, and era

- DFS 230
- DFS 331
- Waco CG-4A
- General Aircraft Hamilcar
- Airspeed Horsa
- Slingsby Hengist

Related lists

- List of aircraft of World War II
- List of World War II military aircraft of Germany
- List of military aircraft of Germany
- List of World War II military gliders
