= General Aircraft Hamilcar =

British assault glider of the Second World War

GAL.49 Hamilcar
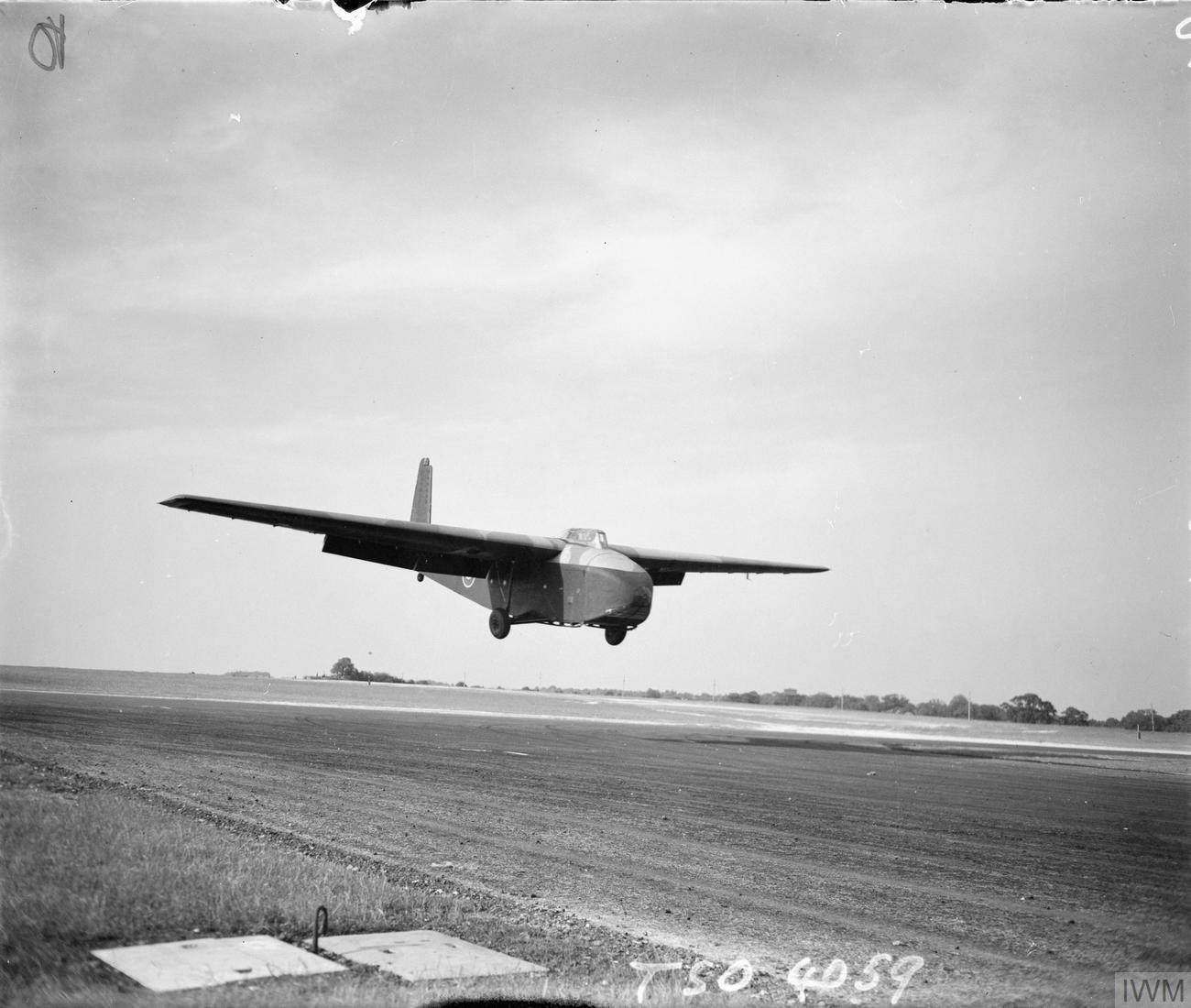
- A Hamilcar Mark I in flight

General information
- Type: Tank-carrying and heavy loads glider
- Manufacturer: General Aircraft Ltd
- Primary users: British Army, Army Air Corps, Glider Pilot Regiment Royal Air Force
- Number built: 344

History
- Manufactured: 1942–1946
- Introduction date: 1942
- First flight: 27 March 1942

The General Aircraft Limited GAL.49 Hamilcar or Hamilcar Mark I was a large British military glider produced during the Second World War, which was designed to carry heavy cargo, such as the Tetrarch or M22 Locust light tank. When the British airborne establishment was formed in 1940 by the order of Prime Minister Winston Churchill it was decided to develop a large glider which would be able to transport heavy equipment in support of airborne troops. General Aircraft Limited were chosen in January 1941 to develop this glider, which they designated the GAL.49 'Hamilcar'. It was designed to transport a light tank or two Universal Carriers. Problems, which included vacillation by the War Office on the number of gliders it wanted and poor management by GAL, led to delays in the production of the Hamilcar and it was not until mid-1943 that the first production glider was assembled. These problems were only partially solved and production of the glider continued to be slow, hampered by difficulties in finding suitable locations to store and construct them once their parts were produced. A total of 344 Hamilcars had been built when production ended in 1946.

Hamilcars were used on three occasions, and only in support of British airborne forces. They first saw action in June 1944, when approximately thirty were used to carry Ordnance QF 17 pounder anti-tank guns, transport vehicles and Tetrarch light tanks into Normandy in support of British airborne forces during Operation Tonga. In September 1944 a similar number of Hamilcars were used to transport anti-tank guns, transport vehicles and supplies for airborne troops as part of Operation Market Garden. They were used a third and final time in March 1945 during Operation Varsity when they transported M22 Locust light tanks and other supplies. The gliders proved to be successful in all three operations, although their slow speed and large size made them easy targets for anti-aircraft fire, which resulted in gliders being damaged or destroyed. A powered variant of the Hamilcar was produced, the Hamilcar Mark X, to extend the range of the Hamilcar so it could serve in the Pacific War; the conflict in the Pacific ended before the design could see combat.

== Development ==
=== Background ===
The British airborne establishment was formed in June 1940 under the orders of the Prime Minister, Winston Churchill, in response to the German use of airborne forces during the Battle of France. When the equipment to be used by the airborne forces was being developed, it had been decided by officials at the War Office that gliders would be an integral component of such a force; these would be used to transport troops and heavy equipment, which by 1941 had been expanded to include artillery and some form of tank. By the beginning of 1941, the War Office had issued four specifications for military gliders to be used by the airborne forces. The first was Air Ministry specification X.10/40, which called for an eight-seater glider similar to the German DFS 230, which eventually became the General Aircraft Hotspur I; the second was specification X.25/40 which became the Slingsby Hengist, a fifteen-seat glider; the third was specification X.26/40, the 25-seater Airspeed Horsa; and the last, X.27/40 was for a glider that could carry a light tank or other heavy loads. The number of aeronautical firms able to design and produce gliders was limited, especially since several were already committed to producing other prop-driven aircraft for the government; as such, contracts for the gliders were allocated to firms as the government saw fit, rather than through any competitive process. Slingsby was chosen to develop X.25/40 because it was believed to be too small to build larger gliders, and Airspeed would eventually build the Horsa. Because it had already developed the Hotspur, which first flew in November 1940, and was considered to have a sufficiently developed production capacity capable of producing a larger glider, General Aircraft Limited were chosen to develop X.27/40.

Before being selected, the company had already been in the process of developing designs for a glider which would carry a single Mk VII 'Tetrarch' light tank. The design was a low-wing aircraft designed so that the tank driver also functioned as the glider pilot, and flew the glider from his seat in the tank through a series of internal modifications to the tank. The idea behind the design was to save on specially trained glider pilots and allow the tank to be brought into action as soon as the glider landed; surviving illustrations of the design show the tank encased in the glider's fuselage but with the turret outside the airframe, possibly so that it could engage targets as it landed. However, the design was considered to be impractical, both by the company and the War Office, and a more conventional design was finally arrived at in a joint meeting between the two in January 1941. It called for a glider which would be constructed primarily out of wood capable of carrying a Tetrarch light tank or two Universal Carriers with a combined maximum weight of approximately 17,024 lb (7.722 t); a surviving requisition form from the Air Ministry to GAL confirms a cost of £50,000 per glider. By early February 1941 the basic design for the glider had been completed by the company's chief designer, and had been designated the GAL.49 with the service name 'Hamilcar'; the name came from the Carthaginian general Hamilcar Barca.

Such a large glider had never been constructed before by the British military, and to test the design, a half-scale prototype model was first designed; designated GAL.50 it still required an Armstrong Whitworth Whitley medium bomber to act as a tug to get it airborne, and was first flown in September 1941. However, it only flew once; the test pilot approached the landing area too low, attempted to raise the flaps for extra glide, and instead crashed the prototype and wrecked it. However, the trial was considered to be a success and the first full-scale prototype model was finished at GAL's works in Hanworth, Middlesex in March 1942. The Hamilcar was transported to RAF Snaith in Yorkshire, as GAL's airfield at Hanworth was too short for the glider to take off from; moving the glider to a secure military airfield would also ensure that it remained secret. Its first flight was conducted on 27 March 1942, towed by a Handley Page Halifax bomber. A second prototype was completed in June 1942, and further testing and development took place at several airfields, including the Airborne Forces Experimental Establishment at RAF Beaulieu; all flight trials appear to have been successful, and there were few differences between the prototypes and the production models.

=== Production problems ===
The number of Hamilcars that the War Office required frequently fluctuated. In May 1942 the War Office asked GAL for 360 Hamilcars to be used in two major airborne operations, but this was found to be unrealistic; not only was the production rate for the glider far too slow to accommodate this large number, the same number of tugs needed to tow the gliders could not be found. In November 1943 the War Office issued another report in which it increased the number of required gliders to 800, an even more unrealistic number; by the time production of the Hamilcar ended, a total of 344 had been built. GAL produced an initial run of 22 Hamilcars, which included the two prototype models and ten pre-production aircraft required for evaluation trials. Subsequent production of parts was assigned to a series of sub-contractors called the 'Hamilcar Production Group', which included the Birmingham Railway Carriage and Wagon Company, the Co-operative Wholesale Society and AC Cars. Production for the glider was targeted to begin in late 1941 with approximately 40–50 to be completed by the end of that year; in reality this was overoptimistic, with the planned 40–50 only being completed by June 1944.

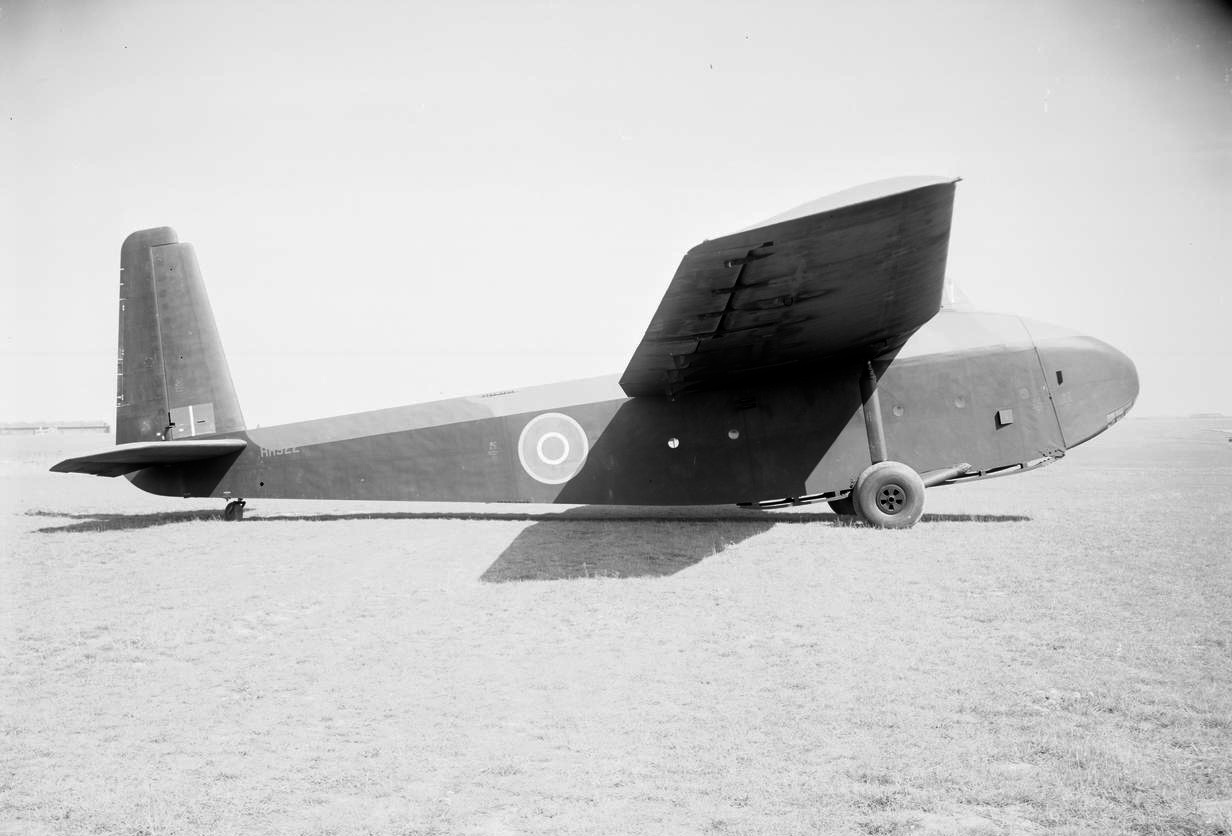
Side view of a Hamilcar Mark I

The slow rate of production for the Hamilcar appears to be the result of a combination of factors. There was a great demand on the specific types of wood required to build the glider, and difficulty in finding suitably large airfields with enough skilled personnel where the gliders could be constructed and stored; it also appears that a lack of official priority and poor management at GAL also impeded production. Between March and August 1942 GAL had promised eighteen Hamilcars would be built and delivered, but by September only one had actually appeared; this slow rate of production so concerned the Ministry of Aircraft Production that it appointed an 'Industrial Panel' of three senior industrial experts to visit GAL and detail the causes of the problems. The panel visited GAL in early September 1942 and issued a report on 24 September which stated that the root of the problems was that GAL appeared to have taken a bigger workload than it could handle, which was exacerbated by poor organisation and management skills. There were also conflicts between GAL and the Hamilcar Production Group which hurt production; the Group had been formed by the Ministry on 28 July in an attempt to speed up production, but senior GAL managers resented this and failed to co-operate fully with the Group. The panel also identified a 'piecemeal method of ordering' by the Ministry of Aircraft Production as a cause of further delays. Ultimately several senior managers and staff at GAL were replaced on the recommendation of the panel in an attempt to decrease internal conflicts and speed up production.

The ten pre-production gliders were eventually delivered by the end of 1942, and the first production glider was put together between March and April 1943. Production of parts and the building of complete gliders continued throughout 1943, but production schedules continued to fall behind, particularly when the United States Army Air Forces became interested in the glider, requiring a significant number to be completed for Operation Overlord, the airborne landings in Normandy, and others to be used in the Far East. This placed further pressure on GAL and the Hamilcar Production Group, as the USAAF demands would require further production and new flight trials to see if the glider would operate effectively in a tropical climate. In late 1943 the USAAF required 140 Hamilcars, which would be used to transport bulldozers and other construction equipment for airfield building, and in November it was agreed that 50 would be supplied to them by June 1944. However, the continued slow production of the gliders so concerned the USAAF that it cancelled its requirement in February 1944; this meant that American personnel who had been helping with the production of the gliders were withdrawn and production times were further delayed. It also meant that only British airborne forces would use the Hamilcar. By January 1944 only 27 Hamilcars had been erected and were ready for use; a total of 53 had been produced, but the rest were in storage awaiting parts to complete them or to be erected. Finding personnel to erect the gliders, and airfields to store them, continued to be a problem. By June, however, eighty of the gliders had been manufactured and erected and were ready for use in airborne operations, in time for a small number to be used during Operation Tonga, the British airborne landings in Normandy. Production continued throughout the conflict and finally ended in 1946, with a total of 344 being produced.

== Design ==
The Hamilcar was constructed primarily from wood, mainly birch and spruce, with fabric-covered plywood forming the skin, and high grade steel reinforcement beams in critical areas. It had a wingspan of 110 feet (34 m), a length of 68 feet (21 m) and a height of 20 feet (6.1 m) to the top of the fin with the tail down. It weighed 18,400 pounds (8,300 kg) when empty, and could transport a military load of 17,600 pounds (8,000 kg) to give a total weight of 36,000 pounds (16,000 kg). The whole aircraft was broken down into smaller sections for transport. It was so large and heavy that it required the largest and most powerful aircraft to pull it off the airfield and subsequently tow it; four-engined bombers were used, most frequently the Handley Page Halifax. Both wing and cockpit were set above the fuselage to provide the greatest amount of room for the cargo compartment, and to ensure that they did not interfere with the loading of vehicles; the compartment measured approximately 32 feet 31.5 inches (10.554 m), 7 feet 10.5 inches (2.400 m) inches wide and between 6 feet (1.8 m) and 7 feet 7 inches (2.31 m) inches in height. The nose of the glider was hinged and opened to the side for ease of loading vehicles and cargo, and the crew of two pilots were seated in tandem in a cockpit on the top of the fuselage, which was accessed via an internal ladder and was fifteen feet above ground; they were eventually protected by a bullet-proof windscreen and a plate of armour behind the second pilot. An intercom was also added to provide communication between the pilots and the personnel below them. An initial design feature, which was eventually removed prior to full-scale production, was the installation of an under-fuselage hatch which would allow the prone firing of a Bren light machine gun as the glider approached the landing zone.

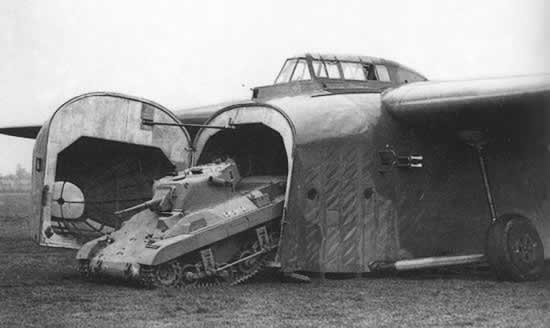
M22 Locust light tank leaving a Hamilcar glider. The deflated shock absorbers lowered the fuselage to the ground and allowed vehicles to exit without the use of ramps

The ratio between length and wingspan was practically the same as that of an Avro Lancaster bomber, which had a wingspan of 102 feet (31 m) and a length of 69 feet 6 inches (21.18 m), in contrast to modern sport gliders which possess a particularly large wingspan to enhance gliding performance. This was the result of a decision taken by the War Office in early 1940 on how military gliders would be used; the idea was for the glider to be released at a low altitude close to the landing zone and conduct a steep descent to reduce time in the air and exposure to enemy fire. The glider also possessed large flaps which assisted in a steep and rapid descent, and through adjustments of their angle during landing a precise control over descent rate and point of landing could be achieved; they also allowed a slower touchdown speed to be attained. They were operated through a small bottle of compressed air large enough only for a single landing; a small bottle not only saved weight, but gave a smaller chance of it being hit by enemy fire, thereby exploding and damaging the glider. Standard approach speed for the Hamilcar was 100 miles per hour (160 km/h), although for shorter landings this could be slowed to 80 miles per hour (130 km/h), and stalling speeds were 64 miles per hour (103 km/h) with flaps up or 52 miles per hour (84 km/h) with flaps deployed. The Hamilcar was fitted with tailwheel landing gear, with oleo-pneumatic shock absorbers that could be deflated to bring the fuselage nose down for loading or unloading purposes. A jettisonable undercarriage was initially designed for the glider, as it was discovered that it travelled for a shorter distance when it landed only on its skids. However, this was eventually replaced with a fixed undercarriage – the same as had been designed for ferrying operations – as pilots found that they preferred to land on wheels because of the extra control it gave them and the ability to avoid other gliders and potential collisions in the landing area. The wheeled undercarriage was not fitted until after the glider had been loaded; two 15-ton jacks were used to lift the aircraft for the fitting.

When the glider was carrying tanks or other vehicles, common practice was that their engines would be started in the air, usually just prior to the glider casting off from the tug; special exhaust ducts were fitted to the glider to expel exhaust fumes. The Tetrarch and M22 Locust light tanks were so large that they barely fitted inside the glider, and as such their crews stayed inside the tank for the duration of the flight. Once the glider landed, the anchorages keeping the vehicle stationary would be released by the driver pulling a lanyard within his reach, and the driver would then drive the tank forward, which automatically pulled a line that operated the swing door release. Universal Carriers and other vehicles relied on one of the pilots operating the door line manually. This was achieved by the pilot sliding down the fuselage and then dropping to the ground. They would then go to each undercarriage leg and release the valves there, which would expel hydraulic fluid and allow the shock absorbers struts to deflate, and then enter the glider and operate the door release line. If the swing door was jammed after the glider had landed, it was possible for tanks to break through the unopened forward fuselage and drive straight out of the glider, which occurred in both airborne operations where Hamilcars transported tanks.

== Operational history ==
When the parts for a Hamilcar were completed and the glider was erected, it was flown to RAF North Luffenham in Rutland to have its specific cargo placed on board, and it was then flown to RAF Tarrant Rushton, which had been selected as the Hamilcar training and operational base in November 1943. It was not possible to tow the glider empty, so any empty gliders usually carried Universal Carriers or concrete blocks as ballast. Training with the Hamilcar appears to have taken place primarily at RAF Tarrant Rushton, and began sometime between the end of 1943 and the first months of 1944. Hamilcar training began with dual instruction, where an instructor accompanied the pilots for several hours, and then moved onto flying solo flights. Most of this training consisted of 'circuits and bumps', where the pilots practised controlling the glider as it took off from an airfield under tow, and then landing it after the tow rope was detached; cross-country navigation was also practised. It was common practice for members of airlanded units to be inside the gliders as cargo when training took place, although there is evidence that tank crews only acted as cargo for one or two flights, probably due to the risk of accidents which might cost the lives of specialised troops and equipment. Those flights that tank crews did experience usually consisted of gliders landing on carefully marked airfields instead of the open countryside to minimise the risks involved, and also make recovery of the glider easier. Accidents do not seem to have been a common occurrence. During training by 'C' Squadron of the Glider Pilot Regiment, part of the Army Air Corps, which specialised in flying Hamilcars, over 2800 lifts were made with an average of 50 lifts per crew. Only three incidents resulted in fatalities or injuries, with seven pilots killed during the training.

=== Operation Tonga ===
Operation Tonga originated in the planning of Operation Overlord, the plan for the eventual invasion of France and the opening of a Second Front in North-Western Europe. Planning for the invasion of Europe by the Allies had begun in May 1943 when President of the United States Franklin Delano Roosevelt and Churchill had met at the Washington Conference. The two Allied leaders decided that all available Allied forces in the theatre should be concentrated in Great Britain, and that planning for the invasion of North-Western Europe should begin. A provisional target date of May 1944 was set, the code-name Overlord decided upon, and a joint Anglo-American planning staff created under Lieutenant-General Frederick E. Morgan, who was given the title of chief of staff to the Supreme Allied Commander (COSSAC). The plan eventually agreed upon called for the British 6th Airborne Division and the American 82nd and 101st Airborne Divisions to land either side of the landing areas to secure their flanks and protect the landing troops from counterattack. The British airborne forces were to land in the east and the American airborne forces to land to the west of Bayeux in support of the infantry and armoured units advancing from the beachheads. The operation began on the night of 5 June, with the deployment of 6th Airborne Division to eastern Normandy. It was tasked with protecting the eastern flank of the Allied seaborne landings, securing strategically important areas east of Caen, capturing several important bridges over the Caen Canal and River Dives, and destroying a coastal artillery battery.

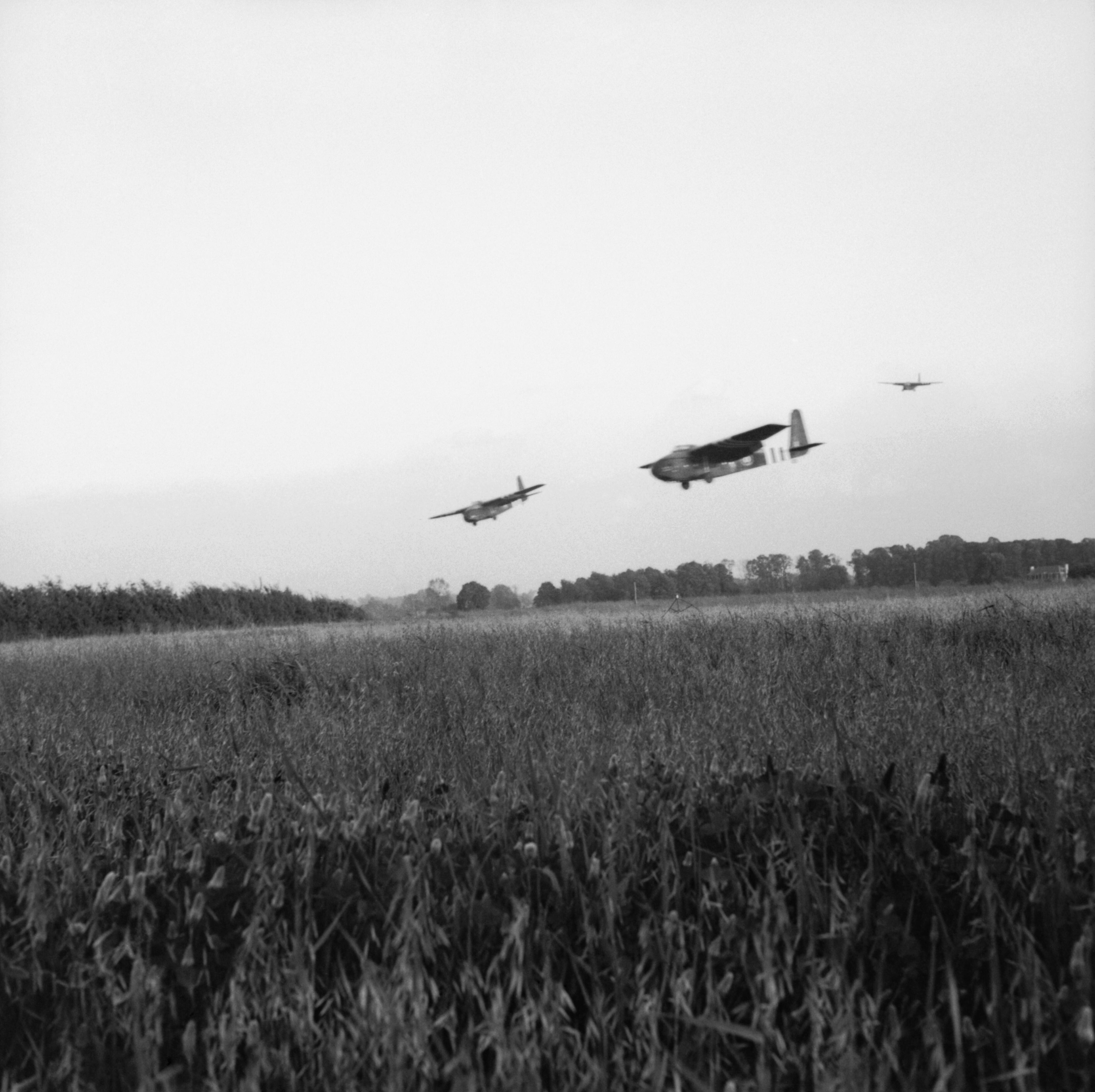
Hamilcar gliders of 6th Airlanding Brigade arrive on Drop Zone 'N' carrying Tetrarch tanks, 6 June 1944.

The division would use approximately 350 gliders for the operation, the majority of which would transport 6th Airlanding Brigade. This number included thirty-four Hamilcars; four would land in landing zone 'N' between 03:00 and 04:30 in support of the operations of 3rd Parachute Brigade and 5th Parachute Brigade, and would carry four 17-pounder anti-tank guns and their transport vehicles and crews. The other thirty would land at approximately 21:00 in landing-zone 'W' as part of a reinforcement lift. Twenty of the Hamilcars would carry Tetrarch light tanks and their crews which belonged to 6th Airborne Armoured Reconnaissance Regiment, four more carried three Rota trailers without crews, and another three carried Universal Carriers with their crews. The last three carried two Universal Carriers converted to accommodate a 3-inch mortar, one Universal Carrier which carried a slave battery, sixteen motorcycles and a jeep. The four Hamilcars which were to land in support of 3rd and 5th Parachute Brigades took off from Tarrant Rushton at 02:10 on 6 June and were due to land at approximately 03:30; however, only two landed successfully. One suffered a broken tow rope shortly after it took off, although it was able to land safely at an airfield in England; the other reached the Normandy coast, but the tow rope was disconnected too early and it landed a considerable distance away from the landing zone. When dawn broke, it was discovered by German forces and attacked; four of the crew and passengers were killed and one captured, but the rest managed to escape.

The remaining Hamilcars took off between 18:40 and 19:35 with the rest of the gliders which would transport 6th Airlanding Brigade and began their journey towards the landing zone. One Hamilcar, which was transporting a Tetrarch light tank, was lost over the English Channel when the tank broke loose of its shackles and crashed through the nose of the glider that was carrying it, causing both to fall into the sea mid-flight. The rest of the gliders arrived safely at the landing zone at approximately 21:00, flying astern of each other as closely as possible; several accounts mention that the sight of the Hamilcars and other gliders as they landed was a great morale booster for Allied troops who saw them. However, their landings were not all without incident. Two Hamilcars collided with each other in the landing zone, destroying themselves and the Tetrarchs they carried; a third Hamilcar hit another Tetrarch as it was being unloaded and flipped the tank upside down, rendering it unusable, although the crew escaped without injury. Another Hamilcar rammed several of the wooden poles that had been driven into the ground by the Germans to damage gliders, which resulted in one of its wings being completely torn off as it landed. However, there were few casualties and actual German opposition to the gliders as they landed was minimal. Of those gliders that survived the journey and made a successful landing, many later suffered heavy damage from German artillery and mortar fire, as well as the movement of Allied armour through the landing zones. Although approximately forty gliders were later repaired and flown back to Britain, none of these were Hamilcars as their size precluded any attempt to recover them.

=== Operation Market Garden ===
After their defeat in Normandy from June to August 1944, remnants of German forces withdrew across the Low Countries and eastern France towards the German border. In the north, in the first week of September, the Anglo-Canadian 21st Army Group (Field Marshal Bernard Montgomery) was advancing on a line running from Antwerp to the northern border of Belgium with its British Second Army (Lieutenant-General Sir Miles Dempsey) while the First Canadian Army (Lieutenant-General Harry Crerar) had commenced its task of recapturing the ports of Dieppe, Le Havre and Boulogne-sur-Mer. To the south, the US 12th Army Group (Lieutenant General Omar Bradley) was nearing the German border and had been ordered to advance on the Aachen gap with the US First Army (Lieutenant General Courtney Hodges) in support of Montgomery's advance on the Ruhr, while its US Third Army (Lieutenant General George S. Patton) moved eastward towards the Saar. The US 6th Army Group (General Jacob L. Devers) was advancing towards Germany after Operation Dragoon, the invasion of southern France. Montgomery devised an ambitious plan called Operation Market Garden which would take place in mid-September; it was intended to bypass the Siegfried Line by hooking around its northern end and thereby allow the Allies to cross the Rhine in force and trap the German 15th Army between Arnhem and the shores of the IJsselmeer. Market, the airborne element of the plan, would employ four of the six divisions of the First Allied Airborne Army. The US 101st Airborne Division (Major General Maxwell D. Taylor) would drop in two locations just north of XXX Corps to take the bridges north-west of Eindhoven at Son and Veghel. The 82nd Airborne Division (Brigadier General James M. Gavin) would drop north-east of them to take the bridges at Grave and Nijmegen and the British 1st Airborne Division (Major-General Roy Urquhart) and the Polish 1st Independent Parachute Brigade would drop at the extreme north end of the route, to take the road bridge at Arnhem and the rail bridge at Oosterbeek.

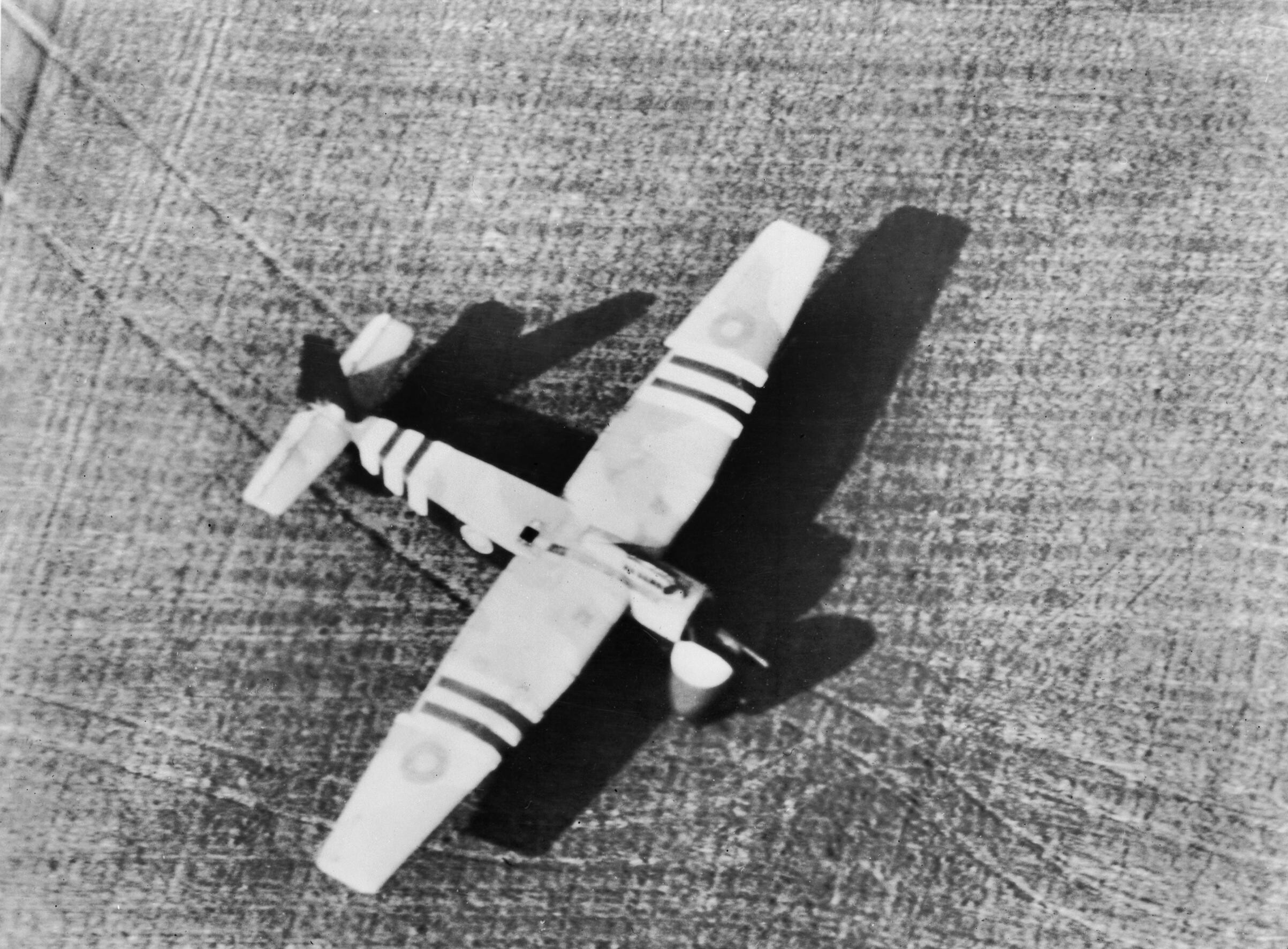
An aerial view of a Hamilcar on the ground at Arnhem during Operation Market Garden – the glider has landed a vehicle, the tracks of which can be seen leaving the aircraft in front of the open nose door

A lack of sufficient transport aircraft meant that 1st Airborne Division would be dropped in three separate lifts over three successive days. 1st Parachute Brigade and most of 1st Airlanding Brigade would land on 17 September, 4th Parachute Brigade and the rest of 1st Airlanding Brigade would land on 18 September, and on 19 September the Polish 1st Independent Parachute Brigade would land, along with a supplies for the entire division. The division would use approximately 650 gliders during the operation, of which 39 would be Hamilcars. It appears that the Hamilcars that had been used by 6th Airborne Division and subsequently abandoned in June had been replaced, as records state that 64 of the gliders were available by September. Thirteen Hamilcars would be flown on 17 September and land in landing zone 'Z'. Eight of the gliders would carry 17-pounder anti-tank guns, their towing vehicles and crews, and the other five would carry ten Universal Carriers, two apiece; the Carriers were to act as transports for the airborne troops. On 18 September fifteen Hamilcars would land in landing zone 'X'; eight would carry a 17-pounder anti-tank gun, their towing vehicles and crews each, and the other four would carry eight Universal Carriers, which would once again act as transport for the airborne troops that were flown in. The final three were packed with ammunition and stores, as well as sappers from the Royal Engineers; these were experimental loads, as it was believed that the Hamilcar might be a more efficient way of transporting supplies rather than the Horsa due to its larger size. On 19 September, ten Hamilcars would transport American engineers who belonged to the American 878th Aviation Engineer Battalion and their equipment, which included bulldozers, cranes and graders; they were to construct a forward airfield in landing zone 'W' after the gliders had been cleared away.

All fifteen Hamilcars which participated in the first lift on 17 September arrived over the landing zones safely, but problems were experienced when they came in to land. Two of the gliders landed on soft ground, which caused them to rapidly decelerate; this, combined with the majority of their equipment being in the front of the gliders, resulted in them flipping onto their backs. Three of the pilots were killed and the fourth was badly wounded and later taken prisoner, and several passengers were wounded; the 17-pounder anti-tank guns on board the gliders were damaged beyond repair. The rest of the Hamilcars landed successfully, although one overran the landing zone and hit a railway embankment; this damaged the two Universal Carriers being carried by the glider, although both were later salvaged. The lift on 18 September was delayed for several hours due to poor weather conditions, and the glider force did not take off until approximately 11:00. En route to the landing zones, one Hamilcar was forced to cast off and land at an airfield in England after its tow aircraft developed engine trouble, and another ditched in the English Channel when its tug developed engine troubles as well; both had been carrying 17-pounder anti-tank guns. The rest of the Hamilcars encountered heavy anti-aircraft fire as they landed, with several being hit. As a result, one Hamilcar landed short of the landing zone after being hit in the wing, and another was forced to make an emergency landing far from the landing zone after being hit; the stores, pilots and passengers were captured by German forces shortly after the glider landed. The rest of the Hamilcars landed successfully. The third lift on 19 September did not take place due to weather problems, and because several of 1st Airborne Division's landing zones had been overrun. Finally on 21 September the weather cleared, but due to 1st Airborne Division's deteriorating situation it was decided that the 878th Aviation Engineer Battalion would not be delivered. As such, only a single Hamilcar accompanied 1st Polish Independent Parachute Brigade when it set off for its drop near the town of Driel; this was the same Hamilcar which had been forced to land in England on 19 September when its tug had experienced engine trouble. However, the tow rope between the glider and tug snapped over Belgium, and it was forced to land near Ghent.

=== Operation Varsity ===
By March 1945, the Allied armies had advanced into Germany and had reached the River Rhine. The Rhine was a formidable natural obstacle to the Allied advance, but if breached would allow the Allies to access the North German Plain and ultimately advance on Berlin and other major cities in Northern Germany. Following the "Broad Front Approach" laid out by General Dwight D. Eisenhower, the Supreme Allied Commander of the Allied Expeditionary Force, it was decided to attempt to breach the Rhine in several areas. Montgomery, commanding the British 21st Army Group, devised a plan to allow the forces under his command to breach the Rhine, which he entitled Operation Plunder, and which was subsequently authorised by Eisenhower. Plunder envisioned the Second Army and the US Ninth Army (Lieutenant General William Simpson) crossing the Rhine on three fronts; at Rees, Wesel and in the area south of the Lippe Canal. To ensure success, Montgomery insisted that the amphibious assaults be supported by an airborne landing, which was code-named Operation Varsity. Varsity was initially planned with three airborne divisions in mind, with all three to be dropped behind German lines in support of 21st Army Group as it conducted its amphibious assaults to breach the Rhine. However, during the earliest stages of planning, it became apparent to the planners that the 13th Airborne Division would be unable to participate in the operation, as there were only enough combat transport aircraft in the area to effectively transport two divisions. The plan for the operation was therefore altered to accommodate the two remaining airborne divisions, the British 6th Airborne and the US 17th Airborne Division. The two airborne divisions would be dropped behind German lines, with their objective to land around Wesel and disrupt enemy defences to aid the advance of the Second Army towards Wesel.

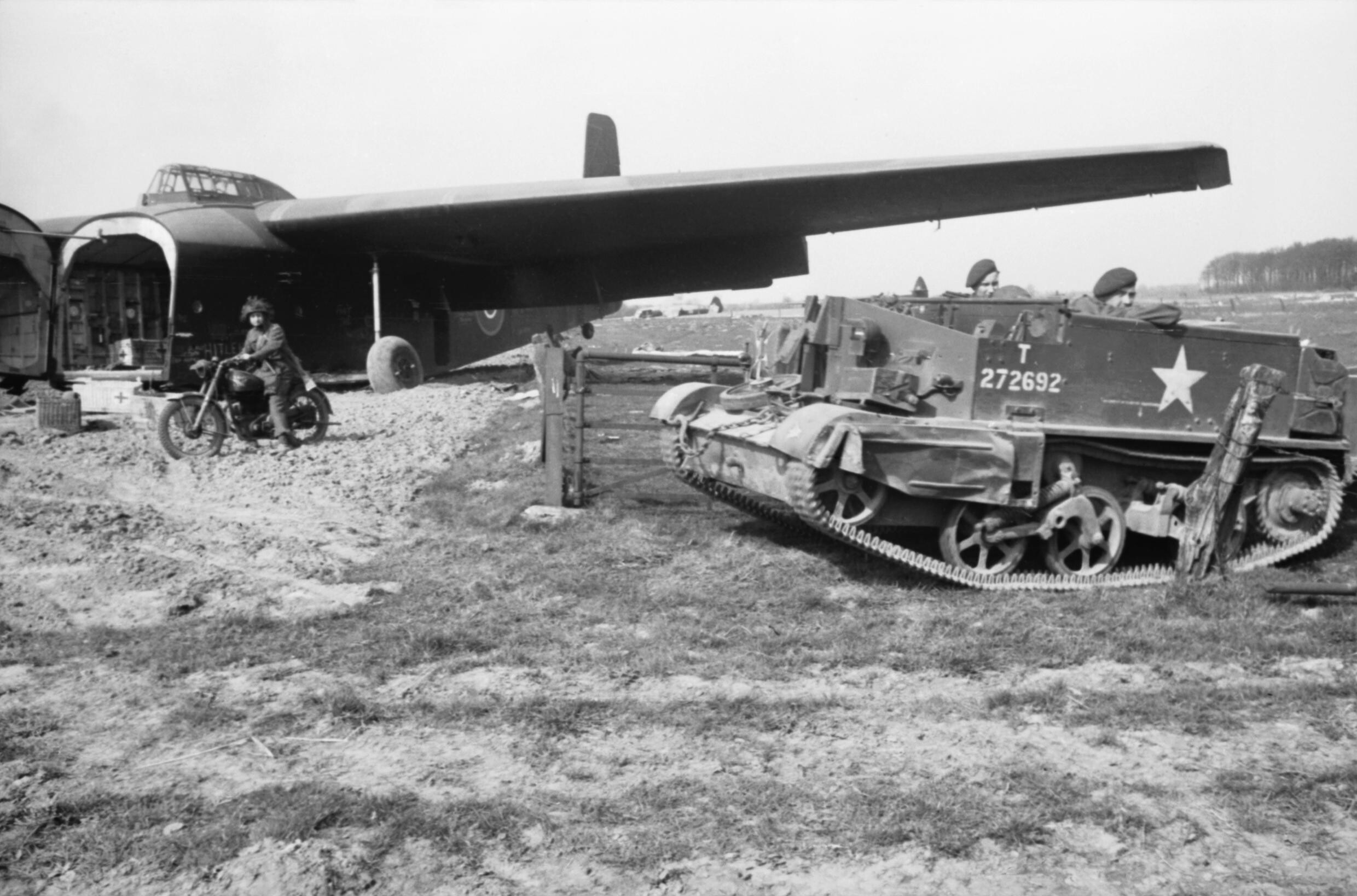
A Universal Carrier unloaded from a Hamilcar glider during Operation Varsity

6th Airborne Division would be dropped in a single lift, unlike Operation Market Garden, and was to seize the high ground north of the town of Bergen, capture the town of Hamminkeln and several bridges over the river IJssel, and then hold the northern portion of the operational area until relieved by Allied ground forces. The division would use 440 gliders for the operation, which included a large number of the new Horsa Mark II and 48 Hamilcars. The loads assigned to the Hamilcars were similar to those used during Operation Market Garden, with sixteen of the gliders transporting 17-pounder anti-tank guns, as well as their vehicles and crews. Twelve were assigned to 716th Airborne Light Composite Company of the Royal Army Service Corps, and were loaded with twelve Universal Carriers, trailers and stores of ammunition and equipment. The company were to use the Universal Carriers and trailers, along with transport to be provided by 6th Airlanding Brigade, to collect, control and issue supplies dropped by aerial resupply drops to the airborne troops as they fought. Eight Hamilcars were to transport M22 Locust light tanks which belonged to 6th Airborne Armoured Reconnaissance Regiment, and another four were to carry panniers of supplies. Two more were to carry a single Royal Engineers D4 bulldozer each, and finally 3rd Parachute Brigade and 5th Parachute Brigade were assigned three Hamilcars each; these would each carry a Universal Carrier for use as transport by the headquarters staff of the brigades.

All of the gliders successfully took off at 07:20 on 24 March, but seven were lost en route to the landing zones, the majority being forced to cast off and land in Allied territory due to their tugs suffering engine failures; however, one Hamilcar which carried an M22 Locust broke up in mid-air as it approached the Rhine, possibly due to structural failure, and all aboard were killed. Three more of the gliders were destroyed by German anti-aircraft fire as they approached the landing zones, as their slow speed made them easy targets. The thirty-eight that remained landed successfully between 10:46 and 11:00, although some of them suffered damage from anti-aircraft fire. Particularly hard hit were the Hamilcars that carried the RASC personnel and supplies; eight landed successfully, but only three were sufficiently undamaged to allow the stores they carried to be recovered. Of the eight Hamilcars that transported the M22 Locusts of 6th Airborne Armoured Reconnaissance Regiment, seven reached the landing zones intact but had problems when they landed due to anti-aircraft fire and smoke obscuring the area. Four landed safely, but the other three came under heavy German anti-aircraft fire and crashed as they landed; one tank survived with a damaged machine gun, another crashed through a house which put its wireless radio set and main armament out of action, and the third broke loose of the glider as it landed and was flipped over onto its turret, which rendered it useless. After the operation had come to an end, a few of the undamaged Hamilcars were dismantled and their parts shipped to England to aid in the construction of further gliders.

=== Post-war ===
Operation Varsity was the last time that the Hamilcar would be used in combat, but the model did remain in service for several years after the end of the Second World War; they were particularly useful for transporting large and heavy loads. On 31 December 1945 64 Hamilcars were recorded as being present at RAF Tarrant Rushton, where they were used for routine training exercises. However, in January 1946 a process was begun to dispose of 'surplus' Hamilcars, with 44 moved to disposal facilities and twenty remaining. The remainder continued to be used for routine flying exercises until July, when six more were disposed of due to 'glue deterioration', and by February 1947 only twelve were left in operation. These last few Hamilcars appear to have remained in service until 1950, with several used in airshows and public displays by the RAF, and were ultimately phased out as obsolescent by the mid-1950s.

== Variants ==
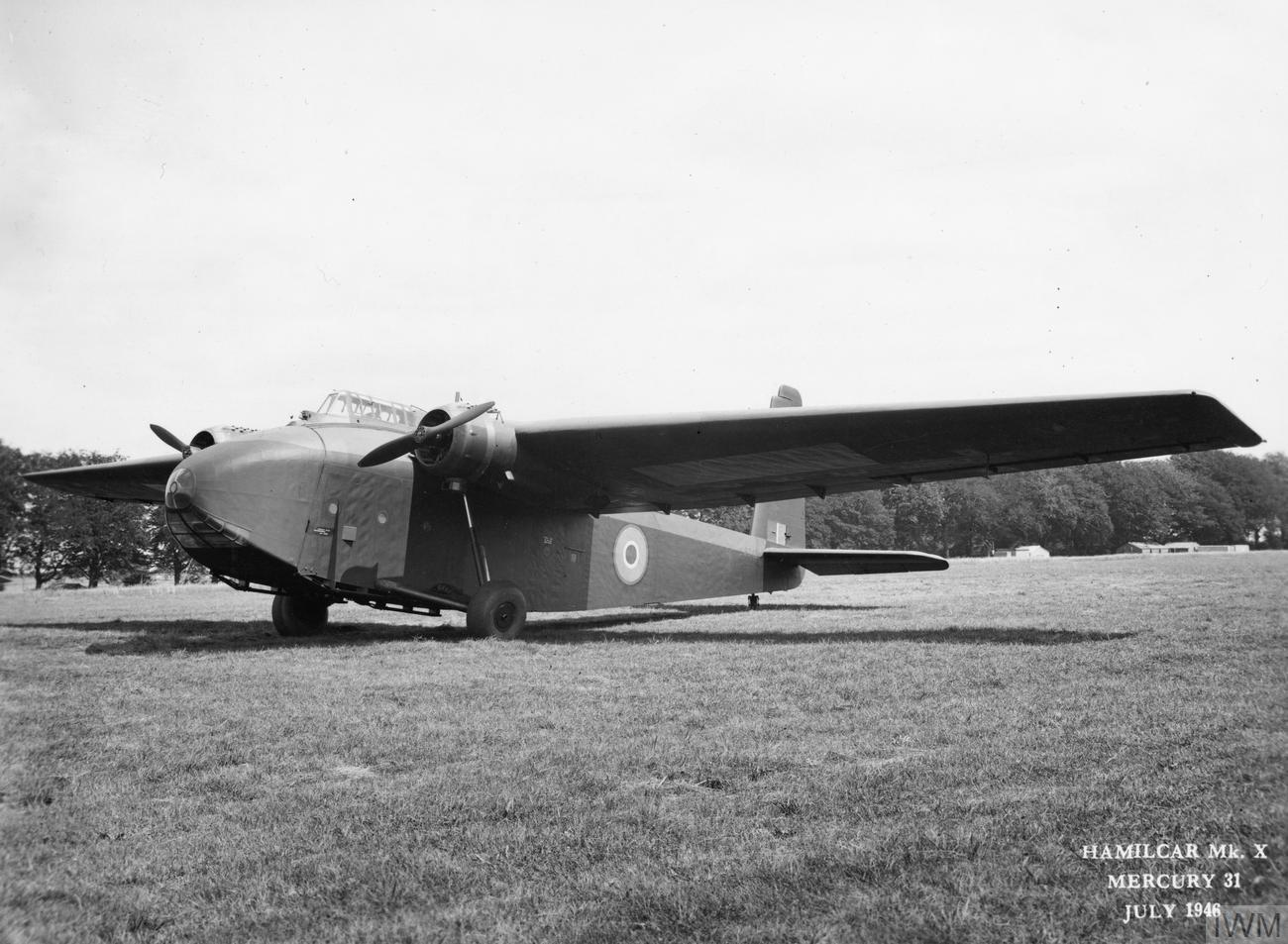
Hamilcar Mark X, converted from a Mark I

Several variants on the Hamilcar Mark I were planned, although only one was actually produced. The Hamilcar Mark X, also known as the GAL.58, was designed to specification X 4/44 in an attempt to allow Hamilcars to be used in the tropical climate of the Pacific, where high temperatures and the high altitudes of many airfields reduced the efficiency of piston-engined aircraft. This meant that Halifax bombers could not tow Hamilcars without a drastically reduced fuel load, which in turn narrowed the range of the Hamilcar. Two initial solutions were proposed to correct this problem; the first was to convert a Hamilcar into a rocket-assisted take off (RATO) aircraft. Two steel cylinders filled with twenty-four three-inch rockets were attached to either side of the glider to provide it with 20,000 pounds-force (89,000 N) of mean thrust as it took off; they would then be jettisoned once the glider was airborne. Initial trials conducted in January 1943 proved to be successful, but was not pursued any further for unknown reasons. The second solution was double towing, where two Halifax aircraft, one stripped of all unnecessary equipment, attached tow ropes to a Hamilcar and then took off from an airfield; once airborne the normal Halifax would then detach its towrope and land, and the modified Halifax would tow the glider to its destination. However, this idea went no further than initial trials in England, as it was considered to be a high risk operation with a high probability of a serious accident occurring. As such, a powered version of the Hamilcar, the Mark X, was decided upon, as it offered the possibility of long-range airborne operations and the ability to retrieve the glider once it had been used. The decision was taken to start developing the Mark X in November 1943 when the potential for airborne operations against Japan itself began to be considered by the Allies; however, for some reason a relaxed view was taken to the development of the production models, and the first was not available until the early months of 1945.

The first prototype was converted from a Hamilcar Mark I. Two Bristol Mercury radial piston engines, capable of producing 965 hp (720 kW) each were added to the wings of the glider, and the wings and fuselage were strengthened so they could take the weight of the engines. Extra controls were added to the cockpit and duplicated in the two pilot positions, although space restrictions meant that the glider could only be started from the rear seat, and fuel tanks were added to the wings, with the possibility of a third being carried in the fuselage. These additions increased the glider's weight to 47,000 lb (21 t), but its other dimensions remained unchanged, including the carrying capacity in the fuselage. The first flight of the Mark X, under its own power, took place in February 1945 and the initial flight and further trials showed that the glider operated as had been expected. With engines installed, a Mark X could be towed by a fully loaded Halifax and achieve an operational radius of approximately 900 mi (1,400 km). However, if the glider itself was fully loaded and took off on its own power, it could not maintain height even at full power; this resulted in a decision to decrease the amount of cargo it could carry under its own power, which in turn decreased its weight to 32,500 lb (14.7 t). Two Hamilcar Mark Is were converted for initial trials, and when these proved satisfactory a further eight Mark Is were converted and ten Mark Xs built from scratch; any further orders were cancelled when the conflict ended in August 1945, although further tests were conducted in the United States. One other Hamilcar variant was proposed, although it never went into production or appeared to go further than the design stage. This was a proposal to mate a Lockheed P-38 Lightning fighter to the top of a Hamilcar, as the fighter would provide enough power to keep both aircraft in flight and relieve the glider pilots of the task of controlling the glider until it cast off to land.

While the unpowered glider could not be flown lightly loaded and needed ballast, the Hamilcar X was less sensitive to centre of gravity issues and could be flown empty. The performance of the Hamilcar X under its own power and loaded to maximum weight was similar to performance under tow. At 32,500 lb (14.7 t), it could take off in 1,385 yd (1,266 m). Its maximum speed was 145 mph (233 km/h) but it could cruise at 120 mph (190 km/h). With 400 gallons of fuel it could manage 705 mi (1,135 km) in still air or 1,675 mi (2,696 km) with 860 imp gal (3,900 L) of fuel onboard replacing the cargo capacity.

== Operators ==
United Kingdom

- British Army
- Royal Air Force

== Survivors ==
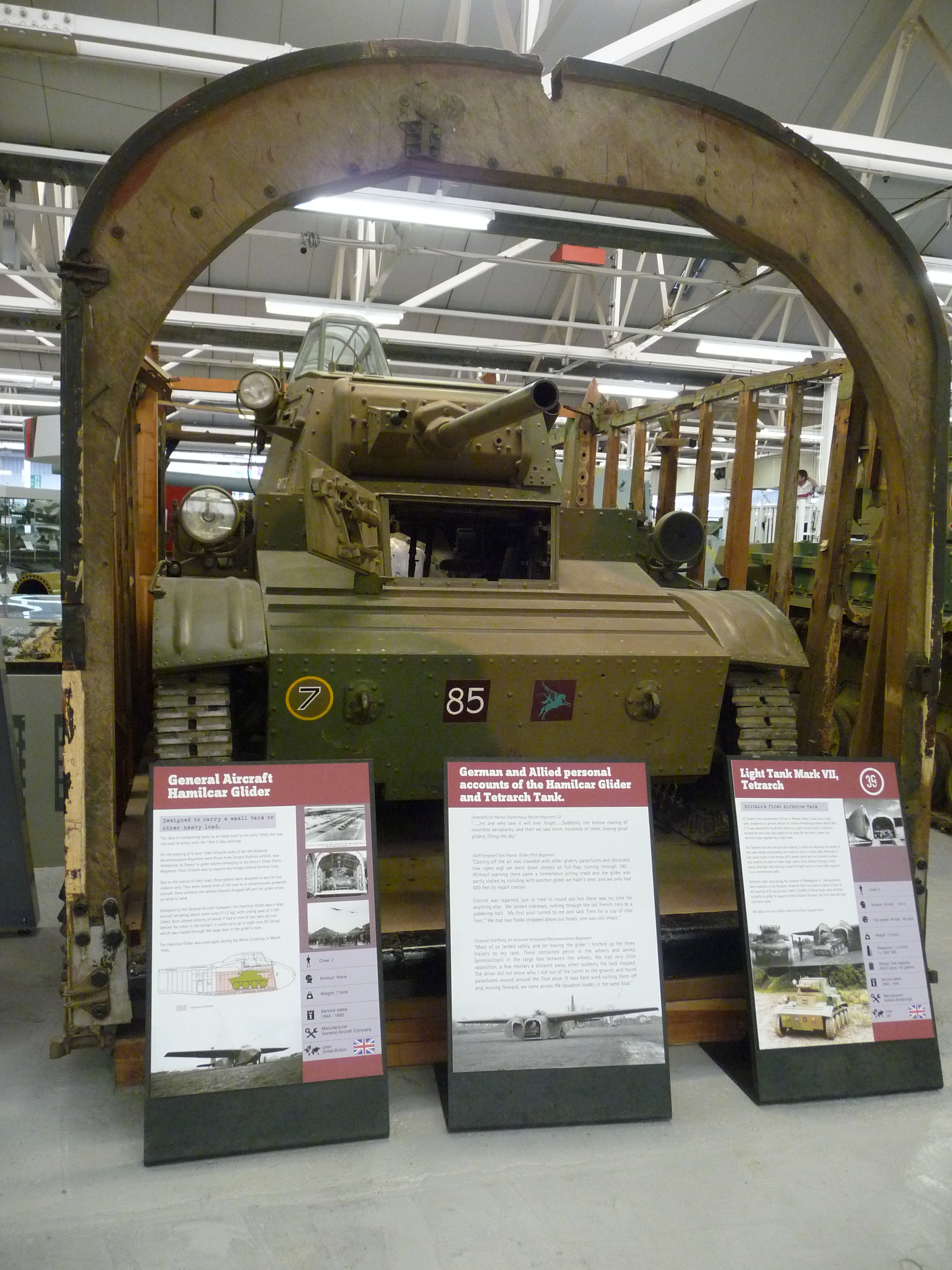
A Tetrarch tank and a section of Hamilcar glider fuselage, Bovington Tank Museum (2010)

A significant proportion of the fuselage of Hamilcar TK777 is preserved at the Army Flying Museum in Middle Wallop in Hampshire, England. A badly preserved section of the fuselage of TK718 is part of the collection of the Bovington Tank Museum, where it is displayed with a Tetrarch tank.

== Specifications ==
Data from Jane's All The World's Aircraft 1945-1946

General characteristics

- Crew: 2
- Capacity: 8 t (8,000 kg) payload
- Length: 68 ft (21 m)
- Wingspan: 110 ft 0 in (33.53 m)
- Height: 20 ft 3 in (6.17 m)
- Wing area: 1,657.5 sq ft (153.99 m^{2})
- Airfoil: RAF 34 modified
- Empty weight: 18,400 lb (8,346 kg)
- Max takeoff weight: 36,000 lb (16,329 kg)

Performance

- Maximum speed: 150 mph (240 km/h, 130 kn) aerotow speed
- Stall speed: 65 mph (105 km/h, 56 kn)
- Never exceed speed: 187 mph (301 km/h, 162 kn)
- Wing loading: 22.37 lb/sq ft (109.2 kg/m^{2})

== See also ==
Aircraft of comparable role, configuration, and era

- Ilyushin Il-32 – experimental post-war Soviet glider
- Yakovlev Yak-14 – post-war Soviet glider with similar cockpit configuration
- Winged tank
  - Antonov A-40 – experimental Soviet design of a kit to convert a T-60 tank into a glider
  - Baynes Bat – experimental, one-third-scale prototype for a British, flying-wing tank-carrier

Related lists

- List of aircraft of World War II
- List of World War II military gliders

== Sources ==
- Bennett, David (2008). A Magnificent Disaster. Newbury: Casemate Publishers. ISBN 978-1-932033-85-4.
- Bridgman, Leonard, ed. (1946). Jane's All The World's Aircraft 1945–1946. London: Samson Low, Marston & Co. OCLC 852153027.
- Dank, Milton (1977). The Glider Gang: An Eyewitness History of World War II Glider Combat. Cassel. ISBN 978-0-304-30014-3.
- Devlin, Gerard M. (1979). Paratrooper – The Saga of Parachute & Glider Combat Troops During World War II. Robson Books. ISBN 978-0-312-59652-1.
- Ellis, Major L. F.; Warhurst, Lieutenant-Colonel A. E. (2004) [1st. pub. HMSO 1968]. Butler, J. R. M. (ed.). Victory in the West: The Defeat of Germany. History of the Second World War United Kingdom Military Series. Vol. II (repr ed.). Uckfield: Naval & Military Press. ISBN 978-1-84574-059-7.
- Flint, Keith (2006). Airborne Armour: Tetrarch, Locust, Hamilcar and the 6th Airborne Armoured Reconnaissance Regiment 1938–1950. Helion. ISBN 978-1-874622-37-6.
- Hibbert, Christopher (2003) [1962, Phoenix, London]. Arnhem. Gloucs: Windrush Press. ISBN 978-1-84212-727-8.
- Lloyd, Alan (1982). The Gliders: The Story of Britain's Fighting Gliders and the Men who Flew them. London: Corgi. ISBN 978-0-552-12167-5.
- Lynch, Tim (2008). Silent Skies: Gliders At War 1939–1945. Barnsley: Pen & Sword Military. ISBN 978-0-7503-0633-1.
- Mondey, David (1994). British Aircraft of World War II. London: Chancellor Press. ISBN 978-1-85152-668-0.
- Otway, Lieutenant-Colonel T.B.H. (1990). The Second World War 1939–1945 Army – Airborne Forces. London: Imperial War Museum. ISBN 978-0-901627-57-5.
- Weeks, John (1976). Airborne Equipment: A History of its Development. Newton Abbot: David & Charles. ISBN 978-0-7153-7117-6.
- "Hamilcar Glider". Flight. XLVI (1877). London: IPC Transport Press: 634–38, 646. 14 December 1944. ISSN 0015-3710.
