= General Aircraft Hotspur =

British military glider of the Second World War (1940–1943)

GAL.48 Hotspur
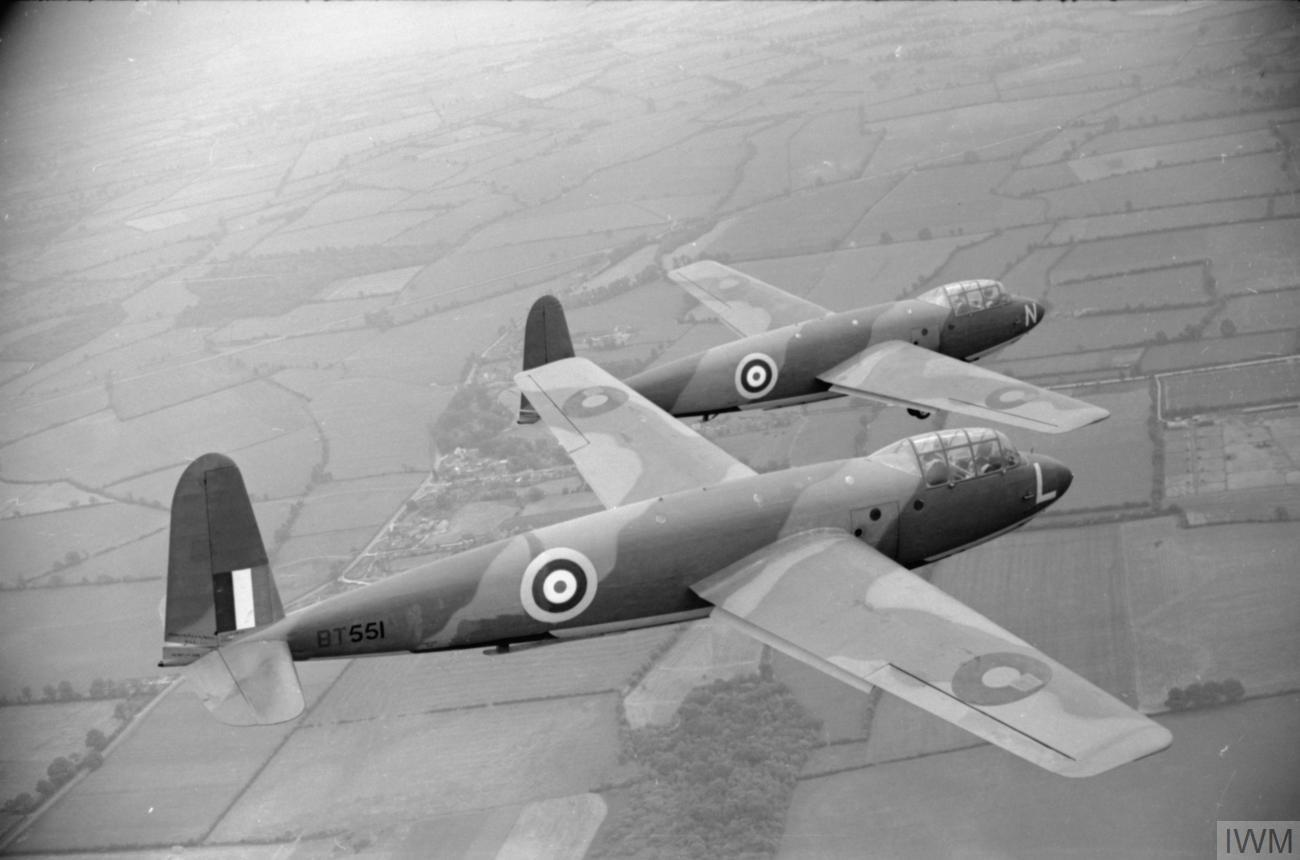

General information
- Type: Training glider, transport glider– 8 troops
- Manufacturer: General Aircraft Limited
- Primary users: British Army Royal Air Force
- Number built: 1,015

History
- Manufactured: 1940–1943
- First flight: 5 November 1940

The General Aircraft GAL.48 Hotspur was a military glider designed and built by the British company General Aircraft Ltd during World War II. When the British airborne establishment was formed in 1940 by order of Prime Minister Winston Churchill, it was decided that gliders would be used to transport airborne troops into battle. General Aircraft Ltd were given a contract by the Ministry of Aircraft Production in June 1940 to design and produce an initial glider for use by the airborne establishment, which resulted in the Hotspur.

Conceived as an "assault" glider which necessitated a compact design and no more than eight troops carried, tactical philosophy soon favoured larger numbers of troops being sent into battle aboard gliders. Therefore, the Hotspur was mainly relegated to training, where it excelled and became the basic trainer for the glider schools that were formed.

The Hotspur was named after Sir Henry Percy, a significant captain during the Anglo-Scottish wars who was also known as "Hotspur".

== Development ==
=== Operational requirements ===
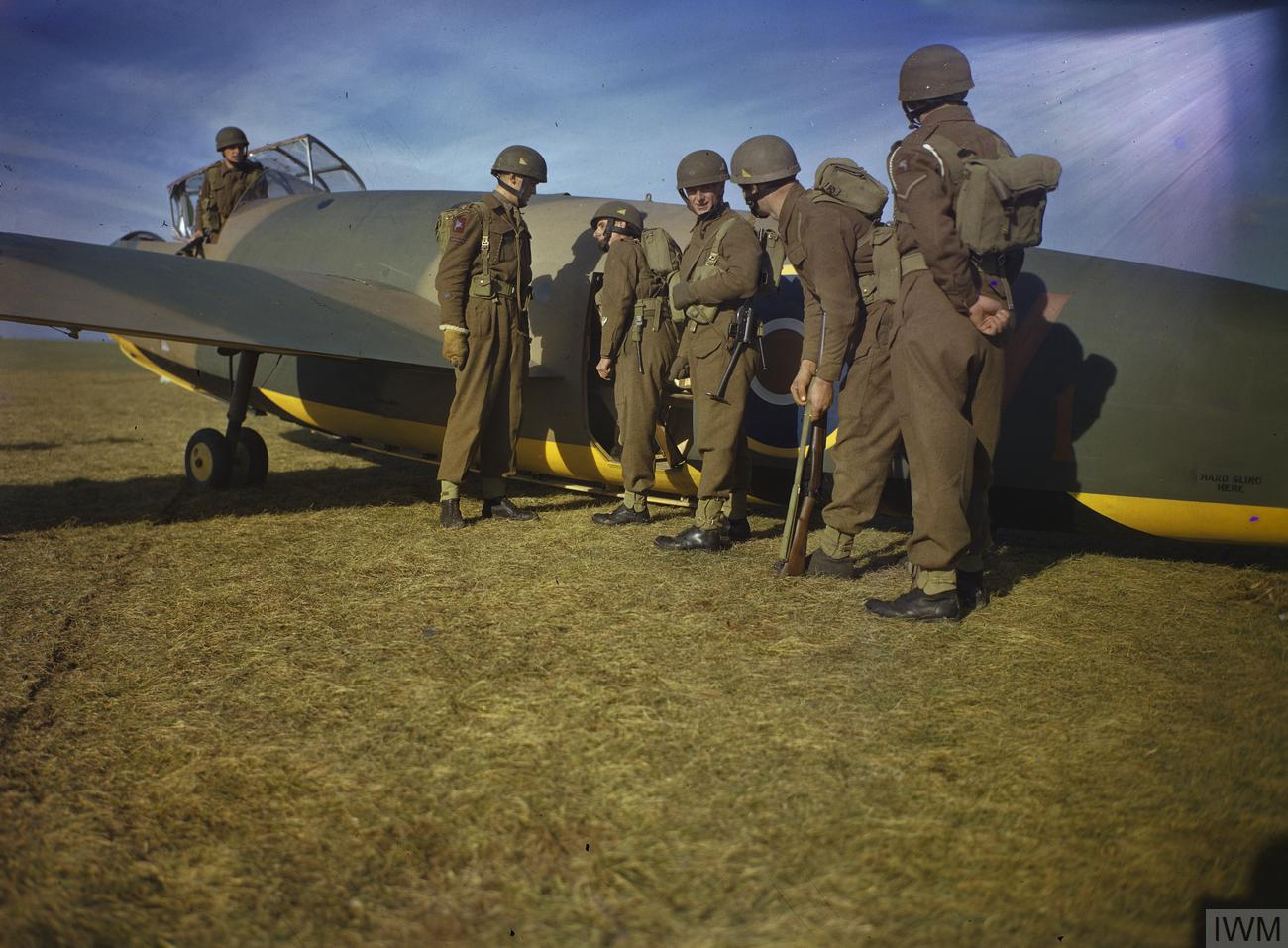
Airborne forces with a Hotspur glider

The German military had pioneered using airborne formations, conducting several successful airborne operations during the Battle of France in 1940, including the Battle of Fort Eben-Emael. Impressed by the success of German airborne operations, the Allied governments decided to form their own airborne formations. This decision would eventually lead to the creation of two British airborne divisions, as well as a number of smaller units. The British airborne establishment began development on 22 June 1940, when the Prime Minister, Winston Churchill, directed the War Office in a memorandum to investigate the possibility of creating a corps of 5,000 parachute troops. When the equipment to be used by the airborne forces was under development, War Office officials decided that gliders would be an integral component, to transport troops and heavy equipment.

On 21 June 1940 the Central Landing Establishment was formed at Ringway airfield near Manchester; although tasked primarily with training parachute troops, it was also directed to investigate using gliders to transport troops into battle. It had been decided that the Royal Air Force and the Army would cooperate in forming the airborne establishment, and as such Squadron Leader L. A. Strange and Major J.F. Rock were tasked with gathering potential glider pilots and forming a glider unit; this was achieved by searching for members of the armed forces who had pre-war experience of flying gliders, or were interested in learning to do so. The two officers and their newly formed unit were provided with four obsolete Armstrong Whitworth Whitley bombers and a small number of Tiger Moth and Avro 504 biplanes for towing purposes.

As this unit was in the process of being formed, in June the Ministry of Aircraft Production contracted General Aircraft Ltd to design and produce an initial glider type for use by the airborne establishment. It would be used for both assault and training purposes, and would be capable of transporting eight airborne troops. The glider had to be capable of a long approach during landing, due to the prevailing belief at the time that gliders would have to be released a considerable distance from the target and glide in to ensure the sound of the towing aircraft did not alert the enemy. It therefore had to be aerodynamically stable, but also cheap and easy to construct as it would only be used once. The Hotspur was intended to have an operational range of 100 miles (160 km) when released at high altitude, although in practice this was reduced to 80 miles (130 km) when released from a height of 20,000 feet (6,100 m).

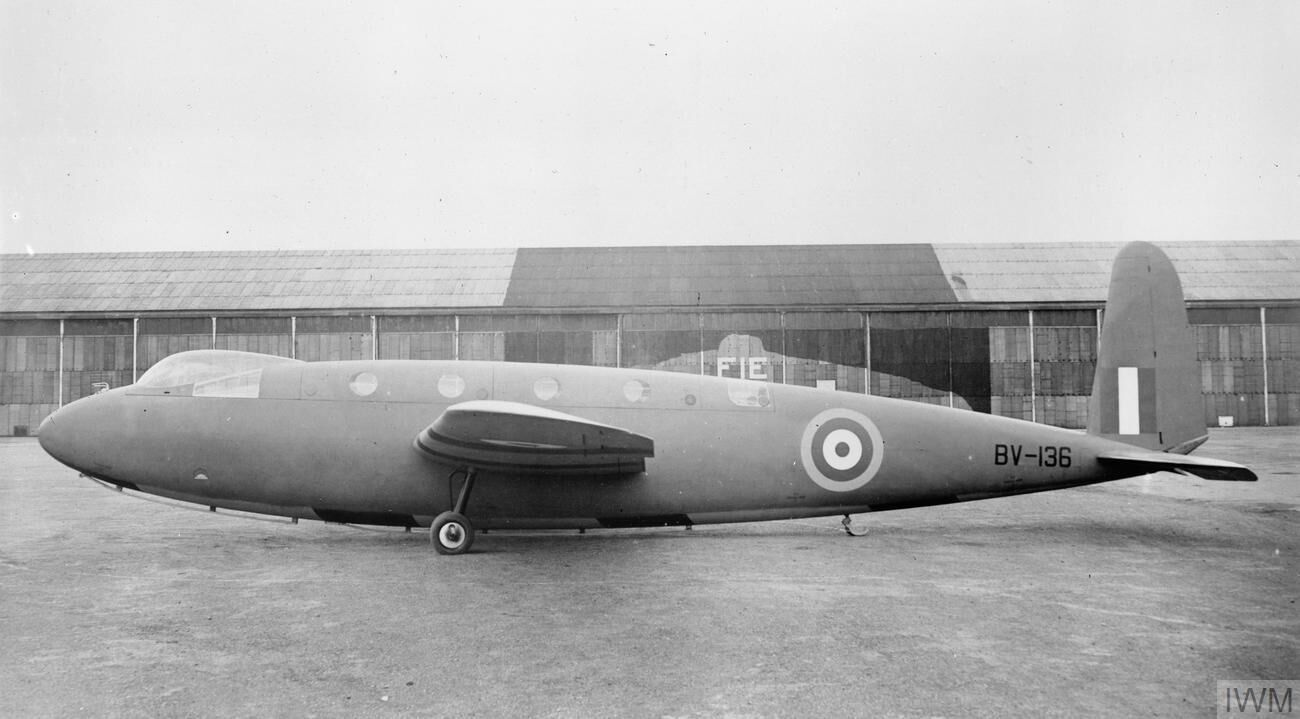
RAF Hotspur Mk I BV136, c. 1942

== Design ==
The GAL.48 was primarily designed by F.F. Crocombe (team leader) to the Air Ministry specification X.10/40, and was to be similar in design to the German DFS 230 assault glider which had been used in the Battle of the Netherlands. The first prototype of the glider, designated GAL.48 and which would receive the service name Hotspur Mk I, flew in November, only four months after General Aircraft Ltd had been given the requirement for the glider. An initial order of 400 Hotspurs was placed with General Aircraft Ltd in September by the Ministry of Aircraft Production, nearly two months before the prototype first flew.

The Hotspur Mark I was constructed from wood and was designed to accommodate eight fully armed airborne troops. Its wingspan was 62 feet (18.90 m) and it was 39 feet 3.5 inches (11.98 m) in length. With a full load (approximately 1,880 pounds (850 kg)), it weighed approximately 3,600 pounds (1,600 kg). The Mk I was distinguished from its other variants by the addition of cabin portholes along its fuselage, and hooks on the nose and tail to allow multiple Hotspurs to be towed together. The two pilots, and later the pilot and instructor when the Hotspurs were used as training gliders, sat in tandem in the cockpit. It had a jettisonable undercarriage, and its unusual fuselage functioned like a lid; once the Hotspur had landed, the troops inside would throw off the top half of the fuselage and then climb out of the lower half, much like leaving a small boat. A total of 18 Hotspur Mk Is were produced, 10 by GAl and eight by Slingsby Aircraft.

The first operational Hotspur arrived at the Central Landing Establishment between February and April 1941, (Note: Smith (p. 13) and other sources, e.g. Ringway state that the first Hotspur arrived at the CLE on 6 February 1941 while Otway (p. 30) states that it arrived in April 1941.) with 15 being delivered by 22 August. Towing trials began in February 1941 with a Boulton & Paul Overstrand bomber.

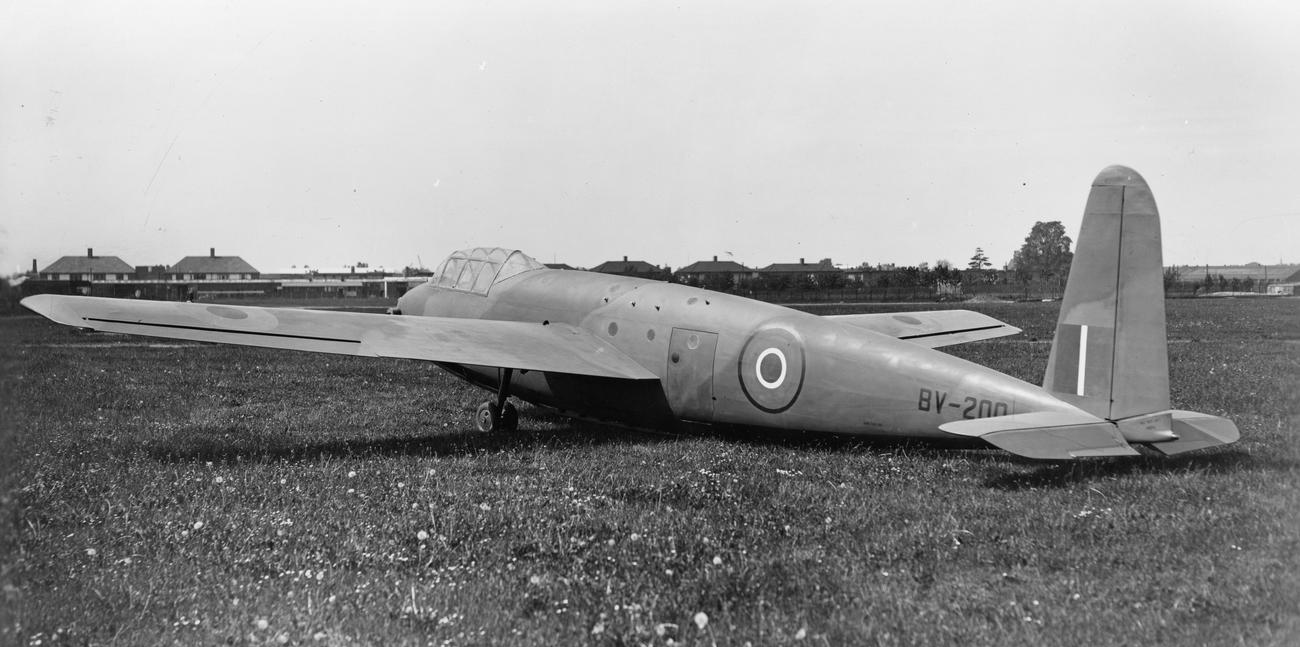
An Airspeed-built Hotspur Mk II BV200 about 1943

=== Further development ===
Even as the initial 400 gliders were being produced, several problems with the Hotspur's design were uncovered, the primary one being that the glider did not carry sufficient troops. Although it had been designed to transport eight airborne troops and a cargo of 1,880 pounds (850 kg), this was found to be inadequate. Tactically it was believed that airborne troops should be landed in groups far larger than eight, and the number of aircraft therefore required to tow the gliders needed to land larger groups would be unfeasible; there were also concerns that the gliders would have to be towed in tandem if used operationally, which would be extremely difficult during nighttime and through cloud formations. Its disappointing glide ratio was also a contributing factor to reevaluate the assault glider concept.

Due to the limitations inherent in the Hotspur design, the decision was made to continue with the development of several other types of gliders, including a 15-seater which would become the Airspeed Horsa and a tank-carrying glider, which would become the General Aircraft Hamilcar. The Hotspur remained in production primarily as a training aircraft and as a "stop-gap" in case the other programmes failed.

Three variants on the original Hotspur Mk I were created. The first was the heavily modified Mk II (Specification X.22/40 and X.23/40), which was redesigned partially to address changes in operational requirements and also to bolster the ground handling of the initial series of aircraft. In operations, rather than releasing the glider from a long distance away and allowing it to glide gently to the ground, it was decided that the towing aircraft would approach the landing zone and only then release the glider, requiring a more robust glider. The Hotspur Mk I wings had also shown considerable flex and the type had proved difficult to handle on the ground. In order to reduce stresses on the airframe, the fuselage was strengthened and wings were "shortened" by over eight ft each, resulting in a wingspan of 45 feet 10 3/4 inches (13.99 m) with the tips made square-cut and ailerons moved from the end of the wings to an inset position.

While maintaining its original all-wood construction and overall fuselage and empennage dimensions, the Mk II incorporated a modified fuselage which included altering the cockpit enclosure and a "deeper" canopy. Instead of using the "lid" (where the two pilots still boarded via the hinged perspex canopy), two side doors were added from which troops would enter and depart. The seating was re-arranged, and a braking parachute added to the rear. Its other dimensions remained the same, with a length of 39 feet 3.5 inches (11.98 m) and a gross weight of approximately 3,600 pounds (1,600 kg), with eight airborne troops and 1,880 pounds (850 kg) of equipment.

A total of 50 of the early-production Mk IIs were modified into trainers as the Mark III, by adding dual controls and instruments for the student pilot and an externally braced tailplane.

The third variant of the Hotspur was the GAL.48B "Twin Hotspur", which did not progress past the prototype phase. The Twin Hotspur was a 1942 attempt to create a glider capable of carrying 15 airborne troops as an interim glider until production of the Horsa reached sufficient levels. It was created by connecting two Hotspur fuselages together, using a constant-chord centre wing section of 12 feet (3.66 m) length, and a constant-chord tailplane. Two pilots sat tandem-style in the port fuselage. In August 1942, the sole "Twin Hotspur" prototype (MP486) underwent testing, towed behind an Armstrong Whitworth Whitley tug. The project was abandoned before production could begin, primarily because the glider's flight characteristics were criticised by its pilots.

=== Production ===
When Hotspur production ended in early 1943, a total of 1,015 gliders had been produced. The primary sub-contractor, Harris Lebus was responsible for 996 Mk IIs and Mk IIIs while the parent company produced only 10 Mk Is and a single Mk II prototype. Slingsby was the only other sub-contractor involved in production with eight Mk Is completed.

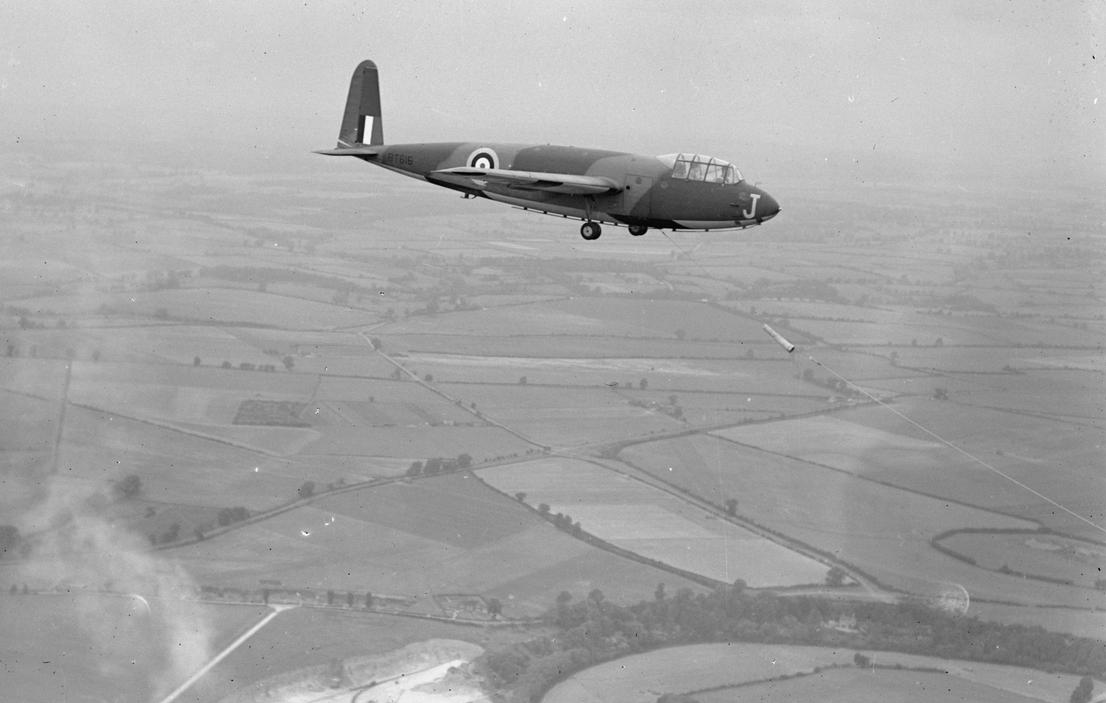
Hotspur Mk III used by Glider Pilot Exercise Unit

== Operational history ==
Due to changing operational requirements, no Hotspurs were used in combat operations, and were instead exclusively used for training purposes; it was the glider in which all pilots belonging to the Glider Pilot Regiment received their initial instruction. Although relatively heavy with a high sink rate, the Hotspur exhibited good flying characteristics and could even be flown aerobatically, allowing novice pilots to quickly gain proficiency. The first glider pilots were curiously named "glider coxswains".

Glider pilots first trained at an Elementary Flying Training School on de Havilland Tiger Moths or Miles Magisters before converting to glider training. At the Glider Schools, a Hotspur MK III was first employed for dual instruction with the rear seats weighted for ballast and only the instructor and student aboard. The gliders were usually towed by Hawker Hector or Hawker Audax biplanes (later Miles Master and Westland Lysander "tugs") during training. From 8 to 11 dual-instruction flights usually preceded the student's first solo flight. At Operational Training Glider Schools, the flights were made with troops instead of ballast in Hotspur MK IIs. Release at high altitudes and night-flying was also part of the training.

A total of 250 Hotspurs were retained for operational use if they were required, but the rest were used as training gliders. In 1942, 22 Hotspur Mk IIs were sent to Canada, eventually six were redeployed to the United States Navy and one to the United States Army Air Forces.

In the build-up to Operation Overlord in early 1944, a scheme was considered in which Hotspurs would have been used to transport cargo and equipment. A Canadian fighter squadron – 401 Squadron – was selected for trials, the intention was to enable faster redeployment of fighter squadrons by using gliders to carry spare pilots, ground crew and essential supplies. The squadron operated the Supermarine Spitfire IX, some of which were modified to tow gliders by means of a tow-point attached to the tail wheel; some pilots were trained to fly the Hotspur, including fighter ace Don C. Laubman. The Spitfires were found to be reasonably effective as glider tugs, although their engines were prone to overheating because the glider's maximum tow speed was 160 miles per hour (260 km/h), comparatively slow for a Spitfire. Despite this, the scheme was judged to be practical, although it never saw operational use.

At war's end, the type was retired and few Hotspurs were preserved for display.

== Variants ==
Hotspur Mk I
Single prototype, production run of 18 aircraft
Hotspur Mk II
Production series, modified with reduced wingspan, inset ailerons, new seating arrangement, deeper cockpit canopy, side doors, braking parachute; fuselage strengthened
Hotspur Mk III
Production series, dual controls and instruments, external tailplane bracing
Twin Hotspur
Two standard Hotspur fuselages and outer wing panels joined together with common centre section and tailplane; single prototype made. This variant did not enter series production.

== Operators ==
RCAF Hotspur Mk II, c. 1942

Canada

- Royal Canadian Air Force

United Kingdom

- British Army
- Royal Air Force

United States

- United States Army Air Forces
- United States Navy

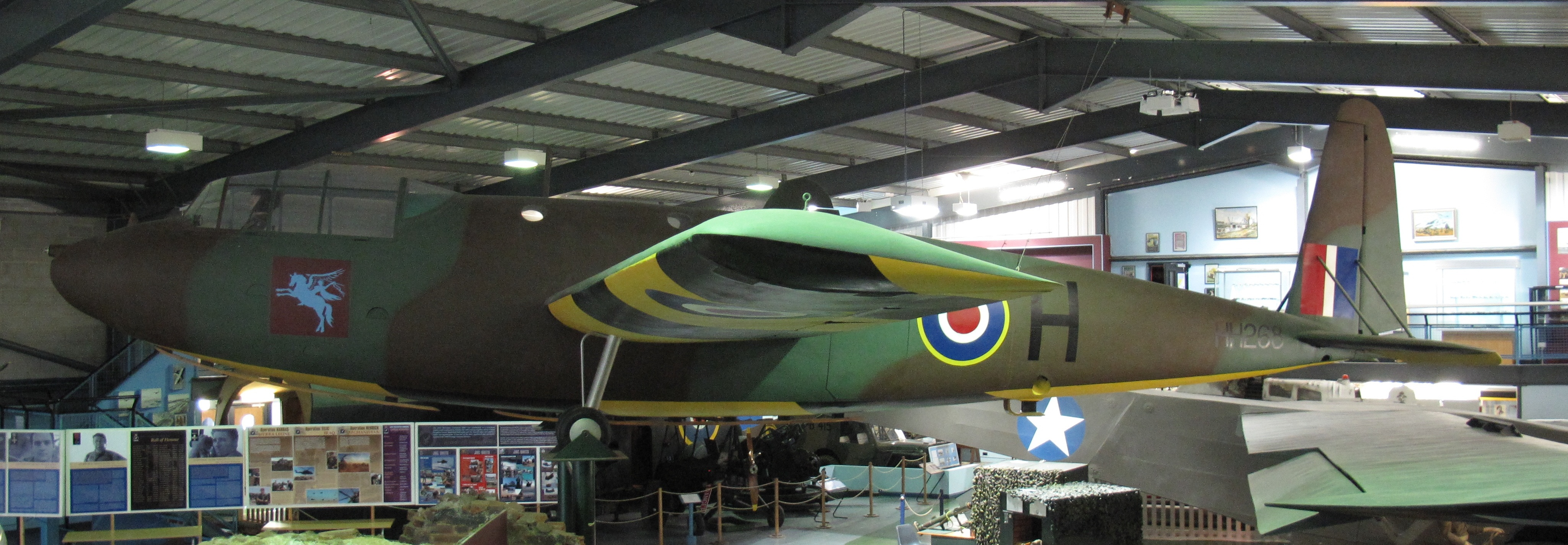
Replica General Aircraft Hotspur at the Museum of Army Flying

== Survivors and replicas ==
A Hotspur Mark II (HH268) replica is on display at the Museum of Army Flying in Hampshire, England. The front fuselage of a Hotspur was preserved at the Parachute Regiment And Airborne Forces Museum in Aldershot prior to the museum's 2007 closing, in anticipation of a move to the Imperial War Museum Duxford.

== Specifications (Hotspur Mk II) ==
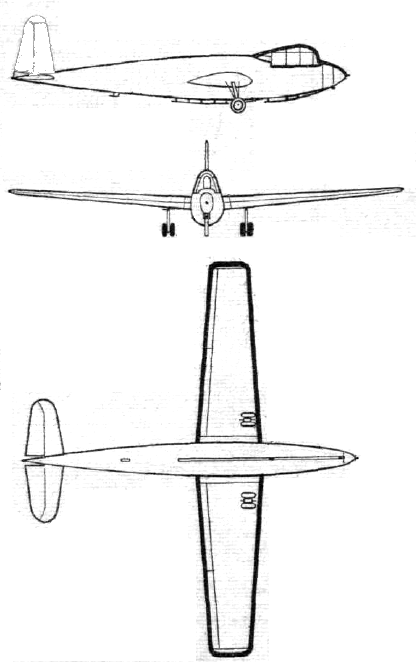
General Aircraft G.A.L. 48 Hotspur 3-view drawing

Data from The Encyclopedia of Weapons of World War II

General characteristics

- Crew: 2
- Capacity: 8 troops
- Length: 39 ft 0 in (11.89 m)
- Wingspan: 45 ft 10.75 in (13.99 m)
- Height: 10 ft 0 in (3.05 m)
- Wing area: 272 sq ft (25.3 m^{2})
- Empty weight: 1,661 lb (753 kg)
- Max takeoff weight: 3,598 lb (1,632 kg)

Performance

- Maximum speed: 90 mph (145 km/h, 78 kn)
- Landing speed: 56 mph (90 km/h)
- Range: 83 mi (134 km, 72 nmi) from a 20,000 ft (6,100 m) release
- Wing loading: 13.23 lb/sq ft (64.6 kg/m^{2})

== See also ==
Aircraft of comparable role, configuration, and era

- Airspeed Horsa
- DFS 230
- General Aircraft Hamilcar
- Slingsby Hengist
- Waco CG-4A

Related lists

- List of aircraft of the Army Air Corps (United Kingdom)
- List of aircraft of the Royal Air Force
- List of World War II military gliders
