= Slingsby Hengist =

Military aircraft

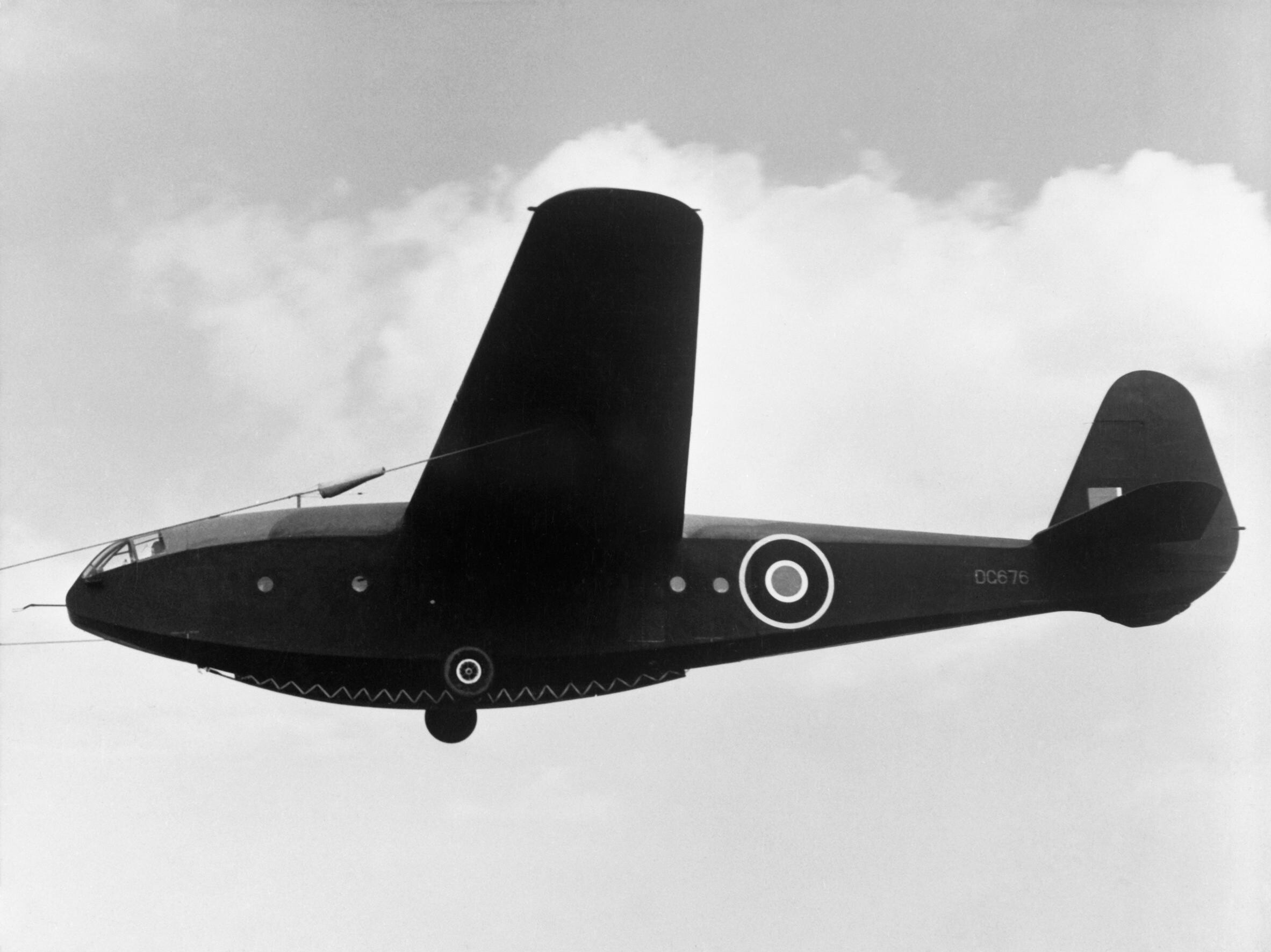
- Slingsby T.18 Hengist Mark I (DG676), on tow while with the Airborne Forces Experimental Establishment based at Sherburn-in-Elmet, Yorkshire, 25 April 1943

General information
- Type: Troop-carrying glider
- Manufacturer: Slingsby Sailplanes
- Designer: John Frost
- Number built: 18

History
- Manufactured: 1942–1944
- First flight: January 1942
- Retired: 1946

The Slingsby Hengist was a British military glider designed and built by Slingsby Sailplanes Ltd. Like other British troop-carrying gliders in the Second World War, it was named after military figures whose name began with H, in this case the Jute invader Hengist.

== Design and development ==
The use of assault gliders by the British was prompted by the use by Germany of the DFS 230 transport glider, which was first used in May 1940 to land assault troops on the Eben Emael fort in Belgium. Their advantage compared to parachute assault was that the troops landed in one place, rather than being dispersed.

The Slingsby T.18 Hengist was designed by John "Jack" Frost. It was a 15-seat glider designed to meet Specification X.25/40 (in accordance to O.R.98), issued in February 1941. The specification was issued in case sufficiently powerful tugs were not available for the larger Airspeed Horsa. Four prototypes were ordered in late 1940, with the first prototype DG570 flying in January 1942, towed by an Armstrong Whitworth Whitley.

In total, 14 production Hengist Mk Is were delivered to the Royal Air Force (RAF) between February 1943 and March 1944. One of Frost's unique design touches was to fit the Hengist with a rubber bag as a landing device. A strengthened undercarriage was used on the production aircraft and was called the Mk III, but this name was not carried over to the RAF.

The Hengist had a distinctive appearance with curved upper and lower surfaces and a flat-sided fuselage.

== Operational history ==
Two Hengist Mk Is were delivered to the Glider Pilots' Exercise Unit, while others were issued to experimental units or remained in storage. Production was halted when Waco Hadrian gliders became available under Lend-Lease. As a back-up type, it saw no operational service and was phased out of service in 1946.

== Specifications (Hengist Mk I) ==
Data from Slingsby Sailplanes, British Gliders and Sailplanes 1922–1970

General characteristics

- Crew: 1
- Capacity: 14
- Length: 56 ft 6 in (17.22 m)
- Wingspan: 80 ft 0 in (24.38 m)
- Wing area: 780.0 sq ft (72.46 m^{2})
- Aspect ratio: 8.2
- Airfoil: NACA 2415 (root), NACA 4412 (tip)
- Empty weight: 4,630 lb (2,100 kg)
- Gross weight: 8,351 lb (3,788 kg)

Performance

- Stall speed: 48 mph (77 km/h, 42 kn)
- Towing speed: 130 mph (209 km/h)
- Lift-to-drag: 14:1
- Wing loading: 10.7 lb/sq ft (52.3 kg/m^{2})

== See also ==
Aircraft of comparable role, configuration, and era

- Airspeed Horsa
- DFS 230
- General Aircraft Hamilcar
- General Aircraft Hotspur
- Gotha Go 242
- Waco CG-4A

Related lists

- List of aircraft of World War II
- List of aircraft of the Army Air Corps (United Kingdom)
- List of aircraft of the Royal Air Force
- List of aircraft of the United Kingdom in World War II
- List of World War II military gliders
