= DFS 230 =

German WWII transport glider

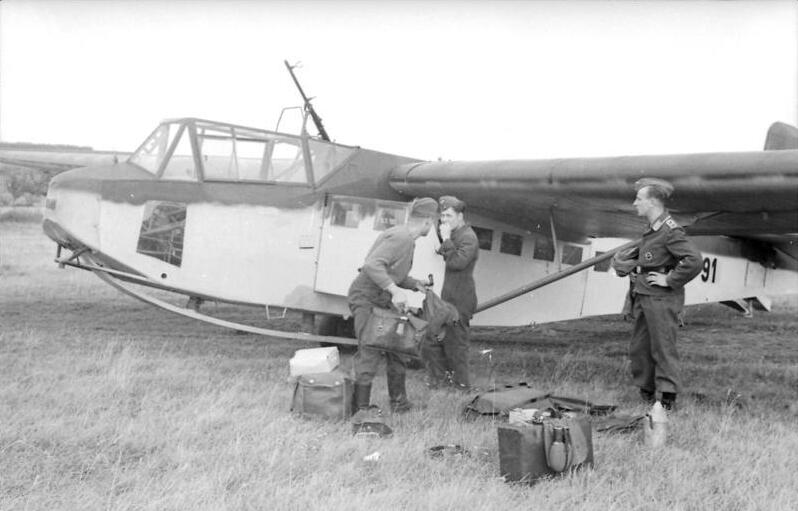
- Luftwaffe soldiers loading the DFS 230 in preparation for deployment.

General information
- Type: Troop glider
- Manufacturer: DFS
- Designer: Hans Jacobs
- Primary user: Luftwaffe
- Number built: 1,600+

History
- Manufactured: 1939-1943
- Introduction date: 1939
- First flight: 1937
- Retired: 1945

The DFS 230 was a German transport glider operated by the Luftwaffe in World War II. It was developed in 1933 by the Deutsche Forschungsanstalt für Segelflug (DFS - "German Research Institute for Sailplane Flight") with Hans Jacobs as the head designer. The glider was the German inspiration for the British Hotspur glider and was intended for airborne assault operations.

In addition to the pilot, the DFS-230 glider had room for nine men who sat close together on a narrow bench located in the middle of the fuselage (six facing forward, and four backward). Entry and exit to the cramped interior was by a single side door. The front passenger could operate its only armament, a machine gun. It was an assault glider, designed to land directly on top of its target, so it was equipped with a parachute brake. This allowed the glider to approach its target in a dive at an angle of eighty degrees and land within 20 metres (60 ft) of its target. It could carry up to 1,200 kg (2,600 lb) of cargo.

It played significant roles in the operations at Fort Eben-Emael, the Battle of Crete, and in the rescue of Benito Mussolini. It was also used in North Africa. However, it was used chiefly in supplying encircled forces on the Eastern Front such as supplying the Demyansk Pocket, the Kholm Pocket, Stalingrad, and the defenders of Festung Budapest (until February 12, 1945). Although production ceased in 1943, it was used right up to the end of the war, for instance, supplying Berlin and Breslau until May 1945.

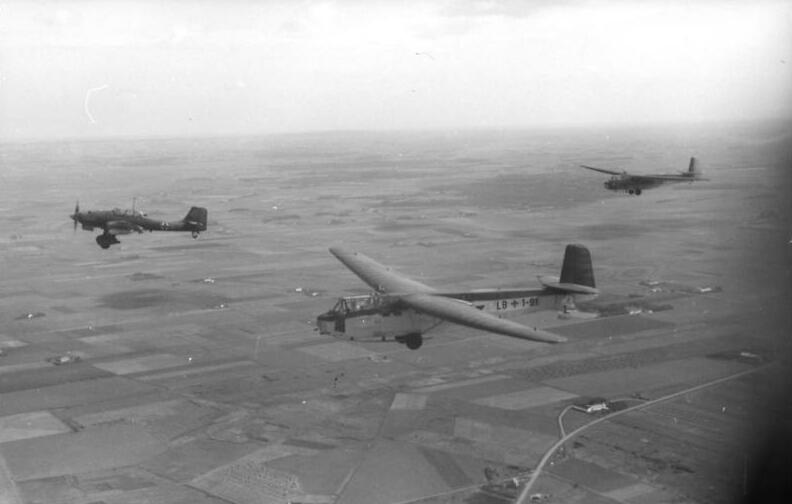
Two DFS 230s flying over Italy, towed by a pair of Junkers Ju 87B tugs

By means of a cable running along the tow rope the pilots of the tow-plane and of the freight glider were able to communicate with each other which made blind flying possible, when necessary. The towing speed of the DFS-230 was approximately 190 km/h (116 mph). It dropped its landing gear as soon as it was safely in the air, and landed by means of a landing skid. The DFS-230 could be towed by a Ju 52 (which could tow two with difficulty), a He 111, a Ju 87, Hs 126, a Bf 110, or a Bf 109. The Ju 52 towed the glider using a 40 metres (131 ft) cable or, in bad weather, a much shorter rigid bar connected by an articulated joint to the tow aircraft. The DFS-230 had the highest glide ratio (8:1) of any World War 2 military glider other than the Antonov A-7. This was because it was thought that the glider had to be capable of a long approach during landing, so that it could be released a greater distance from the target so the sound of the towing aircraft did not alert the enemy.

== Variants ==
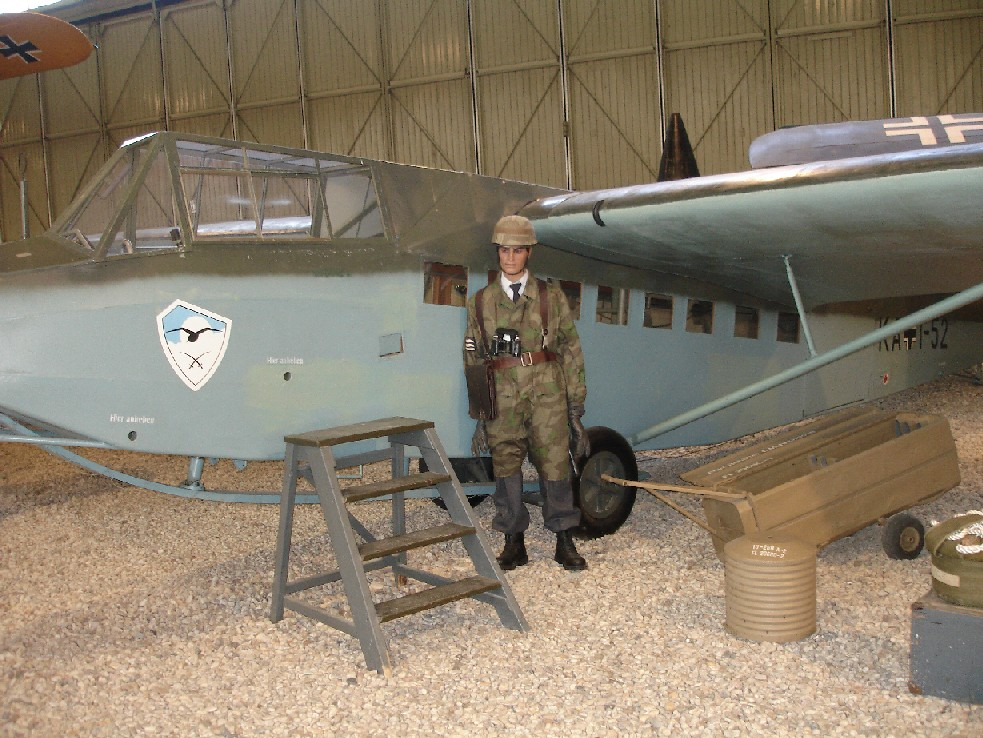
DFS 230-A at Luftwaffenmuseum der Bundeswehr

DFS 230 A-1
Initial production version

DFS 230 A-2
A-1 with dual-controls

DFS 230 B-1
Braking parachute added, able to carry defensive armament (MG 34 machine gun)

DFS 230 B-2
B-1 with dual-controls

DFS 230 C-1
Late production version; B-1 with nose braking rockets

DFS 230 D-1
C-1 with improved nose braking rocket design, one prototype (DFS 230 V6)

DFS 230 F-1
Larger version with capacity for 15 soldiers, one prototype (DFS 230 V7, DV+AV)

DFS 203
Two DFS 230 fuselages joined by an enlarged cantilever centre section, with span of 27.6 m (91 ft) and length of 12.1 m (40 ft) due to the rear fuselage being extended. Wind tunnel testing revealed little or no advantage over the standard DFS 230 so further work was abandoned.

Focke-Achgelis Fa 225
A single DFS 230 converted to an auto-gyro by replacing the wings with the 3-bladed rotor from a Focke-Achgelis Fa 223, mounted on a pylon above the fuselage. The undercarriage was revised to include long oleo shock absorbers with a wide track for stability. Towed behind a Junkers Ju 52/3m during trials, it was found that the low towing speed and low approach speed made the combination more vulnerable to attack.

== Specifications (DFS 230 B-1) ==

Data from Aircraft of the Third Reich, German Aircraft of the Second World War

General characteristics

- Crew: 1
- Capacity: 9 equipped troops + 270 kg (600 lb) cargo
- Length: 11.24 m (36 ft 11 in)
- Wingspan: 21.98 m (72 ft 1 in)
- Height: 2.74 m (9 ft 0 in)
- Wing area: 41.3 m^{2} (445 sq ft)
- Empty weight: 860 kg (1,896 lb)
- Gross weight: 2,040 kg (4,497 lb)
- Max takeoff weight: 2,100 kg (4,630 lb)

Performance

- Never exceed speed: 290 km/h (180 mph, 160 kn)
- Maximum towing speed: 209 km/h (130 mph)
- Normal towing speed: 180 km/h (112 mph)
- Maximum glide ratio: 1:18 (empty), 1:11 (fully loaded)

Armament

- Guns:

Optional

- 1 x 7.92 mm (0.312 in) MG 15 machine gun on a manually aimed mounting aft of the cockpit
- 2 x 7.92 mm (0.312 in) MG 34 fixed forward firing machine guns attached to the forward fuselage sides.

== See also ==
- Hanna Reitsch

Related development

- Gotha Go 242

Aircraft of comparable role, configuration, and era

- Waco CG-4A
- General Aircraft Hotspur
- Airspeed Horsa
- Slingsby Hengist
- Gribovski G-11
- Antonov A-7

Related lists

- List of aircraft of World War II
- List of military aircraft of Germany
- List of World War II military aircraft of Germany
- List of gliders
