= List of military transport aircraft =

Military transport aircraft include load-carrying non-combat types such as freight and troop carriers, as well as some other specialised types, used by military forces around the world.

== In production ==
Type	Country	Class	Role	Date	Payload (t)	Range (km)	Notes
AgustaWestland AW109	Italy	Rotorcraft		1976	0.680	920	
AgustaWestland AW101/EH-101	Italy; United Kingdom	Rotorcraft		1999	5.5	833	
AgustaWestland AW139	Italy	Rotorcraft		2003	1.575	1,250	
AgustaWestland AW149	Italy	Rotorcraft		2003		800	
AgustaWestland AW159 Wildcat	United Kingdom	Rotorcraft		2014	1.5	777	
AgustaWestland CH-149 Cormorant	Italy; United Kingdom	Rotorcraft		2000	8.5	833	
Airbus A330 MRTT	Europe	Jet	Strategic / tanker	2007	45	14,800	
Airbus A400M	Europe	Propeller	Strategic / Tactical	2009	37	6,400	
Alenia C-27J Spartan	Italy	Propeller	Tactical	2008	11.5	5,926	
Antonov An-72 Coaler	Ukraine	Jet	Tactical	1977	10	4,325	
Antonov An-178	Ukraine	Jet	Tactical	2015	18	5,500	
Antonov An-132	Ukraine	Propeller	Tactical	2016	9.2	4,400	Project suspended
Bell UH-1Y Venom	US	Rotorcraft		2008	3		
Bell Boeing V-22 Osprey	US	Rotorcraft	Tactical	1989	6.8	1,627	
Boeing C-17 Globemaster III	US	Jet	Strategic / Tactical	1991	77.5	10,390	
Boeing C-40 Clipper	US	Jet	VIP	2001	18	5,600	
Boeing KC-767	US	Jet	Strategic / tanker	2005	29.5	11,830	
Boeing KC-46 Pegasus	US	Jet	Strategic / tanker	2013	29.5	11,830	
CASA CN-235	Spain; Indonesia	Propeller	Tactical	1983	5	5,003	
EADS CASA C-295	Spain; Indonesia; India	Propeller	Tactical	1998	9.3	5,400	
Changhe Z-18	China	Rotorcraft		2014	5	1,020	
Embraer KC-390	Brazil	Jet	Tactical	2014	23	5,820	
Eurocopter AS532 Cougar	France	Rotorcraft		1978	1.5	572	
Eurocopter AS565 Panther	France	Rotorcraft		1986	2	572	
Eurocopter EC225 Super Puma/Airbus Helicopters H225	France	Rotorcraft		2004	5.5	857	
Eurocopter EC725/Airbus Helicopters H225M	France	Rotorcraft		2005	5.5	857	
Harbin Y-12	China	Propeller	Tactical / Utility	1983		1,340	
Harbin Z-9	China	Rotorcraft		1994	1.5	572	
HESA Simourgh	Iran	Propeller		2023	6	900	
Ilyushin Il-76 Candid	Russia	Jet	Strategic / Tactical	1971	47	4,400	
Ilyushin Il-112	Russia	Propeller	Tactical	2011	5.9	5,000	
Kawasaki C-2	Japan	Jet	Tactical	2010	37.6	6,500	
Lockheed Martin C-130J Super Hercules	US	Propeller	Tactical / tanker	1996	19-20	3,334	
Mil Mi-8	Russia	Rotorcraft		1967	4	610	
Mil Mi-17	Russia	Rotorcraft		1977	4	610	
Mil Mi-26	Russia	Rotorcraft		1977	20	800	
NHIndustries NH90	EU	Rotorcraft		2007	2.5	800	
Shaanxi Y-8	China	Propeller	Tactical	1974	20	5,616	
Shaanxi Y-9	China	Propeller	Tactical	2008	25	2,200	
Sikorsky UH-60 Black Hawk	US	Rotorcraft		1979	4	590	
Xian Y-20	China	Jet	Strategic / Tactical	2013	66	7,800	

== In service / Out of production ==
Type	Country	Class	Role	Date	Payload (t)	Range (km)	Notes
Aérospatiale SA 330 Puma	France	Rotorcraft		1968	3 (Internal)/4.5(External)	580	
Airbus A310 MRTT	EU	Jet	Strategic / tanker	2003	36	6,500	
Antonov An-2 Colt	USSR	Propeller	Tactical	1947	2	845	
Antonov An-12 Cub	USSR	Propeller	Tactical	1959	20	5,700	
Antonov An-22 Antei	USSR	Propeller	Strategic / Tactical	1965	80	5,000	
Antonov An-26 Curl	USSR	Propeller	Tactical	1969	5.5	2,550	
Antonov An-28 Cash	USSR	Propeller	Tactical / Utility	1986	2.5	1,500	
Antonov An-32 Cline	USSR	Propeller	Tactical	1976	6.7	2,500	
Antonov An-70	Ukraine	Jet	Strategic / Tactical	1994	47	6,600	
Antonov An-124 Ruslan	USSR	Jet	Strategic	1982	150	5,410	
BAe 146	UK	Jet	Strategic / Tactical	1981			
Beechcraft C-12 Huron	US	Propeller	Tactical / Utility	1974	2.1	2,900	
Bell UH-1 Iroquois	US	Rotorcraft		1959	1.7	507	
Bell UH-1N Twin Huey	US	Rotorcraft		1970		460	
Boeing Vertol CH-46 Sea Knight	US	Rotorcraft		1964	2.2	1,020	
Boeing Vertol CH-47 Chinook	US	Rotorcraft		1962	11	370	
Britten-Norman BN-2 Islander	UK	Propeller	Tactical / Utility	1965	2	1,400	
CASA C-212 Aviocar	Indonesia; Spain	Propeller	Tactical / Utility	1971	2.8	1,433	
Changhe Z-8	China	Rotorcraft		1994	5	1,020	
de Havilland Canada DHC-6 Twin Otter	Canada	Propeller	Tactical / Utility	1966		1,434	
Eurocopter AS365 Dauphin	France	Rotorcraft		1978	1.5	572	
Fokker F27 Friendship	Netherlands	Propeller	Tactical	1958		2,055	
Fokker 50	Netherlands	Propeller	Tactical	1985		1,666	
IAR 330	Romania	Rotorcraft		1975		572	
Kawasaki C-1	Japan	Jet	Tactical	1970	11.9	1,300	
Lockheed C-130 Hercules	US	Propeller	Tactical / tanker	1954	20.4	3,800	
Lockheed C-5M Galaxy	US	Jet	Strategic	1968	127.4	9,000 (Note: this range can be extended with aerial refuelling)	
McDonnell Douglas KC-10 Extender	US	Jet	Strategic / tanker	1980	76.5	18,000 (Note: total fuel capacity 160,200kg could permit range well in excess of 18,000km (with reduced payload))	
Short C-23 Sherpa	UK	Propeller	Tactical / Utility	1982	3.2	1,239	
Sikorsky CH-53 Sea Stallion	US	Rotorcraft		1966	3.6	1,000	
Westland Lynx	UK	Rotorcraft		1978	1.5	528	
Westland Sea King / Commando	UK	Rotorcraft	Tactical	1969		1,230	

== Retired ==
Type	Country	Class	Role	Date	Payload (t)	Range (km)	Notes
Aeritalia G.222	Italy	Propeller	Tactical	1978	9	1,371	
Aérospatiale SA 321 Super Frelon	France	Rotorcraft		1966	5	1,020	
AGO Ao 192	Germany	Propeller	VIP/Comms	1935	(6 pax)	1,360	Six built
Airspeed AS.6 Envoy	UK	Propeller	VIP/Comms	1934	(6 pax)	1,050	approx 15-25 saw military service
Airspeed AS.10 Oxford	UK	Propeller	Light transport/Comms	1937	(6 pax)	1,400	8,851 built (mostly as trainers)
Airspeed Horsa	UK	Glider	Tactical	1941			
Antonov A-7	USSR	Glider	Tactical	1941	0.9		
Antonov An-8 Camp	USSR	Propeller	Tactical	1958	11	2,780	
Antonov An-10 Cat	USSR	Propeller	Tactical	1959	8.4	4,075	
Antonov An-14 Clod	USSR	Propeller	Tactical / Utility	1966	7	650	
Arado Ar 232	Germany	Propeller	Tactical	1943	4.5	1,062	
Armstrong Whitworth Argosy	UK	Propeller	Strategic / Tactical	1960	13	5,552	
Armstrong Whitworth Albemarle	UK	Propeller	Tactical	1943	2	2,100	
Armstrong Whitworth Awana	UK	Propeller	Strategic	1923		580	Prototype
Atlas Oryx	South Africa	Rotorcraft		1987		303	
Avro Andover	UK	Propeller	Strategic	1924		740	
Avro York	UK	Propeller	Strategic / Tactical	1944	9.1	4,800	
Bloch MB.220	France	Propeller	Tactical	1939		1,400	
Blackburn Beverley	UK	Propeller	Strategic / Tactical	1955	20	2,000	
Blohm & Voss BV 144	Germany	Propeller		1944		1,550	
Blohm & Voss BV 222 Wiking	Germany	Propeller		1940		6,100	Flying boat
Blohm & Voss Ha 139	Germany	Propeller		1936		4,600	Prototype
Boeing C-73	US	Propeller	Strategic / Tactical	1942		1,200	
Boeing C-75 Stratoliner	US	Propeller	Strategic / VIP	1942	3.6	2,820	
Boeing C-108 Flying Fortress	US	Propeller	Strategic / Tactical	1943	5	3,219	Prototype
Boeing C-97 Stratofreighter	US	Propeller	Strategic / tanker	1951	9.1	6,920	
Boeing YC-14	US	Jet	Tactical	1976	31.4	5,136	Prototype
Bristol Bombay	UK	Propeller	Tactical	1935	7	1,416	Dual purpose bomber/transport
Bristol Britannia	UK	Propeller	Strategic	1957	18.5	7,130	
Bristol Freighter	UK	Propeller	Strategic	1945	7.3 (Mk31)	1,320	
Canadair North Star	Canada	Propeller	Strategic / Tactical	1946	5	6,212	
Canadair CL-44/CC-106 Yukon	Canada	Propeller	Strategic / Tactical	1960		8,990	
Canadair CC-109 Cosmopolitan	Canada	Propeller	Tactical	1960	6.4	3,660	
Caproni Ca.122	Italy	Propeller	Tactical	1934		1,500	
Caproni Ca.133	Italy	Propeller	Tactical	1935		1,350	
Consolidated C-87 Liberator Express	US	Propeller	Strategic / Tactical	1942	4.5	5,311	
Consolidated R2Y	US	Propeller	Strategic / Tactical	1944	5.5	6,400	Prototype
Convair XC-99	US	Propeller	Strategic	1949	45	13,041	Prototype
Convair C-131 Samaritan	US	Propeller	Tactical	1950		750	
Curtiss C-46 Commando	US	Propeller	Strategic / Tactical	1941	6.8	5,069	
Curtiss C-76 Caravan	US	Propeller	Tactical	1943	3.6	1,210	
de Havilland DH.104 Dove	UK	Propeller	VIP	1936	1	1,420	
de Havilland DH.114 Heron	UK	Propeller	VIP	1950		1,473	
de Havilland Canada DHC-4 Caribou	Canada	Propeller	Tactical	1958	3.6	2,103	
de Havilland Canada DHC-5 Buffalo	Canada	Propeller	Tactical	1965	8.2	1,112	
DFS 230	Germany	Glider	Tactical	1937			
DFS 331	Germany	Glider	Tactical	1940	2.3		Prototype
Dornier Do 19	Germany	Propeller	Strategic	1936		1,600	
Douglas C-1	US	Propeller	Tactical	1926	1	620	
Douglas DC-2/C-32	US	Propeller	Strategic / Tactical	1937		1,750	
Douglas C-47 Skytrain	US	Propeller	Strategic / Tactical	1941	3	2,600	
Douglas C-54 Skymaster	US	Propeller	Strategic / Tactical	1942		6,400	
Douglas C-74 Globemaster	US	Propeller	Strategic	1945	22	5,470	
Douglas C-47 Skytrain/C-117 Skytrain	US	Propeller	Strategic / Tactical	1951	3	2,600	
Douglas C-118 Liftmaster	US	Propeller	Strategic / Tactical	1947	12.7	6,700	
Douglas C-124 Globemaster II	US	Propeller	Strategic	1950	34	10,975	
Douglas C-133 Cargomaster	US	Propeller	Strategic	1956	53.5	6,590	
Fairchild C-82 Packet	US	Propeller	Tactical	1944	12.5	6,239	
Fairchild C-119 Flying Boxcar	US	Propeller	Tactical	1949	12.5	2,849	
Fairchild C-123 Provider	US	Propeller	Tactical	1949	11	1,666	
Fairey Gannet COD.4	UK	Propeller	Carrier Onboard Delivery	1949			
Focke-Achgelis Fa 223 Drache	Germany	Rotorcraft	Tactical	1940		700	
Focke-Achgelis Fa 225	Germany	Rotorcraft	Tactical	1943			Prototype
Focke-Wulf Fw 200 Condor	Germany	Propeller	Strategic / Tactical	1937		3,560	
Fokker Y1C	US	Propeller	Tactical	1931		1,100	
General Aircraft Hamilcar	UK	Glider	Tactical	1942	7		
General Aircraft Hotspur	UK	Glider	Tactical	1940			
Gotha Go 146	Germany	Propeller		1936		1,000	
Gotha Go 242	Germany	Glider		1941	4		
Gotha Go 244	Germany	Propeller		1941		600	
Gotha Go 345	Germany	Glider		1944	4.5		Prototype
Gotha Ka 430	Germany	Glider		1943	1.7		Prototype
Grumman C-1 Trader	US	Propeller	Carrier Onboard Delivery	1952	1.6	2,092	
Grumman C-2 Greyhound	US	Propeller	Carrier Onboard Delivery	1964	4.5	2,400	
Handley Page Clive	UK	Propeller	Strategic	1931		1,240	
Handley Page Halifax	UK	Propeller	Strategic/Tactical	1940	3.6	2,990	
Handley Page Hastings	UK	Propeller	Strategic / Tactical	1948	9	2,720	
Handley Page H.P.51	UK	Propeller	Strategic	1935		1,530	
Hawker Siddeley Andover	UK	Propeller	Strategic / Tactical	1963	6.5	2,295	
Heinkel He 70	Germany	Propeller		1932		1,820	
Ilyushin Il-12 Coach	Russia	Propeller	Tactical	1946		1,500	
Ilyushin Il-14 Crate	Russia	Propeller	Tactical	1954		1,300	
Ilyushin Il-18 Coot	USSR	Propeller		1957		6,500	
Junkers Ju 52	Germany	Propeller	Strategic / Tactical	1930	2	800	
Junkers Ju 89	Germany	Propeller	Strategic / Tactical	1938	1.5	2,980	Prototype
Junkers Ju 90	Germany	Propeller	Strategic / Tactical	1937		1,247	
Junkers Ju 252	Germany	Propeller	Strategic / Tactical	1942		3,981	
Junkers Ju 290	Germany	Propeller	Strategic / Tactical	1942	3	6,150	
Junkers Ju 322	Germany	Glider		1941	20		Prototype
Junkers Ju 352	Germany	Propeller	Strategic / Tactical	1943		1,800	
Junkers Ju 390	Germany	Propeller	Strategic	1943		9,700	Prototype
Junkers W 34	Germany	Propeller	Tactical	1926		900	
Kawasaki Ki-56	Japan	Propeller	Strategic / Tactical	1940		3,300	
Lisunov Li-2	USSR	Propeller	Strategic / Tactical	1939	3	2,600	
Lockheed Model 18 Lodestar	US	Propeller	Strategic / Tactical	1940		4,025	
Lockheed C-69 Constellation	US	Propeller	Strategic / Tactical	1943		3,900	
Lockheed C-121 Constellation	US	Propeller	Strategic / Tactical	1948		4,445	
Lockheed R6V Constitution	US	Propeller	Strategic	1946		8,670	Prototype
Lockheed C-141 Starlifter	US	Jet	Strategic / Tactical	1963	28.4	9,880	
Lockheed TriStar (RAF)	US	Jet	Strategic / tanker	1984		7,785	
McDonnell Douglas C-9	US	Jet	Strategic	1968		4,700	
McDonnell Douglas YC-15	US	Jet	Tactical	1975	35	4,810	Prototype
Messerschmitt Me 321	Germany	Glider	Strategic / Tactical	1941	20		
Messerschmitt Me 323	Germany	Propeller	Strategic / Tactical	1943	10	800	
Mil Mi-4 Hound	USSR	Rotorcraft	Tactical	1952	1.6	500	
Mil Mi-6 Hook	USSR	Rotorcraft		1957	12 (internal), 8 (external)	970	
Mitsubishi Ki-57	Japan	Propeller	Strategic / Tactical	1942		3,000	
Mitsubish MC-20	Japan	Propeller	Strategic	1944		2,700	
Myasishchev VM-T	USSR	Jet	Strategic	1981	45	3,565	
Nakajima Ki-34	Japan	Propeller	Strategic / Tactical	1937		1,200	
Nanchang Y-5	China	Propeller	Tactical / Utility	1957	1,500	300	
Percival Pembroke	UK	Propeller	Communications / Utility	1952		1,660	
Piasecki H-16 Transporter	US	Rotorcraft		1953		348	Prototype
Piasecki H-21	US	Rotorcraft		1952		427	
PZL M-28 Skytruck	Poland	Propeller	Tactical / Utility	1993	2.5	1,500	
Nord Noratlas	France	Propeller	Tactical	1953	12.5	2,500	
Savoia-Marchetti SM.81	Italy	Propeller	Strategic / Tactical	1935	2	1,500	
Scottish Aviation Pioneer	UK	Propeller	Tactical	1947		680	
Scottish Aviation Twin Pioneer	UK	Propeller	Tactical	1955	2	1,287	
Short Belfast	UK	Propeller	Strategic	1964	55	8,528	
Short Skyvan	UK	Propeller	Tactical / Utility	1963	5	1,117	
Short Stirling	UK	Propeller	Tactical	1940	6.4	3750	
Showa/Nakajima L2D	Japan	Propeller	Strategic / Tactical	1939	3	2,600	
Siebel Fh 104	Germany	Propeller		1937		1,000	
Sikorsky CH-37 Mojave	US	Rotorcraft		1956	3	233	
Sikorsky CH-54 Tarhe	US	Rotorcraft		1962	9.1	370	
Slingsby Hengist	UK	Glider	Tactical	1942			
Sud-Ouest Bretagne	France	Propeller	Strategic	1946		2,175	
Vickers Valentia	UK	Propeller	Strategic	1934		1,300	
Vickers Valetta	UK	Propeller	Strategic / Tactical	1948	3	2,350	
Vickers VC-10	UK	Jet	Strategic / Tanker	1962			
Vickers Vernon	UK	Propeller	Strategic	1921		510	
Vickers Victoria	UK	Propeller	Strategic	1926		1,240	
Vickers Warwick C Mk III	UK	Propeller	Strategic	1944	4.3	3,700	
Waco CG-4A	US	Glider	Tactical	1942	1.9		
Yakovlev Yak-24	USSR	Rotorcraft		1952	3.5	165	
Yakovlev Yak-100	USSR	Rotorcraft	Tactical	1948		325	

== See also ==
- Cargo aircraft
- Military transport aircraft
- List of Aircraft
