= No. 31 Squadron RAF =

Flying squadron of the Royal Air Force

- Squadron badge
- Active: 1915–1918 (RFC); 1918–1946; 1946–1947; 1948–1971; 1971–2019; 2023–present
- Country: United Kingdom
- Branch: Royal Air Force
- Type: Remotely Piloted Air System squadron
- Role: Intelligence, surveillance, target acquisition, and reconnaissance (ISTAR) and attack
- Part of: ISTAR Force
- Station: RAF Waddington
- Nickname: 'Goldstars'
- Mottos: In cælum indicum primus (Latin for 'First into Indian skies')
- Mascots: Flt Lt, The Right Honourable, "Arris Arietis" Esq (Panda)
- Aircraft: General Atomics Protector RG1

Insignia
- Roundel
- Tail codes: ZA (Apr 1939 – Sep 1939); CB (Jul 1948 – Mar 1955); VS (Jul 1948 – 1951); DA–DZ (Jun 1976 – Mar 2019)

No. 31 Squadron, known as the Goldstars, is a squadron of the Royal Air Force. It is based at RAF Waddington, Lincolnshire and is equipped with the General Atomics Protector RG1.

The Squadron lays claim to being the first military unit to fly in India, where it was based from 1915 to 1947. Throughout the Cold War, No. 31 Squadron was based in West Germany, flying from RAF Laarbruch and RAF Brüggen. Between September 1984 and March 2019, the squadron operated the Panavia Tornado GR1/4, initially from RAF Brüggen and from August 2001 at RAF Marham, Norfolk. The squadron was disbanded in March when the Tornado retired and later reformed 2023 to operate the Protector RG1.

== History ==
=== First World War (1915–1918) ===
No. 31 Squadron was formed at Farnborough in Hampshire on 11 October 1915 as part of the Royal Flying Corps. The squadron was initially composed of a single 'A' flight and was equipped with the Royal Aircraft Factory B.E.2c. It was soon deployed to Risalpur, on the North-West Frontier in the British Raj, arriving on 26 December. 'B' and 'C' flights were formed at Gosport, also in Hampshire, in January and April 1916, before joining up with 'A' flight in Risalpur in May.

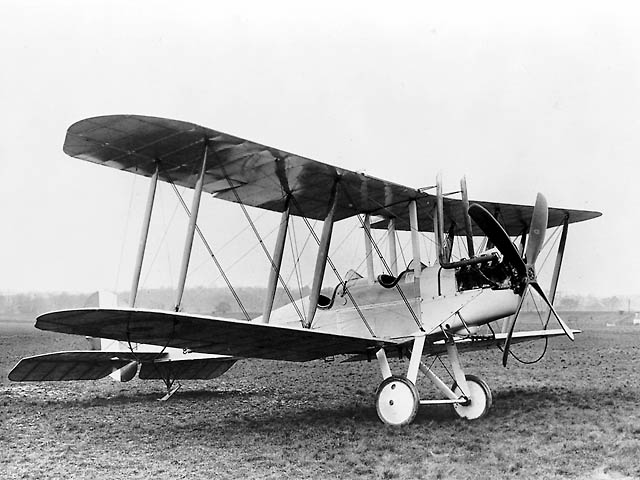
A Royal Aircraft Factory B.E.2c, similar to what No. 31 Squadron flew from 1915 to 1920.

In 1917, the squadron sent a detachment to Khormaskar, Aden, to fly reconnaissance flights against Ottoman forces. No. 31 Squadron helped form No. 114 Squadron at Lahore in Punjab Province when it provided an initial nucleus in September 1917. The squadron would remained in India throughout the entirety of the First World War, flying the B.E.2c, B.E.2e and the Henri Farman HF.27, primarily supporting the British Army against dissident tribesmen.

=== Inter-War period (1919–1938) ===
No. 31 Squadron, along with No. 114 Squadron, took part in operations during the Third Anglo-Afghan War between May and August 1919. No. 31 Squadron carried out raids on Jalalabad on 17, 20 and 24 May in which they lost three aircraft. In June 1919, the squadron's fleet was standardised with the replacement of the B.E.2 and HF.27 with the Bristol F.2B Fighter. For the next ten years, No. 31 Squadron helped police the Waziristan and Afghanistan regions, as well as supporting the British Army in suppressing rebellions.

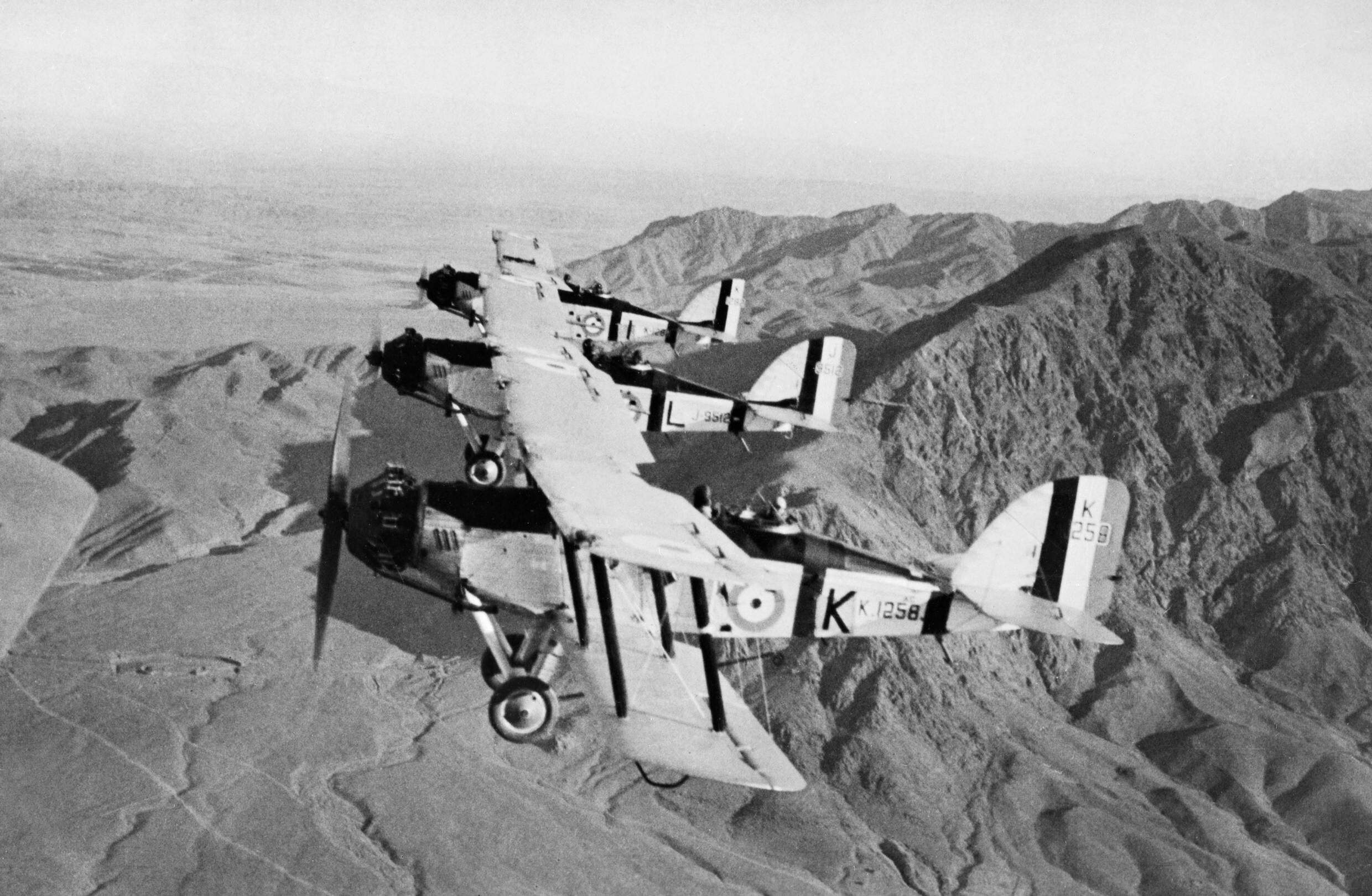
Three Westland Wapiti Mk.IIA of No. 31 Squadron, flying over the North West Frontier of India in the early 1930s

In February 1931, No. 31 Squadron replaced the outdated Bristol F.2B with the Westland Wapiti Mk.IIa. The 1935 Quetta earthquake in the Baluchistan Agency, forced the squadron to relocate to RAF Drigh Road in Karachi.

In April 1939, the squadron became a bomber-transport squadron when it inherited Vickers Valentias from No. 216 Squadron and the Bomber Transport Flight. After re-equipping with the Valentia, the squadron carried out attacks against Mirzali Khan (known as the Faqir of Ipi) during the 1939 Waziristan campaign.

=== Second World War (1939–1945) ===
For the first eighteen months of the Second World War, No. 31 Squadron remained stationed at the North-West Frontier. In April 1941, it started to re-equip with Douglas DC-2 and began flying support missions to RAF Habbaniya during the 1941 Iraqi coup d'état and the following Anglo-Iraqi War. Returning to India, the squadron re-equipped with the Douglas Dakota Mk.I. After the Japanese invasion of Burma, it flew missions between Calcutta and Rangoon, dropping supplies for the British Army's Fourteenth Army. After the end of the war, the squadron moved to Java.

=== Cold War (1946–1990s) ===
In 1946, No. 31 Squadron was disbanded in Java and reformed at PAF Base Masroor, Mauripur Karachi, at that time in British India.

At the end of 1947, No. 31 Squadron was again disbanded, but reformed in July 1948 when it took over the aircraft and role of the Metropolitan Communications Squadron at RAF Hendon in Greater London.

==== Canberra ====
On 1 March 1955, the squadron reverted to its previous identity, and moved to RAF Laarbruch in West Germany, operating the English Electric Canberra PR.7 in the photo reconnaissance role. The squadron received its squadron standard, for 25 years of service, on 13 September 1956.

Between 8 and 12 September 1958, No. 31 (Photographic Reconnaissance) Squadron participated in Royal Flush III, a reconnaissance competition between NATO's Second Allied Tactical Air Force (2 ATAF) and Fourth Allied Tactical Air Force (4 ATAF) at Spangdahlem Air Base in West Germany. for the high altitude part of the competition, the squadron joined No. 17 Squadron as part of 2 ATAF, flying against US Air Force Douglas RB-66 Destroyers of 4 ATAF, with the RAF squadrons being awarded the trophy by US Army General Alfred Gruenther. No. 31 Squadron hosted 3º Stormo of the Italian Air Force when they deployed to Laarbruch in 1967.

No. 31 (PR) Squadron disbanded at Laarbruch on 31 March 1971.

==== Phantom and Jaguar ====
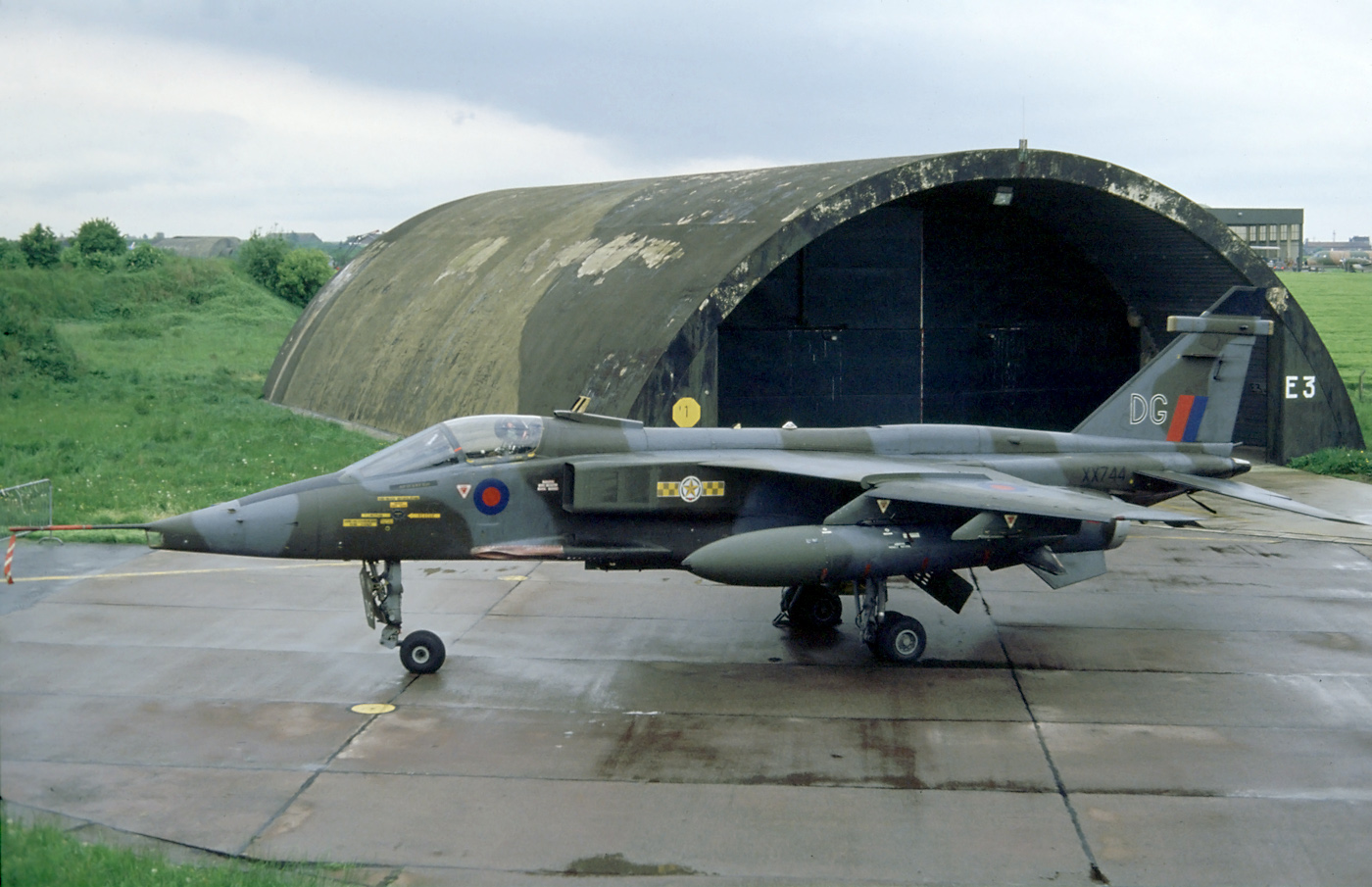
A No. 31 Squadron SEPECAT Jaguar GR1 strike aircraft at Bierset Air Base in Belgium in 1983

In June 1971, crews from No. 31 Squadron began to arrive at RAF Brüggen in West Germany to help prepare the squadron for its conversion to the McDonnell Douglas Phantom FGR.2. The squadron flew its first Phantom sortie on 20 July 1971. It held a reformation parade at Brüggen on 7 October 1971, with the occasion marked by a flypast of four Phantoms. The squadron were declared combat ready to NATO's Supreme Allied Commander Europe (SACEUR) on 1 March 1972, shortly after which it deployed to Decimomannu Air Base, Sardinia, for an armament practice camp. On 25 June 1973, the squadron lost Phantom XV440 when it crashed into the Wadden Sea, killing pilot Flight Lieutenant Hugh Kennedy and Weapon Systems Officer Squadron Leader David Hodges.

No. 31 (Designate) Squadron was formed on 1 January 1976 in preparation for conversion to the SEPECAT Jaguar GR1 strike aircraft, with the new Officer Commanding Wing Commander Terry Nash arriving at Brüggen on 12 January. The squadron's Jaguars were declared operational on 30 June 1976, with the Phantoms being transferred to both No. 19 Squadron and No. 92 Squadron. In December 1976, No. 31 Squadron was declared combat ready to SACEUR, with conventional weapons and from 1977 with eight British WE.177 nuclear bombs.

==== Tornado ====
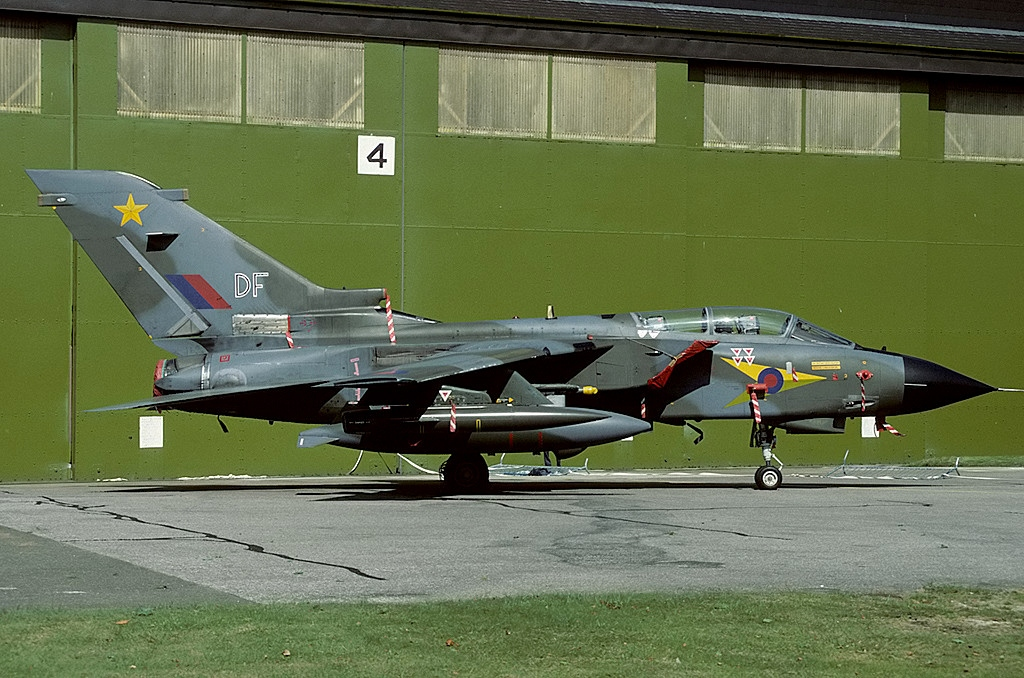
A Panavia Tornado GR1 of No. 31 Squadron at RAF Waddington, August 1986

No. 31 (Designate) Squadron was formed in September 1984, when the unit took delivery of Panavia Tornado GR1 at RAF Brüggen. The squadron completed its conversion from the Jaguar on 1 November 1984. Its assignment to SACEUR and its war role did not change, although the squadron's allocation of WE.177 weapons increased to eighteen, to account for the greater capacity of the Tornado, which could each carry two nuclear weapons, and the ratio of weapons to aircraft at full strength increased to 1.5 : 1. The apparent mismatch between aircraft numbers and WE.177 numbers is explained thus: RAF staff planners expected up to one third attrition in a conventional European high-intensity war, and some aircraft were to be held back in reserve to ensure that if a conflict escalated to use of tactical nuclear weapons, there were sufficient aircraft surviving to deliver the squadron's full stockpile of eighteen nuclear weapons.

In 1991, No. 31 Squadron was the lead squadron of the detachment of RAF Tornados operating from Dhahran Air Base in Saudi Arabia during Operation Granby, the British participation in the Gulf War following the Iraqi invasion of Kuwait. Under the overall command of Wing Commander Jeremy (Jerry) Witts, the composite squadron principally comprised aircraft and crews of No. 31 Squadron with elements of No. 9 Squadron, No. 14 Squadron, No. 17 Squadron and No. 27 Squadron, together with a reconnaissance flight formed from elements of No. 2 Squadron and No. 13 Squadron. Witts was subsequently awarded the Distinguished Service Order (DSO) for his actions.

The squadron's nuclear strike role at Bruggen ended in 1994. On 1 January 1995, the squadron was declared operational in the suppression of enemy air defences (SEAD) role equipped with the ALARM (Air Launched Anti-Radiation Missile).

During 1999, the squadron re-equipped with the Tornado GR4. While all the RAF's Tornado GR4 were capable of carrying the ALARM, only No. 31 Squadron and No. 9 Squadron specialised in the role and were known as "Pathfinder" squadrons. In the same year, No. 31 Squadron participated in NATO operations over the Federal Republic of Yugoslavia, known as Operation Engadine. For the latter part of this operation the squadron was temporarily based in Corsica.

=== 21st century (2000 – present) ===
No. 31 Squadron was the last RAF Squadron to be based at RAF Brüggen, returning to the UK in August 2001 to become based at RAF Marham, Norfolk. In 2003, the squadron formed the core of the Ali Al Salem Air Base Air Combat Wing in Kuwait; an amalgamated composite squadron of No. 31 Squadron, No. 2 Squadron, No. 9 Squadron and No. 617 Squadron crews under the overall command of Wing Commander Paddy Teakle, officer commanding No. 31 Squadron at the time. His actions in command of the squadron earned him the DSO. From Ali Al Salem, the squadron operated over Iraq during Operation Resonate South and Operation Telic.

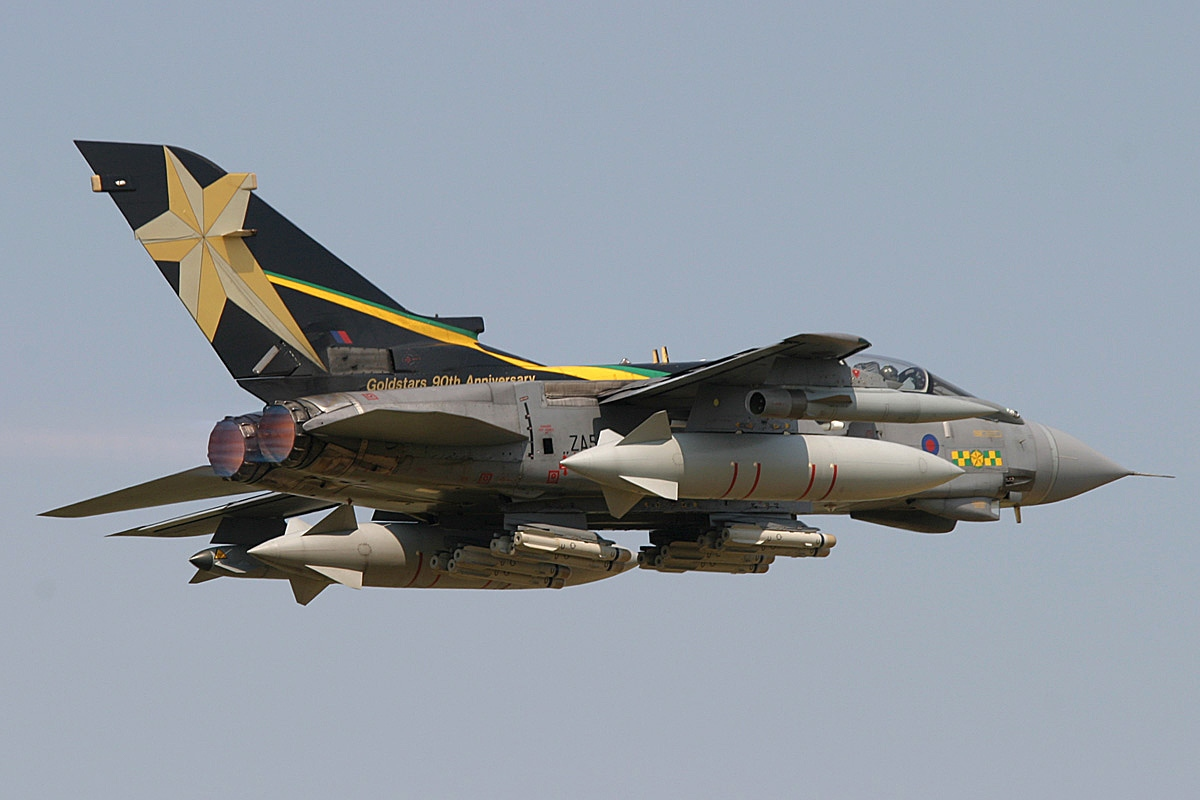
A Panavia Tornado GR4 wearing No. 31 Squadron 90th Anniversary markings during 2006

No. 31 Squadron became the lead RAF Tornado GR4 unit using the Brimstone anti-tank missile, accepting the weapon into RAF service at Marham on 7 April 2005.

The squadron completed a tour of Afghanistan as part of Operation Herrick in 2012, providing fast air support to ground troops in contact with the enemy.

In September 2012, the squadron participated in Exercise Shaheen Star, a series of exercises in the United Arab Emirates with the host nation's air force, the French Air Force and the US Air Force.

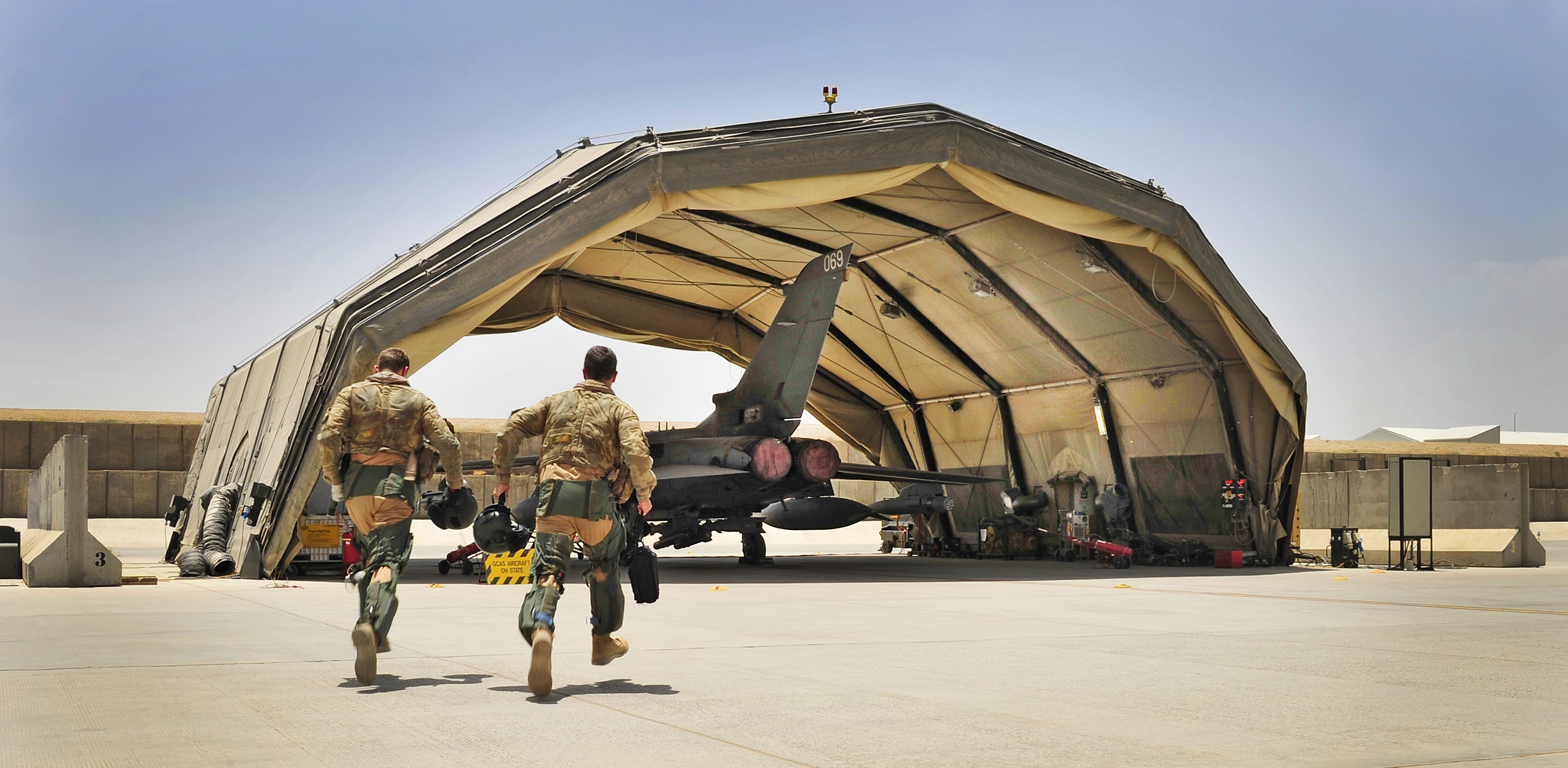
No. 31 Squadron aircrew scramble to a Panavia Tornado GR4 at Kandahar Airfield in Afghanistan, June 2013.

On 12 August 2014, the squadron deployed six Tornados to RAF Akrotiri, Cyprus, after the UK government authorised reconnaissance missions over Mount Sinjar in Iraq. However, they were shortly relieved to allow the squadron to deploy to Kandahar Airfield, Afghanistan, for their (and the Tornado's) last Operation Herrick deployment – returning to Marham on 11 November 2014. No. 31 Squadron returned to RAF Akrotiri in February 2015 for their first Operation Shader deployment.

On 10 July 2018, to celebrate the RAF's 100th anniversary, nine Tornado GR4 from No. 31 Squadron and No. 9 Squadron participated in a flypast over London. On 13 November 2018, Tornado GR.4 ZD716 was unveiled by the RAF in a special retirement scheme to mark 35 years of Tornado operations. No. 31 Squadron was disbanded, along with No. 9 Squadron, on 14 March 2019 at RAF Marham.

=== Protector RG1 (2023 – present) ===
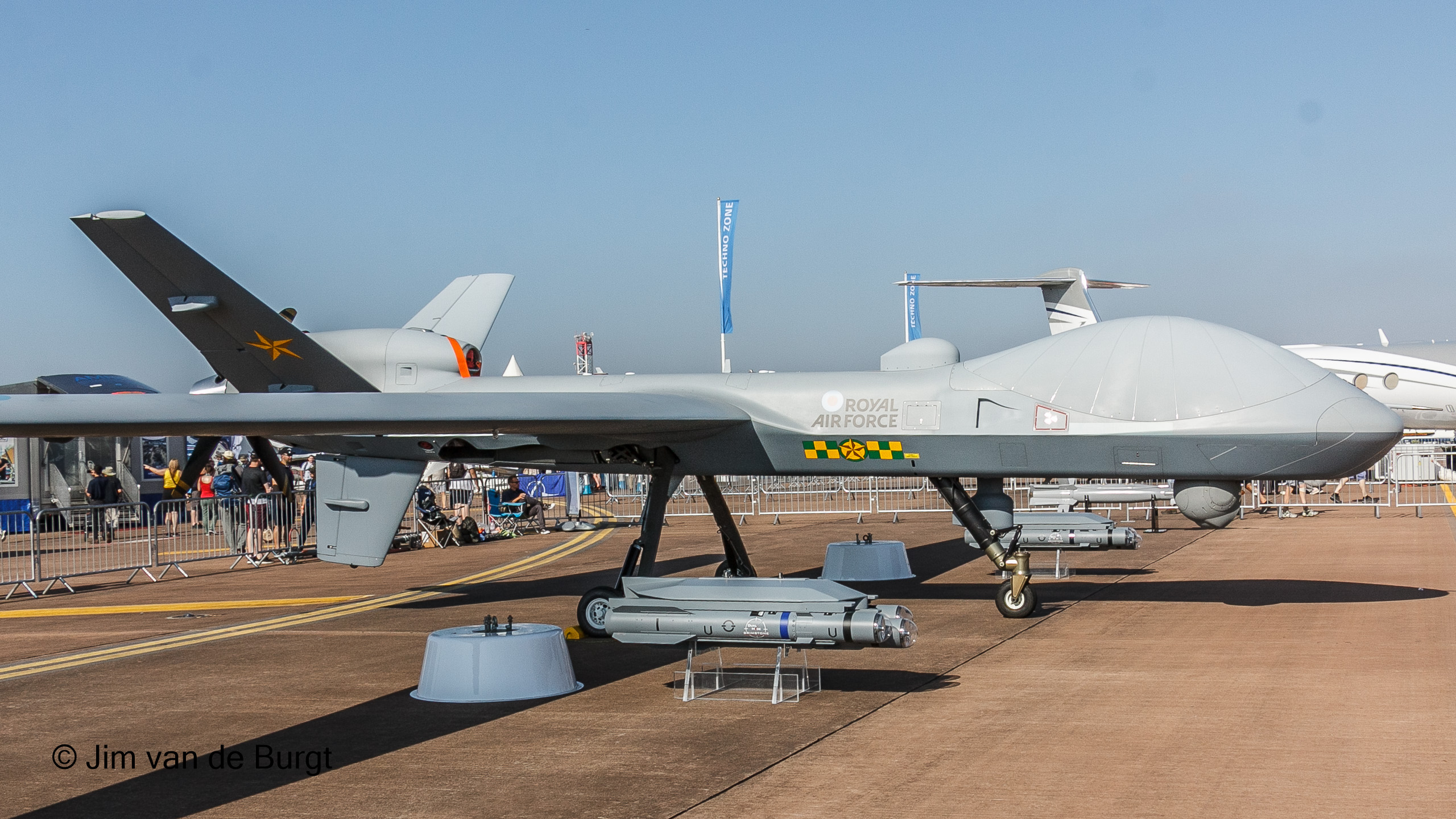
A General Atomics Protector RG1 in No. 31 Squadron markings at Royal International Air Tattoo at RAF Fairford in 2018

No. 31 Squadron reformed on 11 October 2023 at RAF Waddington, Lincolnshire, equipped with the General Atomics MQ-9B, a remotely piloted air system (RPAS), which is designated Protector RG1 in RAF service. The first Protector was delivered to Waddington on 29 September 2023.

== Heritage ==
=== Badge and motto ===
The squadron's badge features in front of a wreath of laurel, a mullet. The badge was based on an unofficial emblem, the mullet indicating the Star of India and the squadron's claim to being the first military unit to fly in India and the wreath representing the high honour achieved by the squadron. It was approved by King George VI in June 1937.

The squadron's motto is In cælum indicum primus (Latin for 'First into Indian skies').

=== Nickname ===
The squadron's nickname is the 'Goldstars', reflecting the gold start in the squadron badge.

=== Memorial ===
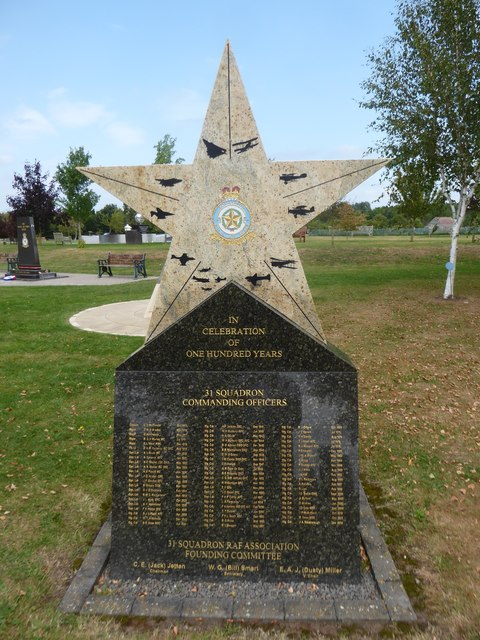
The No. 31 Squadron memorial at the National Memorial Arboretum

As part of the celebrations of its 100th birthday, a No. 31 Squadron memorial was unveiled in October 2015 at the National Memorial Arboretum in Staffordshire. The memorial, designed by SRA Architecture, comprises a cream-coloured granite star formed mounted on a dark green granite base. The front of the star features the squadron badge and the silhouettes of a range of aircraft flown by the squadron, whereas the back lists the squadrons battle honours. The base lists the squadron's commanding officers on the front and the stations at which the squadron has been located on the rear.

== Battle honours ==
No. 31 Squadron has received the following battle honours. Those marked with an asterisk (*) may be emblazoned on the squadron standard.

- North West Frontier (1916–1918)*
- Afghanistan (1919–1920)
- Mahoud (1919–1920)
- Waziristan (1919–1925)
- North West Frontier (1939)
- Iraq (1941)*
- Syria (1941)
- Egypt and Libya (1941–1942)*
- Burma (1941–1942)*
- North Burma (1943–1944)*
- Arakan (1943–1944)*
- Manipur (1944)*
- Burma (1944–1945)*
- Gulf (1991)*
- Kosovo (1999)*
- Afghanistan (2001–2014)
- Iraq (2003)*
- Iraq (2003–2011)

== Affiliations ==
- HMS Iron Duke (F234)
- 3 Regiment Army Air Corps
- Honourable Company of Air Pilots
- 31 (Tower Hamlets) Squadron, Air Training Corps (RAF Air Cadets)

== See also ==
- List of RAF squadrons
