= Edward Scholefield =

- Born: 22 October 1893; Calgary, Alberta, Canada
- Died: 1 May 1929 (aged 39); Shepperton, Surrey, England, UK
- Military career
- Allegiance: United Kingdom
- Branch: Royal Flying Corps; Royal Air Force
- Rank: Flight Lieutenant
- Awards: Distinguished Conduct Medal; Air Force Cross
- Other work: Chief Test Pilot

Flight Lieutenant Edward Rodolph Clement Scholefield 1893-1929 DCM AFC (known as Tiny Scholefield) was an aviator and a motor racing driver. He was killed during a test flight of a Vickers Vanguard airliner in 1929.

== Early life ==
Scholefield was born on 22 October 1893 in Calgary, Alberta, Canada. In the 1901 Census of Bournemouth, Scholefield aged 6 is listed with his sister Vandine as a boarder at a School.

== Aviator ==
Scholefield was awarded a French aviators certificate on 5 April 1912. He joined the Royal Flying Corps as an airman at the start of the First World War and was later commissioned. In 1915 when on patrol over the Western Front he was shot down and taken prisoner; he remained a German prisoner of war until the end of the war. During the war he had won the Distinguished Conduct Medal and following the war he became an experimental test pilot at the Royal Aircraft Establishment. In 1923 he was awarded the Air Force Cross.

== Test pilot ==
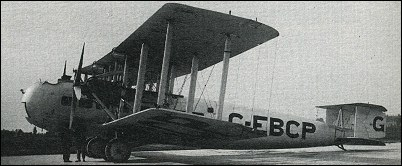
G-EBCP, the Vickers Vanguard in which Scholefield died

Following his retirement from the Royal Air Force Scholefield became Chief Test Pilot for Vickers at Brooklands and became well known as an air racer and demonstration pilot. It was not usual in the 1920s for pilots to wear parachutes but he was given one in June 1926 with the instruction that it was to be used on all test flights. The following day he found himself in trouble when he had inverted an aircraft (a Vickers Wibault) and it would not right itself; he then used his newly acquired parachute and landed without injury.

On 16 May 1929, Scholefield was killed when the aircraft crashed and burned at Shepperton on the shore of the River Thames. Scholefield and the Rolls-Royce aero-engine mechanic Frank. W. Sherratt were test flying the Vanguard airliner from Brooklands Aerodrome when control was lost and the aircraft nose-dived from 2,000 feet (610 m) into the ground. Observers had seen something fluttering away from the tail just before the aircraft dived. Scholefield was killed in the burnt wreck, and Sherratt who had jumped from the aircraft died from the fall.

== Family life ==
Scholefield had married Dorothy Seymour in 1919 and they had one son, Kenneth Rodolph Seymour in 1923.
