= RAF squadron standards and battle honours =

RAF squadron standards and battle honours are part of the heraldry of the Royal Air Force and are used to express a squadron's heritage and achievements. Squadron standards are ceremonial flags that are granted to squadrons on meeting certain criteria. Battle honours are awarded to commemorate notable battles, actions, or engagements in which squadron personnel have taken part.

== Squadron standards ==
=== History ===
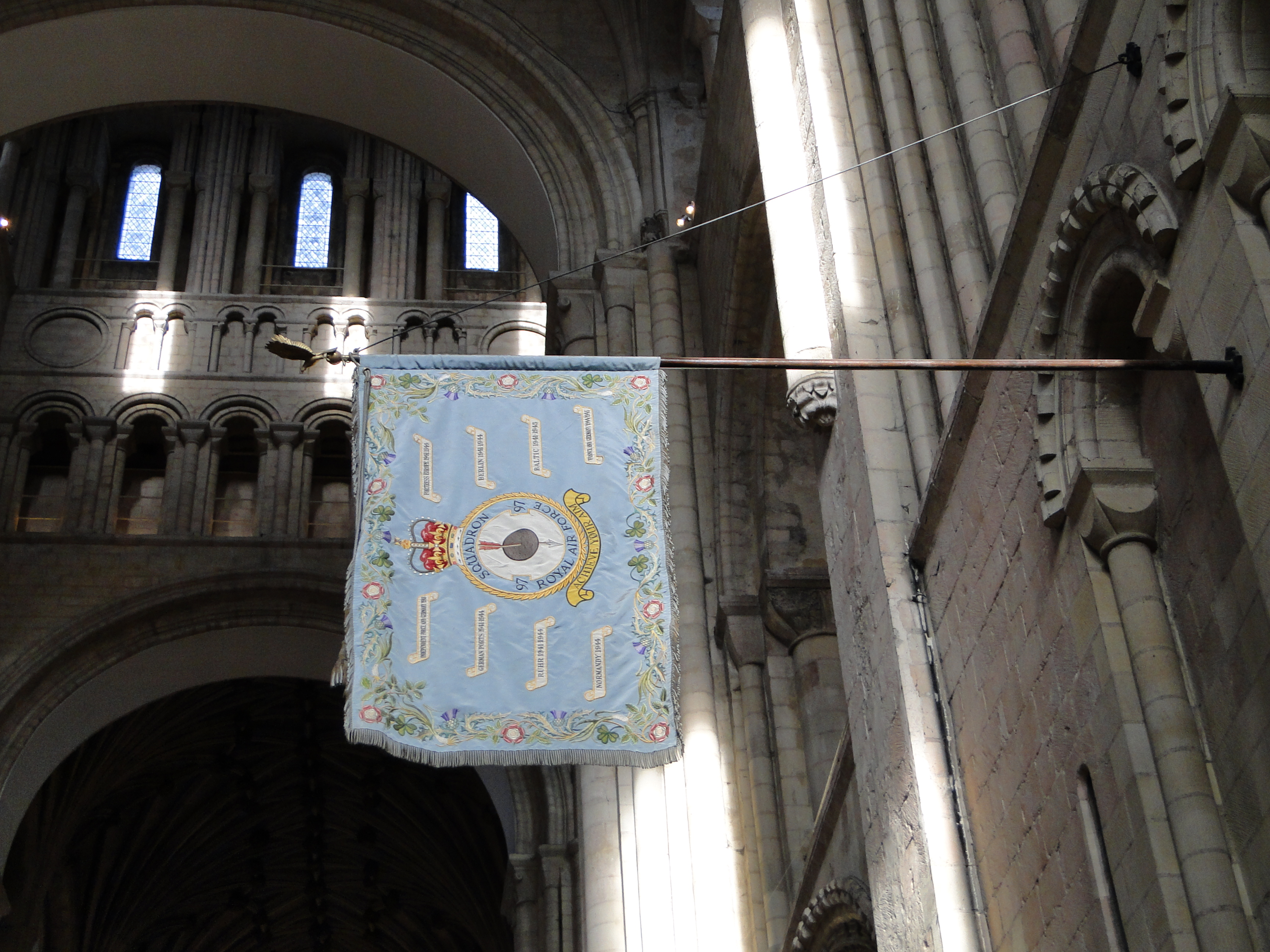
The squadron standard belonging to No. 97 Squadron of the Royal Air Force

Throughout British history, military leaders have employed ceremonial flags for the purposes of identifying rally points for troops during battle, these flags being known as 'standards'. The positions of the standards on a battlefield would provide an indication of how the battle was progressing.

The history of squadron standards in the Royal Air Force can be traced back to the Second World War, when on the 25th anniversary of the RAF in 1943, King George VI declared his plan to grant standards to operational squadrons. For a standard to be awarded, the squadron had to qualify by either completing 25 years of service in the RAF; Royal Auxiliary Air Force; Royal Naval Air Service; or Royal Flying Corps; or be recognised by the monarch for outstanding merit during operations. The requirements for the awarding of a squadron standard were laid down in Air Ministry Order 866, 1943 and initially thirty squadrons automatically qualified for the awarding of a standard.

The first standards were awarded in the 1950s, with thirty squadrons qualifying for their length of service, whereas No. 617 Squadron was awarded in recognition of its role in Operation Chastise in May 1943, otherwise known as the 'Dambuster Raid'.

=== Design ===
Squadron standards measure 4 feet (120 cm) x 2 feet 8 inches (81.2 cm). They are hand-made in light-blue silk, with blue and gold fringes and tassels. Around the border are embroidered roses, thistles, shamrocks and leeks, national emblems of the constituent countries of the United Kingdom. Initially the design did not include the leek for Wales; this was highlighted in Parliament by a Welsh MP and subsequent standards were amended to include the leek. The centre of the standard features embroidery of the squadron's approved heraldic badge and scrolls identifying battle honours which the squadron has been awarded. Originally only eight battle honours could be emblazoned which was later raised to ten. In the 1980s this was amended to fifteen, but the number shown must be limited to eight pre-Operation Corporate (Falklands Campaign) honours.

Standards are typically mounted on an 8 feet 1 inch (246.3 cm) flagstaff featuring a gold eagle with elevated wings.

=== Battle honours ===
The practice of awarding battle honours was inherited by the RAF from its Army and Navy predecessors upon its creation in 1918. Several squadrons therefore carry honours awarded when they were a part of the Royal Flying Corps or Royal Naval Air Service. Battle honours are not awarded for every operation conducted by British forces and not every squadron taking part in an operation is entitled to emblazon the honour on their standard, only those involved in contact with the enemy.

In 1943, King George VI approved the award of a Standard to RAF squadrons who have 25 years of service in either the RAF, Royal Auxiliary Air Force, Royal Naval Air Service or Royal Flying Corps. Standards can also be awarded to units which have "earned the King's appreciation for outstanding operations".

Below is a list of battle honours separated by major campaigns which may be claimed by RAF squadrons.

== First World War battle honours ==
- Aegean
- Amiens
- Arabia
- Arras, 1917
- Cambrai, 1917
- East Africa, 1916–18
- Egypt, 1914–17
- Helles
- Hindenburg Line
- Home Defence, 1916–1918
- Home Waters 1914–1918
- Independent Force & Germany
- Isonzo
- Italian Front & Adriatic, 1917–18 (Note: Originally awarded as two separate battle honours. They were amalgamated in March 1952.)
- Loos
- Lys
- Marne (1918)
- Megiddo 1918
- Mesopotamia, 1915–1918
- Messines, 1917
- Mons
- Neuve Chappelle
- North West Frontier, 1916–1918
- Palestine (Gaza)
- Piave
- Somme, 1916
- Somme, 1918
- South-West Africa
- Suvia
- Vittorio Veneto
- Western Front, 1914–18
- Western Front, 1916–17
- Western Front, 1917–18
- Ypres, 1917

== Inter-War battle honours ==
- Aden 1928
- Aden 1929
- Aden 1934
- Afghanistan 1919–1920
- Burma 1930–1932
- Iraq 1919–1920
- Iraq 1923–1925
- Iraq 1928–1929
- Kurdistan 1919
- Kurdistan 1922–1924
- Kurdistan 1930–1931
- Mahsud 1919–1920
- Mohmand 1927
- Mohmand 1933
- Northern Kurdistan 1932
- Northern Russia 1918–1919
- North West Frontier 1930–1931
- North West Frontier 1935–1939
- North West Persia 1920
- Palestine 1936–1939
- Somaliland 1920
- South Persia 1918–1919
- South Russia 1919–1920
- Sudan 1920
- Transjordan 1924
- Waziristan 1919–1925

== Second World War battle honours ==
- Anzio and Nettuno.

For operations in support of the Allied landings in Italy 9–16 September 1943.

- Arakan 1942–1944.

For operations by fighter, bomber and transport squadrons in support of the First and Second Arakan Offensives, November 1942 to February 1943 and November 1943 to March 1944.

- Arctic 1940–1945.

For operations over the Arctic by squadrons of Coastal Command based in Iceland, Russia and Shetland.

- Arnhem 1944.

For squadrons participating in the operations of the Allied Airborne Army, 17–26 September 1944.

- Atlantic 1939–1945.

For operations by aircraft of Coastal Command and others employed in the coastal role over the Atlantic Ocean from the outbreak of war to VE Day.

- Baltic 1939–1945. For operations over the Baltic and its approaches by squadrons of Bomber and Coastal Commands from the outbreak of war to VE Day.
- Battle of Britain 1940.

For interception operations by fighter squadrons over Britain, August to October 1940.

- Berlin 1940–1945.

For bombardment of Berlin by aircraft of Bomber Command.

- Biscay 1940–1945.

For operations over the Bay of Biscay by aircraft of Coastal and Fighter Commands, and of Bomber Command loaned to Coastal Command between the fall of France and VE Day, 25 June 1940 to 8 May 1945.

- Biscay Ports 1940–1945. For operations over the Bay of Biscay ports from the fall of France to VE Day.
- Bismarck. For operations by aircraft of Coastal command associated with the action against the Bismarck, 24–29 May 1941.
- Burma 1944–1945. For operations during the 14th Army's advance from Imphal to Rangoon, the coastal amphibious assaults, and the Battle of Pegu Yomas, August 1944 to August 1945.
- Ceylon 1942. For operations against Japanese aircraft and naval units by squadrons based in Ceylon during the Japanese attacks of April 1942.
- Channel And North Sea 1939–1945. For ship attack, anti-submarine and mining operations over the English Channel and North Sea from the outbreak of war to VE Day.
- Dieppe.

For squadrons participating in the Combined Operations Dieppe Raid (Dieppe, France) on 19 August 1942.

- Dunkirk.

For operations covering the evacuation of the British Expeditionary Force and the French from Dunkirk (Operation Dynamo), 26 May to 4 June 1940.

- East Africa 1940–1941. For operations over Kenya, the Sudan, Abyssinia, Italian Somaliland, British Somaliland, Eritrea and the Red Sea during the campaign which resulted in the conquest of Italian East Africa, 10 June 1940 to 27 November 1941.
- Eastern Waters 1941–1945. For operations over waters east of the Mediterranean and Red Sea including the Indian Ocean, Bay of Bengal, Java Sea and South China Sea throughout the war with Japan.
- Egypt And Libya 1942–1943. For operations in the defence of Egypt and the conquest of Libya, from the outbreak of war against Italy to the retreat of the Axis Forces into Tunisia 10 June 1940 to 6 February 1943.
- El Alamein. For operations during the retreat to El Alamein and subsequent actions, June to November 1942.
- El Hamma. For operations at El Hamma in support of the Battle of the Mareth Line by squadrons operationally controlled by Air Headquarters, Western Desert, 20–24 March 1943.
- Fortress Europe 1940–1944. For operations by aircraft based in the British Isles against targets in Germany, Italy and enemy-occupied Europe, from the fall of France to the invasion of Normandy.
- France And Germany 1944–1945. For operations over France, Belgium, the Netherlands and Germany during the liberation of north-west Europe and the advance into Germany, from the start of air action preparatory to the invasion of France to VE Day, April 1944 to 8 May 1945.
- France And Low Countries 1939–1940. For operations in France and the Low Countries between the outbreak of war and the fall of France, 3 September 1939 to 25 June 1940.
- German Ports 1940–1945. For bombardment of the German ports by aircraft of Bomber and Coastal Commands.
- Greece 1940–1941. For operations over Albania and Greece during the Italian and German invasion, whether carried out by squadrons based in Greece or operating from external bases, 28 October 1940 to 30 April 1941.
- Gothic Line. For operations in support of the breaching of the Gothic Line, August to September 1944.
- Gustav Line. For squadrons participating in the operations against the Gustav Line, May 1944.
- Habbaniya. For units engaged in the defence of RAF Habbaniya, 30 April to 6 May 1941.
- Home Defence 1940–1945. For interception operations after the Battle of Britain, in defence of Great Britain and Northern Ireland against enemy aircraft and flying bombs, November 1940 to 1945.
- Invasion Ports 1940. For bombing operations against German-occupied Channel ports, to dislocate enemy preparations for the invasion of England.
- Iraq 1941. For operations in the defeat of Rashid Ali's rebellion, 2–31 May 1941.
- Italy 1943–1945. For operations over Italy.
- Madagascar 1942. For operations by squadrons of the South African Air Force during and after the landings in Madagascar.
- Malaya 1941–1942. For operations against the Japanese in Malaya, Sumatra and Java from 8 December 1941 to 12 March 1942.
- Malta 1940–1942. For squadrons participating in defensive, offensive and reconnaissance operations from Malta during the period of enemy action against the island, 10 June 1940 to 31 December 1942.
- Manipur 1944. For operations in support of the besieged forces at Imphal, March to July 1944.
- Mediterranean 1940–1943. For operations over Italy, Sicily and the Mediterranean and Aegean Seas by aircraft based in the Mediterranean area between 10 June 1940 and 30 June 1943.
- Meuse Bridges. For squadrons participating in bombing operations against crossings of the Meuse during the German breakthrough between Sedan and Dinant, 12–14 May 1940.
- Normandy 1944. For operations supporting the Allied landings in Normandy, the establishment of the lodgement area and the subsequent breakthrough, June to August 1944.
- North Africa 1942–1943. For operations in connection with the campaign in French North Africa from the initial landings in Algeria to the expulsion of the Axis Powers from Tunisia, 8 November 1942 to 13 May 1943.
- North Burma 1943–1944. For the supply by air of General Wingate's first long-range penetration into North Burma, February to June 1943; and for the air supply and support of his second expedition, 5 March to 26 June 1944.
- Norway 1940. For operations over Norway during the German invasion, 9 April to 9 June 1940. Applicable to squadrons based in Norway and those operating from home bases.
- Pacific 1941–1945. For operations against the Japanese in the Pacific theatre throughout the war with Japan, 8 December 1941 to 15 August 1945.
- Rhine. For operations in support of the battle for the Rhine crossing, 8 February to 24 March 1945.
- Ruhr 1940–1945. For bombardment of the Ruhr Area by aircraft of Bomber Command.
- Russia 1941–1945. For operations from Russian bases.
- Salerno. For operations in support of the Allied landings in Italy, 9–16 September 1943.
- Sicily 1943. For operations in furtherance of the conquest of Sicily by aircraft based in Africa, Malta and Sicily, 1 July to 17 August 1943.
- South East Europe 1942–1945. For operations over Yugoslavia, Hungary, Romania, Bulgaria and Greece.
- Special Operations. For operations by squadrons regularly assigned to special duties, i.e. the succour of resistance movements in enemy-occupied countries by dropping supplies and by introducing and evacuating personnel by air from the formation of the first special duty flight (20 August 1940), after the fall of France, to VE and VJ Days respectively.
- Syria 1941. For operations over Syria during the campaign against the Vichy French, 8 June to 12 July 1941.
- The Dams. For squadrons participating in the operations for breaching the Mohne, Eder, Serpe and Kembs Dams, May 1943 to October 1944. See Operation Chastise.
- Tirpitz. For operations resulting in the sinking of Tirpitz.
- Walcheren. For operations in support of the capture of the island of Walcheren, 3 October to 9 November 1944.

== Post 1945 battle honours ==
- Korea 1950–1953.

Limited to the three RAF Sunderland flying boat squadrons which flew patrols during the Korean War but were not involved in confrontation with the enemy. Not authorized to be emblazoned.

- South Atlantic 1982.

For service in latitudes between 35° and 60° South during the period 2 April to 14 June 1982. Three of the RAF squadrons involved (Nos. 1, 18 Squadrons and 63 Squadron RAF Regiment) have the right of emblazonment. See Falklands War.

- Gulf 1991.

For operations against Iraqi invasion forces in Kuwait January–March 1991.

- Bosnia 1995.

RAF participation in, or direct support to, the allied air campaign over the Federal Republic of Yugoslavia. Nos IV(AC) and 6 Squadrons have the right to emblazonment.

- Kosovo.

RAF participation in, or direct support to, the allied air campaign over the Federal Republic of Yugoslavia during the period 24 March to 20 June 1999. Nos 1, 9, 14 and 31 Squadrons have the right to emblazonment, Nos 7, 8, 23, 51, 101 and 216 Squadrons do not.

- Sierra Leone 2000.

RAF support of UK military intervention in Sierra Leone. No 7 Squadron has the right to emblazonment.

- Iraq 2003.

RAF support of Invasion of Iraq.

- Iraq 2003-2011.

RAF operations in Iraq following the invasion in 2003. See Operation Telic.

- Afghanistan 2001-2014.

RAF support to operations in Afghanistan (Operation Herrick).

- Libya 2011.

RAF support to the 2011 military intervention in Libya.
