= Vickers Type 264 Valentia =

British bomber transport aircraft (1934–1944)

Type 264 Valentia
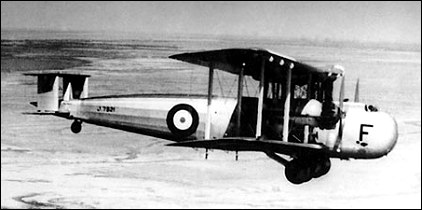

General information
- Type: Bomber Transport
- Manufacturer: Vickers
- Primary user: Royal Air Force

History
- Introduction date: 1934
- Retired: 1944
- Developed from: Vickers Victoria

The Vickers Valentia (company designation Type 264) was a British biplane bomber transport aircraft built by Vickers for the Royal Air Force. The majority built were conversions of the earlier Vickers Victoria, itself derived from the Vickers Virginia.

== Design and development ==
While the Napier Lion-powered Victoria served successfully with the RAF as a bomber transport, by 1932, the Lion engine was becoming obsolete and it was clear that it could use more power. It was therefore decided to re-engine the aircraft with more powerful Bristol Pegasus engines. It was decided to carry out a two-stage upgrade, with the first, designated the Victoria Mk VI or Configuration I, having a limited maximum weight. This was followed by Configuration 2 which was capable of taking full advantage of the greater power of the Pegasus engine by virtue of a strengthened airframe featuring a strengthened wing, strut rather than wire-braced landing gear, wheel brakes and a tailwheel in place of a skid. This became the Vickers Valentia Mk I which flew for the first time in 1934.

Orders were placed for the 28 new build Valentias to Specification 30/34, with a further 54 being converted from Victorias (Type 278 within the company), with production continuing until 1936.

In 1938 a version with Pegasus IIM3 engines (which offered improved 'hot and high' performance) was supplied for service with one flight of No. 31 Squadron then based in Lahore.

== Operational history ==
The Valentia first entered service with No. 70 Squadron RAF at Hinaidi, Iraq in 1934, equipping British forces in India, Persia and Iraq.

Like the preceding Vernons and Victorias, the Valentias were extensively used for transport operations in the Middle East, and when necessary used for bombing operations with bomb racks under the wings. Valentias were also experimentally fitted with loudspeakers used to address people being overflown (in this case potentially rebellious tribes during air policing duties). The Valentia was also used for experiments with aerial refuelling by Alan Cobham.

Valentias were used for night bombing operations over the Western Desert in 1940. In service with No. 31 Squadron RAF and the RAF Communications Flight Iraq, they took part in the 1941 Siege of RAF Habbaniya and subsequent operations. They then remained in service with the Communications Flight Iraq (later Iraq & Persia) until 1944. The South African Air Force pressed a Valentia into service as a bomber in the East African Campaign in 1940–41.

The Valentia was replaced as a transport in RAF service by the Bristol Bombay.

== Variants ==
- Valentia Mk I : Military transport aircraft for the RAF.

== Operators ==
India

- Royal Indian Air Force

South Africa

- South African Air Force

United Kingdom

- Royal Air Force
  - No. 31 Squadron RAF
  - No. 70 Squadron RAF
  - No. 216 Squadron RAF
  - Communication Flight Iraq

== Specifications (Valentia Mk. I) ==
Data from Aircraft of the Royal Air Force

General characteristics

- Crew: 2
- Capacity: 22 troops
- Length: 59 ft 6 in (18.14 m)
- Wingspan: 87 ft 4 in (26.62 m)
- Height: 17 ft 9 in (5.41 m)
- Wing area: 2,178 sq ft (202.3 m^{2})
- Empty weight: 10,944 lb (4,964 kg)
- Gross weight: 19,500 lb (8,845 kg)
- Powerplant: 2 × Bristol Pegasus II L3 or M3 radial engines, 650 hp (480 kW) each

Performance

- Maximum speed: 130 mph (210 km/h, 110 kn) at 5,000 ft (1,500 m)
- Cruise speed: 117 mph (188 km/h, 102 kn)
- Range: 800 mi (1,300 km, 700 nmi)
- Service ceiling: 16,250 ft (4,950 m)
- Rate of climb: 700 ft/min (3.6 m/s)

Armament

- Bombs: Could be fitted with underwing racks for 2,200 lb of bombs

== Accidents and Incidents ==
- 7 July, 1936. A Valentia of 216 Squadron crashed at Marsa Matruh airfield. The aircraft was on a night-operation and was carrying six RAF personnel and seven British Army officers as passengers. Four of the RAF personnel and three of the officers, were killed. The six survivor were all injured.

== See also ==
Related lists

- List of aircraft of the Royal Air Force
- List of aircraft of World War II
