= Armstrong Whitworth Awana =

Awana
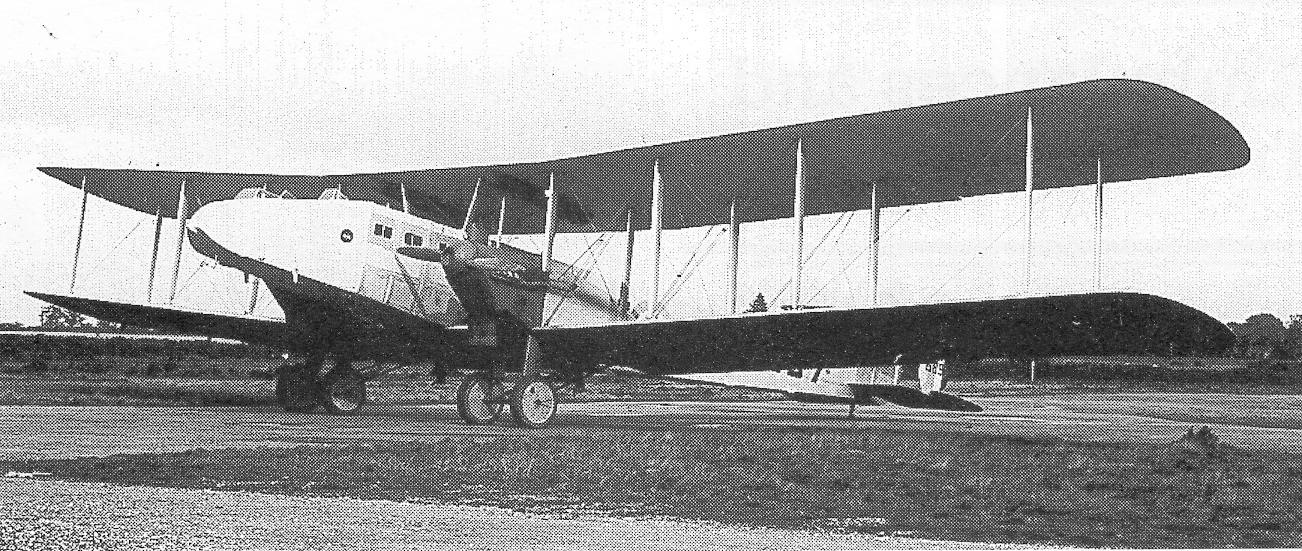

General information
- Type: Military transport biplane
- National origin: United Kingdom
- Manufacturer: Armstrong Whitworth
- Number built: 2

History
- First flight: 28 June 1923

The Armstrong Whitworth Awana was a British prototype troop-transport aircraft built to meet a 1920 Air Ministry requirement.

== Design and development ==
The Awana was designed in response to Air Ministry Specification 5/20 for a twin-engined Troop Carrying Aeroplane, able to carry 25 fully equipped troops for a distance of 400 miles. Any design was to be capable of landing on rough terrain, other requirements being folding wings and the ability to fly on one engine.

One of the largest landplanes of its time, it was a large, twin-engine four-bay staggered biplane with a box-like fuselage, and a three-rudder, biplane tail. The pilot and navigator sat in open cockpits atop the nose, while the 25 troops it was to carry entered through a hatch in the floor and sat in two rows of "bus"-style seats with a centre aisle. It was of composite construction, with a tubular-steel-framed fuselage and wooden wings incorporating substantial hinges to allow them to be folded for storage. The Napier Lion engines were supported on tubular-steel supports between the wings and housed in streamlined cowlings with retractable radiators on the underside. The three cylindrical main petrol tanks were slung under the floor in an aluminium fairing, and fed fuel via windmill-driven pumps to header tanks on the underside of the upper wing.

Two prototypes were ordered by the Air Ministry on 27 June 1921, and the first prototype, serial number J6897, first flew on 28 June 1923. Evaluated at Martlesham Heath, control during landing was found to be poor, and the structure overall too flimsy. The second prototype addressed some of these concerns, but the Vickers Victoria was selected for production instead.

== Specifications ==
Data from Armstrong Whitworth Aircraft since 1913

General characteristics

- Crew: two, pilot and navigator
- Capacity: 25 troops
- Length: 68 ft 0 in (20.73 m)
- Wingspan: 105 ft 6 in (32.16 m)
- Height: 20 ft 3 in (6.17 m)
- Wing area: 2,300 sq ft (210 m^{2})
- Empty weight: 10,000 lb (4,536 kg)
- Gross weight: 24,100 lb (10,932 kg)
- Fuel capacity: 292 imp gal (351 US gal; 1,330 L)
- Powerplant: 2 × Napier Lion 12-cylinder broad arrow engine, 450 hp (340 kW) each

Performance

- Maximum speed: 97 mph (156 km/h, 84 kn) at 1,000 ft (300 m)
- Range: 360 mi (580 km, 310 nmi)
- Service ceiling: 8,000 ft (2,400 m)
- Rate of climb: 300 ft/min (1.5 m/s)
- Time to altitude: 19.7 min to 5,000 ft (1,500 m)

== See also ==
Aircraft of comparable role, configuration, and era

- Vickers Victoria
