= Vickers Type 170 Vanguard =

1920s British airliner

Vanguard
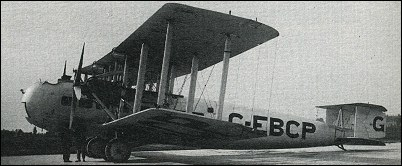

General information
- Type: Biplane airliner
- National origin: United Kingdom
- Manufacturer: Vickers Limited
- Status: Destroyed
- Primary user: Imperial Airways
- Number built: 1

History
- First flight: 1923
- Retired: 1929
- Developed from: Vickers Victoria

The Vickers Vanguard was a 1920s British airliner developed by Vickers Limited from the Victoria.

== Design and development ==
Developed from the earlier Victoria with the introduction of a wider fuselage, the Vanguard was a 22-passenger twin-engined biplane. Originally built for the Air Ministry as the Type 62 the aircraft powered by two 450 hp Napier Lion engines first flew on 18 July 1923. It was re-engined in 1925 with two 650 hp Rolls-Royce Condor IIIs and re-designated the Type 103. When it was handed over to Imperial Airways in 1925 it was described as the World's largest passenger aeroplane.

The aircraft was re-conditioned in 1928 and re-designated the Type 170 for use by Imperial Airways for route proving trials, starting in May 1928. Ii operated on the London-Paris route, typically taking about 2 1/2 hrs, and then on the London Brussels-Cologne service. It set a world load carrying record on 6 July 1928. The aircraft was withdrawn from its airline duties in October 1928 for modifications, probably to the tail, but crashed at Shepperton, Middlesex on 16 May 1929 at the start of flying trials, killing the pilot Tiny Scholefield and the flight observer Frank Sharrett..

== Variants ==
Type 62
Prototype with two 450hp Napier Lion engines, one built.
Type 103
Type 62 re-engined with two Condor III engines.
Type 170
Type 103 re-conditioned for Imperial Airways.

== Specifications (Type 170) ==
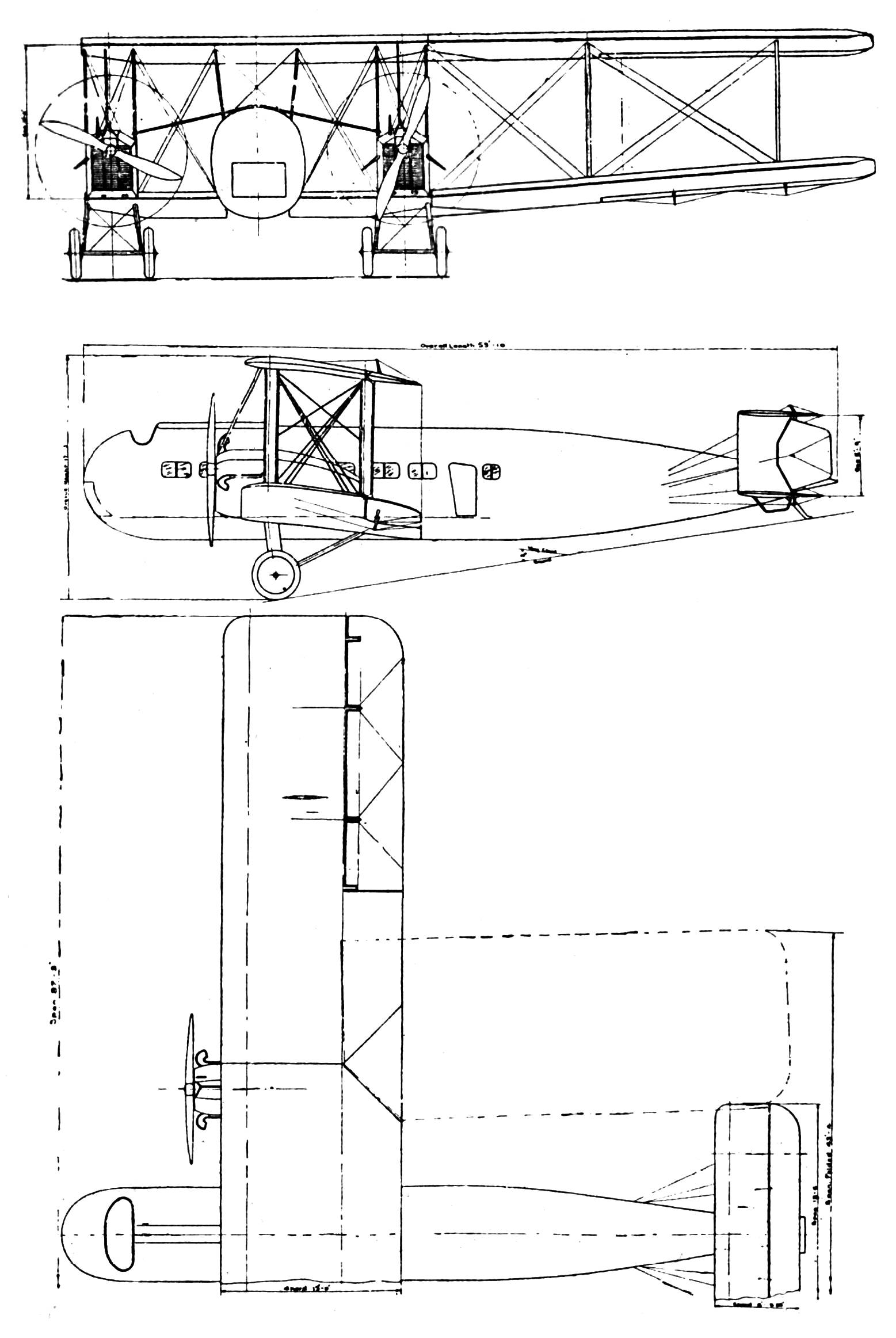
Vickers Type 170 Vanguard 3-view drawing from L'Aéronautique November,1922

Data from

General characteristics

- Crew: 2
- Capacity: 22 passengers
- Length: 53 ft 10 in (16.41 m)
- Wingspan: 87 ft 9 in (26.75 m)
- Height: 17 ft 3 in (5.26 m)
- Wing area: 2,182 sq ft (202.7 m^{2})
- Empty weight: 12,040 lb (5,461 kg)
- Gross weight: 18,500 lb (8,391 kg)
- Powerplant: 2 × Rolls-Royce Condor III water-cooled V12 engine, 650 hp (480 kW) each

Performance

- Maximum speed: 112 mph (180 km/h, 97 kn) at sea level
- Service ceiling: 16,400 ft (5,000 m)
- Time to altitude: 10.5 min to 5,000 ft (1,500 m)

== Video ==
- Newsreel footage of Vickers Type 170 Vanguard in flight

== See also ==
Related development

- Vickers Victoria

Related lists

- List of aircraft of Imperial Airways
