= Military transport aircraft =

Aircraft designed to carry military cargo and personnel

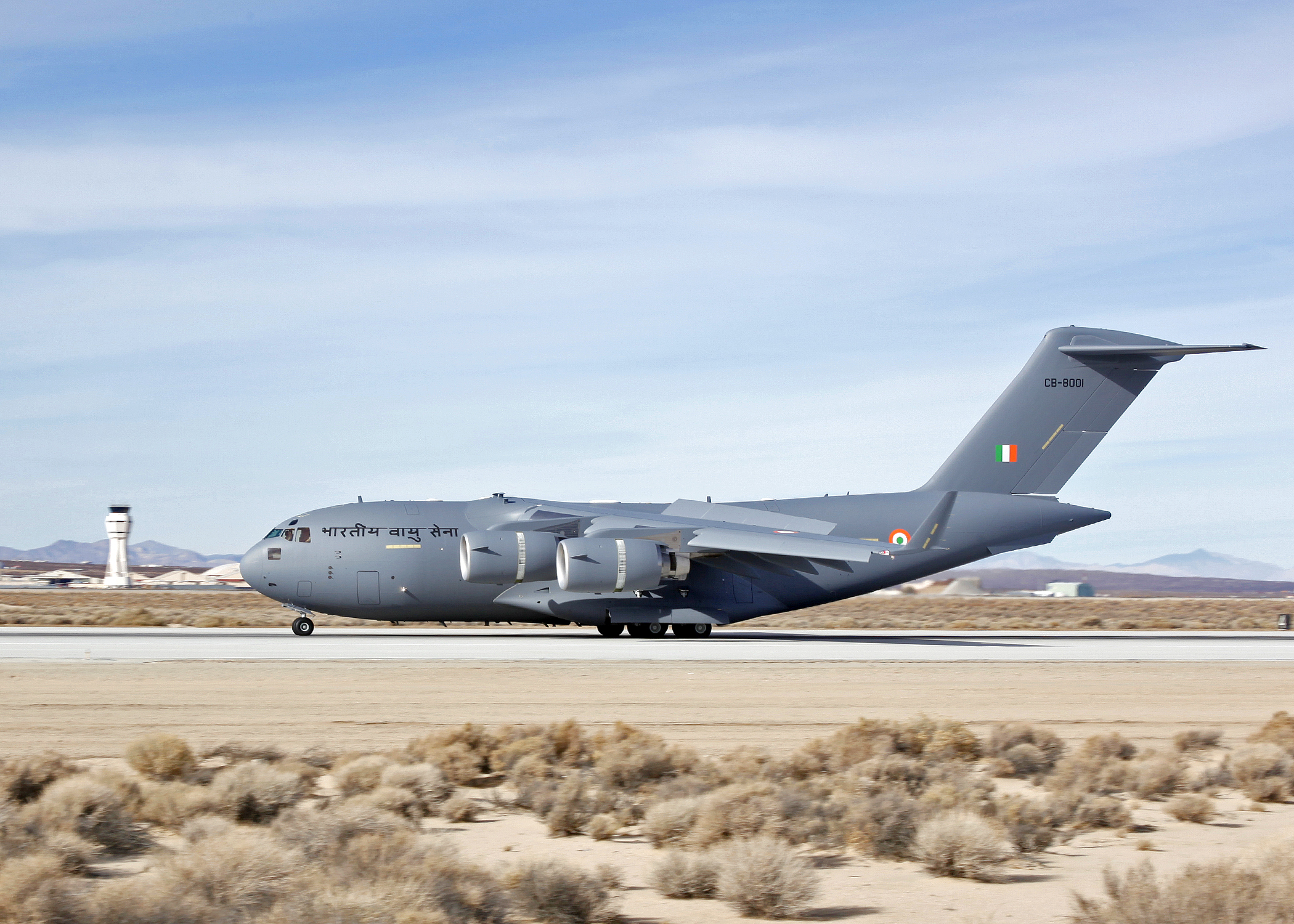
An Indian Air Force C-17 Globemaster III at the Edwards Air Force Base, California

A military transport aircraft, military cargo aircraft or airlifter is a military-owned transport aircraft used to support military operations by airlifting troops and military equipment. Transport aircraft are crucial to maintaining supply lines to forward bases that are difficult to reach by ground or waterborne access, and can be used for both strategic and tactical missions. They are also often used for civilian emergency relief missions by transporting humanitarian aid.

== Airframes ==
=== Fixed-wing ===
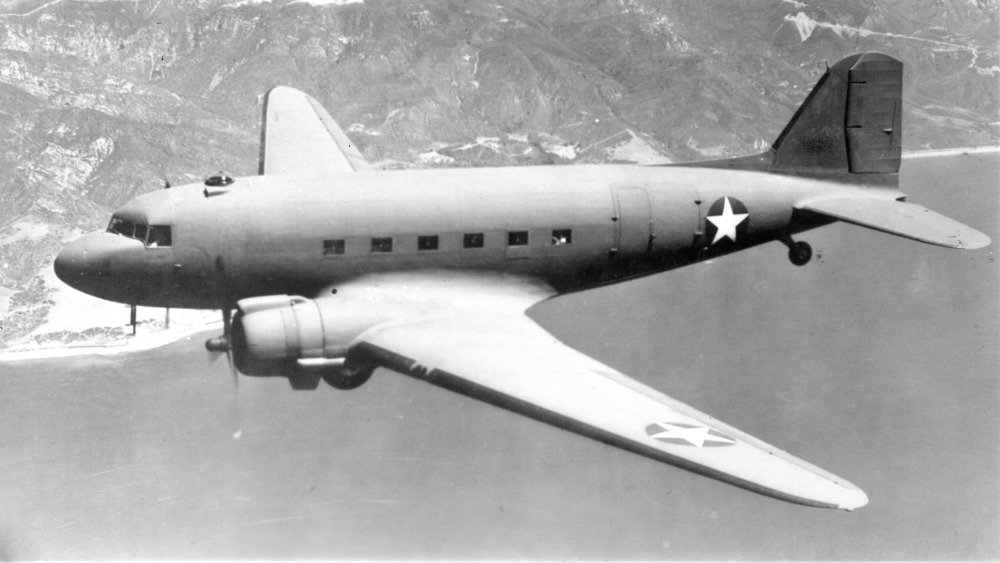
A Douglas C-47 Skytrain, derived from the Douglas DC-3

Military transport aeroplanes are defined in terms of their range capability as strategic airlift or tactical airlift to reflect the needs of the land forces which they most often support. These roughly correspond to the commercial flight length distinctions: Eurocontrol defines short-haul routes as shorter than 1,500 km (810 nmi), long-haul routes as longer than 4,000 km (2,200 nmi) and medium-haul between.

The military glider is an unpowered tactical air transport which has been used in some campaigns to transport troops and/or equipment to the battle front.

=== Rotary-wing ===
Military transport helicopters are used in places where the use of conventional aircraft is impossible. For example, the military transport helicopter is the primary transport asset of US Marines deploying from amphibious assault ships. The landing possibilities of helicopters are almost unlimited; even when landing is impossible, such as in densely packed jungle, the ability of the helicopter to hover allows troops to deploy by abseiling and roping.

Transport helicopters are operated in assault, medium and heavy classes. Air assault helicopters are usually the smallest of the transport types, and designed to move an infantry squad or section and their equipment. Helicopters in the assault role are generally armed for self-protection both in transit and for suppression of the landing zone. This armament may be in the form of door gunners, or the modification of the helicopter with stub wings and pylons to carry missiles and rocket pods. For example, the Sikorsky S-70, fitted with the ESSM (External Stores Support System), and the Hip E variant of the Mil Mi-8 can carry as much disposable armament as some dedicated attack helicopters.

Medium transport helicopters are generally capable of moving up to a platoon of infantry, or transporting towed artillery or light vehicles either internally or as underslung roles. Unlike the assault helicopter they are usually not expected to land directly in a contested landing zone, but are used to reinforce and resupply landing zones taken by the initial assault wave. Examples include the unarmed versions of the Mil Mi-8, Super Puma, CH-46 Sea Knight, and NH90.

Heavy lift helicopters are the largest and most capable of the transport types, currently limited in service to the CH-53 Sea Stallion and related CH-53E Super Stallion, CH-47 Chinook, Mil Mi-26, and SA 321 Super Frelon. Capable of lifting up to 80 troops and moving small Armoured fighting vehicles (usually as slung loads but also internally), these helicopters operate in the tactical transport role in much the same way as small fixed wing turboprop air-lifters. The lower speed, range and increased fuel consumption of helicopters are offset by their not requiring a runway.

== Payload comparison ==
Country	Aircraft	Payload t	Max takeoff weight kg (lb)	Cargo hold Length m (ft)	Cargo hold Width m (ft)	Cargo hold Height m (ft)	Ferry Range (no payload) km (nmi)	Range with max payload km (nmi)	Range with specified payload km (nmi)	Range with specified payload km (nmi)
Soviet Union (Ukraine)	Antonov An-225	247	640,000 (1,410,000)	43.35 (142.2)	6.4 (21)	4.4 (14)	15,400 (8,300)		4,000 (2,200) (w/200,000 kg payload)	
Soviet Union (Ukraine)	Antonov An-124	150	402,000 (886,000)	36 (118)	6.4 (21)	4.4 (14)	14,000 (7,600)	3,700 (2,000)	8,400 (4,500) (w/80,000 kg payload)	11,500 (6,200) (w/40,000 kg payload)
United States	Lockheed C-5 Galaxy	129.274	381,018 (840,001)	37 (121)	5.8 (19)	4.1 (13)	13,000 (7,000)	4,260 (2,300)	8,900 (4,800) (w/54,431 kg payload)	
Soviet Union (Ukraine)	Antonov An-22	80	250,000 (550,000)	32.7 (107)	4.44 (14.6)	4.44 (14.6)		5,000 (2,700)	10,950 (5,910) (w/45,000 kg payload)	
United States	Boeing C-17 Globemaster III	77.5	265,352 (585,001)	26.83 (88.0)	5.49 (18.0)	3.76 (12.3)	11,540 (6,230)		4,482 (2,420) (w/71,000 kg payload)	
China	Xi'an Y-20	66	220,000 (490,000)	20 (66)	4 (13)	4 (13)			7,800 (4,200) (w/55,000 kg payload)	
Soviet Union (Uzbekistan)	Ilyushin Il-76	60	190,000 (420,000)	24.54 (80.5)	3.45 (11.3)	3.4 (11)	9,300 (5,000)		4,400 (2,400) (w/52,000 kg payload)	
Europe	Airbus A330 MRTT	45	233,000 (514,000)	45 (148)	5.28 (17.3)	2.54 (8.3)	14,816 (8,000)			
Europe	Airbus A400M Atlas	37	141,000 (311,000)	17.71 (58.1)	4 (13)	3.85 (12.6) rear section：4 (13)	8,900 (4,800)	3,300 (1,800)	4,500 (2,400) (w/30,000 kg payload)	6,400 (3,500) (w/20,000 kg payload)
Japan	Kawasaki C-2	36	141,000 (311,000)	16 (52)	4 (13)	4 (13)	9,800 (5,300)	4,500 (2,400)	5,700 (3,100) (w/30,000 kg payload)	7,600 (4,100) (w/20,000 kg payload)
Brazil	Embraer C-390	26	86,999 (191,800)	12.7 (42)	3.45 (11.3)	2.95 (9.7) rear section：3.2 (10)	6,240 (3,370)	2,000 (1,100)	2,720 (1,470) (w/23,000 kg payload)	5,020 (2,710) (w/14,000 kg payload)
China	Shaanxi Y-9	23	65,000 (143,000)	16.2 (53)	3.2 (10)	2.35 (7.7)	5,800 (3,100)			
Soviet Union	Mil Mi-26	20	56,000 (123,000)	12 (39)	3.3 (11)	2.9 (9.5)	800 (430)			
United States	Lockheed Martin C-130J	19.8	70,370 (155,140)	12.5 (41)	3.05 (10.0)	2.75 (9.0)	3,334 (1,800)		3,300 (1,800) (w/15,422 kg payload)	
Ukraine	Antonov An-178	16 (18 max)	51,000 (112,000)	13.21 (43.3)	2.73 (9.0)	2.73 (9.0)	5,500 (3,000)			
United States	Sikorsky CH-53K	15.876	39,916 (88,000)	9.14 (30.0)	2.46 (8.1)	2 (6.6)	1,851 (999)	850 (460)	203 (110) (radius w/1,2247 kg)	
Italy	Alenia C-27J Spartan	11.6 max	32,500 (71,700)	8.35 (27.4)	3.33 (10.9)	2.59 (8.5)	5,926 (3,200)	1,759 (950)	5,056 (2,730) (w/4,536 kg payload)	
United States	Boeing CH-47 Chinook	10.886	24,494 (54,000)	9.14 (30.0)	2.53 (8.3)	1.98 (6.5)	2,252 (1,216)	740 (400)	306 (165) (combat radius)	
United States	Bell Boeing V-22 Osprey	10	27,442 (60,499)	7.41 (24.3)	1.8 (5.9)	1.83 (6.0)	4,130 (2,230)	1,628 (879) (w/3,485 kg payload)		
Spain	Airbus C295	7 (9.25 max)	23,200 (51,100)	12.69 (41.6)	2.7 (8.9)	1.9 (6.2)	5,000 (2,700)	1,555 (840)	4,587 (2,477) (w/2,940 kg payload)	

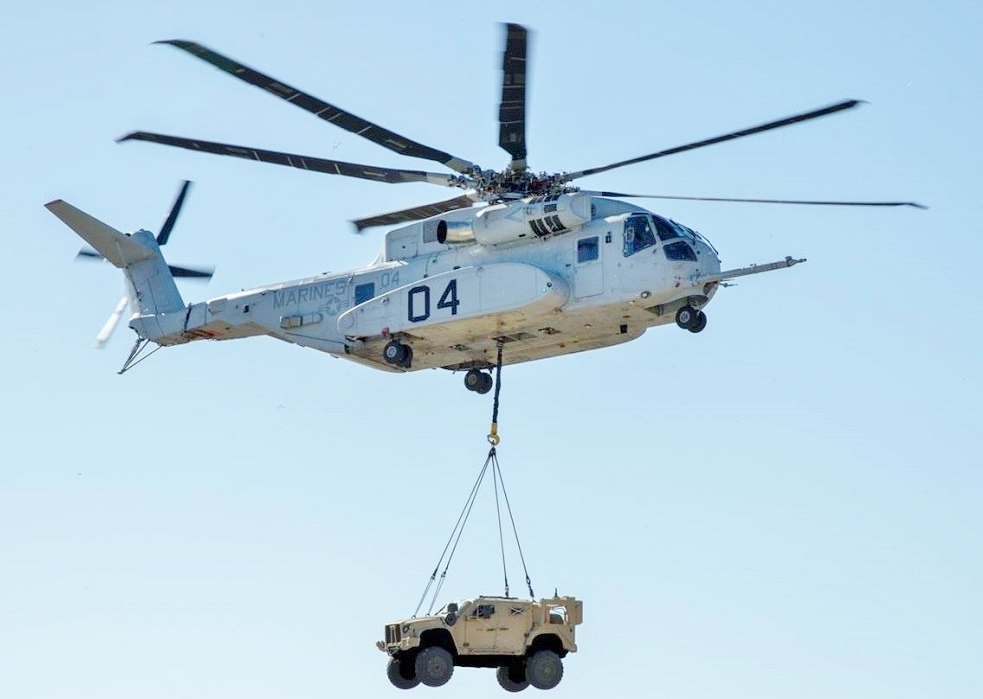
The Sikorsky CH-53K

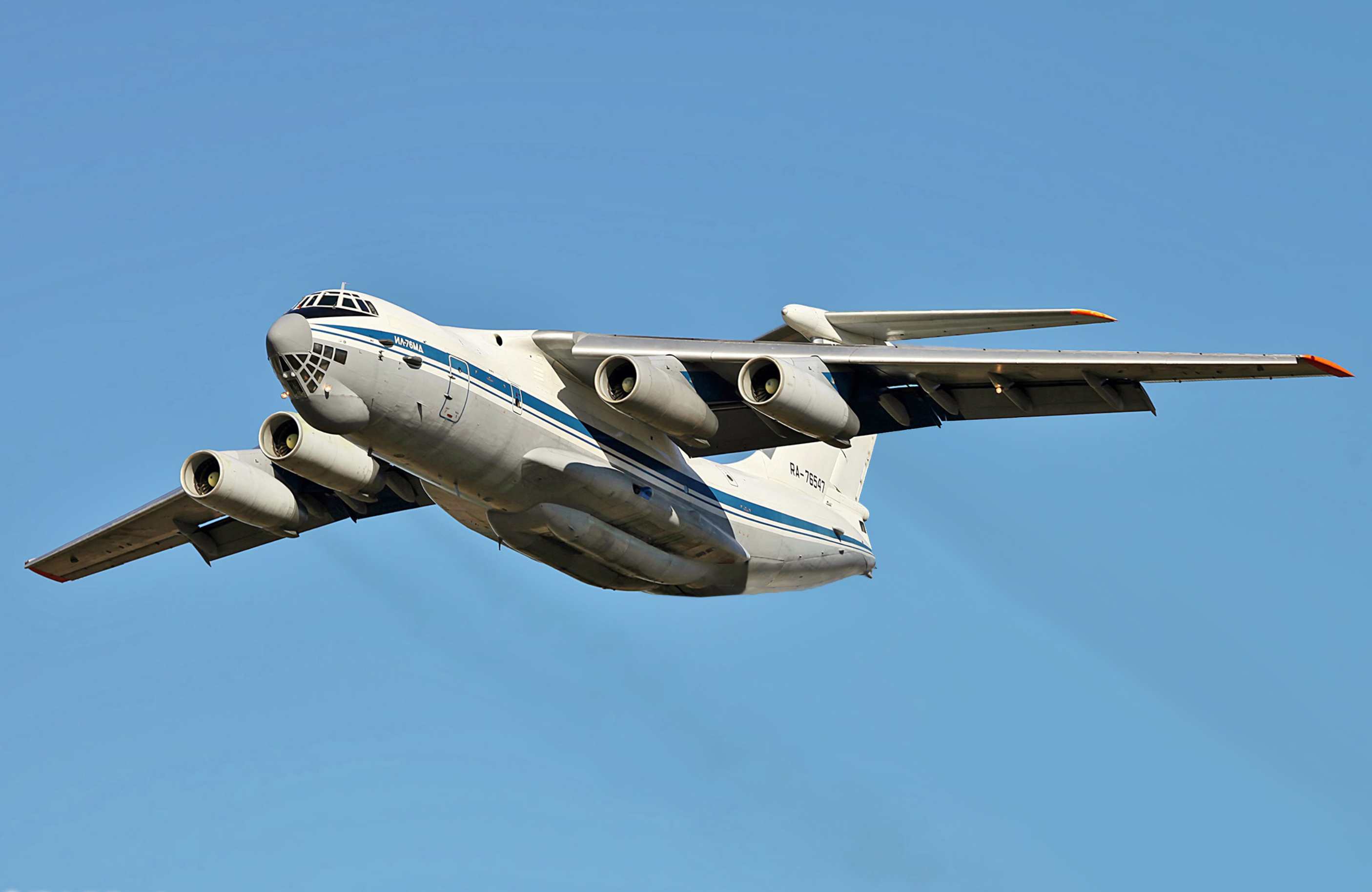
A 1970s Ilyushin Il-76 airlifter designed for both strategic and tactical military operations

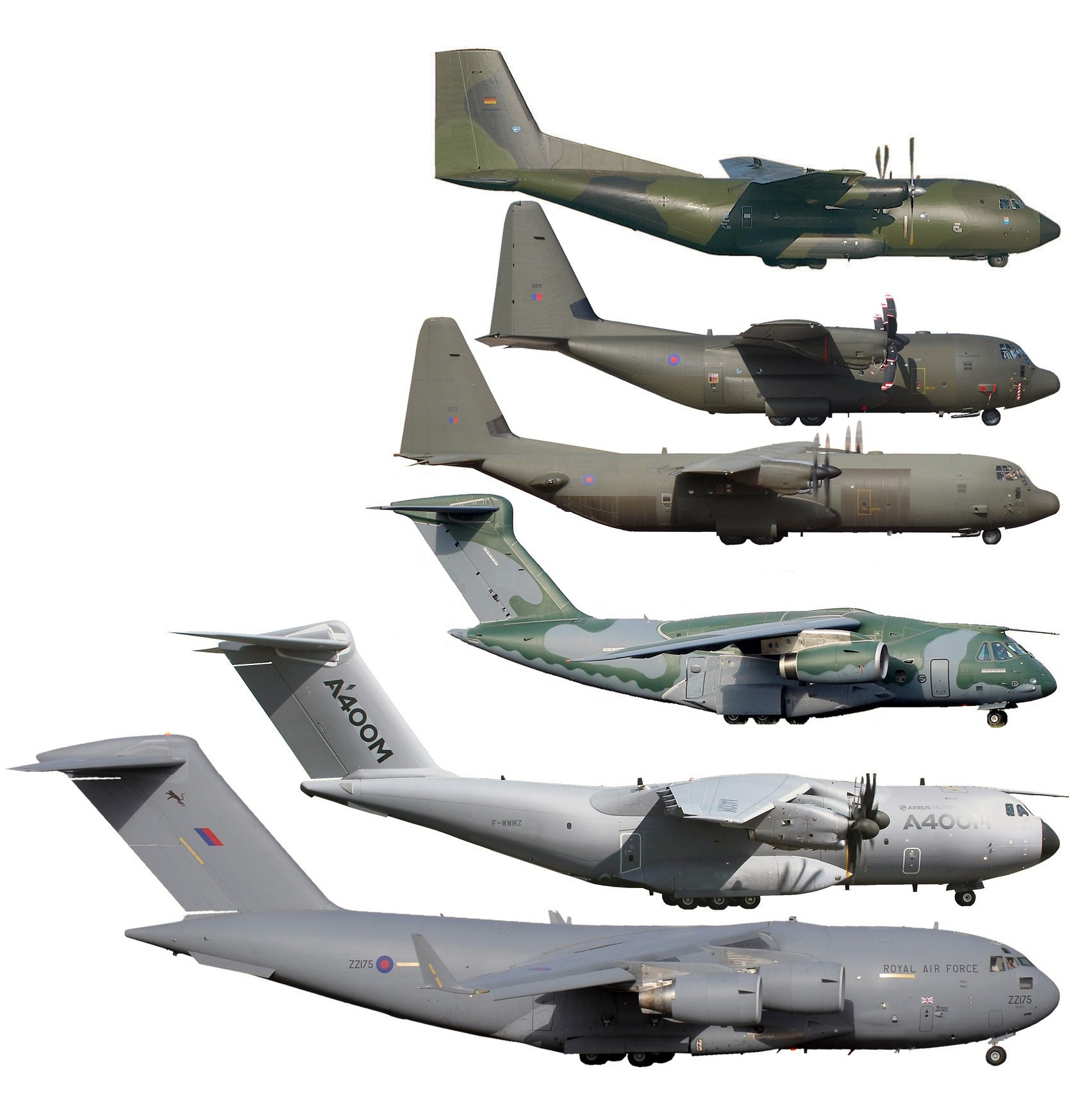
From top to bottom, a size comparison of the C-160, C-130J, C-130J-30, C-390, A400M and C-17

== See also ==
- Airlift
- Cargo aircraft
- Liaison aircraft
- List of military transport aircraft
- Loadmaster
- Troop ship
