= Vickers Victoria =

1922 airlifter

Victoria
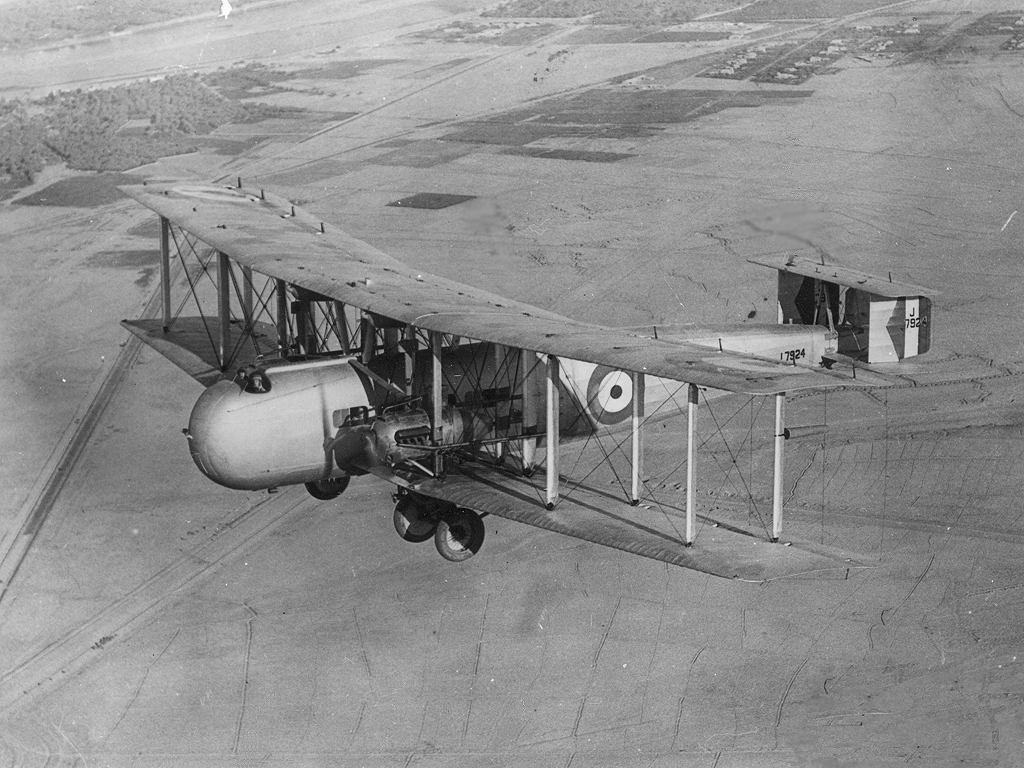

General information
- Type: Cargo/troop carrier
- Manufacturer: Vickers
- Primary user: RAF
- Number built: 97

History
- First flight: 22 August 1922
- Retired: 1935
- Developed from: Vickers Virginia
- Variant: Vickers Valentia
- Developed into: Vickers Vanguard

The Vickers Type 56 Victoria was a British biplane freighter and troop transport aircraft used by the Royal Air Force. The Victoria flew for the first time in 1922 and was selected for production over the Armstrong Whitworth Awana.

== Design and development ==
The Victoria was a twin-engined biplane transport with a conventional landing gear with a tailskid. The design mated a similar fuselage of the earlier Vernon transport with the wing of the Virginia bomber, which was developed in parallel. It was also powered by two Napier Lion engines. The enclosed cabin had room for 24 troops on collapsible canvas seats arranged along the sides of the fuselage.

In April 1921 two prototypes were ordered by the Air Ministry to Specification 5/20. The first prototype, allocated serial number J6860, was built as a Type 56 and designated as Victoria I, the second J6861 was built as a Type 81 Victoria II. The Type 56 had two 450 hp (340 kW) Napier Lion engines with large frontal radiators and were fitted directly onto the lower mainplanes, the fuel tanks were placed under the inboard section of the bottom mainplane. The prototype J6860 first flew from Brooklands, Surrey on 22 August 1922. The Type 81 flew in January 1923, and initially differed only in having the fuel tanks under the top mainplane. It was later modified by replacing the flat sided engine cowling with more streamlined nacelles with the radiators between the undercarriage legs, as fitted in the Virginia II bomber.

In March 1925, it was decided to place an order for 15 production aircraft. By this time, the Virginia design had evolved to incorporate swept-back wings, and the production Victoria IIIs incorporated this change. Another improvement first introduced in the Virginia was the introduction of metal structures instead of the all-wooden airframes of the early aircraft, with an order being placed for a prototype Victoria with a metal structure (serial number J9250) in September 1927, this being delivered in October 1928. The metal airframe proved much more suitable for the hot and humid areas where the Victoria served, with Victoria IV and Vs with metal structures produced by conversion and new production respectively. The final version was the Mark VI, which substituted modern, more powerful Bristol Pegasus radial engines for the Napier Lions. The Vickers Valentia was a further improved version with a stronger structure, capable of operating at higher weights.

Ninety-seven Victorias were built, many of which were later converted into Valentias.

== Operational history ==
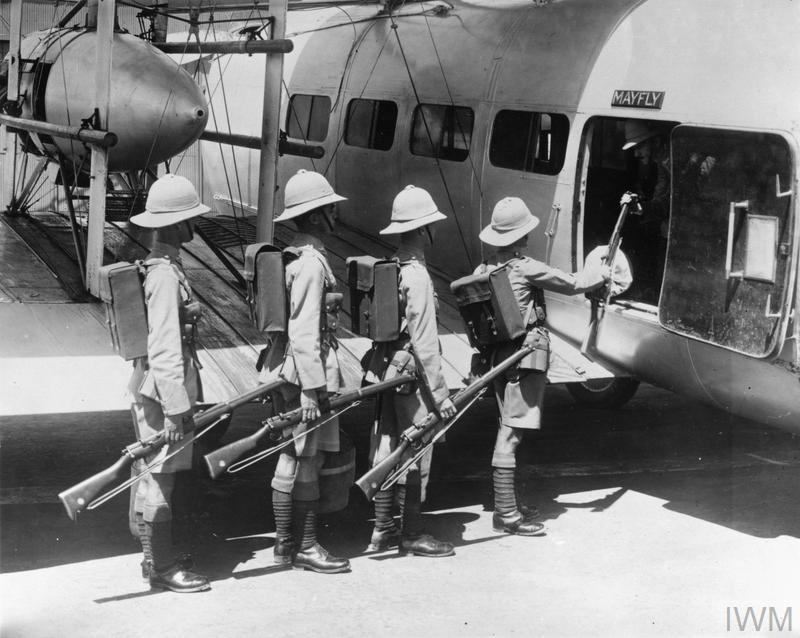
Troops emplaning on a Vickers Victoria.

Deliveries of the Victoria III started on 23 February 1926, with the type replacing Vernons and Vimys with 70 Squadron in Iraq and 216 Squadron in Egypt that year. Eight Victorias of 70 Squadron played an important part in the Kabul Airlift of November 1928–February 1929, when in severe winter conditions, RAF aircraft evacuated diplomatic staff and their dependents together with members of the Afghan royal family endangered by a civil war. Victorias were used to ferry troops to potential trouble spots in Iraq and elsewhere, flying reinforcements to Palestine in 1929 and Jordan in 1930.

In October 1931, seven Victorias were used to airlift 150 troops from Cairo to Nicosia, Cyprus. This was in response to serious rioting in the city by crowds calling for Enosis, a union between Cyprus and Greece. This had seen the Governor's residence being attacked and burnt-down.

The Victorias of the two operational squadrons also made a number of long range training flights, beginning with a return trip from Cairo to Aden in 1926 On 12 January 1931, three Victorias of 216 Squadron left Cairo for a return trip to Cape Town, commanded by Hubert Jones Penderel. They arrived at Entebbe on the 17 January where troop-carrying exercises were undertaken with soldiers of the King's African Rifles. After further stops at Nairobi and Tabora, they reached Cape Town on 7 February. These trips helped to pioneer air routes for Imperial Airways' Handley Page HP.42 airliners.

One Victoria was used as a blind flying trainer by the Central Flying School, being fitted with two sets of controls and instruments in a blanked off cabin.

The Victoria continued in service until 1935, although many were converted to Valentias, which remained in use until well into the Second World War.

== Variants ==
Type 56 Victoria Mk I
The first prototype. Powered by two 450 hp (340 kW) Napier Lion IAX W12 engines.
Type 81 Victoria Mk II
The second prototype.
Type 117 Victoria Mk III
The first production version. Military transport aircraft for the RAF. Powered by 450 hp Napier Lion II engines. 46 built.
Type 145 Victoria Mk IV
Metal wing structure. One prototype powered by Bristol Jupiter radials. Thirteen Lion-engined conversions from earlier marks.
Type 169 Victoria Mk V
New production aircraft with metal structure, powered by two 570 hp (430 kW) Napier Lion XIB engines. 37 new-built.
Type 262 Victoria Mk VI
Final production - powered by 660 hp (490 kW) Bristol Pegasus IIL3 engines instead of Lions. 11 new-build, 23 by conversion.

== Operators ==
Vickers Victoria

United Kingdom

- Royal Air Force
  - No. 70 Squadron RAF (1924-1935 at RAF Hinaidi, Iraq)
  - No. 216 Squadron RAF (1925-1935 at RAF Heliopolis, Egypt)

== Specifications (Victoria V) ==
Data from Aircraft of the Royal Air Force

General characteristics

- Crew: 2
- Capacity: 22 troops
- Length: 59 ft 6 in (18.14 m)
- Wingspan: 87 ft 4 in (26.62 m)
- Height: 17 ft 9 in (5.41 m)
- Wing area: 2,178 sq ft (202.3 m^{2})
- Empty weight: 10,030 lb (4,550 kg)
- Gross weight: 17,760 lb (8,056 kg)
- Powerplant: 2 × Napier Lion XI 3-bank 12-cylinder piston engines, popular called 'triple four', 570 hp (430 kW) each

Performance

- Maximum speed: 110 mph (180 km/h, 96 kn) at sea level
- Range: 770 mi (1,240 km, 670 nmi)
- Service ceiling: 16,200 ft (4,900 m)
- Time to altitude: 11 min to 4,920 ft (1,500 m)

== See also ==
Related lists

- List of aircraft of the Royal Air Force
