= Vickers Vernon =

British biplane troop carrier (1921–1927)

Vernon
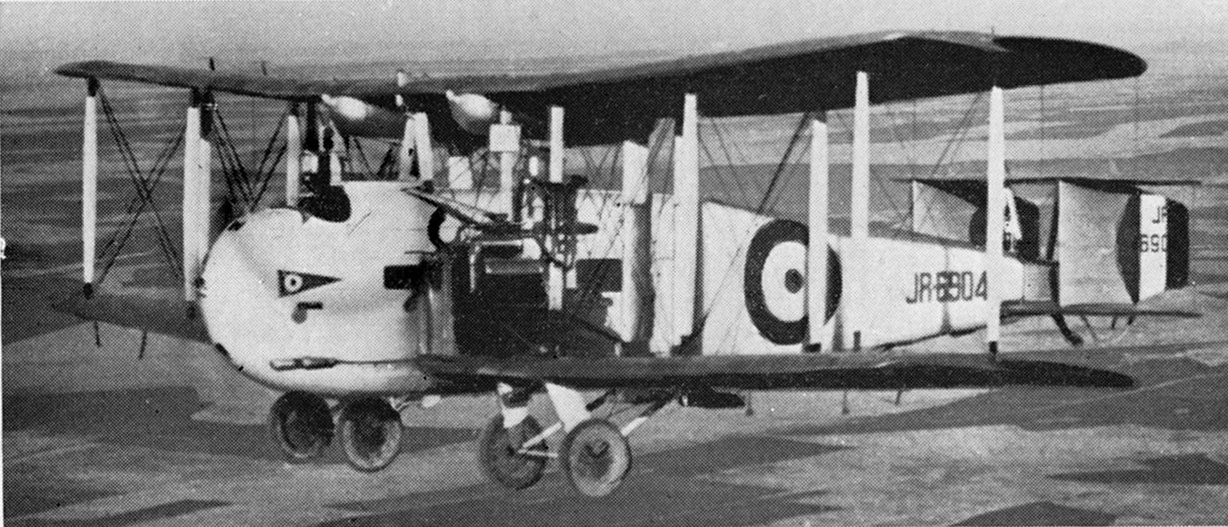
- Vernon of 70 Squadron RAF, powered by Rolls-Royce Eagle engines.

General information
- Type: Transport
- Manufacturer: Vickers
- Primary user: Royal Air Force
- Number built: 55

History
- Introduction date: 1921
- Retired: 1927
- Developed from: Vickers Vimy Commercial

The Vickers Vernon was a British biplane troop carrier used by the Royal Air Force. It entered service in 1921 and was the first dedicated troop transport of the RAF.

The Vernon was a development of the Vickers Vimy Commercial, a passenger variant of the famous Vickers Vimy bomber, and was powered by twin Napier Lion engines or Rolls-Royce Eagle VIII engines. 55 were built.

In February 1923, Vernons of Nos. 45 and 70 Squadrons RAF airlifted nearly 500 troops to Kirkuk, Iraq after the civilian area of that town had been overrun by Kurdish forces. This was the first-ever strategic airlift of troops.

Vernons of No. 45 Squadron had bomb racks and sights fitted. In May 1924 the squadron was officially designated No. 45 (Bombing) Sqdn.

Vernons were replaced by Vickers Victorias from 1927.

== Variants ==
Vernon Mk I
military transport aircraft powered by two 360 hp (270 kW) V-12 Rolls-Royce Eagle VIII piston engines.
Vernon Mk II
military transport aircraft powered by two 450 hp (340 kW) W-12 Napier Lion II piston engines.
Vernon Mk III
military transport aircraft powered by two high compression 525 hp (391 kW) W-12 Napier Lion III piston engines.

== Operators ==
United Kingdom

- Royal Air Force
  - No. 45 Squadron RAF
  - No. 70 Squadron RAF

== Specifications ==
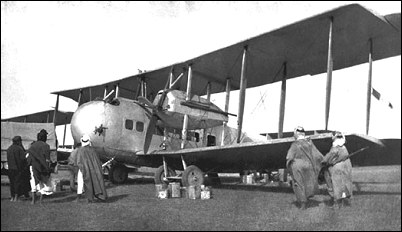

Data from Aircraft of the Royal Air Force

General characteristics

- Crew: 3
- Capacity: 11 passengers
- Length: 42 ft 8 in (13.00 m)
- Wingspan: 68 ft 1 in (20.75 m)
- Height: 13 ft 3 in (4.04 m)
- Wing area: 1,330 sq ft (124 m^{2})
- Empty weight: 7,981 lb (3,620 kg)
- Gross weight: 12,544 lb (5,690 kg)
- Powerplant: 2 × Napier Lion water-cooled 12-cylinder broad-arrow engine, 450 hp (340 kW) each

Performance

- Maximum speed: 118 mph (190 km/h, 103 kn) at ground level
- Cruise speed: 75 mph (121 km/h, 65 kn)
- Range: 320 mi (510 km, 280 nmi) at 80 mph (70 kn; 130 km/h)
- Service ceiling: 11,700 ft (3,600 m)
- Time to altitude: 13 min 30 s to 6,000 ft (1,800 m)

Armament

- Bombs: Provision for bombs

== See also ==
Related development

- Vickers Vimy

Related lists

- List of aircraft of the Royal Air Force
