= No. 216 Squadron RAF =

Squadron of the Royal Air Force based at RAF Waddington, Lincolnshire

- Squadron badge
- Active: 5 October 1917 – 1 April 1918 (RNAS); 1 April 1918 – 27 June 1975 (RAF); 1 July 1979 – 20 March 2014; 1 April 2020 – present
- Country: United Kingdom
- Branch: Royal Air Force
- Type: Drone swarm technology
- Role: Test & Evaluation
- Home station: RAF Waddington
- Mottos: CCXVI dona ferens (Latin for '216 bearing gifts')
- Battle honours: Independent Force and Germany (1917–1918)*; Egypt and Libya (1940–1942)*; Greece (1940–1941)*; Syria (1941)*; El Alamein (1942)*; El Hamma (1943); North Africa (1943)*; Mediterranean (1943); Manipur (1944); North Burma (1944)*; South East Europe (1944–1945)*; Kosovo (1999); Afghanistan (2001–2014); Iraq (2003); Iraq (2003–2011); Libya (2011); * Honours marked with an asterisk may be emblazoned on the Squadron Standard

Insignia
- Squadron badge: An eagle, wings elevated, holding a bomb in its claws. Approved by King Edward VIII in May 1936.
- Squadron codes: VT (Apr 1939 – Sep 1939); SH (Sep 1939 – Sep 1941)

Number 216 Squadron is a squadron of the Royal Air Force based at RAF Waddington, Lincolnshire, since reforming on 1 April 2020 and is tasked with testing future drone swarm technology. It had previously operated Lockheed TriStar K1, KC1 and C2s from RAF Brize Norton, Oxfordshire, between November 1984 and March 2014.

== History ==
=== First World War ===
No. 216 Squadron's beginnings can be traced back to August 1917 when No. 7 Squadron of the Royal Naval Air Service (RNAS) sent a detachment of four Handley Page O/100 to Redcar in order to fly anti-submarine missions. Moving to Manston in October, the unit was re-designated as 'A' Squadron. At the end of October, 'A' Squadron was deployed to Ochey, France, joining No. 41 Wing as a strategic night bomber squadron. On 8 January 1918, 'A' Squadron was re-designated as No. 16 Squadron (RNAS). In March, the squadron began to convert to the Handley Page O/400. On the night of 24/25 March, an aircraft from the squadron carried out an 8 and a half hour attack on Cologne. On 1 April, while operating out of Villeseneux (south east of Reims), No. 16 Squadron (RNAS) became No. 216 Squadron of the Royal Air Force.

=== Interwar ===
Between the two World Wars the squadron used Vickers Vimy, Vickers Victoria and Vickers Type 264 Valentia aircraft on transport duties around the Middle East. No. 216 Squadron had their squadron badge approved by King Edward VIII in May 1936.

=== Second World War ===
During the Second World War, with a few exceptions, such as the attacks from 17 to 21 June 1940 by a single aircraft of No. 216 Squadron on the airfields of El Adem and Tobruk, the unit was principally a transport squadron, operating the Vickers Type 264 Valentia, Bristol Bombay, de Havilland DH86, Lockheed Hudson and Douglas Dakota. It spent a lengthy time deployed to Cairo from November 1942 to July 1945.

=== Post-War ===
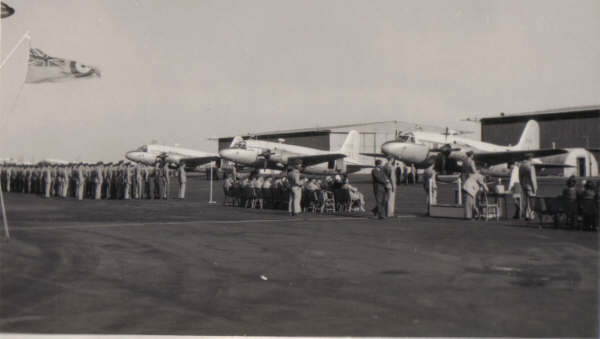
No. 216 Squadron leaving RAF Fayid (Egypt) for the UK in 1955

In late 1949, the Dakotas were replaced by Vickers Valettas transport aircraft; in 1955 the squadron moved to RAF Lyneham from RAF Fayid in Egypt to operate the De Havilland Comet C.2 jet airliner until 27 June 1975, when No. 216 Squadron disbanded after 58 years of service.

The squadron reformed at RAF Honington on 1 July 1979 as a maritime strike squadron assigned to Supreme Allied Commander Atlantic (SACLANT) with twelve Blackburn Buccaneer S.2 aircraft transferred from the Fleet Air Arm's 809 Naval Air Squadron. These aircraft had been embarked on HMS Ark Royal until flying off for the last time in November 1978 for a delivery flight from the carrier in the Mediterranean to RAF St Athan. Designated Buccaneer S2A by the RAF, they were equipped with twelve WE.177A nuclear bombs, free-falling conventional HE bombs and Martel missiles for non-nuclear strike. However, on 7 February 1980, a No. XV Squadron Buccaneer crashed after a wing failed in flight during the Red Flag exercise in the USA. The resulting grounding and inspections saw the size of the Buccaneer fleet reduced, with the result that No. 216 Squadron had its assets merged with No. 12 (Bomber) Squadron barely a year after its reformation, however the squadron was not officially disbanded.

=== Lockheed TriStar (1984–2014) ===
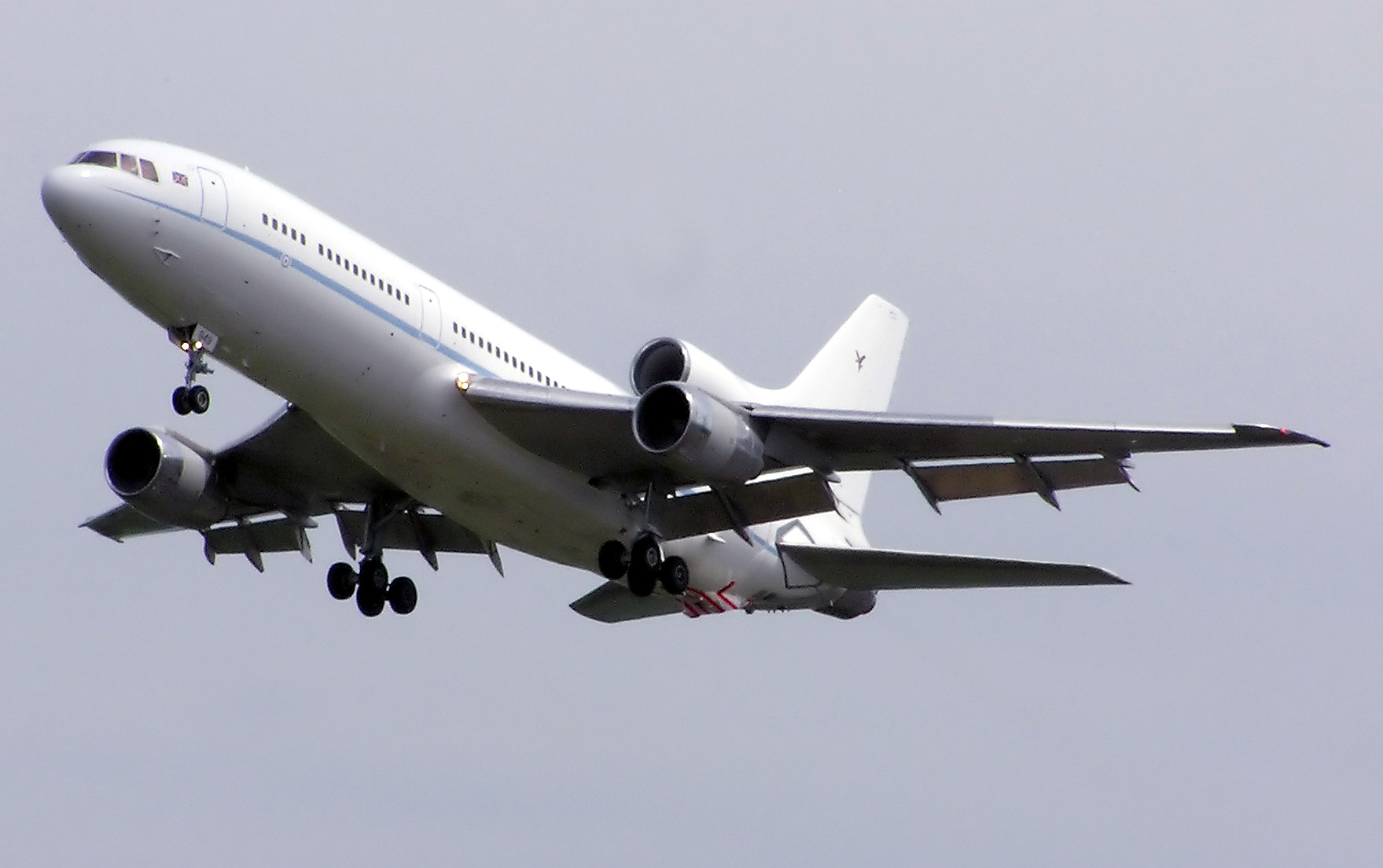
No. 216 Squadron TriStar K.1 ZD949 departing from Kemble Airfield, June 2005

Following the Falklands War, the RAF found itself lacking in the strategic transport capabilities required to sustain the expanded military presence there; this shortfall was filled initially by chartered British Airways Boeing 747s and Britannia Airways Boeing 767s. To address this, in December 1982 the RAF purchased six former British Airways Lockheed TriStar 500s. The first TriStar (ZD949) was leased back to British Airways on 29 March 1983 until November, eventually undergoing conversion at Cambridge Airport by Marshall Aerospace in 1986. In 1984, the RAF purchased a further three TriStar 500s from Pan-Am.

No. 216 Squadron was reactivated on 1 November 1984 at RAF Brize Norton to operate the Lockheed TriStar. The aircraft were operated initially in the air-transport role but the fleet's role was eventually expanded to air-to-air refuelling. On 24 March 1986, TriStar KC.1 ZD953 became the first aircraft to be handed over to the squadron.

No. 216 Squadron deployed the TriStar fleet in support of many high-profile missions including the Gulf War (for which the aircraft received a desert paint scheme), Operation Allied Force (Kosovo), Operation Veritas and Operation Herrick (Afghanistan), Operation Telic (Iraq 2003) and Operation Ellamy (Libya).

The squadron was disbanded on 20 March 2014 at RAF Brize Norton, with the last Tristar sortie being flown on 24 March. In October 2017, it was announced that Queen Elizabeth II had approved the award of 'Iraq 2003–2011' and 'Libya 2011' battle honours to No. 216 Squadron (without the right to emblazon).

=== Drones and StormShroud (2020 onwards) ===
On 17 July 2019, at the Air & Space Power Conference, the RAF announced that No. 216 Squadron would reform to become an experimental unit to test future drone swarm technology. No. 216 Squadron formally stood up on 1 April 2020 at RAF Waddington, Lincolnshire. In March 2024, James Cartlidge, the minister for defence procurement, informed Parliament that notwithstanding its formation in 2020, 216 Squadron had "completed [no] tests or trials [of any drones] ... either in-house or with industry" since being reconstituted.

In October 2024, Parliamentary Under-Secretary of State for Defence Luke Pollard said in a written parliamentary answer that the squadron will transition from its role as the swarming drone trials unit "to become the operational delivery squadron for an Autonomous Collaborative Platforms [ACP] capability in 2025." 216 Squadron would initially be a blend of a test and evaluation squadron and a frontline squadron as the aircraft moves from research and development to an operational footing. The role of the drone trials unit passed to 744 Naval Air Squadron as the Joint Uncrewed Air System Test and Evaluation Squadron.

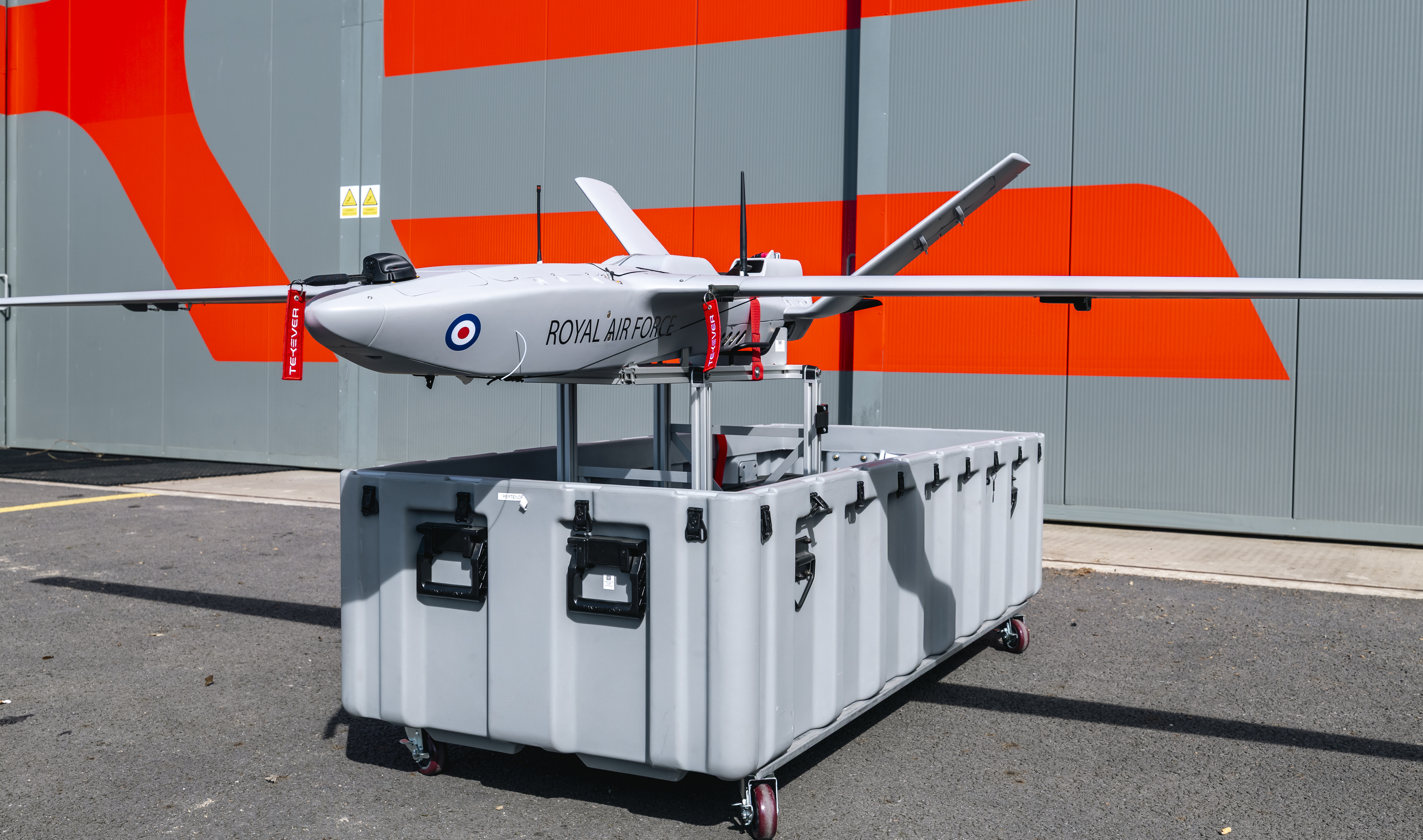
StormShroud, an RAF drone based on the Tekever AR3 platform, carrying Leonardo UK's BriteStorm jammer (2025)

On 2 May 2025 the RAF announced that 216 Squadron had brought into operational service StormShroud, an uncrewed electronic warfare aircraft described as the first of a new family of autonomous collaborative platforms (ACPs). The aircraft is based on the Tekever AR3 small uncrewed air system, fitted with the BriteStorm stand-in jammer developed by Leonardo S.p.A. at Luton, and is intended for the suppression of enemy air defences role, flying ahead of crewed Typhoon and F-35B Lightning aircraft to disrupt hostile radars. Its role has been described as a 'loyal wingman' by Janes.

== Aircraft operated ==
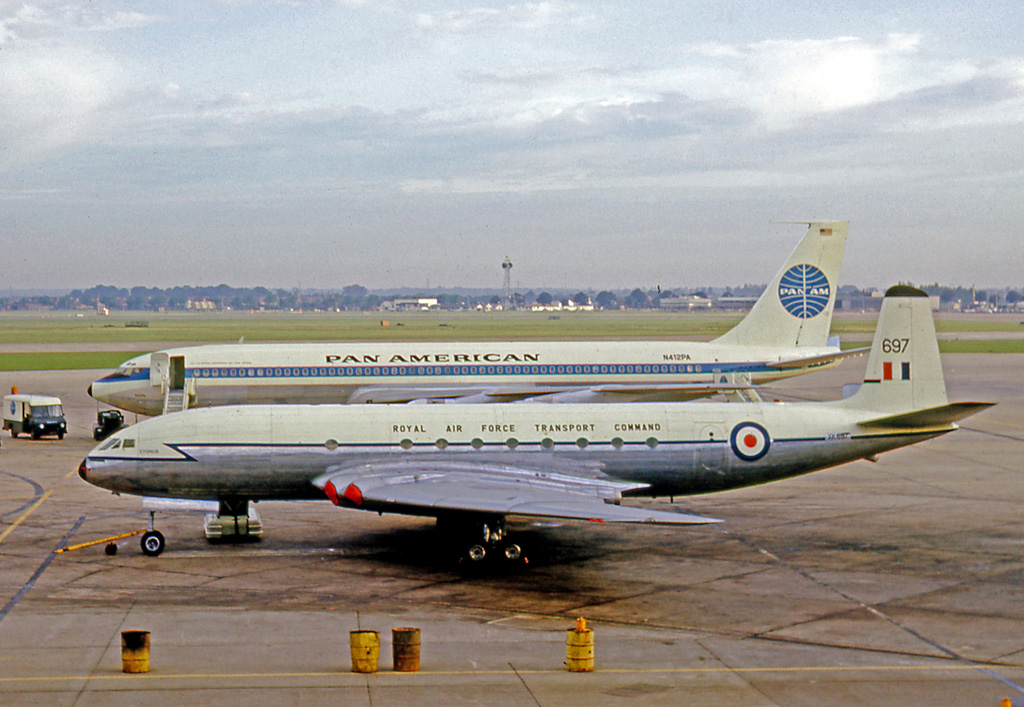
De Havilland Comet C.2 XK697 operating a VIP flight from London Heathrow Airport, June 1965

Aircraft operated include:

- Handley Page Type O/100 (Oct 1917–1918)
- Handley Page Type O/400 (Mar 1918–Oct 1921)
- Airco DH.10 Amiens (Aug 1920–Oct 1922)
- Vickers Vimy (June 1922–Oct 1926)
- Vickers Victoria Mk.II (Dec 1925–Oct 1926)
- Vickers Victoria Mk.III (July 1926–Apr 1935)
- Vickers Victoria Mk.V (Feb 1929–Aug 1934)
- Vickers Victoria Mk.IV (Apr 1929–Apr 1931)
- Vickers Victoria Mk.VI (Apr 1933–Nov 1935)
- Vickers Valentia (Feb 1935–Sep 1941)
- Bristol Bombay Mk.I (Oct 1939–May 1943)
- de Havilland DH86B (Nov 1941–Apr 1942)
- Lockheed Hudson Mk.VI (July 1942–Apr 1943)
- Douglas Dakota (Apr 1943–Dec 1949)
- Vickers Valetta C.1 (Nov 1949–Nov 1955)
- de Havilland Comet C.2 (June 1956–May 1967)
- de Havilland Comet C.4 (Feb 1962–June 1975)
- Blackburn Buccaneer S.2B (July 1979–Aug 1980)
- Hawker Hunter T.7 (1979–1980)
- Lockheed TriStar C.1 (Nov 1984–Sep 1988)
- Lockheed TriStar C.2 (Feb 1985–Mar 2014)
- Lockheed TriStar C.2A (Mar 1985–Aug 2013)
- Lockheed TriStar K.1 (Mar 1986–Mar 2014)
- Lockheed TriStar KC.1 (Feb 1989–Mar 2014)

== See also ==
- List of Royal Air Force aircraft squadrons
