= 94th =

94th is the ordinal form of the number 94. 94th or Ninety-fourth may also refer to:

- A fraction, 1/94, equal to one of 94 equal parts

== Geography ==
- 94th meridian east, a line of longitude
- 94th meridian west, a line of longitude
- 94th Street (Manhattan)

== Military ==
- 94th Brigade (disambiguation)
- 94th Division (disambiguation)
- 94th Regiment (disambiguation)
- 94th Squadron (disambiguation)

== Other ==
- 94th century
- 94th century BC

== See also ==
- 94 (disambiguation)
- April 4, 94th day of the year in a standard year
