= Leipheim =

- Town
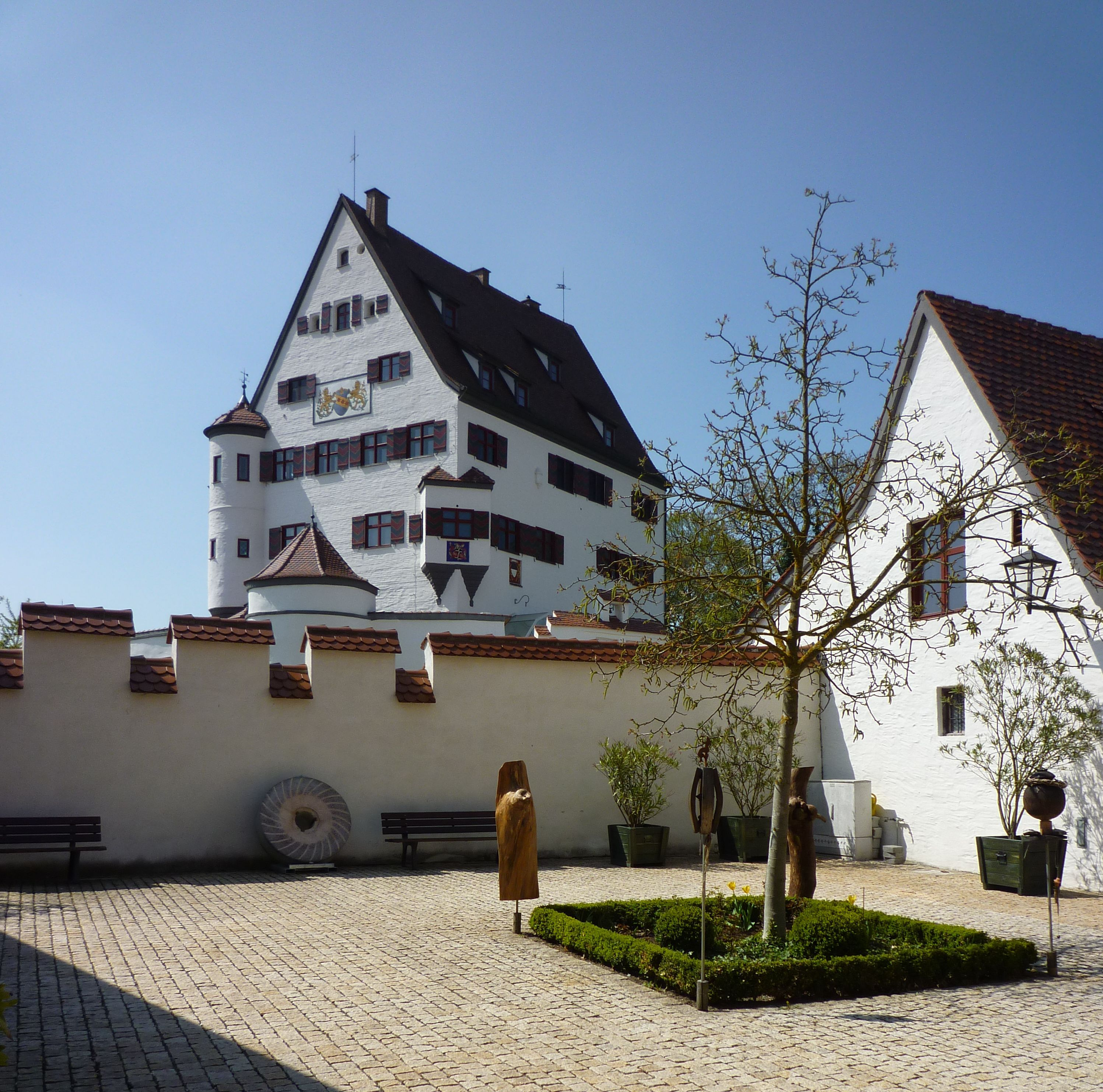
- Castle in Leipheim

- Coat of arms

- Location of Leipheim within Günzburg district
- Interactive map of Leipheim
- Location within Germany Location within Bavaria
- Coordinates: 48°26′56″N 10°13′15″E
- Country: Germany
- State: Bavaria
- Admin. region: Schwaben
- District: Günzburg

Government
  - Mayor (2020–26): Christian Konrad (CSU)

Area
  - Total: 32.15 km^{2} (12.41 sq mi)
- Elevation: 470 m (1,540 ft)

Population (2025-12-31)
  - Total: 7,385
  - Density: 229.7/km^{2} (594.9/sq mi)
- Time zone: UTC+01:00 (CET)
  - Summer (DST): UTC+02:00 (CEST)
- Postal codes: 89340
- Dialling codes: 08221
- Vehicle registration: GZ
- Website: www.leipheim.de

Leipheim (German pronunciation: [ˈlaɪphaɪm]; Swabian: Leiba) is a town in the district of Günzburg, in Bavaria, Germany. It is situated on the Danube, 5 kilometres (3 miles) west of Günzburg, and 17 kilometres (11 miles) northeast of Ulm. The village Riedheim and the hamlet Weissingen are districts of Leipheim. Since 1993, Leipheim has been twinned with the Hungarian town Fonyód.

== History ==
Between 1270 and 1373, Leipheim was owned by the family of Güß von Güssenberg who arranged for it to be granted market privileges in 1327 and town privileges in 1330 through Louis IV (Ludwig the Bavarian). In 1343, ownership was transferred to the Count of Württemberg. In 1453, the Free Imperial City of Ulm purchased the town from Count Ulrich V, Count of Württemberg for 23,000 Gulden. When Ulm converted to Protestantism in 1531, Leipheim officially turned Protestant as well.

During the German Peasants' War in 1525, roughly 5,000 peasants called the Leipheimer Haufen (literally: the Leipheim Bunch) gathered near Leipheim to rise against the city of Ulm and were subsequently defeated by the army of the Swabian League. During the German Mediatisation in 1803, the town was integrated into Bavaria. Leipheim was one of the few possessions of the Free Imperial City of Ulm to remain Bavarian after 1810 when Bavaria was forced to transfer certain borderland back to Württemberg. In the course of the administrative reform of Bavaria in 1818 under King Maximilian I Joseph of Bavaria, the community emerged in its current form.

In 1816/17, following the Napoleonic Wars and long periods of rain and cold, the people of Leipheim suffered famine and hardship. During this time, the city made a promise to celebrate the end of the famine, and in 1818 after a good harvest, they made good on this promise by creating the Kinderfest (literal: festival of children). Up to this day, the festival is held every year on the second weekend of July, incorporating traditional elements commemorating the end of the famine through song and dance, as well as a modern fairground and beer garden atmosphere.

With the construction of the railroad section Ulm-Augsburg in 1853, Leipheim gained further economic significance. In 1937, construction of the autobahn A8 and the motorway bridge crossing the Danube was completed. The air base, which saw the mass production of the cargo glider Messerschmitt Me 321 and the first strategic transport aircraft Messerschmitt Me 323, was built the same year. The first flight of the prototype of the Messerschmitt Me 262 Schwalbe (Swallow), the world's first operational turbojet fighter aircraft took place in Leipheim on July 18, 1942. From 1944, the aircraft was mass-produced (around 800 units).

After the end of World War II in 1945, a displaced persons camp for Jewish survivors of the Holocaust was established on the premises of the former air base. This camp, which sheltered up to 3,150 people, was disbanded in June 1950. After 1957 the area was used for military air traffic again until 1993.

U.S. Army troops, including the 54th Combat Engineer Battalion, were stationed there, at least during the mid-1950s.

The city's coat of arms (a blue shield with a golden diagonal bar and three six-pointed stars in red) has been in use since the 14th century and has first been sourced in 1404. The colors are the ones of the family of Güß von Güssenberg. The coat of arms in its current form first emerged the early 19th century. Recently, Leipheim has adopted a modern logo, the city's signature followed by a red circle with a black exclamation mark inside, which is now being used on all official publications to evoke a corporate identity.

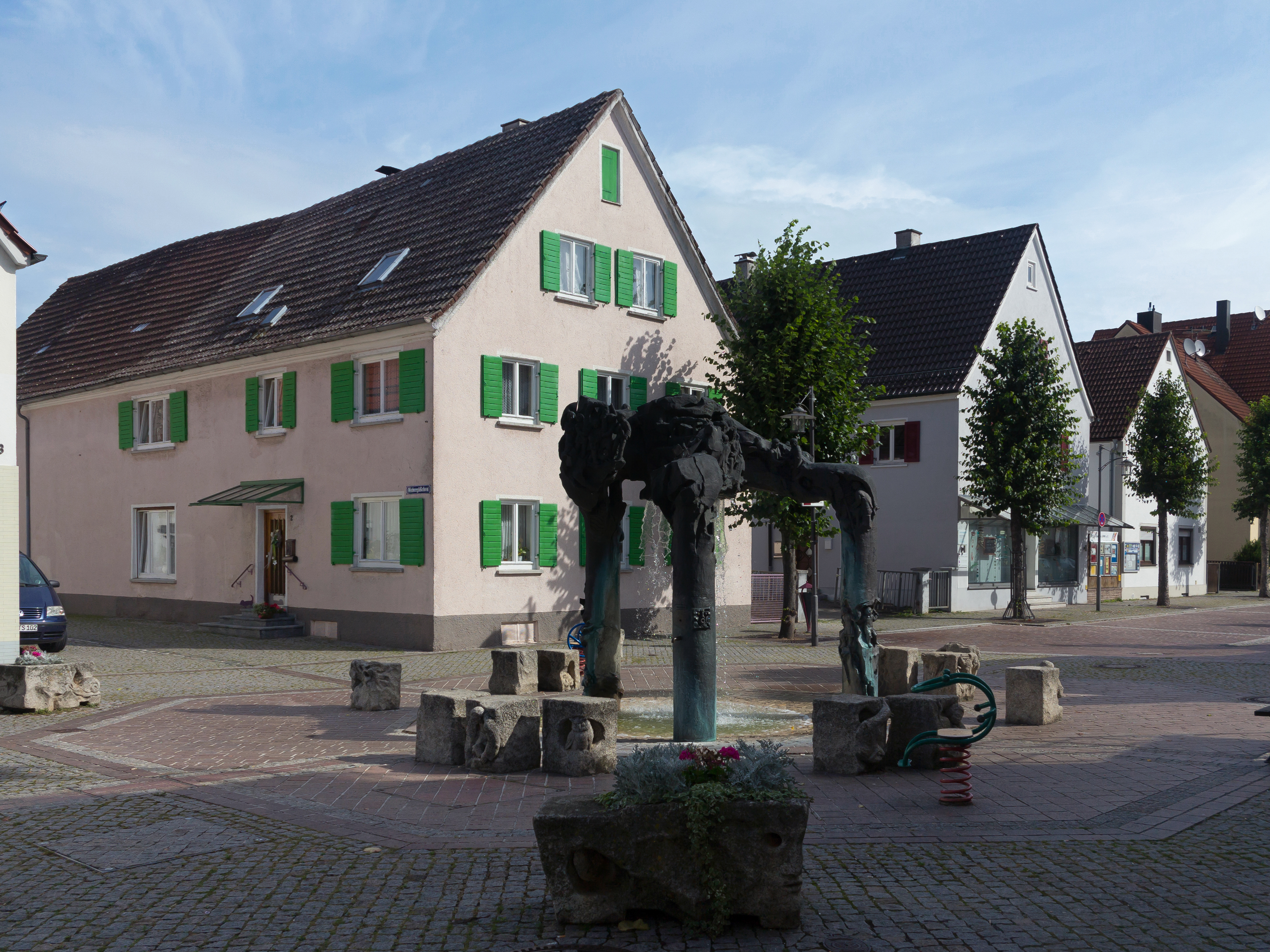
Sculpture at the Stadtberg

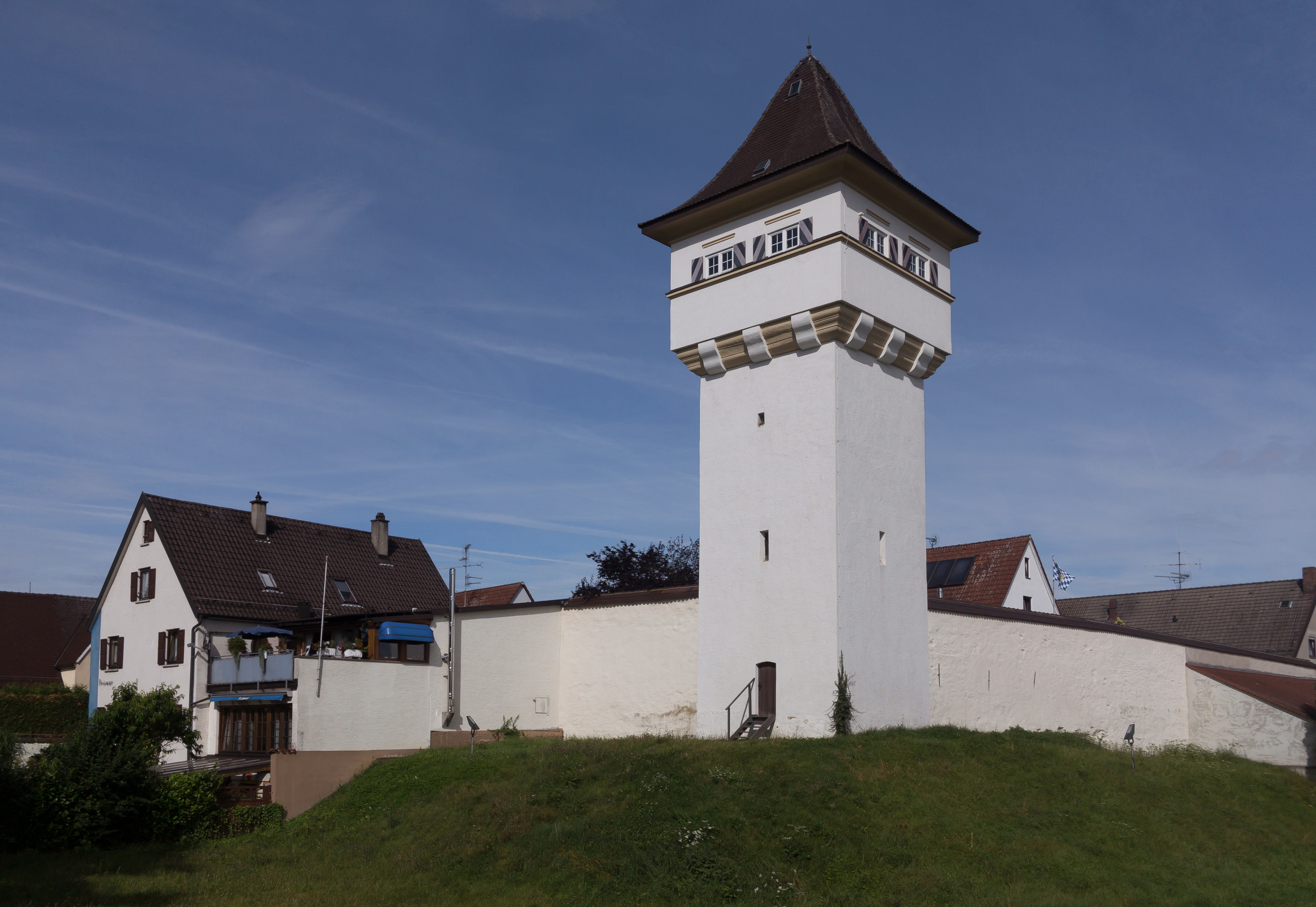
tower: der Hauselersturm

== Economy ==
Leipheim is home to three of the four Germany-based production areas of Wanzl, a large manufacturer of shopping carts operating worldwide. Since 1947, the family business has grown from a small workshop to a world leader in several areas.

== Volunteer Fire Brigade ==
The Voluntary Fire Brigade Leipheim has existed since 1865.

== Deutsche Lebensrettungsgesellschaft ==
The district association Leipheim/Günzburg of the German Life Saving Association with 450 members is based in Leipheim.

== Sons and daughters of the place ==
- Hans Karg (1551– † ca. 1610), Swabian painter
- Ernst Führich (born 1948), professor of law at the Kempten University of Applied Sciences
- Bernd Oberdorfer (born 1961), Professor of Systematic Theology and Ecumenism at the University of Augsburg
