= 94th Division =

In military terms, 94th Division or 94th Infantry Division may refer to:

- 94th Division (People's Republic of China)
- 94th Infantry Division (German Empire)
- 94th Infantry Division (Wehrmacht), Germany
- 94th Division (Imperial Japanese Army)
- 94th Guards Rifle Division, Soviet Union
- 94th Rifle Division, Soviet Union
- 94th Infantry Division (United States)

== See also ==
- 94th Infantry Division Memorial Highway (disambiguation)
- List of military divisions by number
- 94th Brigade (disambiguation)
- 94th Regiment (disambiguation)
- 94th Squadron (disambiguation)
