= Messerschmitt Me 323 Gigant =

German military transport aircraft of World War II

Me 323 Gigant
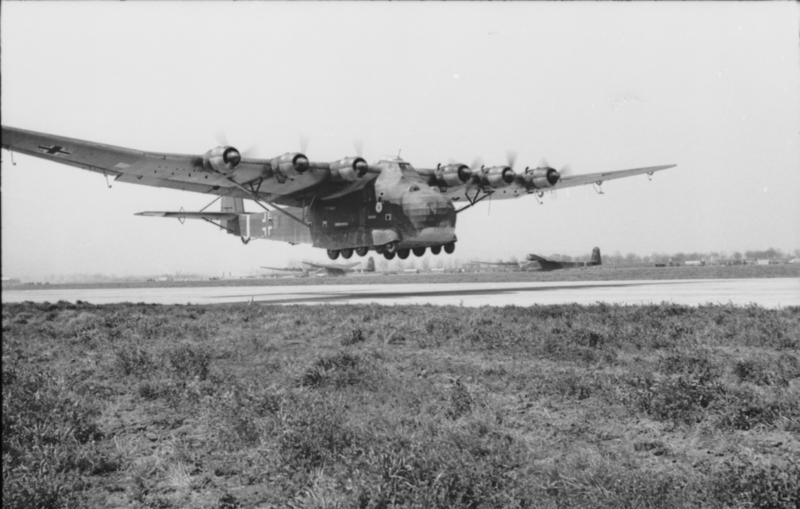

General information
- Type: Heavy transport
- Manufacturer: Messerschmitt
- Primary user: Luftwaffe
- Number built: 198

History
- Manufactured: 1942–1944
- Introduction date: 1943
- First flight: January 20, 1942
- Retired: 1944
- Developed from: Messerschmitt Me 321
- Developed into: Zeppelin-SNCASO ZSO 523

The Messerschmitt Me 323 Gigant ("Giant") was a German military transport aircraft of World War II. It was a powered variant of the Me 321 military glider and was the largest land-based transport aircraft to fly during the war. In total, 198 were made, with 15 being converted from the Me 321.

== Development ==
The Me 323 was the result of a 1940 German requirement for a large assault glider in preparation for Operation Sea Lion, the projected invasion of Great Britain. The DFS 230 light glider had already proven its worth in the Battle of Fort Eben-Emael in Belgium (the first ever assault by gliderborne troops), and would later be used in the invasion of Crete in 1941.

However, in order to mount an invasion across the English Channel, the Germans would need to be able to airlift vehicles and other heavy equipment as part of an initial assault wave. Although Operation Sea Lion was cancelled, the requirement for a heavy air transport capability remained, with the focus shifting to the forthcoming Operation Barbarossa, the invasion of the Soviet Union.

On 18 October 1940, Junkers and Messerschmitt were given just 14 days to submit a proposal for a large transport glider. The emphasis was still very much on the assault role; the ambitious requirement was to be able to carry either an 88 mm gun and its half-track tractor, or a Panzer IV medium tank. The Junkers Ju 322 Mammut reached prototype form, but was eventually scrapped due to difficulties in procuring the necessary high-grade timber for its all-wood construction, and it was discovered during the Mammut's first test flight that an unacceptably high degree of instability was inherent in the design. The proposed Messerschmitt aircraft was originally designated Me 261w—partly borrowing the designation of the long-range Messerschmitt Me 261—then changed to Me 263 (later reused for Messerschmitt's improved rocket fighter design), and eventually became the Me 321. Although the Me 321 saw considerable service on the Eastern Front as a transport, it was never used for its intended role as an assault glider.

=== Me 323 ===
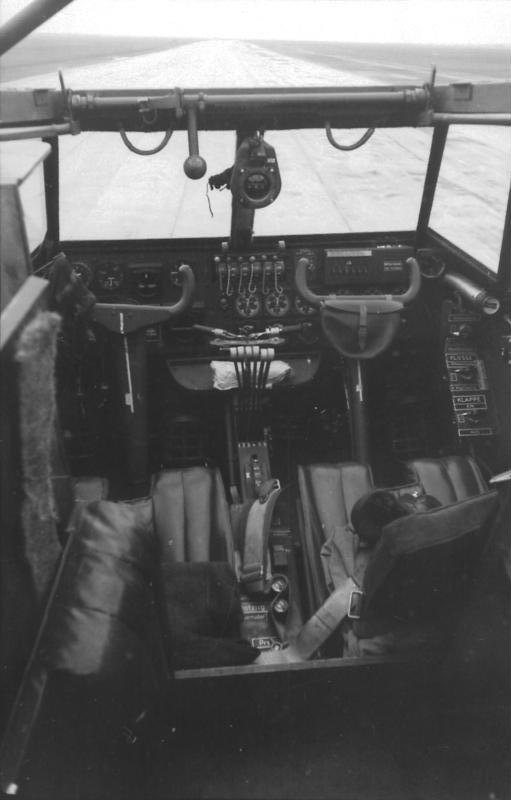
View into the cockpit of the Me 323

Early in 1941, as a result of feedback from Transport Command pilots in Russia, the decision was taken to produce a motorized variant of the Me 321, to be designated Me 323. French Gnome et Rhône GR14N radial engines, rated at 1,180 PS (1,164 hp, 868 kW) for take-off as used in the Bloch MB.175 aircraft were chosen for use. This would reduce the burden on Germany's strained industry.

Initial tests were conducted with four Gnome engines attached to a strengthened Me 321 wing, giving modest speed of 210 km/h (130 mph) – 80 km/h (50 mph) slower than the Ju 52 transport aircraft. A fixed undercarriage was fitted, with four small wheels in a bogie at the front of the aircraft and six larger wheels in two lines of three at each side of the fuselage, partly covered by an aerodynamic fairing. The rear wheels were fitted with pneumatic brakes that could stop the aircraft within 200 m (660 ft).

The four-engined Me 323C was considered a stepping-stone to the six-engined D series. It still required the five-engined Heinkel He 111Z Zwilling or the highly dangerous "vic-style" Troika-Schlepp formation of three Messerschmitt Bf 110 heavy fighters and underwing-mounted Walter HWK 109-500 Starthilfe rocket-assisted take-off units to get airborne when fully loaded, but it could return to base under its own power when empty. This was little better than the Me 321, so the V2 prototype became the first to have six engines and flew for the first time in early 1942, becoming the prototype for the D-series aircraft.

To reduce torque, the aircraft was fitted with three counterclockwise rotation engines on the port wing and three clockwise rotation engines on the starboard wing, as seen looking forward from behind each engine.

== Design ==
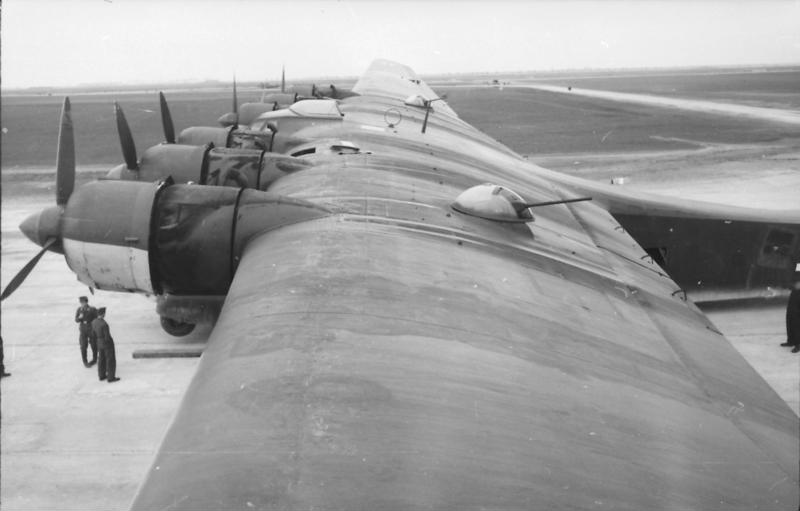
Gigant wing, showing wing gun positions

Like the Me 321, the Me 323 had massive, semicantilever, high-mounted wings, which were braced from the fuselage out to the middle of the wing. To reduce weight and save aluminium, much of the wing was made of plywood and fabric, while the fuselage was of metal-tube construction with wooden spars and covered with doped fabric, with heavy bracing in the floor to support the payload.

The "D" series had a crew of five - two pilots, two flight engineers, and a radio operator. Two gunners could also be carried. The flight engineers occupied two small cabins, one in each wing between the inboard and centre engines. The engineers were intended to monitor engine synchronisation and allow the pilot to fly without worrying about engine status, although the pilot could override the engineers' decisions on engine and propeller control.

Maximum payload was around 12 tonnes, although at that weight, the Walter HWK 109-500 Starthilfe rocket-assisted takeoff units used on the Me 321 were required for takeoff. These were mounted beneath the wings outboard of the engines, with the wings having underside fittings to take up to four units. The cargo hold was 11 m (36 ft) long, 3 m (10 ft) wide and 3.4 m (11 ft) high. Typical loads were one 15 cm sFH 18 heavy field howitzer (5.5 ton) accompanied by its Sd.Kfz. 7 half-track artillery tractor vehicle (11 ton), two 3.6 tonne (4 ton) trucks, 8,700 loaves of bread, an 88 mm Flak gun and accessories, 52 drums of fuel (252 L/45 US gal), 130 men, or 60 stretchers.

Some Me 321s were converted to Me 323s, but most were built as six-engined aircraft from the beginning. Early models were fitted with wooden, two-blade propellers, while later versions had metal, three-blade, variable-pitch versions.

The Me 323 had a maximum speed of only 219 km/h (136 mph) at sea level. It was armed with six 13 mm (.51 in) MG 131 machine guns firing from a dorsal position behind the wings and from the fuselage. They were manned by the extra gunners, radio operator, and engineers.

== Operational history ==
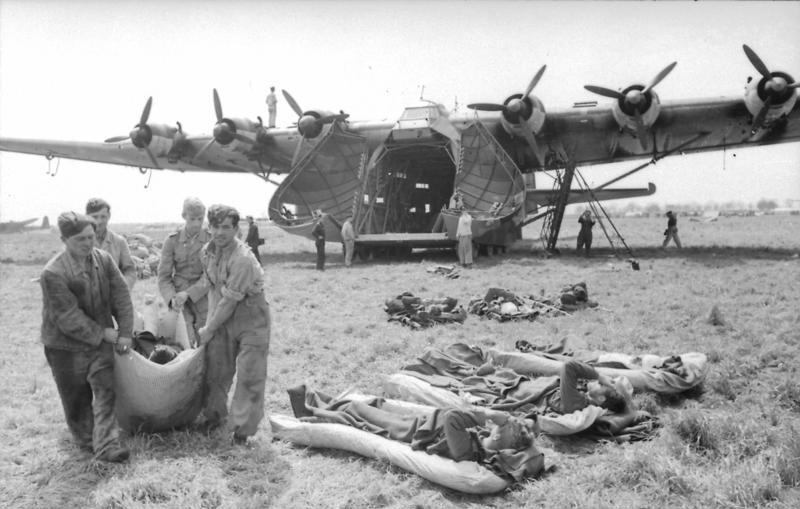
An Me 323 transporting wounded personnel in Italy, March 1943

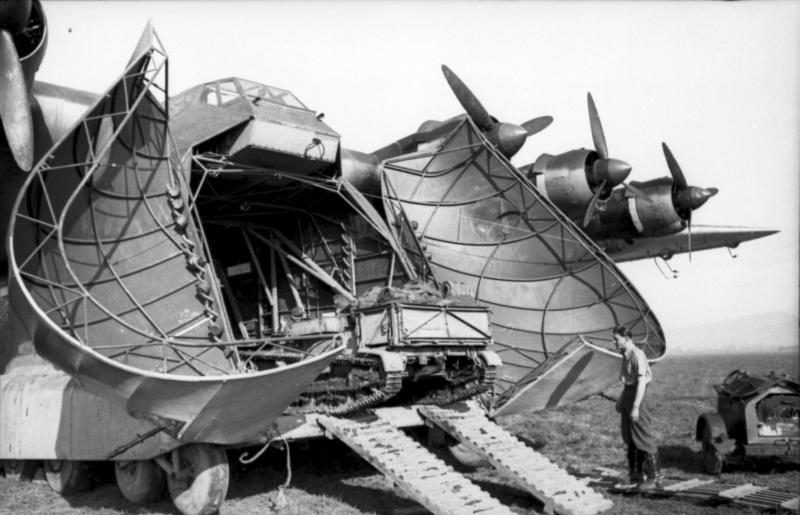
A Me 323 unloads a Renault UE in Tunisia, January 1943

By September 1942, Me 323s were being delivered for use in the Tunisian campaign. They entered service in the Mediterranean theatre in November 1942. High losses among Axis shipping required a huge airlift of equipment across the Mediterranean to keep Rommel's Afrika Korps supplied.

On 22 April 1943, a formation of 27 fully loaded Me 323s was being escorted across the Sicilian Straits by Messerschmitt Bf 109s of Jagdgeschwader 27 when it was intercepted by seven squadrons — Supermarine Spitfires (No. 1 Squadron SAAF) and Curtiss P-40 Kittyhawks (No. 7 South African Wing). Of the 27 transports, 16 or 17 were shot down. Three or four P-40s were shot down by the escorts.

A total of 198 Me 323s were built before production ceased in April 1944. Several production versions were built, beginning with the D-1. Later D- and E- versions differed in the choice of power plant and in defensive armament, with improvements in structural strength, total cargo load, and fuel capacity also being implemented. Nonetheless, the Me 323 remained underpowered. A proposal to install six BMW 801 radials did not occur. The Me 323 was also a short-range aircraft, with a typical range (loaded) of 1,000–1,200 km (620–750 mi). Despite this, the limited numbers of Me 323s in service were an asset to the Germans, and saw extensive use.

== Variants ==
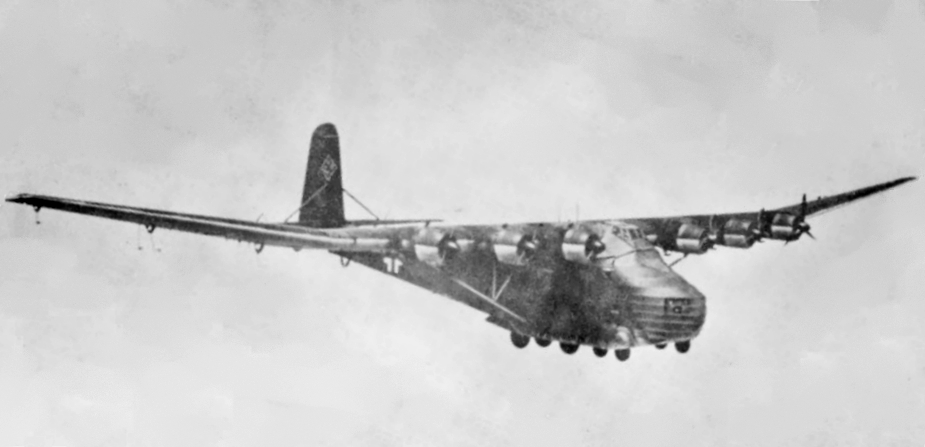
Messerschmitt Me 323D

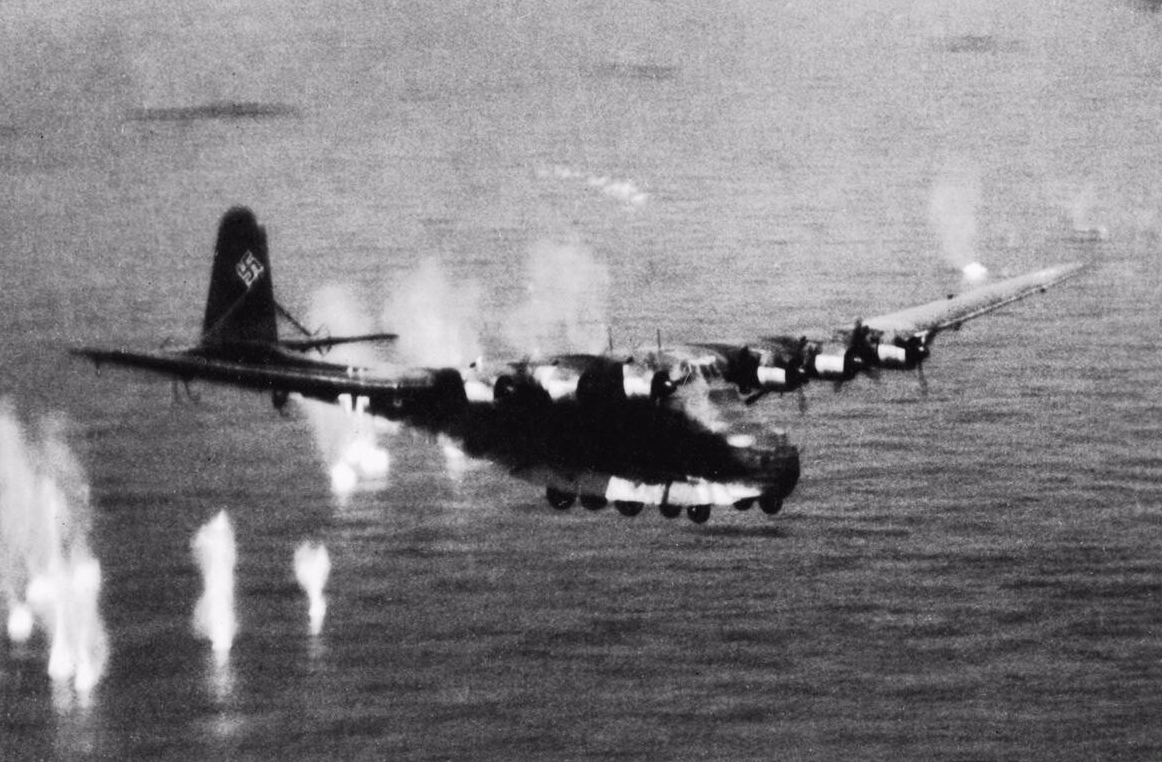
Photograph of Luftwaffe Me 323 being shot down by a Martin B-26 Marauder of 14 Squadron RAF, Northwest African Coastal Air Force near Cap Corse, Corsica

Me 323 V1
First prototype, powered by four Gnome-Rhône 14N-48/49 engines
Me 323C
Interim production version based on the V1 prototype with four engines
Me 323 V2
Prototype, powered by six Gnome-Rhône 14N engines, became the standard for D production series
Me 323D-1
First production series, powered by six Gnome-Rhône 14N engines originally intended for use in the Bloch 175, two 7.92 mm (.312 in) MG 15 machine guns in cockpit fittings provided, field modifications increased defensive armament, variable-pitch Ratier propellers with three blades
Me 323D-2
Same as D-1 but with engine installation originally intended for use in the LeO 451, fixed-pitch wooden Heine propellers with two blades
Me 323D-6
Same as D-2, but with variable-pitch Ratier propellers with three blades
Me 323 V13
Prototype, powered by six Gnome-Rhône 14N engines, served as a master for the Me 323E production series
Me 323 V14
Prototype, powered by six 1,340 PS Kraftei (unitized) Junkers Jumo 211F engines, not proceeded with
Me 323E-1
Second production series, two gun turrets incorporated in the wings
Me 323E-2
Proposed version with heavier armament
Me 323E-2 WT
Proposed 'escort' gunship version, based on the E-1. Classified as a Waffenträger ("weapons carrier") by the RLM, which the WT suffix denoted, in a similar role to that of the American Boeing YB-40 Flying Fortress "gunship" conversion for the USAAF. Primary mission was to provide normal 323 cargo formations with heavy defensive protection. No cargo carrying ability. "Solid" nose with 20mm cannon turret, two additional wing turrets plus up to ten other machine guns and cannon of varying calibres firing from standard and new waist/beam positions. 1.3 tonnes of armour plating was added across the entire airframe. To operate the weapons the crew increased to twenty-one. Two prototypes built and tested, but series was cancelled after it was judged that normal single-engined fighters were more effective in the transport escort role. One of the prototypes was briefly assigned to KG 200 for operational evaluation, where it flew armed escort for the small number of captured B-17 Flying Fortresses operated by the Geschwader.
Me 323 V16
Prototype, powered by six unitized 1,340 PS Jumo 211R engines, intended to serve as a master for the Me 323F production series
Me 323F
Projected production version of the V16 prototype, instead produced by Luftschiffbau Zeppelin as the ZMe 323F
Me 323 V17
Prototype (unfinished), powered by six 1,600 PS (1,578 hp, 1,177 kW) Gnome-Rhône 14R engines, intended to serve as a master for the Me 323G
Me 323G
Projected production version of the V17 prototype
ZMe 323H
Projected version with a load capacity of 18 tons and a range of about 600 miles
Me 323Z
Proposed Zwilling ("Twin") variant with two fuselages joined by a central wing. The aircraft would have been powered by 9 BMW 801 engines and would have been the largest aircraft at the time by wingspan had it been built. According to some sources a single example was constructed, however there is no evidence to verify this claim.
ZMe 423
Proposed six-engined heavy transport aircraft based on the Me 323

== Surviving aircraft ==
While no complete aircraft survives, the Luftwaffenmuseum der Bundeswehr (Air Force Museum of the German Federal Armed Forces) in Berlin has a Me 323 main wing spar in its collection. A ruined but complete wreck was found in 2012, in the sea near La Maddalena, an island near Sardinia, Italy. The aircraft lies in around 60 m (200 ft) of water, around 8 nautical miles (15 km; 9.2 mi) from the coast. It was shot down by a British Beaufighter long-range fighter on 26 July 1943, while flying from Sardinia to Pistoia in Italy. There is also a part of the wing in the village of Łosiniec in Poland used as a bridge to get to a church. Though there is a new bridge build, the wing is still left there for people to look at. The aircraft the wing is from was supposedly shot down by partisans and later destroyed by the Germans.

== Specifications (Me 323D-6) ==
Data from Britannica Book Of The Year 1944; German Aircraft of the Second World War

General characteristics

- Crew: 5
- Capacity: 130 troops or 10,000–12,000 kg (22,000–26,500 lb) payload
- Length: 28.2 m (92 ft 6 in)
- Wingspan: 55.2 m (181 ft 1 in)
- Height: 10.15 m (33 ft 4 in)
- Wing area: 300 m^{2} (3,200 sq ft)
- Airfoil: root: NACA 2R1 19; tip: NACA 2R1 10
- Empty weight: 27,330 kg (60,252 lb)
- Gross weight: 29,500 kg (65,036 lb)
- Max takeoff weight: 43,000 kg (94,799 lb)
- Powerplant: 6 × Gnome-Rhône 14N 14-cylinder air-cooled radial piston engines 1,180 PS (1,164 hp; 867.9 kW) take-off power
- Propellers: 6 x 3-bladed Chauvière variable-pitch propeller

Performance

- Maximum speed: 285 km/h (177 mph, 154 kn)
- Cruise speed: 218 km/h (135 mph, 118 kn)
- Range: 800 km (500 mi, 430 nmi)
- Ferry range: 1,100 km (680 mi, 590 nmi)
- Service ceiling: 4,000 m (13,000 ft)
- Rate of climb: 3.6 m/s (710 ft/min)

Armament

- Guns: 7.92 mm MG 15, MG 81 or 13 mm MG 131 machine-guns

== See also ==
Related development

- Messerschmitt Me 321

Aircraft of comparable role, configuration, and era

- Junkers Ju 322 Mammut
- Arado Ar 232

Related lists

- List of aircraft of World War II
- List of military aircraft of Germany

== Bibliography ==
- Dabrowski, Hans-Peter. Messerschmitt Me 321/323: The Luftwaffe's "Giants" in World War II. Atglen, PA: Schiffer Publishing, 2001. ISBN 0-7643-1442-4.
- Green, William (1979) [1970]. Warplanes of the Third Reich (2nd ed.). London: Macdonald and Jane's. ISBN 0-356-02382-6.
- Hyland, Gary; Gill, Anton (1999). Last Talons of the Eagle: Secret Nazi Technology Which Could Have Changed the Course of World War II. Toronto, Ont: McArthur & Company. ISBN 0-7472-5964-X.
- Lefèbvre, J.-M. (December 1972). "Messerschmitt 321–323, les plus grosses cibles jamais offertes aux Allies par la Luftwaffe (2)" [Messerschmitt 321–323: The Biggest Target Ever Offered to the Allies by the Luftwaffe, Part 2]. Le Album de Fanatique de l'Aviation (in French) (39): 21–25. ISSN 0757-4169.
- Mondey, David. The Concise Guide to Axis Aircraft of World War II. New York: Bounty Books, 1996. ISBN 1-85152-966-7.
- Roba, Jean-Louis (March 1996). "Le Me 323 en Méditerranée" [The Messerschmitt Me 323 in the Mediterranean]. Avions: Toute l'aéronautique et son histoire (in French) (36): 11–16. ISSN 1243-8650.
- Smith, J. R. and Anthony L. Kay. German Aircraft of the Second World War. London: Putnam and Company, 1978, First edition 1972. ISBN 0-370-00024-2.
- Staerck, Christopher, Paul Sinnott and Anton Gill. Luftwaffe: The Allied Intelligence Files. London: Brassey's, 2002. ISBN 1-57488-387-9.
- Weal, John. Jagdgeschwader 27 'Afrika'. Oxford, UK: Osprey, 2003. ISBN 1-84176-538-4.
- Yust, Walter. Britannica Book of the Year 1944. London: The Encyclopædia Britannica Company Ltd., 1944, pp. 32–33 (pp. 57–58 at the Internet Archive).
