= Messerschmitt Me 321 Gigant =

German cargo glider

Me 321 Gigant
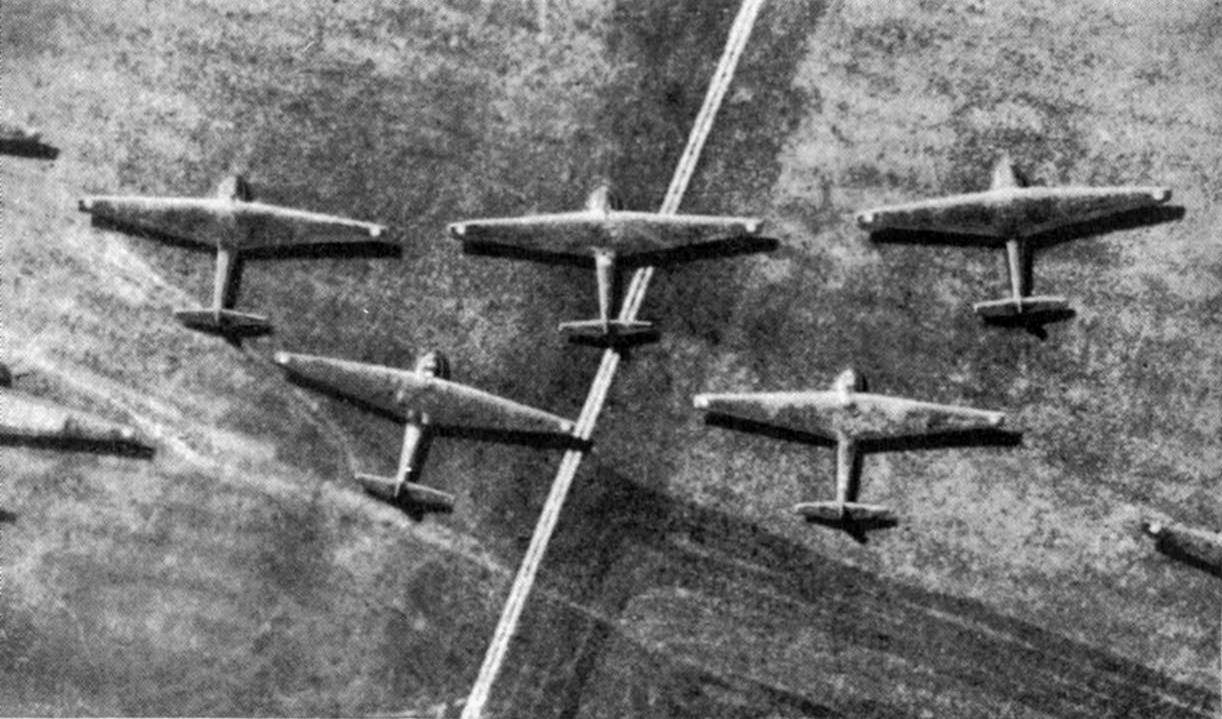
- Messerschmitt Me 321 gliders on airfield 1942

General information
- Type: Cargo glider
- Manufacturer: Messerschmitt
- Status: Retired
- Primary user: Luftwaffe
- Number built: 200

History
- Manufactured: June 1941 – April 1942
- Introduction date: 1941
- First flight: 25 February 1941
- Developed into: Messerschmitt Me 323

The Messerschmitt Me 321 Gigant was a large German cargo glider developed and used during World War II. Intended to support large-scale invasions, the Me 321 had very limited use due to the low availability of suitable tug aircraft, high vulnerability whilst in flight, and its difficult ground handling, both at base and at destination landing sites. The Me 321 was developed, in stages, into the six-engined Messerschmitt Me 323 Gigant, which removed some of the problems with ground handling, although the payload was reduced. Vulnerability to ground fire and aerial attack remained a constant problem during operations of all variants.

== Development ==
During the preparations for a possible invasion of Britain during World War II (Operation Sea Lion) the Luftwaffe's Transport Command saw an obvious need for a larger-capacity cargo- and troop-carrying aircraft than its mainstay, the Junkers Ju 52.

Germany shelved plans for Operation Sea Lion in December 1940, and while planning for the invasion of the USSR (Operation Barbarossa) they determined that gliders were a cost-effective solution for the problem of air transport. Accordingly, the Technical Bureau of the Luftwaffe issued a tender for rapid development of a Grossraumlastensegler ("large-capacity transport glider") to the aircraft manufacturers Junkers and Messerschmitt. The specification called for the glider to be capable of carrying either an 88 mm gun plus its tractor, or a medium tank. The codename Projekt Warschau (Project Warsaw) was used, with Junkers being given the codename Warschau-Ost and Messerschmitt Warschau-Süd.

The Junkers design, the Ju 322 Mammut was unsuccessful, though, due to the company opting to use all-wood construction. Messerschmitt's design for this transport glider consequently secured the contract for the company. Initially given the Reichsluftfahrtministerium (RLM/Reich Aviation Ministry) designation Me 263, this designation number was later reused (see: RLM) for the second-generation rocket fighter developed in 1945: Messerschmitt Me 263. That number was "freed-up" when the number for this aircraft was switched to Me 321.

== Design ==
The Me 263 had a framework of steel tubing provided by the Mannesmann company, with wooden spars and a covering of doped fabric. This allowed for quick construction and easy repair when needed and also saved weight. The Me 263 was redesignated the Me 321 and was nicknamed Gigant (Giant) due to its huge size.

Its nose stood over 6 m (20 ft) high, and was made up of two clamshell doors, which could only be opened from the inside, when ramps would be used to allow vehicles to drive in or out. Compared to the Ju 52, the Me 321 offered a load area six times larger. The cargo hold was 11 m (36 ft) long, 3 m (10 ft) wide and 3.4 m (11 ft) high, and could accommodate a gross cargo weighing up to 23 t (23 long tons). The cargo space had been designed to replicate the load space of a standard German railway flatcar, allowing any cargo that could travel by rail to fit into an Me 321. In addition, if used as a passenger transport, it could accommodate up to 200 fully equipped soldiers.

The Me 321 was fitted with a jettisonable undercarriage comprising two Bf 109 mainwheels at the front and two Junkers Ju 90 main wheels at the rear and was intended to land on four extendable skids.

The first flight of the prototype Me 321 V1 took place on 25 February 1941, towed into the air by a Junkers Ju 90. It was piloted by Messerschmitt test pilot Karl Baur, and carried 3 tonnes (3 tons) of ballast. Baur reported that the controls were heavy and responses sluggish. They decided to enlarge the cockpit to accommodate a co-pilot and radio operator, and dual controls were fitted. Electric servo motors were also fitted to assist in moving the huge trailing edge flaps and further tests caused a braking parachute to also be added.

The test flights were plagued by take-off difficulties, since the Junkers Ju 90 was not powerful enough, and as an interim measure three Bf 110 heavy fighters were used, in a so-called Troikaschlepp, with the trio of twin-engined fighters taking off together in a V formation. This was a highly dangerous manoeuvre and Ernst Udet asked Ernst Heinkel to come up with a better aerial towing method. Heinkel responded by creating the Heinkel He 111Z Zwilling (Twins), which combined two He 111 aircraft through the use of a new "center" wing section with a fifth engine added. Underwing-mount, liquid monopropellant Walter HWK 109-500 Starthilfe rocket-assisted take-off booster units were also used to assist take-off from rough fields.

== Operational history ==
The first Me 321 A-1 production aircraft entered service in May 1941 with Grossraumlastensegler 321 at Leipheim, initially towed by Ju 90s and later by the He 111Z and the Troikaschlepp arrangement of three Bf 110s. The triple Troikaschlepp arrangement was very dangerous in the event that one or more of the take-off booster rockets failed. One such failure did occur in 1941, which led to the collision of the tow planes and the deaths of all 129 occupants of the four aircraft. This was the deadliest aviation accident up to that time and was not matched until the Tachikawa air disaster of 1953 and not exceeded until the 1960 New York mid-air collision. The later Me 321 B-1 variant had a crew of three and was armed with four 7.92 mm (.312 in) MG 15 machine guns.

The Me 321 was less than successful on the Eastern Front for various reasons:

- As a glider, the Me 321 lacked the ability to make a second or third approach to a crowded landing strip.
- Moving on the ground was impossible without specialized vehicles.
- Before the introduction of the He 111 Zwilling, the dangerous Troikaschlepp arrangement gave a one-way range of only 400 km (250 mi), which was insufficient for a safe operating zone.

In early 1942, the remaining Me 321s were withdrawn from service in Russia in anticipation of the planned Operation Herkules, the invasion of Malta, in which a fleet of the gliders hauled by He 111Zs was to be used. The plan was abandoned due to a lack of towing aircraft.

In 1943, Me 321s returned to Russia for use in a projected operation to relieve the besieged Sixth Army at Stalingrad, but by the time they reached the front line, no suitable airfields remained and they were sent back to Germany.

Following the cancellation of the Stalingrad operation, the Me 321 gliders were mothballed, scrapped, or converted into the powered variant, the Me 323 with six 895 kW (1,200 hp) engines, the largest land-based cargo aircraft of World War II. A further proposed operation — in which the remaining Me 321s would have landed troops on Sicily — was also abandoned, due to a lack of suitable landing sites.

Ultimately, 200 Me 321s were produced.

== Variants ==
- Me 321A-1: single-pilot version; 100 built
- Me 321B-1: had a crew of three (including co-pilot) and was armed with 2–4 × 7.92 mm (0.312 in) MG 15 machine-guns; 100 built

== Specifications (Me 321B) ==
Data from Die Deutsche Luftruestung 1933–1945 Vol.3 – Flugzeugtypen Henschel-Messerschmitt, Fighting gliders of World War II

General characteristics

- Crew: 3
- Capacity: 200 equipped troops or 20,000 kg (44,000 lb) of cargo / military equipment
- Length: 28.15 m (92 ft 4 in)
- Wingspan: 55 m (180 ft 5 in)
- Height: 10.15 m (33 ft 4 in)
- Wing area: 300 m^{2} (3,200 sq ft)
- Empty weight: 12,200 kg (26,896 lb)
- Gross weight: 34,400 kg (75,839 lb)

Performance

- Rate of climb: 2.5 m/s (490 ft/min) when towed by three Messerschmitt Bf 110 aircraft in a Troika-schlepp (triple-tow)
- Maximum tow speed: 180 km/h (110 mph; 97 kn)

Armament

- 2-4× 7.92 mm (0.312 in) MG 15 machine-guns

== See also ==
Related development

- Messerschmitt Me 323

Aircraft of comparable role, configuration, and era

- Junkers Ju 322

Related lists

- List of aircraft of World War II
