= 094 (disambiguation) =

Type 094 submarine is a class of nuclear-powered ballistic missile submarines developed by China.

094 may also refer to:

- Uncanny X-men 094, a comic book starring the X-Men
- Junkers EF 094, a Luftwaffe military glider
- WD 1554+094, a binary system composed of a white dwarf and a brown dwarf
- Uncial 094, a Greek uncial manuscript of the New Testament

== See also ==
- 94 (disambiguation)
