= Battle of Dominica =

Battle of Dominica may refer to:

- Invasion of Dominica (1761) in the Seven Years' War
- Invasion of Dominica (1778) in the American War of Independence
- Battle of the Saintes or Bataille de Dominique, a battle of 1782
- Operation Red Dog a filibustering plot by Canadian and American white supremacists
