= Zeppelin-SNCASO ZSO 523 =

Proposed 1940s large military transport

ZSO 523

General information
- Type: Large cargo transport
- National origin: Germany
- Manufacturer: SNCASO
- Status: Abandoned

History
- Developed from: Messerschmitt Me 323

The ZSO 523 was a proposed 1940s large military transport designed by the Zeppelin company of Friedrichshafen. During the Second World War Nazi Germany concentrated on building fighters and bombers and the production of support aircraft was transferred to occupied France. The project was abandoned when France was liberated in 1944.

== Design and development ==
With Messerschmitt concentrating on the design and construction of combat aircraft, The Luftschiffbau Zeppelin company was commissioned with designing an enlarged variant of the Messerschmitt Me 323 "Gigant" in early 1943. Initially, Luftschiffbau Zeppelin only attempted to improve on the Me 323‘s design, resulting in the ZMe 323 G and ZMe 323 H variants, which failed to meet the Luftwaffe’s expectations and were never constructed. Following this setback, Luftschiffbau Zeppelin chose to significantly redesign the aircraft into what would become known as the ZSO 523. Due to a lack of available specialists at Luftschiffbau Zeppelin, the project was subcontracted to French aircraft manufacturer SNCASO.

The ZSO 523 was planned to be a high-wing monoplane like the Me 323 but of larger proportions. Unlike the Me 323, it was to have both a front and rear loading ramp, and a twin tail. The aircraft was noteworthy for having one of the most spacious cockpits of any World War 2 era German aircraft, located above of the fuselage. The crew consisted of 5 people; a captain, a co-pilot, a radio operator and navigator, only one flight mechanic, unlike its predecessor, and (optionally) a loading attendant. The ZSO 523 was to be powered by six Gnome-Rhône 18R engines providing 2200 hp (later 2500 hp) of thrust each. The landing gear was to consist of 8 hydraulically retractable wheels, and was also designed to lower the aircraft's fuselage to ground level for loading and reloading.

== Mockup ==
A full scale mockup of the ZSO 523's fuselage was constructed in late 1944. Its whereabouts and fate are unknown

== Specifications (ZSO 523-0) ==
Source: General characteristics

- Crew: 5
- Length: 40.25 m (132 ft 0 in)
- Wingspan: 70 m (230 ft 0 in)
- Height: 11.25 m (36 ft 11 in)
- Wing area: 456 m^{2} (4,910 sq ft)
- Empty weight: 48,200 kg (106,262 lb)
- Gross weight: 85,000 kg (187,393 lb)
- Max takeoff weight: 95,000 kg (209,439 lb)
- Powerplant: 6 × Gnome-Rhône 18R , 1,618 kW (2,200 hp) each

Performance

- Maximum speed: 382 km/h (237 mph, 206 kn)
- Cruise speed: 300 km/h (186 mph, 162 kn)
- Range: 2,300 km (1,430 mi, 1,240 nmi)
- Service ceiling: 6,200 m (20,341 ft)
- Rate of climb: 3 m/s (590 ft/min)

== See also ==
Related lists

- List of military aircraft of Germany
