= 94th Regiment of Foot (disambiguation) =

Four regiments of the British Army have been numbered the 94th Regiment of Foot:

- 94th Regiment of Foot (1760), raised in 1760
- 94th Regiment of Foot (1780), raised in 1780
- 94th Regiment of Foot (Irish), raised in 1794
- 94th Regiment of Foot (1794), raised as the Scotch Brigade in 1794 and numbered 94 in 1802
- 94th Regiment of Foot (1823), raised in 1823
