= 94 =

94 may refer to:

- 94 (number), the natural number following 93 and preceding 95
- one of the years 94 BC, AD 94, 1994, 2094, etc.
- Atomic number 94: plutonium
- Saab 94, a roadster
- 94 Aurora, a main-belt asteroid

== See also ==
- 094 (disambiguation)
- 94th (disambiguation)
- List of highways numbered 94
