= 94th Regiment =

94th Regiment may refer to:

== Non-infantry regiments ==
- 94th Field Artillery Regiment
- 94th Cavalry Regiment
- 94th Fighter Aviation Regiment
- 94th Heavy Anti-Aircraft Regiment, Royal Artillery
- 94th Light Anti-Aircraft Regiment, Royal Artillery

== Infantry regiments ==
- 94th Regiment of Foot (disambiguation), several units of the British Army
- 94th Russell's Infantry, a unit of the British Indian Army
- 94th Infantry Regiment (France)
- 94th Infantry Regiment (German Empire), part of the IV Reserve Corps
- 94th Provisional Infantry Regiment (PA)

=== Union Army (American Civil War) ===
- 94th Illinois Infantry Regiment
- 94th Indiana Infantry Regiment
- 94th New York Infantry Regiment
- 94th Ohio Infantry Regiment

== See also ==
- 94th Brigade (disambiguation)
- 94th Division (disambiguation)
