= Invasion of Dominica (1761) =

1761 battle

- Part of the Seven Years' War
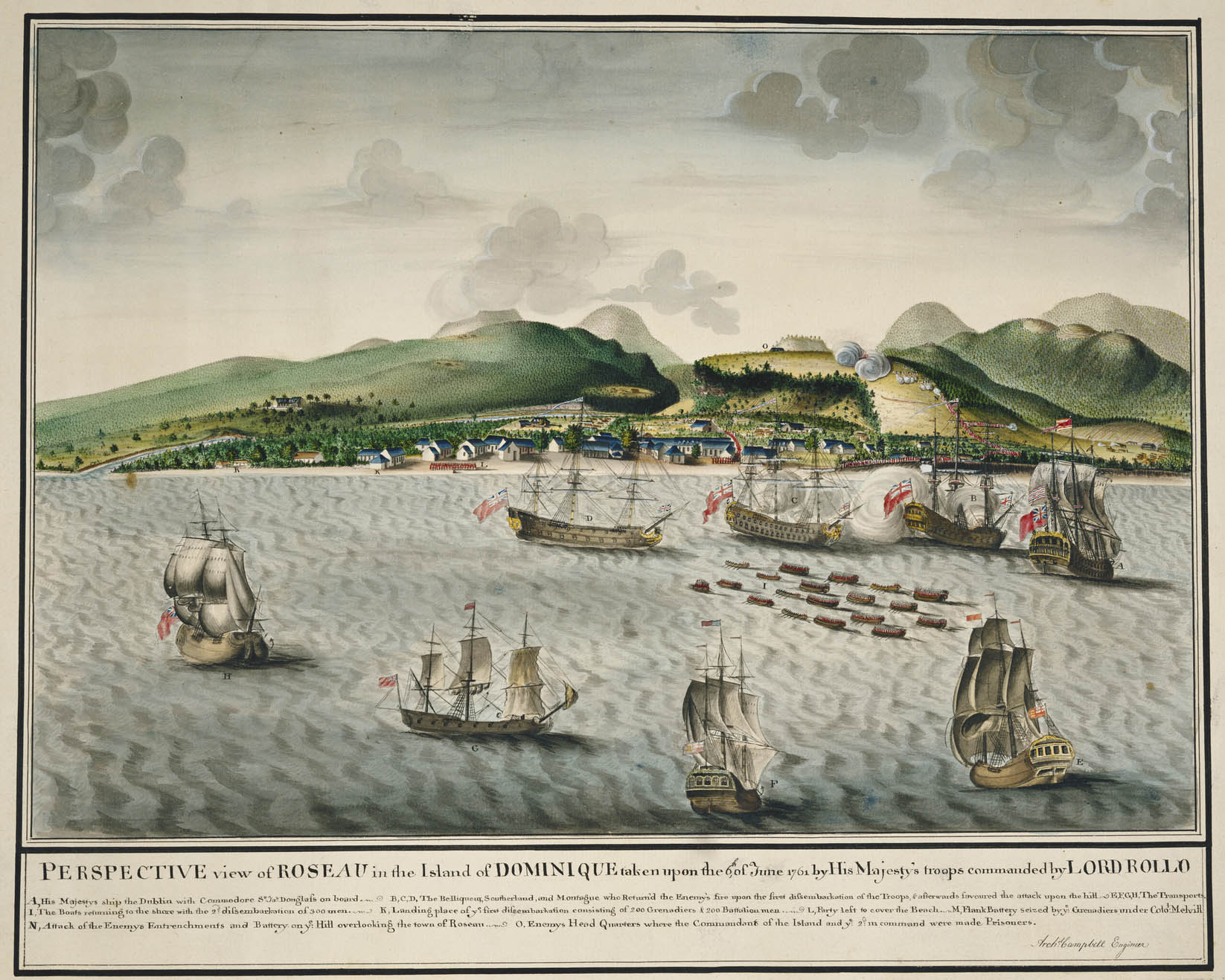
- A view of the British attack on Roseau, 6 June 1761, as drawn by Archibald Campbell (Royal Engineers).
Date	June 1761
Location	Roseau, Dominica 15.3°N 61.3831°W
Result	British victory

Belligerents
Great Britain	France

Commanders and leaders
Lord Rollo; Sir James Douglas	Louis Robert de la Touche de Longpré (POW)

Strength
4 ships of the line 2 frigates	Unknown

Casualties and losses
8 killed or wounded	Unknown

The Invasion of Dominica was a British military expedition to capture the Caribbean island of Dominica in June 1761, as part of the Seven Years' War.

== Prelude ==
By the end of 1760, the conquest of Canada was completed and a great number of British troops were left idle in North America.

As early as January 1761, William Pitt had informed Amherst that some of his troops would be required in the autumn for the conquest of Dominica, Saint Lucia and Martinique. Amherst had to immediately send 2,000 men to Guadeloupe, which was already in British hands since the British expedition against Guadeloupe in 1759, where he would concert with the governor of the island the means of taking Dominica and Saint Lucia. Furthermore, Amherst had to despatch another 6,000 men later in the year for the capture of Martinique.

== Expedition ==
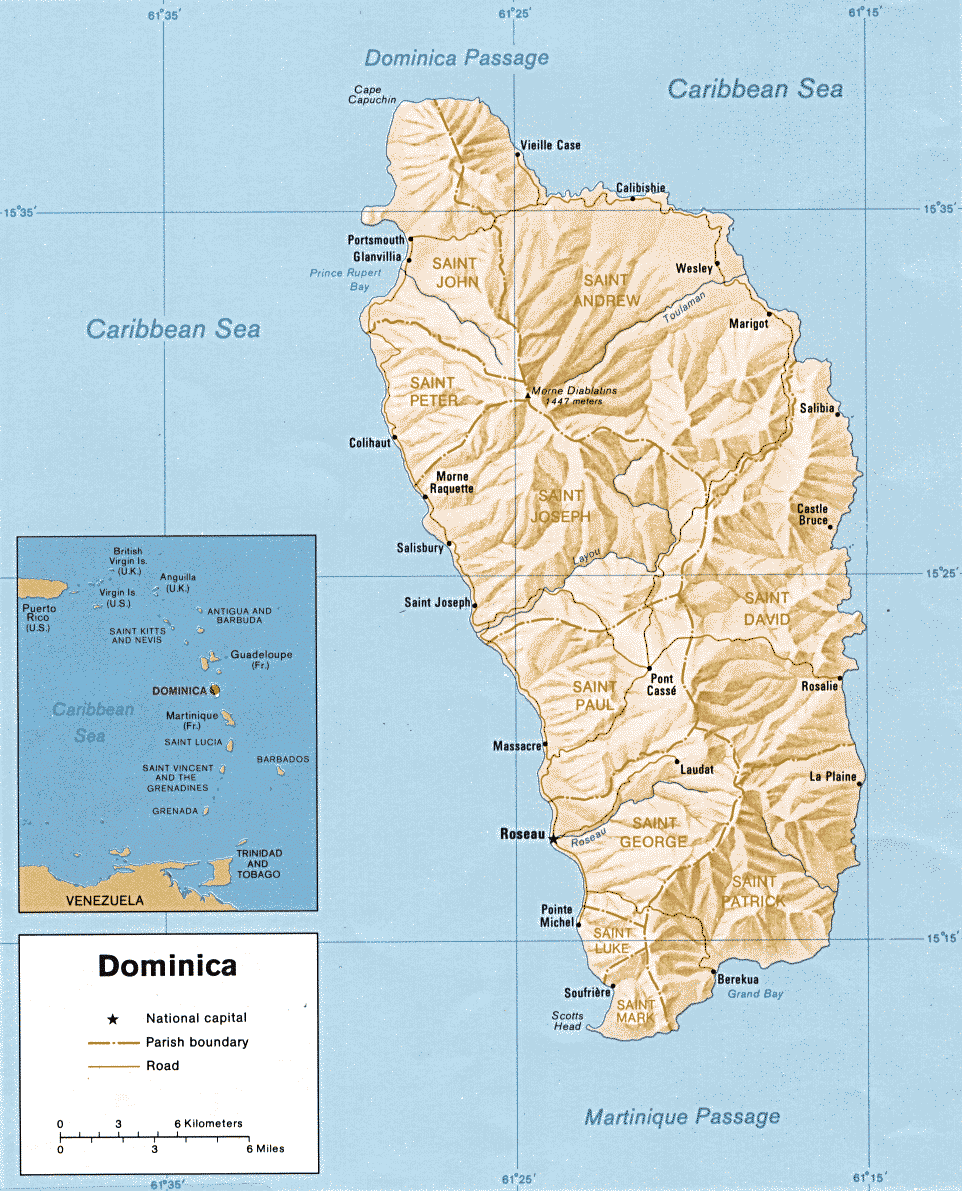
Location of Dominica

In the first days of June 1761, transports from America began to drop singly into Guadeloupe, the fleet having been dispersed by a storm. By June 3, four ships had arrived, together with Lord Rollo, who had been appointed by Amherst to take the command.

On June 4, the whole of these British ships, together with one ship more from Guadeloupe itself, made sail under escort of the squadron of Sir James Douglas, the admiral on the Leeward Islands station, to beat back against the trade wind to Dominica. The force consisted of:

- a detachment from the garrison of Guadeloupe (300 men)
- Highlanders (400 men)
- 22nd Regiment of Foot
- 94th Vaughan's Regiment of Foot

The landing consisted of Colonel Rollo, the Brigadier-General in America, in command of the troops, and Commodore Douglas, Commander-in-Chief at the Leeward Islands, in command of the four ships of the line, Montague, Sutherland, Belliqueux, his flag ship the Dublin, and two frigates.

On June 6 by noon, the British force had arrived before Roseau, where the inhabitants were summoned to surrender. The French replied by manning their batteries and other defences, which included four separate lines of entrenchments, ranged one above another. Rollo landed his men and entered the town. Fearing that the French might be reinforced in the night, he resolved, though it was already late, to storm the entrenchments immediately. He attacked and drove out the French in confusion with trifling loss to himself. The French commander and his second were both taken prisoners. After this engagement, resistance ceased.

On June 7, Dominica swore allegiance to King George III.

== Aftermath ==
Unlike Guadeloupe and Martinique, the 1763 Treaty of Paris did not return Dominica to France. The French captured and held Dominica island and France during the American War of Independence between 1778 and 1783, after which it was returned to British control. It remained in British hands until its independence in 1978.

== Gallery ==
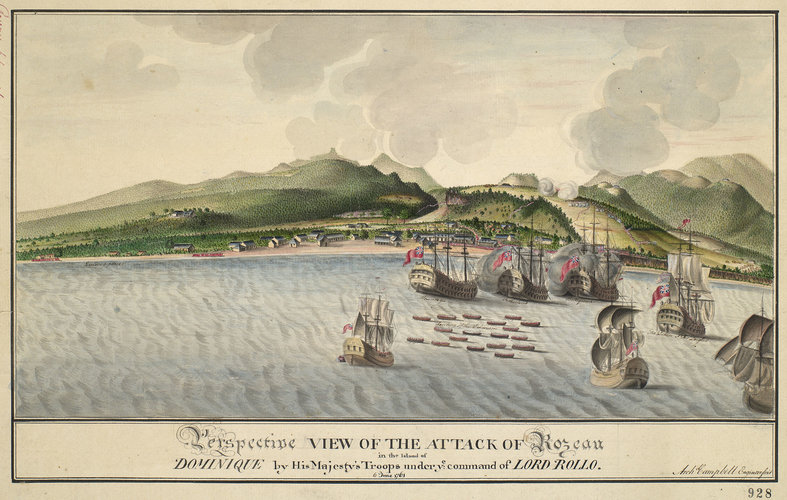
Another view by Archibald Campbell

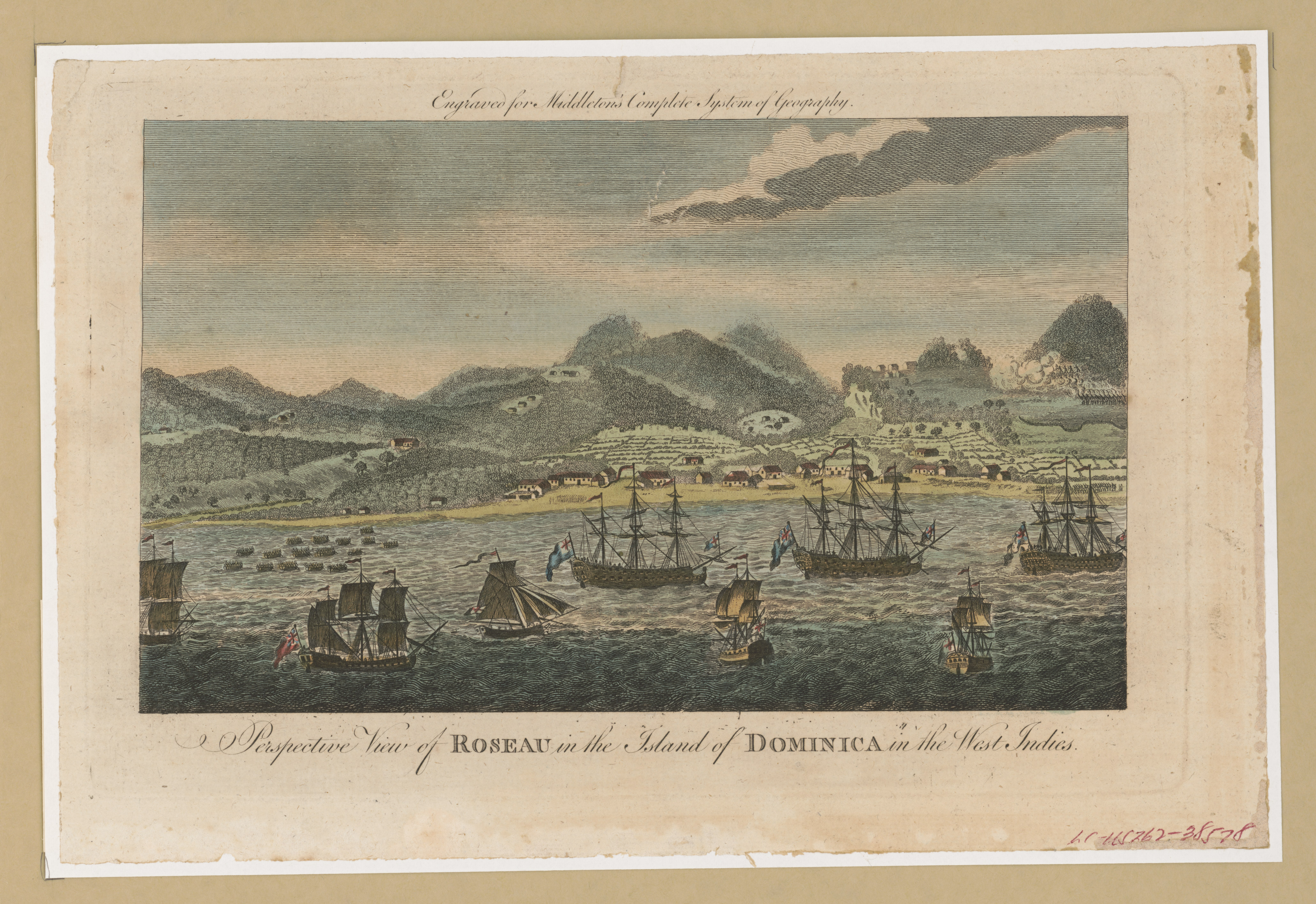
An alternative view of the attack underway

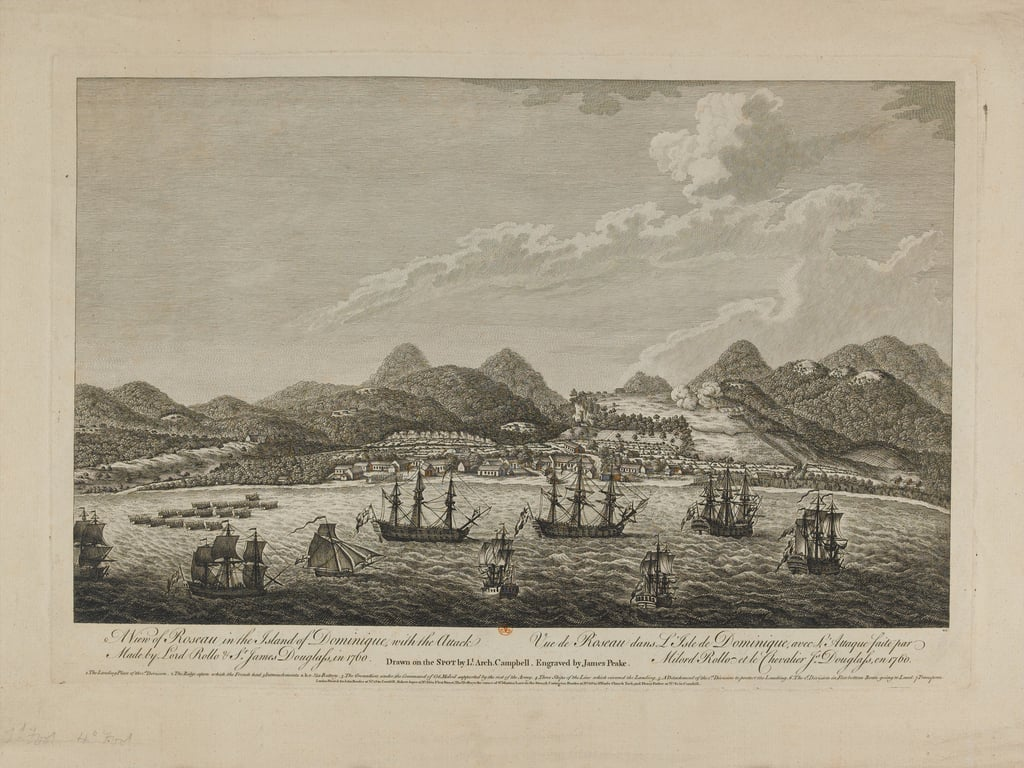
This view credited to Campbell
