= 94th Infantry Division Memorial Highway =

The 94th Infantry Division Memorial Highway is a name given to several U.S. highways:

- Route 94, in New Jersey
- NY 94, in New York
- Route 94, in Connecticut
- PA 94, in Pennsylvania
- A short stretch of Interstate 94 in Michigan
