= 94th Brigade =

94th Brigade may refer to:

== Spain ==
- 94th Mixed Brigade

== United Kingdom ==
- 94th Infantry Brigade (United Kingdom)
- 94th Brigade, Royal Field Artillery, a British Army unit during World War I
- 94th (Dorset and Somerset Yeomanry) Brigade, Royal Field Artillery, a British Army unit after World War I
- 94th (Somerset Yeomanry) Brigade, Royal Field Artillery, a British Army unit after World War I

== United States ==
- 94th Air Defense Artillery Brigade

== See also ==
- 94th Division (disambiguation)
- 94th Regiment (disambiguation)
