= 94th Regiment of Foot (1760) =

- Active: 1760–1763
- Country: Kingdom of Great Britain
- Branch: British Army
- Type: Line Infantry
- Role: Infantry
- Size: One battalion
- Engagements: Seven Years' War; French and Indian War

The 94th Regiment of Foot was a British Army regiment formed in Wales in January 1760. It saw action in North America later in the year during the French and Indian War and then took part, alongside the Royal Marines, in the Capture of Belle Île in April 1761 during the Seven Years' War, before sailing for the West Indies later in the year. In the West Indies it took part in the Invasion of Dominica in June 1761. The invasion was led by Lord Rollo who had been appointed by Lord Amherst to take command. The regiment went on to take part in the Invasion of Martinique in January 1762. It was disbanded in 1763.

The regiment was commanded throughout its existence by Lieutenant-Colonel John Vaughan (later promoted Lieutenant-General).
