= Junkers Ju 322 =

Military glider in the Luftwaffe

Ju 322 Mammut
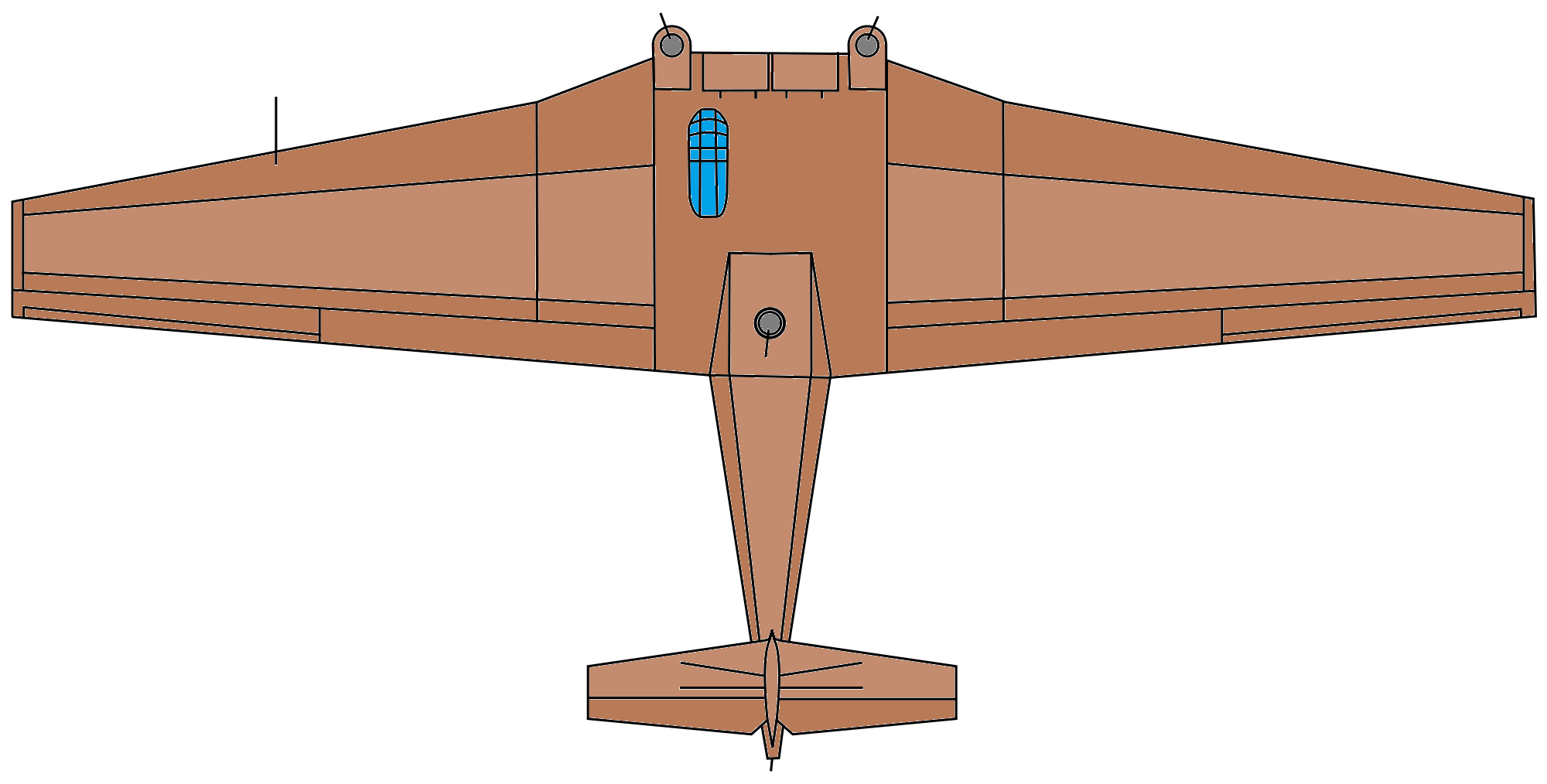

General information
- Type: Heavy transport glider
- Manufacturer: Junkers Flugzeug- und Motorenwerke AG
- Designer: Heinrich Hertel
- Primary user: Luftwaffe
- Number built: 2

History
- First flight: April 1941

The Junkers Ju 322 Mammut (German for mammoth) was a heavy transport military glider, resembling a giant flying wing, proposed for use by the Luftwaffe in World War II; only two prototypes were completed, a further 98 were scrapped before completion.

== Development ==
Designed in late 1940 by Junkers as the Junkers EF 094, the Ju 322 was to fulfill the same role as the Me 321 Gigant heavy transport glider. Fulfilling a requirement to be built out of non-strategic materials, using all-wooden construction, the Ju 322 was to be able to carry 20,000 kg (44,000 lb) of cargo, equivalent to either a Panzer IV tank, a 88 mm anti-aircraft gun, a half-track or a self propelled gun, including attendant personnel, ammunition and fuel. The cargo door was located in the centre section of the leading edge of the wing, with the cockpit offset to the port side above the cargo bay. The glider's tailplane extended from the centre section, and had a typical arrangement of stabilizing fins and vertical rudder. Armament for production gliders would have consisted of three manned turrets, each with a single 7.92 mm MG 15 machine gun.

== Testing ==
During construction of the first prototype (Ju 322 V1), problems were encountered with building an all-wooden glider as Junkers did not have expertise in the use of such materials. A test with a battle tank compacted the cargo floor, leading to redesign, further reducing the payload. Consequently, the planned payload weight for the Ju 322 was reduced to 16,000 kg (35,000 lb; 16 long tons), and later to 11,000 kg (24,000 lb; 11 long tons).

The Ju 322 V1 made its maiden flight in April 1941, towed by a Junkers Ju 90 four-engined transport. The test flight was largely successful after the Ju 90 had managed, with some effort, to tow the glider off the ground before running out of runway. However, the Ju 322 quickly gained height above the Ju 90 and so pulled the tug's tail up and prevented it from climbing and releasing the tow cable at the right height. The glider was also highly unstable under tow. After being released, it stabilized but landed in a field from which it took two weeks to be towed back to the launch airfield by tanks. Although design improvements were planned for the Ju 322, the RLM ordered the Ju 322 project dropped in May 1941, considering it an inherently poor design.

Following the cancellation of the project, the Ju 322 V1 completed a few more test flights, but was cut up for fuel along with the Ju 322 V2 and 98 partially completed gliders.

== Specifications Ju 322 V1 ==

Data from German Aircraft of the Second World War

General characteristics

- Crew: 3
- Capacity: 140 troops or 20,000 kg (44,000 lb) of cargo (estimated), limited to 12,000 kg (26,000 lb)
- Length: 30.25 m (99 ft 3 in)
- Wingspan: 62 m (203 ft 5 in)
- Height: 3.08 m (10 ft 1 in)
- Wing area: 595 m^{2} (6,400 sq ft)
- Empty weight: 25,401 kg (56,000 lb)
- Gross weight: 40,823 kg (89,999 lb)

Armament

- Guns: 3 × 7.92 mm (0.312 in) MG 15 machine-guns

== See also ==
Aircraft of comparable role, configuration, and era

- Messerschmitt Me 321
- General Aircraft Hamilcar
