= MG 15 =

WWII-era German aircraft machine gun

MG 15 machine gun
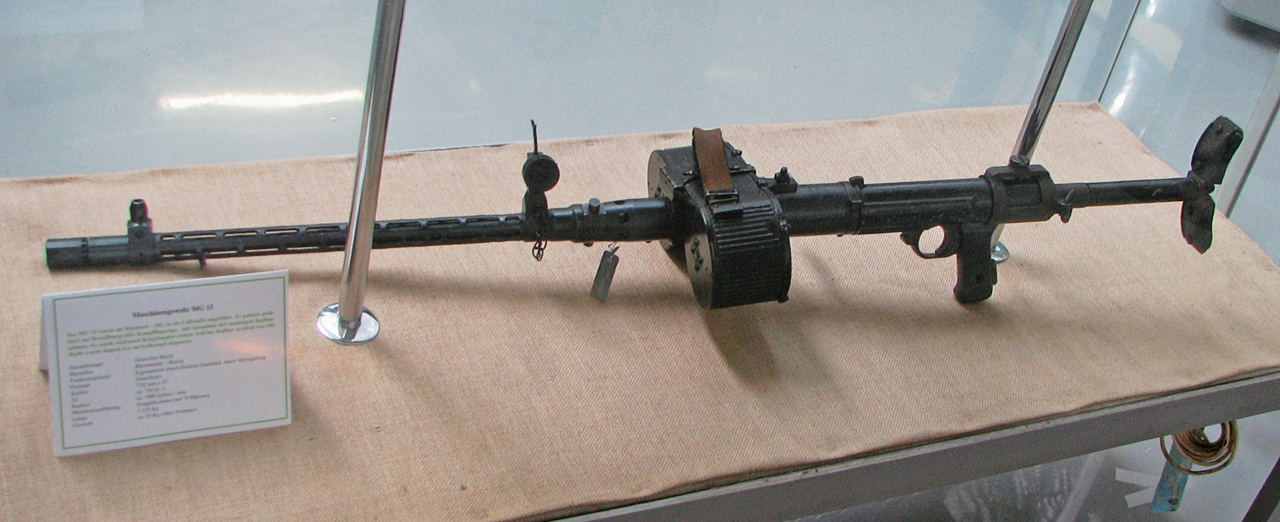
- An MG 15 equipped for infantry use, but lacking the bipod. German Tank Museum, Munster (2006)
- Type: Aircraft machine gun
- Place of origin: Weimar Republic / Nazi Germany

Service history
- In service: 1933–1950s (MG 15)
- Used by: See § Users
- Wars: World War II; Korean War

Production history
- Designer: Theodor Bergmann
- Designed: 1932
- Manufacturer: See § Manufacturers

Specifications
- Mass: 12.4 kg (27 lb) (Loaded) (Note: Weight with gunsight and cartridge bag.); 8.1 kg (18 lb) (Unloaded)
- Length: 1,078 mm (42.4 in) (without attachments)
- Barrel length: 600 mm (24 in)
- Cartridge: 7.92×57mm Mauser
- Cartridge weight: 35.5 grams (Full round) (Note: Cartridge: 24 grams; Bullet: 11.5 grams)
- Caliber: 7,9 (7.92+0.04) mm
- Action: Recoil-operated
- Rate of fire: 1,000–1,050 rounds/min
- Muzzle velocity: 755 m/s (2,480 ft/s)
- Feed system: 75-round double-drum magazine (Note: Loaded weight: 4.24 kg (9.3 lb); Unloaded weight: 2.27 kg (5.0 lb); 2-part loader: 0.72 kg (1.6 lb))
- Sights: Various types

The MG 15 was a German 7.92 mm machine gun designed specifically as a hand-manipulated defensive gun for combat aircraft during the early 1930s. By 1941 it was replaced by other types and found new uses with ground troops.

== History ==
The MG 15 was developed from the MG 30, which was designed by Rheinmetall using the locking system invented by Louis Stange in the mid to late 1920s. Though it shares the MG 15 designation with the earlier gun built by Bergmann, the MG 15nA (for neuer Art, meaning new model having been modified from an earlier design) has nothing in common with the World War II gun except the model number. The World War I gun used a tipping lock system while the WWII aircraft gun uses a rotating bolt and lockring. The World War II MG 15 was used in nearly all Luftwaffe aircraft with a flexible-mount defensive position.

Starting in late 1940 the MG 15 was replaced by the belt-fed Mauser 7.92 mm MG 81, MG 81Z (twin-MG 81), MG 131 13 mm machine guns, or MG 151/20 20 mm cannons. As they became redundant in their original role, many MG 15s were modified for infantry use, and a carrying device was also issued that held three of the saddle-drums. (Note: There are a number of pictures showing the guns, both aircraft and ground versions, with 25-round magazines from another machine-gun, the MG 13, however the magazines are not compatible with the MG 15.) The official total of conversions was about 17,648 by January 1, 1944, although the actual number may have been greater.

During the war, the MG 15 was exported to Romania as the ST 61. But it was never used and was kept in storage.

== Design ==
It was a modular design with various attachments that could be quickly attached or removed. The bolt mechanism acted as a traditional open-bolt machinegun design, in which the bolt will slam forward when empty, and require re-cocking either before or after a new magazine was fitted in order to be able to fire again.

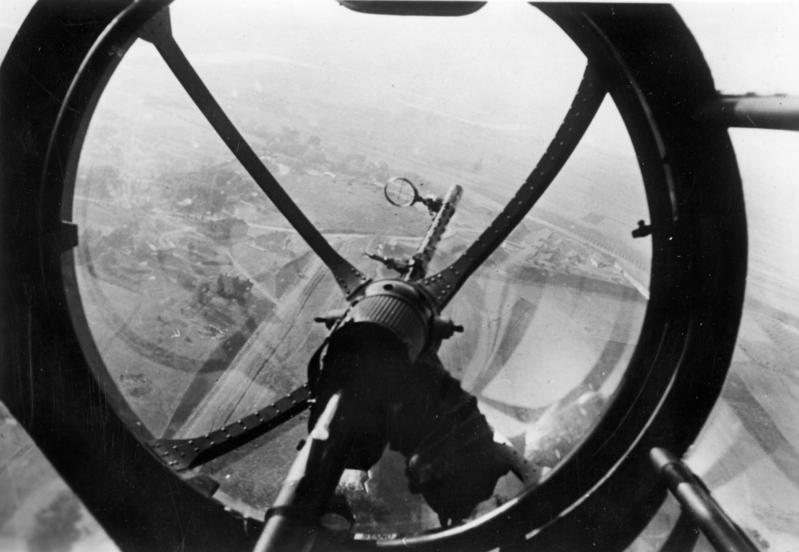
An MG 15 in Heinkel He 111, Poland, September 1939

The MG 15 fires from an open bolt, meaning that the bolt stays back when the gun is ready to fire, and is thus unsuitable for "through the propeller" synchronized forward firing on a fuselage mount. Pulling the trigger releases the bolt and allows it to go forward, stripping a round from the magazine. The bolt continues pushing the round into the chamber and locks up when the lockring rotates and locks the bolt and barrel extension together. At this point the trip lever releases the firing pin and the gun fires. Recoil pushes the barrel, lock and bolt backwards until the lockring hits a cam that rotates it unlocking the bolt and barrel. Inertia carries the bolt backwards until the base of the fired case hits the ejector, flinging the empty out of the receiver. If the trigger is held down the cycle will continue. If the trigger is released the bolt will remain in the rearward position.

The "saddle-drum" magazine was so called because it straddled the gun, with two inversely symmetrical spiral drums that fitted on either side of the receiver. The 75 rounds of ammunition (not 150 as is often mistakenly claimed) was shared evenly by both drums and as the gun fired, converged under spring tension towards the centre and from thence passed downwards into the action. The MG 15, having a firing rate of over 1,000 rpm, could empty the magazine in 4.5 seconds or less, and typical practice was to provide at least 10 spare magazines for each gun on the aircraft. This still left the gunner with the problem of reloading in combat, offering a brief opportunity for enemy fighters to attack with impunity.

== Type 98/Type 1 Machine gun ==
Army Type 98 / Navy Type 1 machine gun
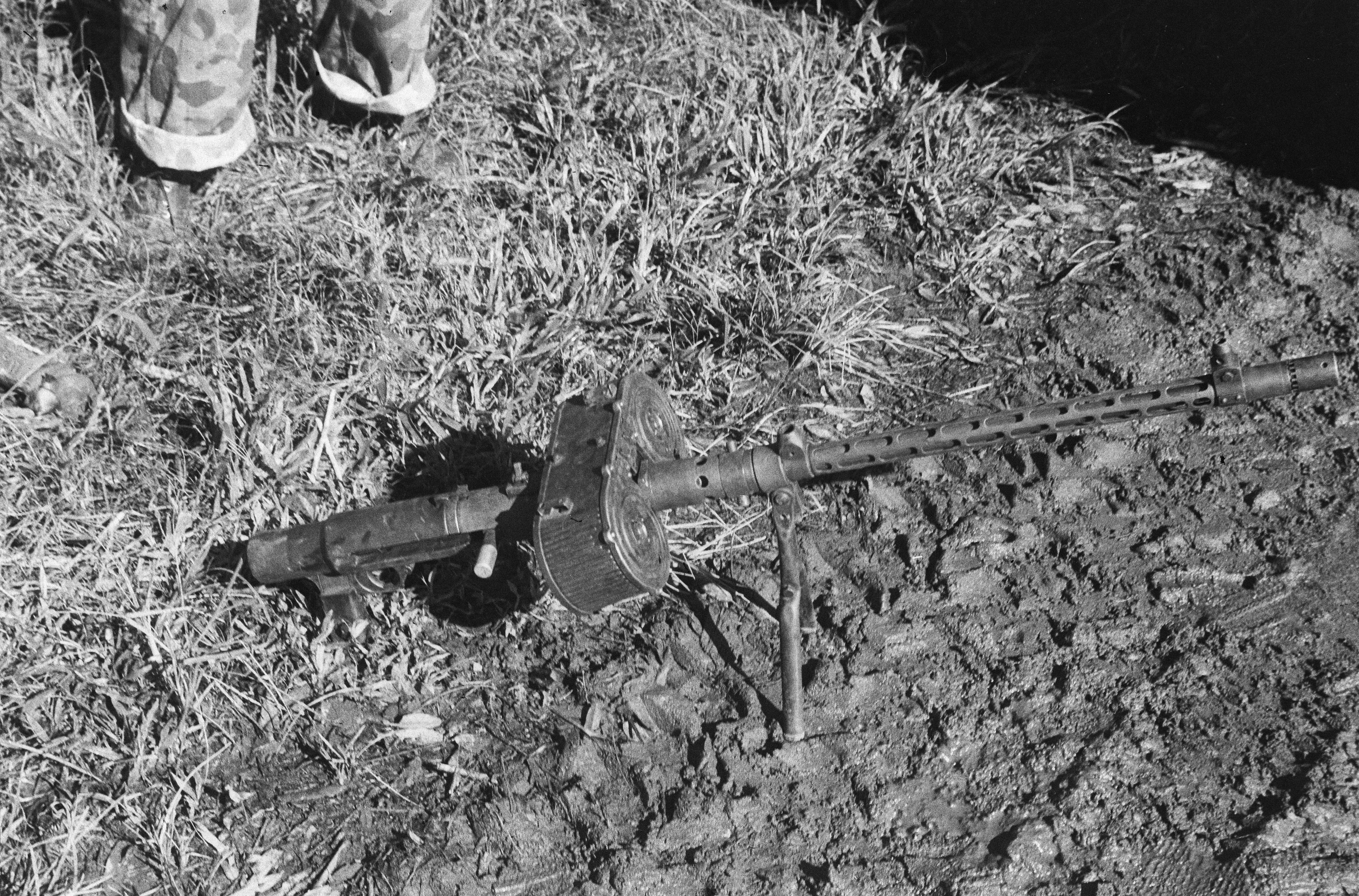
- Army Type 98 or late-variant Navy Type 1 with bipod for field use, captured by Dutch forces in Indonesia, 1947
- Type: Machine gun
- Place of origin: Empire of Japan

Service history
- In service: 1938–1945 (Type 98); 1941–1945 (Type 1)
- Used by: See § Users

Production history
- Manufacturer: See § Manufacturers

Specifications
- Mass: 7.2 kg (16 lb)
- Length: 1,078 mm (42.4 in)
- Barrel length: 600 mm (24 in)
- Cartridge: 7.92×57mm Mauser
- Rate of fire: 1,000 rounds/min
- Muzzle velocity: 750 m/s (2,500 ft/s)
- Feed system: 75-round double-drum magazine
- Sights: Iron

The license-produced MG 15 was used in Japanese aircraft as the Type 98 flexible-mounted machine gun and as the Type 1 in the Imperial Japanese Navy. Type 98 machine guns were also used by the Communist forces during the Korean War.

== Manufacturers ==
MG 15

- Bergmann (Weimar Republic)
- Rheinmetall (Third Reich)

Type 98

- Nagoya Army Arsenal

Type 1

- Nagoya Army Arsenal
- Tagajo Naval Arsenal
- Yokosuka Naval Arsenal

== Users ==
- Germany
- Japan
  - Imperial Japanese Army (Type 98)
  - Imperial Japanese Navy (Type 1)
- North Korea
  - Korean People's Army (Type 98)
- Romania
- Turkey

== See also ==
- Type 98/Type 1 machine gun

== Gallery ==
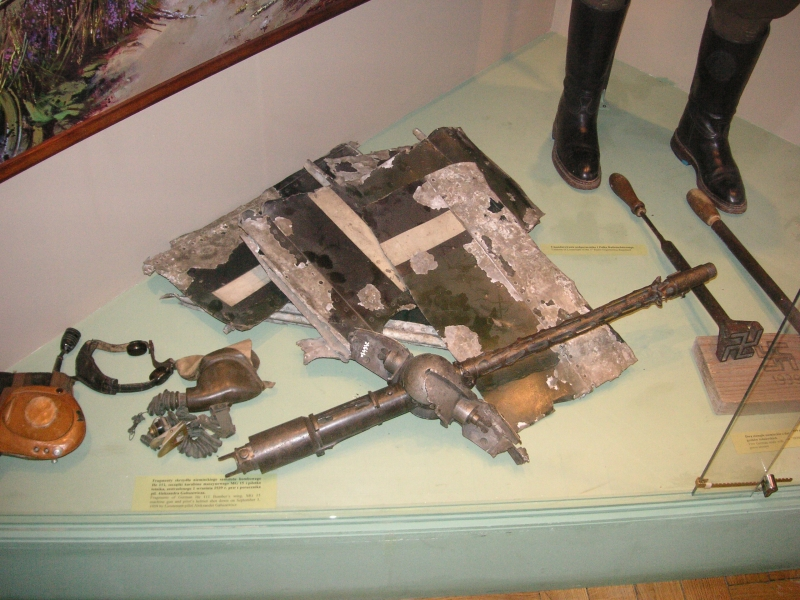
Debris of a downed Heinkel He 111 along with the barrel of an MG 15. Polish Army Museum, Warsaw (2006).

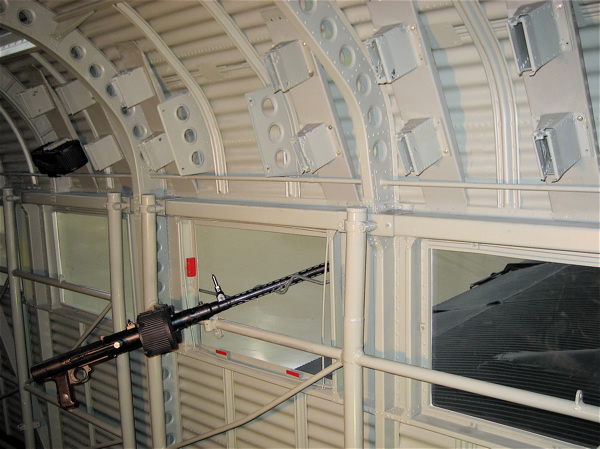
World War II-era German MG 15 type mounted aboard aircraft with anti-aircraft sight present near the tip of the barrel and lacking the infantry-variant butt-stock at the rear
