= List of Hero of the Soviet Union forfeitures =

The title Hero of the Soviet Union was awarded over 12,000 times. 136 of the people awarded it were stripped of the title, of which 51 were later rehabilitated and returned the title. 16 recipients were executed.

== Revoked and not restored ==
- Viktor Aleksandrov ru
- Vasily Anikovich ru
- Bronislav Antilevsky ru
- Georgy Antonov ru
- Nikolai Arsenev ru
- Nikolai Artamonov ru
- Fyodor Belesta ru
- Vladimir Bannykh ru
- Vladimir Bobylyov ru
- Andrey Bykasov ru
- Semyon Bychkov
- Vasily Vanin ru
- Sergey Varentsov ru
- Georgy Vershinin ru
- Nikolai Vorobyov ru
- Lev Gitman ru
- Viktor Gladilin ru
- Fyodor Golubitsky ru
- Vasily Grigin ru
- Vasily Grichuk ru
- Ivan Dobrobabin ru
- Ivan Dunaev ru
- Pyotr Zolin ru
- Valentin Ivanov ru
- Sergey Ivanov ru
- Pavel Ivashkin ru
- Impanuil Ignatev ru
- Nikolai Kazakov ru
- Tishebai Karabaev ru
- Ivan Kilyushek ru
- Vasily Konkov ru
- Ivan Korovin ru
- Anton Kravchenko ru
- Pyotr Kuznetsov ru
- Nikolai Kukushkin ru
- Aleksey Kulak
- Nikolai Kulba ru
- Pyotr Kutsy ru
- Aleksey Lashko ru
- Yefim Lev ru
- Mikhail Lelyakin ru
- Nikolai Litvinenko ru
- Aleksandr Loginov ru
- Nikolai Loktionov ru
- Boris Lunin ru
- Vasily Lynnik ru
- Nikolai Magdik ru
- Nikolai Malyshev ru
- Ivan Medvedev ru
- Pyotr Mesnyakin ru
- Ivan Mironenko ru
- Semyon Mishustin ru
- Aleksandr Morozov ru
- Anatoly Motsny
- Ivan Naumkin ru
- Mikhail Osipenko ru
- Sergey Panfyorov ru
- Vladimir Pasyukov ru
- Yegen Pilosyan ru
- Pyotr Poloz ru
- Aleksandr Postolyuk ru
- Kamal Pulatov ru
- Valentin Purgin ru
- Nikolai Rykhlin ru
- Nikolai Salomakhin ru
- Nikolai Severilov ru
- Ivan Serov
- Yegor Sidorenko ru
- Anatoly Sinkov ru
- Nikolai Skidin ru
- Grigory Sokl ru
- Yemelyan Sokol ru
- Anatoly Stanev ru
- Nikolai Tokarev ru
- Eduard Tyakhe ru
- Mikhail Chebotkhov ru
- Edin Chernogoryuk ru
- Aleksey Chernogubov ru
- Pyotr Chizhikov ru
- Grigory Chirkov ru
- Aleksandr Shapovalov ru
- Aleksandr Shilkov ru
- Dmitry Shtoda ru
- Vladimir Yusupov ru
- Vasily Yashin ru

== Revoked, but later restored ==
- Viktor Agienko ru
- Nikolai Aleksandrov ru
- Valentin Andrusenko ru
- Nikolai Antonov ru
- Nikifor Afanasev ru
- Leonid Baklanov ru
- Aleksey Blinov ru
- Pyotr Braiko
- Josef Buršík
- Mikhail Vasilyev ru
- Filipp Gerasimov ru
- Vasily Gordov
- Mikhail Grabsky
- Nikolai Davidovich ru
- Khansultan Dachiev
- Nikifor Yevtushenko ru
- Pyotr Yefimov ru
- Aleksandr Ivanov ru
- Viktor Ilchenko ru
- Ivan Kondratev ru
- Grigory Koptilov ru
- Mikhail Kossa ru
- Aleksandr Krivets ru
- Vladimir Kryukov
- Nikolai Kudryashov ru
- Grigory Kulik
- Zamakhshyari Kunizhev ru
- Konstantin Lebedev ru
- Gavriil Lepyokhin ru
- David Margulis ru
- Arnold Meri
- Vasily Merkushev ru
- Ivan Mozgovoy ru
- Vladimir Morozov ru
- Pavel Nesterenko ru
- Aleksandr Novikov
- Dmitry Pavlov
- Ivan Primakin ru
- Ivan Proskurov
- Yevgeny Ptukhin
- Pyotr Pumpur
- Pavel Rychagov
- Vladimir Saprykin
- Yakov Smushkevich
- Mikhail Sysoev ru
- Makar Tkachyov ru
- Andrey Frolov ru
- Ivan Chernets ru
- Ernst Shakht
- Vladimir Shevchenko ru
- Grigory Shtern
