= 1941 in aviation =

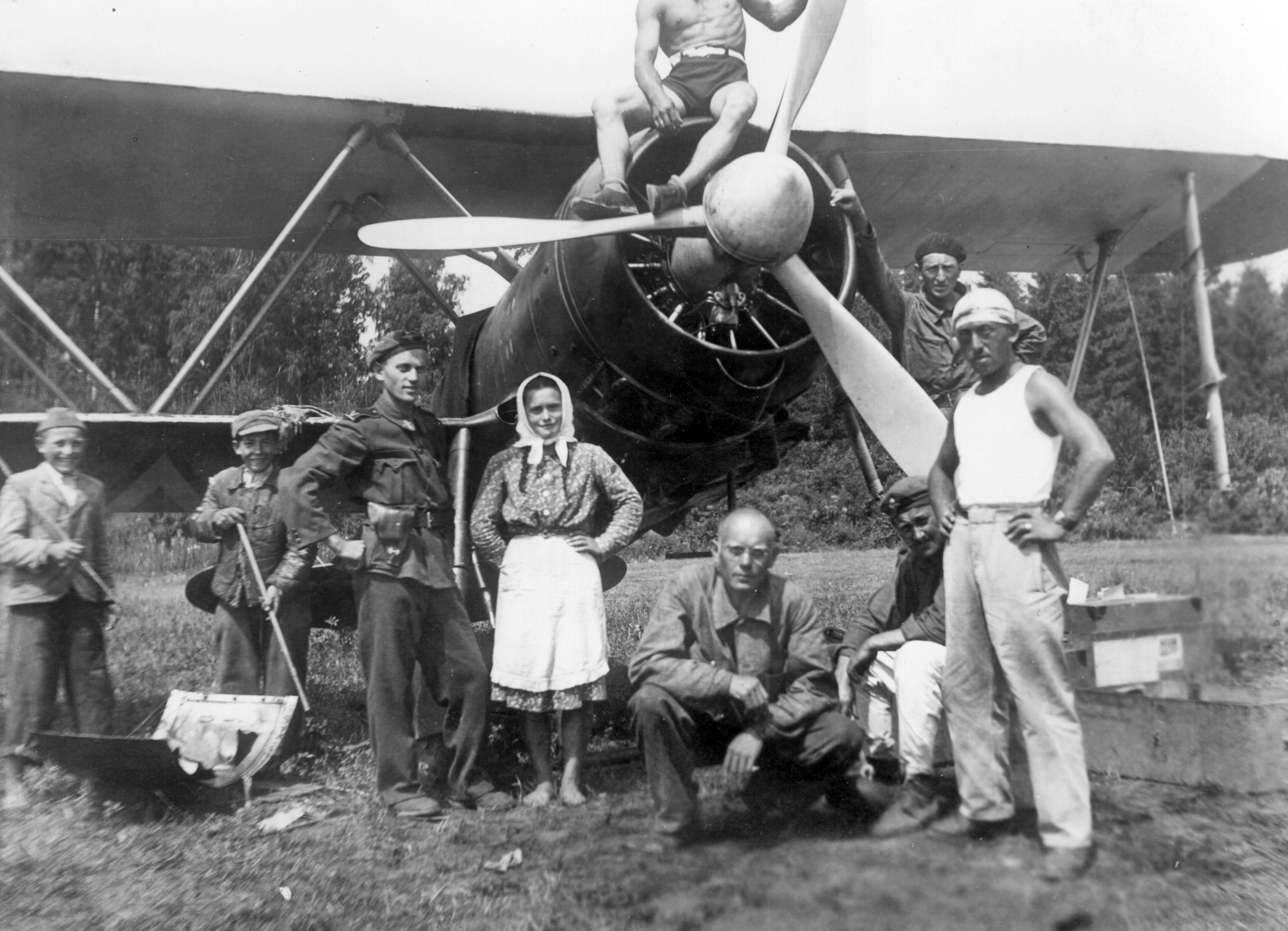
Repair of the Fiat Cr-42 fighter aircraft of the Royal Hungarian Air Force, 1941

This is a list of aviation-related events from 1941:

== Events ==
- During the spring and summer, the Imperial Japanese Navy's air arm conducts Operation 102, its second major bombing campaign against Chongqing.
- By early autumn, the Imperial Japanese Navy has turned all air operations in mainland China over to the Imperial Japanese Army.
- The Aeronautical Corporation of America renames itself Aeronca.
- The United States Navy retires the ZMC-2 and sells it for scrap. It is the only successfully operated metal-skinned airship ever built, completing 752 flights and logging 2,265 hours of flight time in nearly 12 years of U.S. Navy service at Naval Air Station Lakehurst, New Jersey.

=== January ===
- The Regia Aeronautica (Italian Royal Air Force) withdraws all bombers and biplane fighters from the Corpo Aereo Italiano (Italian Air Corps)—its expeditionary force based in Belgium for operations against the United Kingdom—leaving only Fiat G.50 Freccia monoplane fighters in the Corpo.
- The Imperial Japanese Navy forms its first air fleet, the Eleventh Air Fleet.
- Imperial Japanese Navy Vice Admiral Shigeyoshi Inoue argues that control of the sea will first require control of the air above it, that aircraft could achieve this control without assistance by aircraft carriers or other surface ships, and that land-based bombers and flying boats had become so potent that the aircraft carrier has become obsolete.
- January 5 – Ferrying an Airspeed Oxford from Prestwick, Scotland, to RAF Kidlington, England, pioneering English aviator Amy Johnson goes off course in poor weather, runs out of fuel, and bails out as her aircraft crashes into the Thames Estuary. The Royal Navy barrage balloon ship HMS Haslemere attempts to rescue her, but a swell pushes her into the ship's propellers, which kill her. Her body is never recovered.
- January 7 – Adolf Hitler orders Luftwaffe Focke-Wulf Fw 200 Condor aircraft to begin supporting German U-boat operations in the Atlantic Ocean.
- January 9 – 10 Italian bombers attack a Gibraltar-to-Malta convoy escorted by the British aircraft carriers HMS Ark Royal and HMS Illustrious, scoring no hits and losing two of their number to Fairey Fulmar fighters from Ark Royal.
- January 9–10 (overnight) – 135 British bombers attack oil targets in Gelsenkirchen, Germany.
- January 10 – German aircraft make their combat debut in the Mediterranean theater. German Junkers Ju 87 Stuka dive bombers and Junkers Ju 88s of Fliegerkorps X join Italian bombers in attacking the British aircraft carrier HMS Illustrious in the Mediterranean while she is escorting the Gibraltar-to-Malta convoy. The Italian attacks are ineffective, but the German aircraft score six hits, knocking Illustrious out of action until the end of November.
- January 11 – Fliegerkorps X aircraft continue attacks on the Gibraltar-to-Malta convoy, damaging the light cruiser HMS Gloucester and fatally damaging the light cruiser HMS Southampton.
- January 16 – 60 German dive bombers make a massed attack on the Malta Dockyard in an attempt to destroy the damaged British aircraft carrier HMS Illustrious, but she receives only one bomb hit. Incessant German and Italian bombing raids will target Malta through March, opposed by only a handful of British fighters.
- January 17 – During the French-Thai War, the Battle of Ko Chang opens with a bombing attack on Royal Thai Navy warships at Ko Chang, Thailand, by a French Loire 130 flying boat and ends with Royal Thai Air Force aircraft bombing French warships. All air attacks in the battle are ineffective, although a Thai bomb which fails to explode hits the French light cruiser La Motte-Picquet.
- January 18 – A large German air raid strikes Malta's airfields and other facilities.
- January 19 – German aircraft again attack the Malta dockyard, causing underwater damage to HMS Illustrious.
- January 20 – Brazil merges the air arms of the Brazilian Army and Brazilian Navy to form an independent air force called the National Air Forces. The National Air Forces will be renamed the Brazilian Air Force in May.

=== February ===
- German aircraft begin high-altitude reconnaissance flights over the western Soviet Union. Joseph Stalin orders Soviet fighters and antiaircraft artillery not to oppose them.
- Under pressure from the United States Government, the Government of Peru cancels the licenses of the German-controlled airline Deutsche Lufthansa Sucursal en Peru and requisitions its fleet of two Junkers Ju 52s. Peru transfers the airline's operations to Pan American-Grace Airways, a U.S. airline, at the same time.
- February 2 – Eight Fairey Swordfish aircraft from the British aircraft carrier HMS Ark Royal attack the dam at San Chiar d'Ula, Sardinia, with torpedoes, but inflict no visible damage on the dam.
- February 5 – The Air Training Corps is formed in the United Kingdom, superseding the Air Defence Cadet Corps.
- February 8 – A fleet of Junkers Ju 52s is used to airlift German troops to North Africa.
- February 10 – Britain uses paratroops for the first time in an attack on Tragino
- February 10–11 (overnight) – 222 British bombers attack Hanover, Germany, losing seven of their number, and 43 others attack oil storage tanks in Rotterdam in the Netherlands. In the Rotterdam raid, the Short Stirling makes its combat debut as the United Kingdom's first four-engined heavy bomber.
- February 20 – A Lockheed Hudson Mark III bomber crashes at Musgrave Harbor on Newfoundland in the Dominion of Newfoundland due to engine failure soon after takeoff from Gander, leading to three deaths, including that of Canadian medical scientist, physician, painter, and Nobel laureate Sir Frederick Banting, who succumbs to his injuries on February 21. Noted as the first person to use insulin on humans, Banting is working on the design of pressure suits at the time of his death
- February 21 – The first flight by a British RAF flying boat through the "Donegal Corridor", neutral Republic of Ireland airspace between its base in Northern Ireland and the Atlantic Ocean, a concession secretly agreed by Taoiseach (i.e., Prime Minister) Éamon de Valera.
- February 24–25 (overnight) – The Avro Manchester bomber makes its combat debut in an RAF Bomber Command raid on Brest, France.
- February 26
  - Philippine Airlines is founded, making it Asia's first and oldest carrier, still to this day operating under its original name. It makes its first flight on March 15.
  - A Douglas DC-3 airliner operating as Eastern Airlines Flight 21 crashes outside of Atlanta. Among the eight dead is Maryland Congressman William D. Byron. Eight people survive, including the U.S. top-scoring ace of World War I and Eastern Airlines president Eddie Rickenbacker, who is gravely injured but eventually recovers.

=== March ===
- March 1 – New Zealand's first fighter squadron, the Royal New Zealand Air Force's No. 485 Squadron is formed.
- March 10–11 (overnight) – The Handley Page Halifax becomes the second British four-engined bomber to enter combat, as six Halifaxes of No. 35 Squadron join eight Bristol Blenheims in attacking Le Havre, France.
- March 11 – The Congress of the United States passes the Lend-Lease bill, paving the way for the provision of (amongst other equipment) 16,000 warplanes to the United Kingdom. Later Lend-Lease arrangements will supply other Allied nations.
- March 14 – A major dogfight fought between Chinese Air Force I-15/I-153 fighters against the Empire of Japan's newest air-superiority fighter aircraft; the A6M Zero over Shuangliu (Shuangguisi) air base, resulting in a great loss for the Chinese-side including the deaths of two of their top fighter-aces.
- March 26 – The United States Army redesignates the Northwest Air District as the Second Air Force, the Southeast Air District as the Third Air Force, and the Southwest Air District as the Fourth Air Force. They are responsible for the northwestern, southeastern, and southwestern United States, respectively.
- March 28 – During the Battle of Cape Matapan in the Mediterranean, Swordfish and Albacore torpedo bombers from the British aircraft carrier HMS Formidable and land-based Fleet Air Arm Swordfish from Maleme, Crete, damage the Italian battleship Vittorio Veneto and heavy cruiser Pola, slowing Pola. In the predawn darkness of the next morning, British battleships catch up to the damaged Pola and the four ships accompanying her – the heavy cruisers Zara and Fiume and two destroyers – and sink all five ships with gunfire.
- March 30 – The second prototype Heinkel He 280, the world's first turbojet-powered fighter aircraft, is first flown under its own power by Fritz Schäfer in Germany.

=== April ===
- The last aircraft of the Corpo Aereo Italiano (Italian Air Corps) return to Italy from Belgium, ending the participation of the Regia Aeronautica in attacks on England.
- The United States Department of War orders the U.S. Army's First, Second, Third, and Fourth Air Forces each to set up a separate bomber and interceptor command.
- The United States Navy makes its first attempts to interest commercial aviators in reporting submarine sightings.
- U.S. Navy officer Marc Mitscher proposes that the Navy develop amphibious gliders with flying-boat hulls with a goal of deploying an amphibious glider force capable of delivering an entire United States Marine Corps brigade of 715 men to a hostile beachhead, the gliders to be towed by Consolidated PBY-5A Catalina amphibian aircraft. The U.S. Navy's amphibious glider program will produce two prototype gliders before being terminated in September 1943.
- April 3 – The British aircraft carrier HMS Argus flies off 12 RAF Hawker Hurricanes to Malta from a point south of Sardinia.
- April 6 – Germany invades Yugoslavia and Greece.
- April 6–10 – In Operation Punishment, German Luftwaffe aircraft bomb Belgrade, Yugoslavia, killing 4,000 people. The Germans shoot down 20 Yugoslav Air Force fighters attempting to defend the city, while over the first two days the Germans lose at least 32 aircraft over Belgrade.
- April 9 – The United States Army redesignates the Northeast Air District as the First Air Force. It is responsible for the northeastern United States.
- April 15
  - The Central Aircraft Manufacturing Company (CAMCO) signs an agreement with the Chinese government to equip and administer the American Volunteer Group in China.
  - A German reconnaissance aircraft with a camera and exposed film of Soviet installations crashes near Rovno in the Soviet Union, but no Soviet attention to preparations for a possible German attack results.
  - Charles de Gaulle, the leader of the Free French forces, issues a formal declaration, requesting that French nationals serving the RAF apply to be incorporated into the Free French Air Force by 25 April. Their service in a foreign country's armed forces violated French civil law, but de Gaulle's declaration promises that they will face no charges of wrongdoing if they meet the 25 April deadline.
- April 16 – London comes under intense bomber attack, with nearly 900 tonnes (992 short tons) of high explosive dropped on the city.
- April 17 – Eighteen surviving Yugoslav Air Force aircraft flee Yugoslavia, bringing Yugoslav aerial resistance to the German invasion to an end. In its 11 days of combat, the Yugoslav Air Force attacked targets in Italy, Austria, Hungary, Romania, Bulgaria, Albania, and Greece and attacked German, Italian, and Hungarian troops.
- April 20 – South African Squadron Leader Marmaduke "Pat" Pattle is shot down and killed in a Hawker Hurricane over the Saronic Gulf off Piraeus, Greece, during a German bombing raid on the city. German and Italian records later confirm 27 aerial victories for him, although unofficial sources credit him with 44 and 50 victories, and as the leading Gloster Gladiator (15 kills) and Hawker Hurricane (35 kills) ace. Based on the unofficial totals, he is considered by some to be the RAF's World War II ace of aces.
- April 21–22 – Operating unopposed, German aircraft sink 23 ships in Greek waters, including a Greek destroyer and two hospital ships.
- April 23 – German Junkers Ju 87 dive bombers sink the Greek battleships Kilkis and Lemnos off Salamis Island, Greece, during the German invasion of Greece.
- April 27
  - HMS Argus flies off 23 RAF Hurricanes to Malta.
  - Evacuating British troops from Greece, the Dutch troopship Slamat is sunk by German Junkers Ju 87 Stuka dive bombers. The British destroyers HMS Diamond and HMS Wryneck rescue 700 survivors before themselves being sunk by the Stukas. Only 50 men ultimately survive from the three ships.

=== May ===
- Royal Navy Fairey Swordfish aircraft attack Vichy French shipping and shore targets in Syria.
- Royal Navy Swordfish of No. 814 Squadron from HMS Hermes assist in quelling a rebellion in Iraq, bombing the barracks at Samawa and Nasiriyah.
- Antishipping strikes by Malta-based RAF Bristol Blenheims and Fleet Air Arm Swordfish against Axis convoys in the Mediterranean in May and June will leave German and Italian forces in North Africa too short of ammunition to conduct a counteroffensive after defeating the British Operation Battleaxe in June.
- May 2 – The Anglo-Iraqi War between British forces and a pro-Axis Iraqi government begins with 41 RAF Station Habbaniya- and Shaibah-based planes launching a surprise attack against Iraqi forces surrounding Habbaniya and Iraqi airfields. Royal Iraqi Air Force aircraft respond. By the end of the day, the British have destroyed 22 Iraqi aircraft on the ground, losing five of their own.
- May 3–6 – RAF aircraft continue to attack Iraqi positions surrounding RAF Habbinya and Iraqi airfields, eventually forcing Iraq forces to withdraw on May 6.
- May 6 – Igor Sikorsky sets a world endurance record for helicopter flight of 1 hour 32 minutes, in a Sikorsky VS-300.
- May 6–7 (overnight) through 11–12 (overnight) – RAF Bomber Command mounts four major raids on Hamburg, Germany, over the course of six nights, averaging 128 bombers per raid. The second, third, and fourth raids combined kill 233, injure 713, and leave 2,195 homeless.
- May 7 – 40 RAF aircraft attack Iraqi reinforcements headed for Habbaniya, inflicting about 1,000 casualties and paralyzing the Iraqi column. Over the next few days, British aircraft destroy the remainder of the Royal Iraqi Air Force.
- May 10
  - Flying via Vichy French-controlled Syria, aircraft of the German Luftwaffe begin to arrive at Mosul, Iraq, to support Iraqi forces against the British under the command of Fliegerführer Irak.
  - Rudolf Hess parachutes into Scotland to try to negotiate an alliance with Britain against the Soviet Union.
  - 550 German bombers drop more than 700 tons (711 tonnes, 635,036 kg) of bombs on London, killing 1,500 people and seriously injuring 1,800.
- May 14
  - German aircraft begin daily bombing of Crete to soften it up for the upcoming German airborne assault on the island.
  - The RAF receives authorization to attack German aircraft on Vichy French airfields in Syria. British fighters disable two Heinkel He 111s on the ground at Palmyra, Syria.
- May 15
  - A German Junkers Ju 52 flies without permission from German-occupied Poland to Moscow without being detected or intercepted by the Soviet Air Defense Forces or Soviet Air Forces. The incident results in mass arrests of Soviet military personnel during the 1941 purge of the Soviet armed forces.
  - The first British turbojet aircraft, the Gloster E.28/39 "Pioneer", flies, at RAF Cranwell in Lincolnshire, England, piloted by Gloster's chief test pilot, Flight Lieutenant Gerry Sayer. It is the first jet flight by an Allied country.
  - During a parachute training flight in a Douglas R2D-1 over Kearny Mesa in San Diego, California, United States Marine Corps Second Lieutenant Walter S. Osipoff is pulled out of the aircraft by a cargo pack being dropped overboard and is left dangling in the plane's slipstream by a tangle of static lines. Seeing Osipoff's plight, United States Navy Lieutenant John Lowery and Aviation Chief Machinist's Mate John McCants take off from North Island in a Curtiss SOC-1 Seagull and rendezvous with the R2D. McCants grabs Osipoff at an altitude of 3,000 feet (910 meters) but finds it impossible to untangle him and lower him into the SOC's rear cockpit until the SOC accidentally bucks upward and its propeller saws off a small part of the R2D's tail cone and cuts the static lines. Both planes return safely, and the badly injured Osipoff eventually fully recovers. Lowery and McCants receive the Distinguished Flying Cross for the flight.
- May 15–16 – Iraqi and German aircraft attack a British column moving into Iraq from Palestine.
- May 18 – RAF aircraft bomb Iraqi positions around Fallujah and along the road from Fallujah to Baghdad.
- May 19 – 57 British aircraft attack Iraqi positions around Fallujah. dropping 10 tons (9,072 kg) of bombs as well as leaflets in 134 sorties. German aircraft attack RAF Habbaniya.
- May 20
  - Germany invades Crete in Operation Merkur ("Mercury"), the Luftwaffe's first large airborne assault and the first mainly airborne invasion in military history, dropping 10,000 paratroopers and 750 glider troops on the island; 610 bombers, dive-bombers, and fighters, 500 transport aircraft, and 80 gliders support the operation. The Germans encounter such unexpectedly heavy opposition from British and Commonwealth troops on the island that they fear the operation will fail.
  - Italian CANT Z.1007 high-level bombers sink the British destroyer HMS Juno south-east of Crete.
- May 21
  - Royal Australian Air Force Squadron Leader Roy Phillipps, a World War I flying ace credited with 15 victories, dies when the private plane he is aboard as a passenger strikes trees on takeoff and crashes at Archerfield, Queensland, Australia.
  - The British aircraft carrier HMS Argus flies off 43 RAF Hawker Hurricanes to Malta from a point south of Sardinia.
  - German airborne forces belatedly capture Maleme airfield on Crete, allowing an airlift of 5,000 German mountain troops to begin.
- May 22
  - A Royal Navy Fleet Air Arm Martin Maryland of 771 Naval Air Squadron based at Hatston in the Orkney Islands reports that the German battleship Bismarck has left Bergen, Norway, confirming that she is breaking out into the Atlantic Ocean.
  - German dive bombers attack a British naval task force as it retires westward after raiding caïques carrying German troops north of Crete. They sink the light cruisers HMS Fiji and HMS Gloucester and the destroyer HMS Greyhound and damage the battleship HMS Warspite and the light cruisers HMS Carlisle and HMS Naiad.
  - Brazil creates an Air Force Ministry and changes the name of its air force from National Air Forces to Brazilian Air Force.
  - The Brazilian School of Naval Aviation in Rio de Janeiro becomes Galeão Air Force Base. Rio de Janeiro–Galeão International Airport eventually will open on the site, sharing some facilities with the air force base.
- May 23
  - 24 German dive bombers attack the British destroyers HMS Kelly and HMS Kashmir as they attempt to retire after a patrol north of Crete the previous night, sinking both. Among the survivors is Captain Lord Louis Mountbatten.
  - German aircraft attack British positions around Fallujah for the first time, with little effect.
- May 24 – Nine Swordfish torpedo bombers from the British aircraft carrier HMS Victorious score a torpedo hit on the German battleship Bismarck in the North Atlantic Ocean, aggravating damage she had sustained early in the day in the Battle of Denmark Strait.
- May 26
  - 15 Swordfish from the British aircraft carrier HMS Ark Royal attack Bismarck, scoring two torpedo hits. One hit damages Bismarck's port rudder so badly that she becomes unmaneuverable, allowing British surface ships to catch and sink her the following morning.
  - German dive-bombers set the British infantry landing ship HMS Glenroy on fire, preventing her from bringing reinforcements to Crete.
  - Eight aircraft from the British aircraft carrier HMS Formidable raid the Axis airfield at Scarpanto. Retaliating German dive-bombers badly damage Formidable and a destroyer; the following day they also damage the battleship HMS Barham.
- May 27 – Twelve Italian Fiat CR.42 Falco bombers arrive at Mosul to support Iraqi forces against the British under the command of the German Fliegerführer Irak.
- May 29
  - Surviving elements of Fliegerführer Irak depart Iraq.
  - German dive-bombers attack a British naval task force as it retires from Crete with evacuated British troops aboard. They fatally damage the destroyer HMS Imperial, sink the destroyer HMS Hereward, and damage the light cruisers HMS Ajax, HMS Dido and HMS Orion. A single bomb that strikes Orion kills 260 and wounds 280.
  - The United States Army Air Corps forms Ferrying Command to fly newly manufactured aircraft across the Atlantic Ocean to the United Kingdom.
- May 30 – German bombers damage the Australian light cruiser HMAS Perth as she retires after evacuating troops from Crete. Two more British destroyers are damaged before the evacuation is complete.
- May 31 – The Anglo-Iraq War ends with the collapse of Iraqi resistance.

=== June ===
- The destruction of bridges along the Burma Road by Imperial Japanese Navy bombers based at Hanoi in French Indochina forces the road to close.
- The Japan Air Industries Company Ltd. and the International Aircraft Company Ltd. merge to form Nippon Kokusai Koku Kogyo K.K. (the Japan International Air Industries Company Ltd)., best known as Kokusai.
- June 1
  - German Junkers Ju 88 bombers sink the British light cruiser HMS Calcutta 100 nautical miles (190 kilometres) north of Alexandria, Egypt, as she retires after evacuating troops from Crete.
  - Germany completes the conquest of Crete. German airborne forces have suffered such heavy losses – probably 6,000 to 7,000 casualties and 284 aircraft lost – in the eleven days of fighting that Germany never again attempts a large airborne operation.
- June 2 – The United States Navy commissions USS Long Island (AVG-1), its first escort aircraft carrier – at the time designated an "aircraft escort vessel" (AVG) – at Norfolk Navy Yard in Portsmouth, Virginia.
- June 8 – General Yakov Smushkevich, the commander of the Soviet Air Forces from 1939 to 1940 who had overseen their poor performance during the Winter War with Finland, is arrested as part of the 1941 purge of the Soviet armed forces. He will be executed in October.
- June 8–July 8 – The British invade Syria, and aerial combat between British and Vichy French aircraft ensues.
- June 16
  - National Airport (the modern-day Ronald Reagan Washington National Airport) opens on land along the western shore of the Potomac River that technically belongs to Washington, D.C. In 1945, the United States Congress will redefine the land the airport occupies as being in Arlington, Virginia, to end confusion and disputes over local jurisdiction.
  - Official start of production at Ford's Willow Run facility (Air Force Plant 31) in Michigan. At its wartime peak, it will produce one B-24 bomber every hour.
- June 17 – The British Royal Navy commissions its first escort aircraft carrier, HMS Empire Audacity. She later will be renamed HMS Audacity and become the world's first escort carrier to deploy in combat.
- June 17–19 – Jackie Cochran becomes the first woman to fly a bomber across the Atlantic Ocean.
- June 20 – The United States Department of War creates the United States Army Air Forces, with General Henry H. Arnold as its first commander. As part of the reorganization, General Headquarters Air Force is renamed Air Force Combat Command; the new Army Air Forces organization consists of Air Force Combat Command (its combat element) with the logistics and training element of the earlier United States Army Air Corps now retaining this name for such elements, during the war years.
- June 22
  - Germany invades the Soviet Union (Operation Barbarossa). At sunrise, a Luftwaffe force of 500 bombers, 270 dive bombers, and 480 fighters make a surprise attack on 66 forward Soviet airbases, destroying over 100 Soviet Air Force aircraft on the ground at one base alone. By 13:30 hours, the Germans have destroyed 800 Soviet aircraft in exchange for ten of their own. By the end of the day, the Germans have destroyed 1,811 Soviet aircraft – 1,489 on the ground and 322 in the air.
  - Soviet Tupolev SB-2 and Ilyushin DB-3 bombers suffer heavy losses in attacks on German airfields near Warsaw; German fighters shoot down 20 out of 25 Soviet bombers on one raid.
  - During the first hour of Operation Barbarossa, Soviet pilot Lieutenant I. I. Ivanov of the 46th Fighter Air Regiment rams a Heinkel He 111, the first of 10 Soviet taran attacks against Luftwaffe combat aircraft that day and more than 200 during the war; Ivanov is killed in the ramming.
- June 23 – During the second day of Operation Barbarossa, the Soviets lose another 1,000 aircraft.
- June 24 – The commander of the Soviet Air Forces, General Pavel Rychagov, is arrested as part of the 1941 purge of the Soviet armed forces because he had called Soviet military aircraft "flying coffins". His wife, aviator Maria Nesterenko, will be arrested on 25 June for failing to denounce him as a state criminal. After Rygachov is tortured, they both will be executed in October.
- June 28
  - In the early morning hours, 35 British bombers attempting an attack on Bremen stray so far off course that they mistakenly bomb Hamburg – 110 km (68 mi) northeast of Bremen – instead, losing five of their number to German night fighters over the city while killing seven people, injuring 39, and leaving 280 homeless.
  - At the end of the first week of Operation Barbarossa, the Luftwaffe has destroyed 4,017 Soviet aircraft in exchange for 150 of its own.
- June 30
  - German fighter pilot Werner Mölders shoots down five Soviet bombers, bringing his aerial victory total to 82. He becomes the first pilot to surpass the World War I record of 80 victories set by Manfred von Richthofen in 1918 and the highest-scoring ace in history at the time.
  - Since January 1, the Soviet aviation industry has delivered 1,900 MiG-3, LaGG-1, and Yak-1 fighters, 458 Pe-2 bombers, and 249 Ilyushin Il-2 Shturmovik ground-attack aircraft to operational air units.

=== July ===
- July – The Lockheed P-38 Lightning fighter aircraft is introduced in the United States.
- July 1 – Vnukovo Airport opens southwest of Moscow in the Soviet Union's Russian Soviet Federated Socialist Republic.
- July 3–4 (overnight) – 90 British bombers attempting to attack the Krupp arms works and rail targets in Essen, Germany, scatter their bombs so widely that they bomb Bochum, Dortmund, Duisburg, Hagen, Wuppertal, and other cities as well as Essen. In Essen, they succeed only in inflicting minor housing damage, injuring two people.
- July 8 – A trial raid by three RAF Fortress I (B-17C) heavy bombers on the naval barracks at Wilhelmshaven, Germany, is the first combat use of any variant of the Boeing B-17 Flying Fortress, on the very same city where the USAAF's 8th Air Force would itself first hit Nazi Germany directly with later-model B-17s, eighteen months later.
- July 9 – Under attack at their airfield by a 27-aircraft Soviet Air Force bomber regiment, Luftwaffe Major Günther Lützow of Jagdgeschwader 3 and his Messerschmitt Bf 109F fighter unit take off and shoot down all 27 Soviet bombers without loss to themselves.
- July 15 – Luftwaffe ace Werner Mölders shoots down two Soviet aircraft, raising his victory total to 101. He becomes the first pilot to claim 100 victories.
- July 18 – The first RAF aircraft is equipped with radar.
- July 19 – Adolf Hitler issues Directive 33, ordering the Luftwaffe to conduct a series of air raids against Moscow.
- July 22 – During the month since the beginning of Operation Barbarossa on June 22, the Luftwaffe has averaged 2,500 sorties per day in operations in the Soviet Union, and at times has achieved 3,000 per day.
- July 23 – During Operation Substance, Italian high-level and torpedo bombers attack a resupply convoy of six fast store ships bound for Malta escorted by a British naval forces including the aircraft carrier HMS Ark Royal. The high-level bombers are ineffective and Fairey Fulmars from Ark Royal shoot down two of them, but the six torpedo bombers fatally damage the destroyer HMS Fearless and cripple the light cruiser HMS Manchester.
- July 28 – The Vichy government agrees to build German aircraft in France.
- July 30 – 24 aircraft from the British aircraft carrier HMS Furious strike Petsamo, Finland, sinking a small steamer for the loss of three aircraft, while 29 aircraft from the carrier HMS Victorious attack Kirkenes, Norway, sinking a small ship and setting fire to another and claiming three German fighters shot down in exchange for the loss of 11 British aircraft.
- July 31 – A chartered Philippine Airlines Douglas DC-4 ferries 40 American servicemen to Oakland, California, from Nielson Airport in Makati, Manila, in the Philippine Islands with stops at Guam, Wake Island, Johnston Atoll, and Honolulu in the Territory of Hawaii. The flight makes Philippine Airlines, Asia's first airline, the first Asian airline to cross the Pacific Ocean. Philippine Airlines will begin a scheduled transpacific service in December.

=== August ===
- RAF Bomber Command conducts the first operational tests of prototypes of the Gee navigation aboard bombers. The loss of a Vickers Wellington equipped with Gee over Germany on August 13 raises fears that the Germans have captured Gee and will counter it, and no further test flights occur over Germany.
- August 1
  - The Soviet Union makes the first operational use of parasite fighters, attacking Constanţa with modified Polikarpov I-16s carried into action by Tupolev TB-3s.
  - The United States embargoes the sale of aviation fuel to Japan.
- August 6
  - After running out of ammunition, Soviet National Air Defense Forces pilot Viktor Talalikhin rams a German Heinkel He 111 bomber over Moscow with his Polikarpov I-16 fighter, destroying both aircraft. Talalikhin parachutes to safety. It is the first aerial night ramming in history.
  - Two squadrons of United States Navy flying boats are based at Reykjavík, Iceland, to conduct flights as part of the Neutrality Patrol.
- August 7 – Bruno Mussolini, the commander of the Italian 274a Squadriglia (274th Squadron) and son of Italian dictator Benito Mussolini, is killed along with two other crew members when the Piaggio P.108B bombers he is piloting flies too low and crashes into a house near San Giusto Airport in Pisa, Italy. Five crewmen are injured.
- August 7–8 (overnight) – 13 Ilyushin DB-3 bombers of the Soviet Navy's Baltic Fleet Air Force conduct a raid on Berlin without loss. It is the first Soviet air raid against Berlin and the first of ten Soviet Naval Aviation raids on Berlin in August and September 1941.
- August 9
  - Flying a Dornier Do 215B-5 night fighter, Luftwaffe Oberleutnant Ludwig Becker achieves Germany's first aerial victory employing airborne radar, using a low-UHF-band Lichtenstein radar to detect and close with a British Vickers Wellington bomber participating in a raid on Hamburg, Germany, before shooting down the Wellington.
  - Flying a Supermarine Spitfire Mk VA, RAF ace Douglas Bader is shot down during a dogfight with Luftwaffe Messerschmitt Bf 109s over the coast of France. He parachutes from the aircraft, is captured, and spends the rest of World War II as a German prisoner-of-war. He is credited with 20 aerial victories, four shared victories, six probables, one shared probable, and 11 enemy aircraft damaged before his capture.
- August 11 – The last major dogfight between Chinese Air Force fighter aircraft against the IJNAF A6M Zero fighters, before all Zero fighter squadrons were pulled-out of China for Operation Z (the exercises/preparations for the Pearl Harbor attack mission in December).
- August 11–12 – The Soviet Air Force makes its first raid on Berlin, as 11 Petlyakov Pe-8s arrack the city. German defenses shoot down five Pe-8s, and Soviet antiaircraft artillery mistakenly shoots down another as it returns to base.
- August 18
  - The Butt Report is issued. It reveals a widespread failure of RAF Bomber Command aircraft to deliver their payloads to the correct target.
  - The U.S. Navy commissions Naval Air Station Midway at Midway Atoll.
- August 27
  - The German submarine U-570 surrenders to an RAF Lockheed Hudson patrol bomber 80 nautical miles (150 kilometres) south of Iceland. No other German submarine surrenders to enemy forces during World War II prior to the final days of the war.
  - Former Australian senator Charles Hardy and two other men are killed when an Airlines of Australia de Havilland Puss Moth crashes into the Coen River 2 miles (3.2 km) outside of Coen, Queensland, on a flight from Thursday Island to Cairns.

=== September ===
- The total of Soviet aircraft destroyed since the German invasion of the Soviet Union began on June 22 reaches 7,500.
- During the month, Soviet Air Force Frontal Aviation aircraft assigned to the Western Front fly 4,101 sorties against German forces building up for a ground offensive against Moscow, dropping 831 tons (754 metric tons) of bombs and claiming 120 enemy aircraft destroyed on the ground and 89 in the air. Aircraft assigned to the neighboring Bryansk and Reserve Fronts report similar levels of activity. The 81st Bomber Air Division of Soviet Long-Range Bomber Aviation strikes staging bases for Luftwaffe raids on Moscow.
- The Grumman Martlet fighter makes its first carrier deployment aboard Royal Navy aircraft carriers on convoy protection duties. It is the first carrier-based combat use of any variant of the Grumman F4F Wildcat.
- September 5–12 – Nine U.S. Army Air Forces Boeing B-17D Flying Fortress bombers fly from Hickam Field in Hawaii to Clark Field in the Philippine Islands via Midway Atoll, Wake Island, Port Moresby in New Guinea, and Darwin, Australia.
- September 12 – Aircraft from the British aircraft carrier HMS Victorious strike Glomfjord, Norway, sinking two merchant ships without loss to themselves.
- September 14 – An escort aircraft carrier deploys for combat for the first time, as the Royal Navy's HMS Audacity puts to sea to escort her first convoy. It is the first time that an aircraft carrier has been committed directly to convoy defense, and the first operations by an aircraft carrier against Axis forces attacking convoys in the Atlantic Ocean since mid-September 1939.
- September 23 – Hans-Ulrich Rudel single-handedly sinks the Soviet battleship Marat flying a Junkers Ju 87 dive bomber.
- September 27 – During Operation Halberd, Italian aircraft attack a Malta-bound convoy and its escorts in the Mediterranean, damaging the British battleship HMS Nelson and fatally damaging a merchant cargo ship.
- September 30 – The Germans begin their ground offensive against Moscow, Operation Typhoon, supported by the Luftwaffe's Luftflotte 2 (2nd Air Fleet), which the Soviets estimate has 950 aircraft. Soviet Air Force units in the area have only 391 aircraft and are quickly overwhelmed.

=== October ===
- Aircraft from the British aircraft carrier HMS Victorious strike Glomfjord, Norway, sinking two merchant ships for the loss of two Fairey Albacores.
- October 1 – Inter-Island Airways is renamed Hawaiian Airlines.
- October 2 – Heini Dittmar sets a new airspeed record of 1,004 km/h (624 mph) in a Messerschmitt Me 163A. The record is unofficial because the flight (and the Me 163 programme) is kept secret, and remains "unbroken" until officially exceeded by the American Douglas Skystreak in August 1947.
- October 6 – During the first week of Operation Typhoon, the Soviet Air Force has flown 700 sorties against German forces driving toward Moscow.
- October 9 – Since October 1, German aircraft supporting Operation Typhoon have flown more than 4,000 sorties against the Soviet Western Front alone.
- October 11–18 – Soviet Air Force aircraft strike Luftwaffe staging airfields along the northwestern, western, and southwestern approaches to Moscow.
- October 11–12 – After Soviet intelligence detects Luftwaffe plans for a major air attack on October 12 targeting industrial complexes, airfields, railroad terminals, and logistical facilities in the Soviet Western Front area, Soviet Air Force aircraft mount a major preemptive strike against German airfields at Vitebsk, Smolensk, Orel, Orsha, Siversk, and elsewhere overnight on October 11–12, followed by another large raid on the morning of October 12. The Soviets claim 500 German aircraft destroyed, although German sources do not confirm that number.
- October 18 – The German drive on Moscow stalls because of mud, and will make little progress until the ground freezes in mid-November. During this period, the Soviet Air Force flies 26,000 sorties in support of forces defending Moscow.
- October 27 – Victor Talalikhin, the Soviet Union's first major air hero of World War II, is killed in action during a dogfight with German aircraft.
- October 28 – As part of the 1941 purge of the Soviet armed forces, 20 officers of the Soviet armed forces are executed. Among those shot are General Yakov Smushkevich, commander of the Soviet Air Forces from 1939 to 1940 who had overseen its poor performance during the Winter War with Finland, General Pavel Rychagov, commander of the Soviet Air Forces from 1940 to 1941, and Rychagov's wife, aviator Maria Nesterenko. Rychagov is executed because he had called Soviet military aircraft "flying coffins" and Nesterenko because she had failed to denounce him as a state criminal.

=== November ===
- Italy begins the conversion of the passenger liner SS Roma into the first Italian aircraft carrier, later named Aquila ("Eagle"). The conversion will halt in an incomplete state when Italy surrenders to the Allies in September 1943 and will never be finished.
- November 7–8 (overnight) – 392 British bombers attack Berlin, Cologne, and Mannheim, losing 36 of their number – a heavy 9.2 percent loss rate.
- November 12 – The British aircraft carrier HMS Ark Royal is sunk in the Mediterranean east of Gibraltar by the German submarine U-81.
- November 15-December 5 – The Luftwaffe carries out 41 raids on Moscow. Soviet air defenses claim an average of 30 to 40 German aircraft shot down per day during the attacks. During the same period, the Soviet Air Force, better prepared for cold-weather operations than the Luftwaffe, reportedly flies 15,840 sorties while Luftwaffe aircraft supporting Operation Typhoon manage only 3,500. Soviet sources claim that the Luftwaffe loses 1,400 aircraft during this time.
- November 17 – Ernst Udet, the Luftwaffe's Director-General of Equipment and the second-highest German ace of World War I (62 victories), commits suicide.
- November 22
  - The German fighter ace Werner Mölders dies in the crash of a Heinkel He 111 bomber at Breslau while riding as a passenger on his way to Ernst Udet's funeral. His official kill total stands at 115 at the time of his death, although he is believed to have shot down another 30 Soviet aircraft for which he received no credit while making unauthorized combat flights during the last months of his career.
  - Malta-based British aircraft attack an Axis convoy bound from Naples to North Africa, damaging the Italian light cruiser Luigi di Savoia Duca degli Abruzzi.
- November 30
  - Mario de Bernardi flies air mail from Milan to Guidonia Montecelio, Italy, in a Caproni Campini N.1 motorjet-powered aircraft. It is the first time air mail is carried in any form of jet aircraft.
  - In the air defense of Moscow, the Soviet Air Defense Forces 6th Fighter Air Corps claims to have shot down 170 German aircraft since November 1. It will claim another 80 kills in December.
- November 30-December 4 – U.S. Navy patrol aircraft based in the Philippine Islands monitor Japanese naval and shipping activity at Camranh Bay in French Indochina.

=== December ===
- December 1 – The Civil Air Patrol is founded in the United States.
- December 2 – Adolf Hitler orders the Luftwaffe's Fliegerkorps II to redeploy from the Soviet Union to Sicily and North Africa and together with Fliegerkorps X to form Luftflotte 2 under the command of Field Marshal Albert Kesselring, and orders Kesselring to achieve air superiority over southern Italy and North Africa, suppress Allied forces on Malta, ensure safe passage of Axis convoys to North Africa, paralyze Allied sea traffic in the Mediterranean, and prevent Allied supplies from arriving at Tobruk and Malta. The redeployment will reverse the balance of power at sea in the Mediterranean in favor of the Axis.
- December 5 – The Soviets begin a major counteroffensive to push German forces back from the Moscow area. In the western sector of the Soviet offensive alone, the Soviets commit 1,376 aircraft to support the offensive, opposing a Soviet-estimated 580 German planes. In the southwestern sector, the 286 available Soviet aircraft make a concerted effort to destroy the 2nd Panzer Army, flying 5,066 combat sorties during the month.
- December 7 (December 8 west of the International Date Line) – The Imperial Japanese Navy makes a devastatingly successful surprise attack on Pearl Harbor and other U.S. military facilities on Oahu, Hawaii. Six aircraft carriers launch 353 warplanes in two waves. They sink five American battleships and ten other vessels, damage three other battleships, and destroy 188 U.S. aircraft, killing 2,402 and wounding 1,282. The Japanese lose 29 aircraft, five midget submarines, and 65 killed.
- December 8
  - Japanese air attacks destroy half the aircraft of the United States Army Air Forces′ Far East Air Force in the Philippine Islands. Japanese aircraft also begin attacks on Hong Kong, Guam, and Wake Island.
  - As the Japanese invasion of Malaya begins, RAF aircraft attack Japanese shipping in the South China Sea off the invasion beach at Kota Bharu in British Malaya, hitting Awajisan Maru, the headquarters ship of Major General Hiroshi Takumi, the commanding officer of the Imperial Japanese Army′s 18th Division′s 56th Regiment, and forcing her abandonment. The landing is successful, however, and captures the airfield at Kota Bahru before the end of the day.
  - During the Japanese invasion of Malaya, Imperial Japanese Army Air Force Lieutenant Yohei Hinoki and his wingman score the first aerial victory by the Nakajima Ki-43 Hayabusa ("peregrine falcon"; Allied reporting name "Oscar") fighter, forcing an RAF No. 34 Squadron Bristol Blenheim Mark IV trying to bomb the Japanese beachhead in British Malaya to land at Machang airfield.
  - The United States declares war on Japan.
  - As a consequence of the attack on Pearl Harbor the Pacific Clipper, then in New Zealand, is ordered to return to the U.S. not via Hawaii but westbound. The flight therefore takes a route via Indonesia, Ceylon, Sudan, the Congo, Brazil to Trinidad before reaching New York on January 6, 1942, after a journey of more than 20,000 miles.
- December 9
  - Japanese aircraft which landed at captured airfields at Patani and Singora, Thailand, the previous day already have destroyed on the ground 60 of the 100 British aircraft based in northern Malaya. By December 12, the Japanese will have complete air superiority over northern Malaya.
  - Soviet air reconnaissance confirms a large-scale German troop withdrawal west of Klin in response to the Soviet winter counteroffensive.
- December 9–14 – With the German air threat to Moscow in decline, Soviet Air Defense Forces fighters of the 6th Fighter Air Corps join Soviet Air Force Frontal Aviation aircraft in supporting the Soviet winter ground offensive, attacking retreating German troops columns west of Moscow near Klin, Solnechnogorsk, and other locations in heavy snow and extreme cold.
- December 10
  - French Indochina-based Imperial Japanese Navy Mitsubishi G3M bombers (Allied reporting name "Nell") sink the Royal Navy battleship Prince of Wales (53) and battlecruiser Repulse (1916) in the South China Sea east of Malaya using torpedoes. They are the first capital ships to be sunk at sea by aircraft alone.
  - In the Philippines, 54 Japanese naval bombers systematically destroy Cavite Navy Yard and a significant part of neighboring Cavite with precision bombing from 20,000 feet (6,100 m) during a two-hour attack. The submarine USS Sealion (SS-195) is sunk pierside at the Navy Yard, the first American submarine ever sunk by enemy action.
  - After a courageous attack against Japanese ships off the Philippines, U.S. Army Air Force Captain Colin Kelly, a B-17C Flying Fortress pilot, becomes one of the earliest American heroes of World War II when he stays at the controls of his stricken bomber long enough for his crew to escape and is killed when his plane explodes. He is mistakenly reported to have deliberately crashed his stricken plane into the Japanese battleship Haruna.
  - A Douglas SBD Dauntless dive bomber from the aircraft carrier USS Enterprise (CV-6) piloted by Lieutenant Clarence E. Dickinson sinks the Japanese submarine I-70 northeast of Oahu. I-70 is the first Japanese submarine ever sunk by enemy forces and the first enemy warship sunk by the U.S. armed forces during World War II.
- December 11
  - The United States exchanges declarations of war with Germany and Italy.
  - Four United States Marine Corps F4F Wildcat fighters on Wake Island play an important role in repelling a Japanese invasion of the island.
  - Serving in the Royal Canadian Air Force's No. 412 Squadron, American poet and aviator John Gillespie Magee, Jr., dies when his Supermarine Spitfire fighter collides with an Airspeed Oxford trainer over Roxholme, Lincolnshire, England. The Oxford pilot also dies.
  - U.S. Navy PBY Catalina flying boats arrive in Natal, Brazil, to begin patrols of the Brazilian coast and the South Atlantic Ocean.
- December 12 – The U.S. Navy creates the Naval Air Transport Service (NATS) to provide emergency deliveries of materiel to front-line forces when delivery by ship would take too long.
- December 14–19 – Japanese naval aircraft from Kwajalein Atoll strike Wake Island repeatedly.
- December 15–16 (overnight) – The Soviet Union makes the first combat parachute assault in its history, dropping 415 men behind German lines near Teryayeva Sloboda in support of an advance by the Soviet 30th Army. Due to poor coordination of operations and a lack of fighter cover, the Soviet paratroopers suffer heavy casualties and narrowly escape annihilation.
- December 17
  - In the Philippine Islands, United States Army Air Forces P-40 Warhawk pilot Lieutenant Colonel Boyd Wagner shoots down his fifth Japanese plane near Vigan, becoming the first American ace of World War II.
  - Imperial Japanese Army Air Force Nakajima Ki-43 Hayabusa ("peregrine falcon"; Allied reporting name "Oscar") fighters, attack a formation of 12 Royal Australian Air Force No. 453 Squadron Brewster Buffalo fighters over Kuala Lumpur, Malaya, shooting down five of them and damaging four. The only Japanese loss is a Ki-43 that crashes after its wing collapses as it pulls out of a dive.
  - Aircraft from HMS Audacity damage the German submarine U-131 so badly that her crew later scuttles her. It is the first time that escort aircraft carrier-based aircraft contribute to the sinking of a submarine.
  - A Yokosuka E14Y floatplane (Allied reporting name "Glen") launched by the Japanese submarine I-7 conducts a post-strike reconnaissance flight over Pearl Harbor. It is the E14Y's combat debut.
- December 17–20 – All surviving B-17 Flying Fortress bombers of the United States Army Air Forces's Far East Air Force are withdrawn from the Philippine Islands to Australia. All other Far Eastern Air Force aircraft are destroyed or captured by the Japanese.
- December 17–26 – Soviet Air Force Frontal Aviation aircraft fly 1,289 combat sorties in support of five Soviet armies driving on Rzhev, claiming 16 German aircraft shot down.
- December 20 – The Nationalist Chinese Air Force's American Volunteer Group, the "Flying Tigers", sees its first combat near Kunming, China.
- December 21
  - The Luftwaffe's Fliegerkorps II begins a steadily escalating bombing and sea mining campaign against Malta with a goal of knocking out British air and naval forces based there.
  - The German submarine U-751 torpedoes and sinks the British escort carrier HMS Audacity while she is escorting a convoy about 430 nautical miles (800 kilometres) west of Cape Finisterre. During her three months of operations, Audacity's aircraft have shot down five Focke-Wulf Fw 200 Condors, damaged three more, and driven one off, contributed to the sinking of a German submarine, and greatly interfered with the operations of German submarines against convoys she had escorted, proving the value of escort carrier escort of convoys. As a result, the Allies will begin to commit escort carriers to convoy escort operations in the Atlantic Ocean again in 1943.
- December 21–22 – Aircraft from the Japanese carriers Hiryū and Sōryū strike Wake Island, which will fall to the Japanese on December 23.
- December 22 – A radar-equipped Fairey Firefly sinks a German submarine (U-451) at night, the first such victory.
- December 27–28 – 132 British bombers attack Düsseldorf, Germany.
- December 31
  - Since October 1, the Soviet Union has formed 71 new air regiments.
  - During 1941, German night fighters defending Germany have shot down 421 British bombers, a tenfold increase over 1940.

== First flights ==
- Aeronca L-3
- Arado Ar 232
- Spring 1941– Nakajima B6N Tenzan ("Heavenly Mountain"), Allied reporting name "Jill"

=== January ===
- Kawanishi H8K (Allied reporting name "Emily")
- Junkers Ju 288
- January 9 – Avro Manchester Mark III BT308, prototype of the Avro Lancaster heavy bomber
- January 11 – Polikarpov I-185
- January 29 – Tupolev Tu-2 (NATO reporting name "Bat")

=== February ===
- Curtiss O-52 Owl
- February 2 – Curtiss XP-46A
- February 18 – Grumman XP-50
- February 19 – Airspeed Cambridge T2449
- February 25 – Messerschmitt Me 321

=== March ===
- Kawasaki Ki-60

=== April ===
- Kyushu K10W1
- April 2 – Heinkel He 280
- April 9 – Piaggio P.111
- April 10 – Nakajima G5N Shinzan ("Mountain Recess"), Allied reporting name ("Liz"); first four-engined land-based aircraft designed for the Imperial Japanese Navy and first aircraft built in Japan with retractable tricycle landing gear

=== May ===
- Kawasaki Ki-45 KAI Toryu ("Dragon Slayer"); Allied reporting name "Nick"
- Kokusai Ki-76 (Allied reporting name "Stella")
- Nakajima J1N Gekko ("Moonlight"), Allied reporting name "Irving"
- May 6 – Republic XP-47B, prototype of the P-47 Thunderbolt
- May 14 – Grumman XP-50
- May 15 – Gloster E.28/39, the first British jet
- May 26 – Kayaba Ka-1, the pioneering combat autogyro design.

=== June ===
- Brewster XSB2A-1, prototype of the Brewster SB2A Buccaneer and Brewster Bermuda
- June 14 – Martin 187, prototype of the Martin Baltimore

=== July ===
- July 19 – Beech Model 26, prototype of the Beechcraft AT-10 Wichita

=== August ===
- August 1 – Grumman TBF Avenger
- August 8 – Spencer Air Car

=== September ===
- Polikarpov TIS
- September 18 – Curtiss XP-60

=== December ===
- Kawasaki Ki-61 Hien ("Swallow"), Allied reporting name "Tony"
- December 5 – Kawanishi E15K Shiun ("Violet Cloud"), Allied reporting name "Norm"
- December 8 – Nakajima A6M2-N (Allied reporting name "Rufe")
- December 22
  - Fairey Firefly prototype Z1826
  - Vought XTBU-1, prototype of the Consolidated TBY Sea Wolf

== Entered service ==
- Nakajima Ki-43 Hayabusa ("peregrine falcon"), Allied reporting name "Oscar", with the 59th and 64th Groups, Imperial Japanese Army Air Force
- Stinson L-1 Vigilant with the United States Army Air Corps
- Early 1941 – Lavochkin-Gorbunov-Gudkov LaGG-3 with the Soviet Air Force
- Autumn 1941 – Nakajima Ki-49 Donryu ("Storm Dragon"), Allied reporting name "Helen", with the Imperial Japanese Army Air Force
- Late 1941 – Aichi E13A (Allied reporting name "Jake") with the Imperial Japanese Navy

=== February ===
- P-39 Airacobra with 31st Pursuit Group (39th, 40th, and 41st Pursuit Squadrons), United States Army Air Corps

=== April ===
- Mitsubishi G4M (Allied reporting name "Betty") with the Imperial Japanese Navy's 1st Naval Air Corps
- April 7 – Douglas Havoc night fighter with No. 85 Squadron, RAF

=== May ===
- Northrop N-3PB with RAF's No. 330 (Norwegian) Squadron

=== July ===
- Mitsubishi Ki-46 (Allied reporting name "Dinah") with Imperial Japanese Army Air Force

=== August ===
- Focke-Wulf Fw 189 with the German Luftwaffe
- Focke-Wulf Fw 190 with the German Luftwaffe
- Nakajima Ki-43 Hayabusa ("peregrine falcon"; Allied reporting name "Oscar") with the Imperial Japanese Army Air Force.

=== September ===
- Bell Airacobra (British export version; U.S. Army Air Forces designation P-400) with No. 601 Squadron, RAF

=== November ===
- de Havilland Mosquito with No. 105 Squadron, RAF

=== December ===
- Avro Lancaster with No. 44 (Rhodesia) Squadron, RAF

== Retirements ==
- Avro 621 Tutor by the RAF
- Detroit ZMC-2 by the United States Navy
- Douglas XT3D by the United States Navy
- Mid-1941
  - Berliner-Joyce OJ-2 by the United States Navy
  - Saro London (from front-line service) by the Royal Air Force and Royal Canadian Air Force

=== May ===
- Handley Page Heyford by the Royal Air Force; the RAF's last biplane heavy bomber
