= Sergei Denisov (aviator) =

Soviet fighter pilot (1909–1971)

Sergey Prokofyevich Denisov
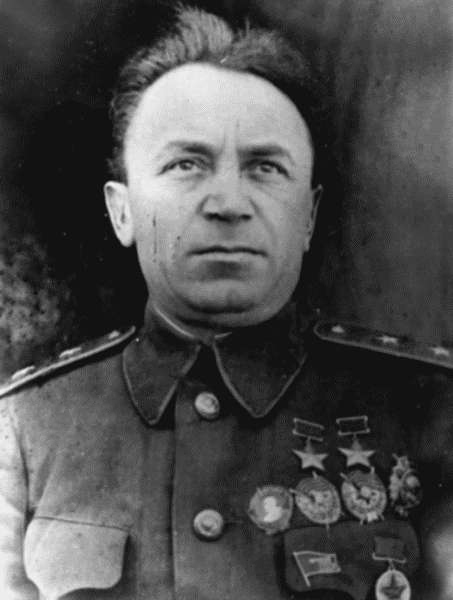
- Native name: Сергей Прокофьевич Денисов
- Born: 12 December [O.S. 25 December] 1909; Rossosh, Russian Empire
- Died: 6 June 1971 (aged 61) Moscow, Soviet Union
- Allegiance: Soviet Union
- Branch: Soviet Air Force
- Service years: 1929 – 1947
- Rank: Lieutenant-General of Aviation
- Commands: Transcaucasian Military District Aviation; 283rd Fighter Aviation Division
- Conflicts: Spanish Civil War; Battles of Khalkhin Gol; World War II; Winter War
- Awards: Hero of the Soviet Union (twice)

Sergey Prokofyevich Denisov (Russian: Серге́й Проко́фьевич Дени́сов; 12 December [O.S. 25 December] 1909 – 6 June 1971) was a Soviet fighter pilot during the Spanish Civil War who went on to hold various high commands during the Battles of Khalkhin Gol, the Soviet-Finnish War, and World War II in addition to being awarded the title Hero of the Soviet Union twice.

== Early life ==
Denisov was born on 7 January [O.S. 25 December 1909] 1910 to a Ukrainian family in Rossosh, Russian Empire. After completing his fourth grade of schooling in 1921 he went on to attend trade school, and in 1926 he completed his third grade of trade school, after which he worked as a mechanic until joining the military in 1929.

== Military career ==
Having entered the military in October 1929, he was based in Gomel until being transferred to the 83rd Training Squadron in Smolensk, which soon became a flight school. There he studied with future twice Hero of the Soviet Union Stepan Suprun before graduating in July 1931; he became a member of the communist party in 1930. He then spent just a few months in the 9th Aviation Squadron before switching to the 33rd Aviation Squadron, where he rose through the ranks to flight commander; there he flew the I-4 and I-5, but when made commander of the 41st Squadron in May 1934 he switched to the I-16.

=== Spanish Civil War ===
Not long after the outbreak of the civil war in Spain between the Republicans and the Nationalists, Denisov volunteered to go to Spain as part of the group of Soviet volunteers assisting the Spanish Republican Air Force. He was deployed in Spain from November 1936 to April 1937, during which he flew on the I-16 fighter and gained multiple aerial victories; his exact tally of aerial victories in Spain is somewhere around 2-3 solo victories and 3-4 shared victories. For his actions in the conflict he was awarded the title Hero of the Soviet Union on 4 July 1937, although his participation in the war was not publicly acknowledged since the Soviet role in the war was classified.

=== Khalkhin Gol ===
Upon returning from Spain he was made commander of the 142nd Fighter Aviation Brigade, which he remained in command of until April 1939. He then began attending command improvement courses at the Military Academy of General Staff. He was then tasked with studying and correcting the reasons for unsatisfactory performance of the 57th Separate Corps in the battles against the Japanese. In late May he arrived in Mongolia, where he was stationed at the headquarters of the 1st Army. When he returned from Mongolia, he spoke with Mikhail Kaganovich, Nikolai Polikarpov, Alexander Yakovlev, and Stalin about the design of Soviet fighters.

=== Winter war ===
Less than a year after returning from Mongolia, Denisov began his role in the Winter War as the commander of the 7th Air Army, which managed to break through the Mannerheim Line. He was awarded the title Hero of the Soviet Union on 21 March 1940 for his command in the war. That year he was promoted to General-lieutenant of Aviation.

=== World War II ===
Shortly before the start of Operation Barbarossa, he was made commander of aviation in the Transcaucasian Military District in April 1940, but was demoted just two days before the start of the invasion due to alcoholism. Many of his colleagues from Spain, Khalkhin Gol and Finland, including Pavel Rychagov, Yakov Smushkevich, and Ivan Proskurov, were arrested on fabricated charges of treason shortly before the German invasion; Denisov survived the purges. After the start of the war he was made head of the Kacha Military Aviation School in August, which had been evacuated to Saratov. When the school was inspected in 1942, major problems were noted, with the final report being critical of Denisov for failure to resolve problems at the school, rarely took charge, and continued to abuse alcohol; on 4 November 1942 he was fired from the school. In February 1943 he was made commander of the 283rd Fighter Aviation Division, which took part in the battles for Kursk, Chernigov, Pripiyat, and Gomel before he was removed from the post in December due to failure to maintain discipline among his unit. After another demotion he was eventually posted to the 4th Tactical Training Division as an assistant chief until October 1946. Having graduated from the Military Academy of General Staff in September 1947, he soon entered the reserve in November.

== Civilian life ==
After leaving the military he began working as the head of a test flight station at an aircraft factory in 1948, and in 1951 he headed the test station at a Mil-Mi factory. He learned to fly the Mi-1 before leaving the institution in 1953. Starting in 1955 he headed a branch of a school for training engineers in Moscow. The school was turned into an independent institution in 1957, but he left it in December 1958. In July 1964 he started work, where he managed a laboratory at the All-Union chamber of commerce. He died on 6 June 1971 and was buried in the Novodevichy cemetery.

== Awards ==
- Twice Hero of the Soviet Union (4 July 1937 and 21 March 1940)
- Order of Lenin (4 July 1937)
- Two Order of the Red Banner (3 January 1937 and 29 August 1939)
- Order of Alexander Nevsky (25 July 1943)
- Order of the Red Banner of Mongolia (10 August 1939)
