= Boris Rodos =

Military officer

Boris Veniaminovich Rodos
- Борис Вениаминович Родос
- Born: 22 June 1905; Melitopol, Russian Empire
- Died: 20 April 1956 (aged 50); Butyrka Prison, Moscow, Russian SFSR, Soviet Union
- Cause of death: Execution by shooting
- Known for: Torturing high-ranking communists arrested in the Great Purges
- Political party: Communist Party of the Soviet Union (1931–1953)
- Awards: (2)

Boris Veniaminovich Rodos (Russian: Борис Вениаминович Родос; 22 June 1905 – 20 April 1956) was an officer of the OGPU, colonel of the NKVD and Ministry of State Security, deputy head of the Investigative Department of the Main Board of State Security and People's Commissariat of State Security who was notorious for torturing prisoners during interrogations. His victims came from a variety of high-ranking communists and military officials who fell victim to purges, including Yakov Smushkevich, Grigory Shtern, and Aleksandr Loktionov.

== Biography ==
Rodos was the son of a Jewish tailor from Melitopol, Russian Empire. Reputedly, he left school at the age of 11, possibly because his education was disrupted by the February Revolution. As an office worker in Melitopol, he joined Komsomol (the Young Communist League) but was expelled in 1930 for attempted rape. He joined the Communist Party of the Soviet Union in 1931 and, around the same time, became an officer of the OGPU in Ukraine.

He was transferred to a minor post in NKVD headquarters in Moscow in May 1937, after the mass arrests of NKVD officers ordered by Nikolai Yezhov. In December 1938, after Yezhov had been dismissed and replaced by Lavrenty Beria, Rodos was promoted to the rank of Lieutenant and appointed Deputy Head of the NKVD Investigation Department.

One of the first prisoners interrogated by Rodos was a fellow officer, Pyotr Zubov, who was arrested for bungling an attempted coup against the King of Yugoslavia. Rodos smashed his knees with a hammer in a failed attempt to force a confession out of him. Zubov was later cleared and returned to work as a foreign agent, but needed a walking stick because of his injuries.

In the spring and summer of 1939, Rodos was in charge of interrogating his former superior, Yezhov, who said at his subsequent trial that during his first interrogation "they beat me up horribly" - but who subsequently did not need to be tortured because he was so terrified that he signed everything he was told to sign. Rodos interrogated and tortured the heads of the Ukrainian communist party and government, Vlas Chubar and Stanislav Kosior, and the former head of the Komsomol Alexander Kosarev, and was part of the team who took over the interrogation and torture of Isaac Babel in September 1939. Kosarev's deputy Valentina Pikina was allegedly raped by Rodos and Lev Shvartzman during an interrogation.

In February 1940, he was assigned to beat a confession out of Robert Eikhe, who had been convicted and sentenced to death, but was protesting his innocence. Rodos gave him a prolonged beating, and gouged out one of his eyes, but could not break him.

In March 1940, after the Soviet invasion of Poland, Rodos was sent to direct the deportation of Poles from Lviv, for which he was promoted in 1941 to the rank of major. In 1941, he interrogated the former People's Commissar for armaments Boris Vannikov, whom he threw on the floor and jumped on, shouting 'Tell all, tell all.' Interrogating General Kirill Meretskov in 1941, he broke one of his ribs; Meretskov survived to give evidence at Rodos's trial in 1956. In 1943 he was promoted to the rank of Colonel.

=== Arrest and execution ===
Rodos was dismissed from the MGB (successor to the NKVD) in 1952, probably because Beria had temporarily lost control of the organisation. He was head of anti-aircraft defence staff in Simferopol until his arrest on October 5, 1953. During his closed trial, at which he was convicted of extracting confessions under torture, he was asked whether he knew what Isaac Babel did for a living. He replied that he had been told that Babel was a writer. Asked whether he had read any of Babel's stories, he replied: "What for?"

In February 1956, Soviet leader Nikita Khrushchev delivered his famous "On the Cult of Personality and Its Consequences" speech to the 20th Communist Party Congress, denouncing crimes committed by the Soviet authorities during the 1930s. Khrushchev included a denunciation of Rodos:

The investigative judge Rodos, who in his time investigated and interrogated Kosior, Chubar and Kosarev, is a vile person, with the brain of a bird, and completely degenerate morally. It was this man who was deciding the fate of prominent Party workers. He also was making judgments concerning the politics in these matters, because, having established their “crime,” he thereby provided materials from which important political implications could be drawn. The question arises whether a man with such an intellect could–by himself–have conducted his investigations in a manner proving the guilt of people such as Kosior and others. No, he could not have done it without proper directives. At the Central Committee Presidium session he told us: “I was told that Kosior and Chubar were people's enemies and for this reason I, as an investigative judge, had to make them confess that they were enemies.” He would do this only through long tortures, which he did, receiving detailed instructions from Beria. We must say that at the Central Committee Presidium session he cynically declared: “I thought that I was executing the orders of the Party.”

Rodos was sentenced to death on February 26, one day after the speech. He wrote a long appeal, claiming that he had been the 'blind instrument' of senior officers such as Beria, that he was being made a scapegoat when he was not the only officer who had beaten prisoners, and pleading to be spared the death penalty "for the sake of my innocent children." He was executed on 20 April 1956.

== Family ==
Rodos had a son, Valery (1942-2020) who was arrested in the 1960s as a political dissident. After his release he was able to study philosophy in Moscow University, and to become a philosophy lecturer at Tomsk University, in Siberia. After the collapse of communism, he emigrated with his wife and two sons to the US, where he published a memoir in 2008 entitled I Am An Executioner's Son.
