= Grabsky =

Grabsky is a surname. Notable people with the surname include:

- Mikhail Grabsky (1923−2007), Soviet Jewish tank commander
- Phil Grabsky (fl. from 1990), British documentary film-maker
- Alex Grabsky (fl. from 2023) Professional Kickboxer
- Michael Grabsky (fl. from 1984) Former British Monopoly Champion
