= 1940–1942 Red Army purges =

Execution of many senior Soviet officers by Stalin

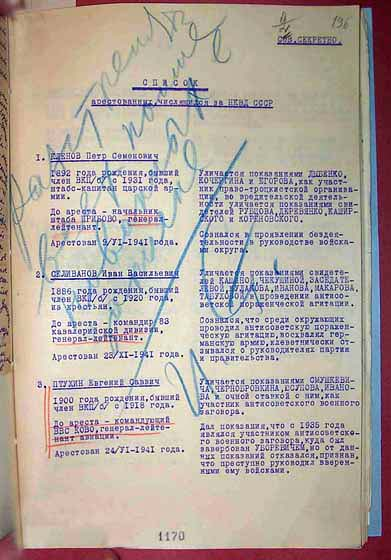
Beria's proposal of 29 January 1942 to execute 46 generals. Stalin's resolution: "Shoot all named in the list. – J. St."

Between October 1940 and February 1942, Joseph Stalin, the leader of the Soviet Union, ordered purges against the Red Army (against the Soviet Air Force in particular) and associated military-related industries. Many of those who were purged were made scapegoats to deflect blame of military losses the Soviets incurred during wartime, with some being forced to falsely admit guilt to crimes, often under torture.

== Background ==
A previous Soviet purge, the Great Purge, ended in 1938. In October 1940 the NKVD (People's Commissariat of Internal Affairs), under its new chief Lavrentiy Beria, started a new purge that initially hit the People's Commissariat of Ammunition, People's Commissariat of Aviation Industry, and People's Commissariat of Armaments. High-level officials admitted guilt, typically under torture, then testified against others. Victims were arrested on fabricated charges of anti-Soviet activity, sabotage, and spying. The wave of arrests in the military-related industries continued well into 1941.

== 1941 purges ==
In April–May 1941, a Politburo inquiry into the high accident rate in the Air Force led to the dismissal of several commanders, including the head of the Air Force, Lieutenant General Pavel Rychagov. In May, a German Junkers Ju 52 landed in Moscow, undetected by the air defense forces beforehand, leading to mass arrests among the Air Force leadership. The NKVD soon focused attention on them and began investigating an alleged anti-Soviet conspiracy of German spies in the military, centered around the Air Force and linked to the conspiracies of 1937–1938. Suspects were transferred in early June from the custody of the Military Counterintelligence to the NKVD. Further arrests continued well after the Axis attack on the Soviet Union started on 22 June 1941.

=== Arrests ===
- May 30: Ivan Sergeyev, People's Commissar of Ammunition, and Major General Ernst Schacht
- May 31: Lieutenant General Pyotr Pumpur
- June 7: Boris Vannikov, People's Commissar of Armaments, and Colonel General Grigory Shtern
- June 8: Lieutenant General Yakov Smushkevich
- June 18: Lieutenant General Pavel Alekseyev
- June 19: Colonel General Alexander Loktionov
- June 24: General Kirill Meretskov and Lieutenant General Pavel Rychagov
- June 27: Lieutenant General Ivan Proskurov

=== During wartime ===
During the first months of the war, scores of commanders, most notably General Dmitry Pavlov, were made scapegoats for failures. Pavlov was arrested and executed after his forces were heavily defeated in the early days of the campaign. Only two of the accused were spared: People's Commissar of Armaments Boris Vannikov (released in July 1941) and Deputy People's Commissar of Defense General Kirill Meretskov (released in September 1941), although the latter had admitted guilt, under torture.

About three hundred commanders, including Lieutenant General Nikolay Klich, Lieutenant General Robert Klyavinsh, and Major General Sergey Chernykh, were executed on 16 October 1941, during the Battle of Moscow. Others were sent to Kuybyshev, provisional capital of the Soviet Union, on 17 October. On 28 October 1941, twenty individuals were summarily shot near Kuybyshev on Lavrentiy Beria's personal order, including Colonel Generals Alexander Loktionov and Grigory Shtern, Lieutenant Generals Fyodor Arzhenukhin, Ivan Proskurov, Yakov Smushkevich, and Pavel Rychagov with his wife, as well as several individuals who had been previously arrested during the immediate aftermath of the Great Purge in 1939, prior to the Red Army Purge of 1941, including politicians Filipp Goloshchyokin and Mikhail Kedrov.

In November 1941, Beria successfully lobbied Stalin to simplify the procedure for carrying out death sentences issued by local military courts so that they would no longer require approval of the Military Collegium of the Supreme Court and Politburo, for the first time since the end of the Great Purge. The right to issue extrajudicial death sentences was granted to the Special Council of the NKVD.

On 29 January 1942, 46 people, including 17 generals, among them Lieutenant Generals Pyotr Pumpur, Pavel Alekseyev, Konstantin Gusev, Yevgeny Ptukhin, Nikolai Trubetskoy, Pyotr Klyonov, Ivan Selivanov, Major General Ernst Schacht, and People's Commissar of Ammunition Ivan Sergeyev, were sentenced to death by the Special Council. After the explicit approval of Stalin, they were executed on the Day of the Red Army, 23 February 1942.

== Aftermath ==
On 4 February 1942, Beria and his ally Georgy Malenkov, both members of the State Defense Committee, were assigned to supervise production of aircraft, armaments, and ammunition.

Many victims were exonerated posthumously during de-Stalinization in the 1950s–1960s. In December 1953, a special secret session of the Supreme Court of the Soviet Union, itself without due process, found Beria guilty of terrorism for the extrajudicial executions that took place in October 1941 and other crimes, and was sentenced to death.

== See also ==
- Case of the Trotskyist Anti-Soviet Military Organization (Tukhachevsky trial)
- Aviators Affair of 1946
