= Pavel Rychagov =

Soviet Air Forces lieutenant general (1911–1941)

Pavel Vasilievich Rychagov
- Павел Васильевич Рычагов
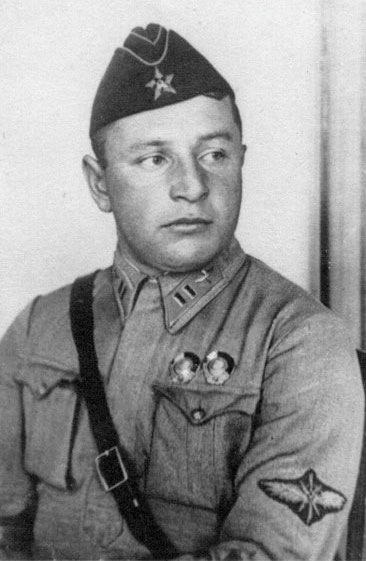
- Born: 15 January [O.S. 2 January] 1911; Moscow, Russian Empire
- Died: 28 October 1941 (aged 30); Samara, Soviet Union
- Spouse: Mariya Nesterenko
- Military career
- Allegiance: Soviet Union
- Branch: Soviet Air Force
- Service years: 1928–1941
- Rank: General-Lieutenant of Aviation
- Conflicts: Spanish Civil War; Second Sino-Japanese War; World War II; Winter War
- Awards: Hero of the Soviet Union

Pavel Vasilievich Rychagov (Russian: Павел Васильевич Рычагов; 2 January 1911 – 28 October 1941) was the Commander of the Soviet Air Forces (VVS) for a brief time from 28 August 1940 to 14 April 1941. He was removed from that position shortly before Operation Barbarossa and the outbreak of the Great Patriotic War, and was executed in a purge of the Red Army several months later.

== Early life and education ==
Rychagov was born on 2 January 1911 in the village of Nizhnie Likhobory, which forms part of present-day Moscow. In 1928, he joined the Red Army, trained at the Leningrad Military College of the Air Forces, from which he graduated in 1930. In 1931, he enrolled for further training at the 2nd Military College for Pilots.

== Military career ==
=== Fighter pilot ===
For five years, Rychagov was an ordinary fighter pilot, building up skills before becoming commander of an aviation squadron in Kiev Military District. In 1936, he was awarded the Order of Lenin for exemplary service; he was also amongst the first Soviet volunteers to fight in the Spanish Civil War.

The most intense part of Rychagov's career as a fighter pilot came in the Spanish Civil War. On 28 October 1936, Rychagov, leading a group of 15 Soviet pilots flying 25 Polikarpov I-15 aircraft, landed in Cartagena, Spain. A few days later, a further group of 10 pilots and 15 aircraft arrived in Bilbao. Rychagov's fighter group saw their first action on 4 November. On that day, they shot down two Junkers Ju 52s and two Fiat CR.32s over Madrid, while no losses were reported among the Soviet pilots. During the next two days, Rychagov's pilots claimed 12 more victories, at the cost of two aircraft lost.

However, on 16 November, Rychagov was shot down over Madrid by Fiat CR.32s, and four days later the number of combat-ready Soviet aircraft in the area had dropped to 15. Seven had been lost in combat, two had been forced to land, and one was undergoing repair. Rychagov, however, stayed on to fight into the spring of 1937. In December 1936 and January 1937 two more shipments of 30 Polikarpovs I-15s arrived in Spain, allowing the formation of a complete combat unit of four I-15 squadrons. By the end of the war, Rychagov's fighter group claimed 40 victories overall.

He returned to the Soviet Union in 1937 for a short time, where he was promoted to Brigadier General at the young age of 26. In 1938, he led another group of volunteers to China, where he participated in several skirmishes with the Japanese.

=== Commander ===
In December 1939, he was promoted to the rank of Major General; he was also appointed Commander of the 9th Air Force Army. He directed operations in the Winter War against Finland.

In May 1940, a third Order of the Red Banner was presented to Rychagov. He was promoted to Lieutenant General several months later.

By 1940, Rychagov was a member of the top administration of the Air Force. He was appointed Head of Red Army Air Force Administration and became a member of the Red Army Chief Military Council, a predecessor of the Stavka. Eventually, he was appointed Commander of the Air Force on 28 August 1940, succeeding Yakov Smushkevich.

== Death ==
Shortly before Operation Barbarossa, Rychagov was removed from the position of Commander of the Air Force as part of the purge of the Red Army in 1941, to be replaced by Pavel Zhigarev. This was the result of a Politburo inquiry into the high accident rate in the Air Force. Furthermore, in May 1941, a German Junkers Ju 52 landed in Moscow, undetected by the air defense forces beforehand, leading to massive arrests among the Air Force leadership. In the case of Rychagov specifically, he was punished for referring to Soviet planes as "flying coffins".

On 24 June, two days after the German invasion began, Rychagov was arrested. Some other high-profile arrests made by the NKVD in 1941 included:

- 30 May: People's Commissar of Ammunition Ivan Sergeyev and Major General Ernst Schacht
- 31 May: Lieutenant General Pyotr Pumpur
- 7 June: People's Commissar of Armaments Boris Vannikov and Colonel General Grigory Shtern
- 8 June: Lieutenant General Yakov Smushkevich
- 18 June: Lieutenant General Pavel Alekseyev
- 19 June: Colonel General Alexander Loktionov
- 24 June: General Kirill Meretskov
- 27 June: Lieutenant General Ivan Proskurov

Rychagov was tortured and executed on 28 October 1941 along with his wife, air force Major Mariya Nesterenko. Others who were executed that day included 20 other Soviet officers (including Rychagov's predecessors in the Air Force, Yakov Smushkevich and Aleksandr Loktionov), Rychagov was exonerated posthumously in 1954.

Military offices
Preceded by Yakov Smushkevich	Soviet Air Force (VVS) Commander; 1940–1941	Succeeded by Pavel Zhigarev
