= Yevgeny Ptukhin =

Soviet Air Forces lieutenant general (1902–1942)

Yevgeny Savvich Ptukhin
- Native name: Евгений Саввич Птухин
- Nickname: General José
- Born: 3 March 1902; Yalta, Taurida Governorate, Russian Empire
- Died: 23 February 1942 (aged 39) location unknown
- Allegiance: Soviet Union
- Branch: Soviet Air Forces
- Service years: 1918 – 1941
- Rank: General-Lieutenant of Aviation
- Conflicts: Russian Civil War; Spanish Civil War; World War II; Winter War
- Awards: Hero of the Soviet Union

Yevgeny Savvich Ptukhin (Russian: Евгений Саввич Птухин; 3 March 1902 – 23 February 1942) was a Soviet Air Force officer who held a variety of commands during the Russian Civil War, the Spanish Civil War, and the Winter War before his downfall shortly after the German invasion of the Soviet Union. Arrested along with many other veterans of the Spanish Civil War on fabricated charges of being in an anti-Soviet conspiracy, he was eventually declared guilty of treason and shot without trial on orders of Lavrenty Beria in February 1942. He was posthumously rehabilitated in 1954.

== Early life ==
Ptukhin was born on 3 March 1902 to a Russian family in Yalta; at the time his father was a postal worker, but the family moved to Moscow in 1905 after he got a job as manager of a horse stable. While growing up in Moscow, Yevgeny gained some primary education before signing up for a technical school in Rozhdestvenka. However, he had to abandon his schooling in 1914 after his father's health deteriorated and his brother was drafted into the army, forcing him to begin working to take care of his family. He held a variety of jobs, including working as a porter for train stations, a newspaper deliveryman, and telephone operator, before he enlisted in the Red Army to pursue an aviation career. Initially rejected by the Red Army for being too young, he lied about his age, claiming to be two years older, to get accepted upon re-applying.

== Military career ==
Initially Ptukhin worked as a mechanic in the 3rd Moscow Air Group, where he met and became friends with another future aviation general, Pyotr Pumpur. Not long after joining the Communist Party in 1918 he was deployed to combat zones of the Russian Civil War, where he repaired aircraft belonging to the 1st Aviation Artillery Squadron. After combat on the Polish front he continued to pursue attempts to gain admittance to pilot school, but he failed mathematics portion of entrance exams due to his minimal education. Not giving up on his dream of becoming a pilot, he began studying intensely in order to reach flight school. After relentlessly pursuing an aviation career by studying and working as a mechanic, he eventually was able to attend the Lipetsk flight school starting in December 1923. Shortly before the school was disbanded and all the cadets transferred to Borisoglebsk, he made his first flight on 4 April 1924, piloting an N-14. Soon Ptukhin graduated from the Borisoglebsk flight school among the group of the top 20 students and was sent to Serpukhov for further training before assignment to his squadron in late 1924; his old friend, Pyotr Pumpur, was assigned to the same squadron and the two were glad to reunite. In July 1925, the squadron was ordered to participate in the suppression of a Menshevik revolt; tasked with flying reconnaissance and firing missions, one pilot from the squadron (Senko) was shot down by the revolting Mensheviks on 11 July, but managed to run away from his plane before the rioters arrived. Just days earlier on 3 July the squadron had been named in honor of Feliks Derzhinsky, but in December 1926 it was redesignated as the 7th Separate Aviation Squadron and placed under the command of Aleksey Shirinkin. Ptukhin quickly rose through the ranks, being promoted to flight commander in 1926 and then to squadron commander in 1927. His command later decided to send him to the Air Force Academy for further training, and in 1929 he graduated from the advanced training courses for command personnel before being charged with command of the 15th Separate Fighter Aviation Squadron.

After being appointed as commander and political commissar of the 450th Mixed Aviation Brigade in May 1934 he learned to pilot the R-5 to fly with the bombers in his unit, but he was more interested in fighter aircraft. After the brigade received the I-5 he intensified his flight training efforts, resulting in the brigade being noted for having a high proportion of flight hours and low number of accidents later than year.

In July 1935 he was placed in command of the 142nd Aviation Brigade, and in November that year he was given the rank of kombrig. His brigade's activities intensified from 1935 to 1936 when the Belorussian Military District was scheduled to be checked for combat readiness by Voroshilov. Ptukhin put his brigade through intense training, having R-5 bombers fly with practice targets for the I-16 fighters to practice firing accuracy. Having demonstrated combat readiness, he attended a meeting with several other unit commanders, where he got into an argument with the commander of the 4th cavalry division about how and when aviation should be used in combat.

On 15 May 1937 Ptukhin was assigned to join the group of Soviet military advisors to the Republican forces in the Spanish Civil War. Working under the pseudonym General José, Ptukhin fighters flying for the Spanish Republican Air Force. After a night bombing in July left him with a shrapnel wound in the leg he refused to go to the hospital and insisted on continuing military duties. Despite the Soviet I-15 and I-16 fighters they were equipped with having a disadvantage against the newer German-made fighters that the nationalists used, the aviation group under Ptukhin's command still managed to gain some aerial victories in Spain, resulting in him being the Order of Lenin on 22 December. Not long after returning to the Soviet Union he was promoted to the rank komkor on 22 February 1938.

As a newly promoted komkor, Ptukhin was made commander of the air force of the Leningrad Military District. In that capacity he spend a lot of time in the I-16 fighter, instructing pilots how to fly it in addition to piloting the plane in the May Day parade. However, he was soon recalled to attend training for commanders at the Academy of General Staff in Moscow. Upon graduating in February 1939 he returned to his previous post. Before the start of the Winter War he had a conversation with Stalin about using airfields in Estonia in the event of a conflict with Finland. Immediately after the start of the war with Finland Stalin issued orders down the chain of command for the construction of an airbase on Dago Island, which was completely forested. Word eventually reached Ptukhin, and before the end of the year the airfield was constructed. In January 1940 he was made commander of the newly formed air force Northwestern Front, which consisted of various bomber, fighter, and reconnaissance aviation units. The over 500 aircraft under his command participated heavily in the attack on the Mannerheim Line of the Karelian isthmus, which often involved pilots making multiple sorties per day. Shortly after the end of the conflict he was awarded the title Hero of the Soviet Union on 21 March 1940, and on 4 June 1940 he was promoted to the rank of general-lieutenant.

On 28 January 1941 Ptukhin was promoted to head of the Main Directorate of Air Defense, but due to the stresses of the job he switched to commander of the Air Force of the Kiev Military District in the spring. In that position he became concerned about the frequency of German aircraft entering Soviet airspace on reconnaissance flights and expressed a strong desire to shoot them down. Gravely concerned about the military threat posed by a potential German invasion, he ordered ground camouflage to be used on airfields and shelters to be constructed to protect aircraft in the event of enemy bombardments, but not all the shelters were completed in time to prevent aviation in the district from being decimated in Operation Barbarossa.

== Downfall ==
Ptukhin was removed from his post and arrested in late June 1941 after the airfields under his command sustained heavy losses in the wake of Operation Barbarossa. He was sent to Butyrskaya prison several days later and charged with participation in an anti-Soviet conspiracy based on the coerced testimonies of other high-ranking military officials arrested on orders of Beria in the purge of the Red Army and Air Force, including Yakov Smushkevich, Sergey Chernobrovkin, and Pavel Yusupov. Forced testimonies from other people arrested alleged that Ptukhin was active in an anti-Soviet conspiracy since 1935 and recruited by Ieronim Uborevich. After he was shot on orders of Beria on 23 February 1942 and buried in an unknown location, he was officially stripped of his military awards by decree of the presidium of the Supreme Soviet on 15 May 1943. Over a decade later he was posthumously rehabilitated on 6 October 1954 due to the lack of corpus delicti and on 22 May 1965 his military awards were restored.

== Awards ==
- Hero of the Soviet Union (21 March 1940)
- Two Order of Lenin (22 October 1937 and 21 March 1940)
- Order of the Red Banner (8 March 1938)
- Order of the Red Star (25 May 1936)
