= Semyon Bychkov =

Semyon Bychkov may refer to:

- Semyon Bychkov (conductor) (born 1952), Russian-American conductor
- Semyon Bychkov (pilot) (1918–1946), Soviet pilot
