= Grigory Shtern =

Soviet colonel general (1900–1941)

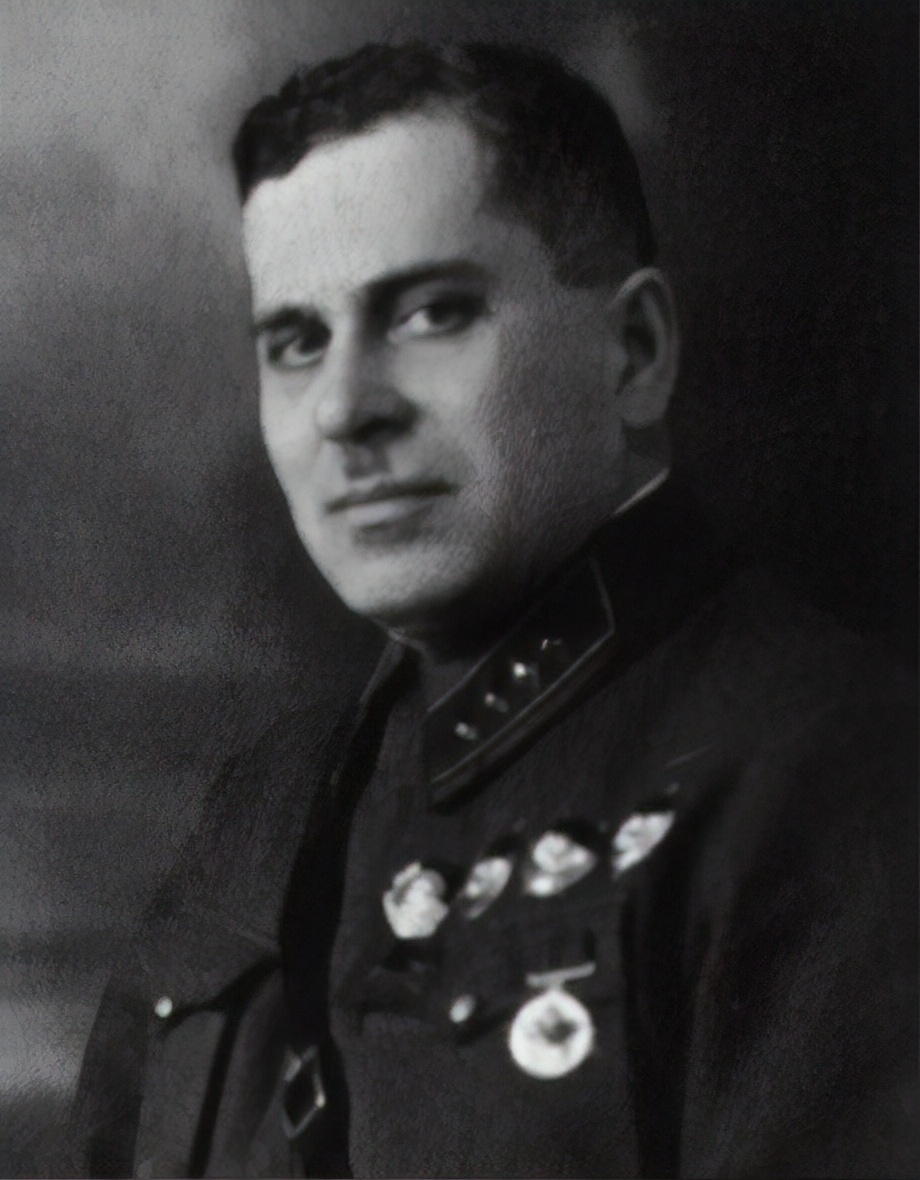
- Born: 6 August [O.S. 24 July] 1900; Smila, Kiev Governorate, Russian Empire (today part of Ukraine)
- Died: 28 October 1941 (aged 41); Kuibyshev, Russian SFSR, Soviet Union
- Military career
- Allegiance: Soviet Union
- Branch: Red Army
- Service years: 1919–1941
- Rank: Colonel General
- Commands: 1st Red Banner Army; Far Eastern Front; 8th Army
- Conflicts: Russian Civil War; Spanish Civil War; Soviet–Japanese Border Wars; Battle of Lake Khasan; Battle of Khalkhin Gol; World War II; Winter War
- Awards: Hero of the Soviet Union

Grigory Mikhailovich Shtern (Russian: Григо́рий Миха́йлович Штерн; 6 August [O.S. 24 July] 1900 – 28 October 1941) was a Soviet officer in the Red Army and military advisor during the Spanish Civil War. He also served with distinction during the Soviet-Japanese Border Wars and the Winter War. The Soviet authorities accused him of treason and had him shot during Stalin's military purge of 1941.

== Career ==
Shtern was born into a Jewish family in Smila, Kiev Governorate (present-day part of Ukraine) in 1900. He started his military career as a Commissar of a Red Army brigade in 1919, the same year he joined the Communist Party. Shtern graduated from the Military Academy of the Red Army in 1929 and worked for the People's Commissariat for Military Affairs. He was appointed commander of the 7th Cavalry Division in 1936. Shtern served as a Soviet military advisor to the Spanish Republican Army during the Spanish Civil War between January 1937 to April 1938.

After returning from Spain, Shtern became chief of staff of the Far Eastern Front, commanded by Vasily Blyukher, who would soon be executed in the Great Purge. During the July and August 1938 Battle of Lake Khasan, Shtern was given command of operations after Blyukher's initial counterattack failed. He attacked the Japanese troops on the disputed ridge with numerically superior forces and slowly pushed them back. The pressure of the Soviet attack forced the Japanese to a cease-fire on 11 August as they could not hold the ridge without widening the conflict. On 31 August Stalin decided to abolish the Far Eastern Front as he felt it had not "proved its worth", and Shtern was given command of the new 1st Red Banner Army. On 9 February 1939 he was promoted to Komandarm 2nd rank.

After a series of border incidents in the spring and early summer of 1939 escalated into the Battles of Khalkhin Gol, Shtern was given command on 5 July of a "front group", which coordinated all Soviet forces in the Far East. The front group oversaw future World War II commander Georgy Zhukov's 57th Special Rifle Corps, fighting at Khalkhin Gol, but on 19 July the corps was converted into the 1st Soviet Mongolian Army Group and given operational independence from Shtern's command, in order that Zhukov could act without interference from Shtern and on direct orders from the General Staff. According to British military historian Geoffrey Roberts, Shtern played a central role in planning the Soviet counterattack in August, but Zhukov was its chief organizer and executor. Shtern was awarded the title Hero of the Soviet Union on 29 August 1939, for his "courage and bravery in the performance of military duties" at Khalkhin Gol.

During the Winter War between Finland and the Soviet Union, Shtern became commander of the 8th Army on 12 December 1939. After the Winter War, the Red Army restored traditional military ranks, and Shtern was promoted to Colonel General on 5 June 1940. He was appointed commander of the Far Eastern Front on 22 June 1940.

Shtern was arrested on 7 June 1941 during a new purge of the Red Army. After being struck by the notorious torturer Lev Shvartzman with an electric cable with such force that it severed his right eye, he "confessed" that he had belonged to a Trotskyist conspiracy within the Red Army from 1931, and that he was a German spy. He was shot without trial on 28 October. Shtern was posthumously rehabilitated in August 1954.

== Awards and honors ==
=== Soviet Union ===
- Hero of the Soviet Union (29 August 1939)
- Order of Lenin, twice (21 June 1937, 29 August 1939)
- Order of the Red Banner, three times (4 September 1924, 22 October 1937, and 25 October 1938)
- Order of the Red Star (19 May 1940)
- Jubilee Medal "XX Years of the Workers' and Peasants' Red Army" (1938)

=== Foreign awards ===
Mongolia

- Order of the Red Banner of Mongolia (10 August 1939)

== See also ==
- Yakov Smushkevich
- Pavel Rychagov
- Aleksandr Loktionov
