= Aviators Affair =

1946 Soviet purge

The Aviators Affair was a 1946 purge of the Soviet air force and the Soviet aircraft industry following accusations that, during World War II, Soviet fighter planes had been of poor quality. It resulted in the arrests and sentencing of about fifteen Soviet senior officers and officials, and was one of the series of similar purges of Soviet military in the aftermath of World War II through which Stalin reaffirmed his control over the country, eliminating or weakening internal rivals.

== Background ==
The complaint about Soviet fighter planes being of lower quality than Western ones (including by Stalin's son Vasily Stalin) might have some grounds in reality. However, one of the primary goals of that affair was Joseph Stalin's desire to find compromising materials to use against Marshal Georgy Zhukov. This was part of Stalin's reaffirming his power in the aftermath of World War II and eliminating or weakening individuals who gained power during that period (mainly prominent leaders of the arms industry and military commanders).

== Victims ==
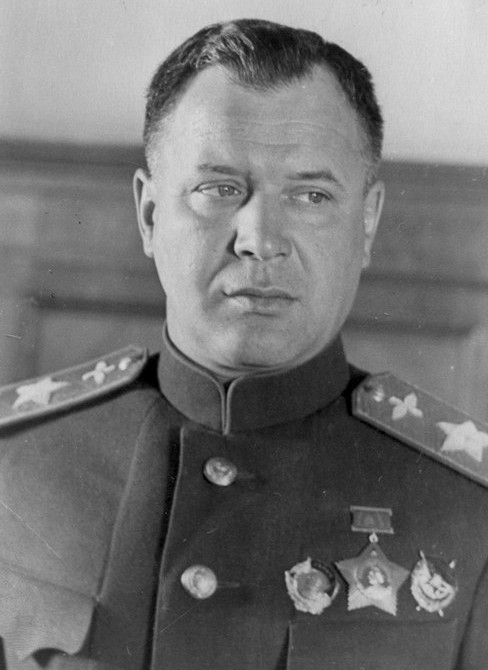
Alexander Novikov, one of the victims of the Aviators Affair (sentenced to fifteen years in a labour camp).

While Zhukov himself would survive this incident with a demotion, the People's Commissar of the Aviation Industry (Minister of Aviation Industry) Aleksey Shakhurin, the Commander of the Air Force and chief marshal of aviation Alexander Novikov, the Chief Engineer of the Air Force Alexander Repin and a number (estimated as fifteen) of other generals and senior officers and officials were arrested, tortured and convicted; with many receiving death sentences (often commuted to imprisonment in Gulags). Air marshal Sergei Khudyakov (arrested already in late 1945) was executed in 1950. One of the most notable Soviet officials who had lost power as a result of this event was Georgy Malenkov; on the other hand, it has temporarily strengthened the power of Andrei Zhdanov.

Notable military victims of related purges of Soviet military included generals Grigory Kulik (arrested in 1946 and executed in 1950) and Vasily Gordov (arrested in 1947 and also executed in 1950). There was also, in the same year (1946), the Admirals Affair, targeting high-ranked officials of the Soviet Navy (such as Nikolai Kuznetsov). Similar events continued for several years (ex. the Artillery's Officer Affair of the early 1950s).

== Aftermath ==
The event has been described as temporarily decapitating the Soviet air force.

The investigation was led, on orders from Stalin, by Viktor Abakumov of the Ministry of State Security, who himself would be purged in the early 1950s, accused, among others, of misconduct during the Aviators Affair. Many victims of the Aviators Affair were rehabilitated during the De-Stalinization period of the 1950s.

In subsequent historiography, the event has been described as a purge, and the case, as fabricated.

== See also ==
- 1941 Red Army Purge
- Case of the Trotskyist Anti-Soviet Military Organization
- Doctors' plot
- Leningrad affair
- Shakhty Trial
