= Nina Rusakova =

Soviet Pilot

Nina Ivanovna Rusakova
- Нина Ивановна Русакова
- Born: 25 January [O.S. 12 January] 1915; Saguny, Voronezh Region, Russian Empire
- Died: 12 November 1997 (aged 82); Shchyolkovo, Moscow Oblast, Russian Federation
- Military career
- Allegiance: Soviet Union
- Branch: Soviet Air Force
- Service years: 1934 – 1961
- Rank: Colonel
- Conflicts: World War II
- Awards: Order of the Red Banner; Merited Test Pilot of the USSR

Nina Ivanovna Rusakova (Russian: Нина Ивановна Русакова; 25 January [O.S. 12 January] 1915 – 12 November 1997) was one of the first female test pilots and the only woman awarded the title Honoured Test Pilot of the USSR.

== Early life ==
Rusakova was born on 25 January [O.S. 12 January] 1915 in the village of Saguny in Voronezh Region, then part of the Russian Empire. In 1933 she graduated from the Voronezh Aeroclub, and in January 1934 she graduated from the Voronezh Aviation Technical School, after which she immediately entered the military. That same year she graduated from the Orenburg Military Aviation School of Pilots before being deployed to Zhytomyr, where she flew I-5, DI-6 and I-16 fighters.

== Military career ==
In July 1940 Rusakova flew as navigator in a flight crew composed of pilot-in-command Mariya Nesterenko and co-pilot Mariya Mikhaileva that attempted to break the distance world record for a straight-line women's flight, which had been previously established by Valentina Grizodubova, Polina Osipenko, and Marina Raskova in 1938. The flight took off in Khabarovsk and was supposed to reach Mazyr, but due to a strong headwind combined with a thunderstorm and icing, the flight was forced to make an emergency landing in a field near the village of Isakovo in the Sanchursky District. The team flew nonstop for 22 hours and 32 minutes, but the attempt gained less publicity and was quickly forgotten.

In 1940 Rusakova began her career as a test pilot at the State Red Banner Air Force Research Institute. During the Second World War she trained new pilots on Yakovlev and Lavochkin aircraft as well as the notoriously difficult and unforgiving Petlyakov Pe-2 in addition to testing various aircraft, including fighters, gliders, bombers, and reconnaissance planes. She reached the rank of colonel in 1955 and in 1959 she was awarded an honorary title "Merited Test Pilot of the USSR". Throughout her career she conducted test flights on various Soviet-made aircraft including the DB-3, Li-2, Il-2, Il-10, Il-12, Il-14, La-7, MiG-3, Pe-2, SB, Tu-2, Tu-4, Yak-3, and Yak-7.

== Later life ==
Rusakova retired with the rank of Colonel in 1961. She lived in the settlement of Chkalovsky in the Moscow Oblast until her death on 12 November 1997.
