= Aleksey Shakhurin =

Soviet bureaucrat, Red Army Air Force colonel general (1904–1975)

- Native name: Алексе́й Ива́нович Шаху́рин
- Born: 25 February 1904; Mikhailovskoye, Russian Empire
- Died: 3 July 1975 (aged 71) Moscow, Russian SFSR, Soviet Union
- Buried: Novodevichy Cemetery
- Allegiance: Soviet Union
- Branch: Red Army Air Force
- Rank: Colonel general
- Awards: Hero of Socialist Labour
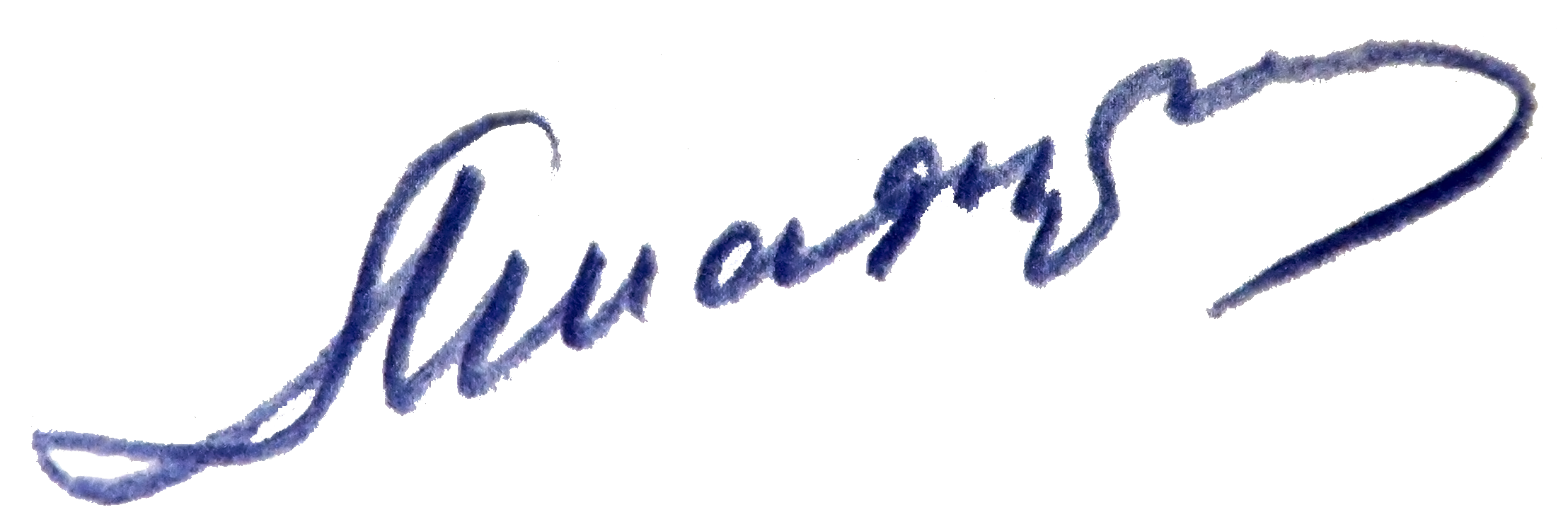
- Signature

Aleksey Ivanovich Shakhurin (Russian: Алексе́й Ива́нович Шаху́рин; 25 February [O.S. 12 February] 1904 – 3 July 1975) was a Soviet bureaucrat who was Minister of Aviation Industry during World War II.

== Biography ==
Aleksey Shakhurin became a member of the Communist Party of the Soviet Union in 1925. He was a delegate to the 18th Congress of the Communist Party in 1939 and was elected a member of the party's Central Committee.

He became Minister of Aviation Industry between 1940 and 1946, and played an important role in the reorganisation of the Soviet Air Force during World War II. The experience of the Spanish Civil War and the Winter War against Finland had shown that the Soviet Union's flight material was out of date compared to foreign designs. Since the beginning of 1939, intensive work has therefore been carried out to develop new, more modern types of aircraft, new design offices were opened and new plants were built. His Deputy Minister was Alexander Sergeyevich Yakovlev. Thanks to these measures, the Soviet Union had already begun testing and introducing new models when Germany launched Operation Barbarossa in 1941.

Production of types such as the Yak-1 and MiG-3 fighter and the Il-2 attack aircraft had started just a few months before the start of the fighting and only a few specimens had been put into service, but the industry was able to increase dramatically its output during the course of the war, so that the material superiority of aircraft over the German opponent was secured. Shakhurin was also responsible for evacuating the aircraft industry in the west of the Soviet Union and its suppliers to the east of the Soviet Union.

In 1946, in what became known as the Aviators Affair, Shakhurin was dismissed from his post on charges that inferior aircraft had been produced during his term and was sentenced to seven years in prison. After Stalin's death in 1953, he was rehabilitated from all charges in 1953 and reinstated as Deputy Minister for the Aviation Industry in August of the same year. Later, he was vice-chairman of the State Committee on Foreign Economic Relations of the Council of Ministers of the USSR.

He retired in 1959. He was awarded, amongst others, the title of Soviet Hero of Socialist Labour.

== Sources ==
- Soviet Encyclopedia, 3rd Edition, ed. A. M. Prokhorov 1978, Publishing House Soviet Encyclopedia
- Global Security
- Alexei Iwanowitsch Schachurin (1989) [1985 Moscow], Flügel des Sieges [Крылья победы] (in Russian), translated by Horst Wendt, Berlin: Militärverlag der DDR, ISBN 3-327-00822-1
