= Chinese Air Force (disambiguation) =

Chinese Air Force may refer to:

- People's Republic of China (PRC) Air Force
  - People's Liberation Army Air Force: the air force of the People's Republic of China
  - People's Liberation Army Navy Air Force: the air component of the navy
  - People's Liberation Army Ground Force Aviation: the air component of the ground force
- Republic of China (ROC) Air Force:
  - Republic of China Air Force: the air force of the Republic of China established on the mainland in 1920, operating in the Taiwan Area since 1949 after its retreat
  - Republic of China Navy air component: Republic of China Naval Aviation Command
  - Republic of China Army air component
- China Air Task Force: An interim unit formed mainly from the Flying Tigers after their disbandment on July 4, 1942 and before their reunion, in part, within the 14th Air Force in 1943.
