= Mariya Nesterenko =

Soviet military aviator (1910–1941)

- Born: Mariya Petrivna Nesterenko; August 1910; Budy, Russian Empire (presently located within the Kharkiv Oblast of Ukraine)
- Died: 28 October 1941 (aged 31) Kuibyshev, Russian SFSR, USSR
- Allegiance: Soviet Union
- Branch: Soviet Air Force
- Service years: 1933–1941
- Rank: Major
- Awards: Order of the Red Star; Order of the Red Banner of Labour
- Spouse: Pavel Rychagov
- Other work: CPSU (1931–1941)

Mariya Petrivna Nesterenko (Ukrainian: Марія Петрівна Нестеренко; 1910 – 28 October 1941) was a Soviet pilot who rose to the rank of major in the Air Force and became a deputy regimental commander before she was executed for being the wife of Hero of the Soviet Union Pavel Rychagov, a victim of one of NKVD chief Lavrentiy Beria's purges of the air force. She, her husband, and the other victims were posthumously rehabilitated after Stalin died.

== Early life ==
Nesterenko was born sometime during August 1910 to a Ukrainian family in the village of Budy, then part of the Russian Empire. After completing her initial education she worked at a pottery factory while she dreamed of aviation in addition to having hobbies in music and sports.

== Aviation career ==
Having become a member of the Communist Party in 1931, she graduated from the Kharkov Aviation School before entering the Kacha Military Aviation School of Pilots, which she graduated from in 1933.

In July 1940 she flew as pilot-in-command with co-pilot Mariya Mikhaileva and navigator Nina Rusakova in an attempt to break the distance world record for a straight-line women's flight, which had been previously established by Valentina Grizodubova, Polina Osipenko, and Marina Raskova in 1938. The flight took off in Khabarovsk and was supposed to reach Mazyr, but due to a strong headwind combined with a thunderstorm and icing, the flight was forced to make an emergency landing in a field near the village of Isakovo in the Sanchursky District. The team flew nonstop for 22 hours and 32 minutes, but the attempt gained less publicity and was quickly forgotten. In October that year she was appointed as deputy commander of a special purpose-aviation regiment.

== Downfall ==
Shortly after the German invasion of the Soviet Union, Nesterenko was arrested at an aerodrome on 26 June 1941 and executed along with dozens of other high-ranking officers on 28 October 1941. Officially, she was shot for failure to report a crime, with Beria alleging that as wife of General Rychagov she would have to have been aware of his "traitorous activities"; it was later revealed that the entire case against Rychagov and his colleagues was fabricated by Beria, who had himself ordered that they be shot without trial. Rychagov had gotten in trouble for referring to Soviet aircraft as "flying coffins" directly to Stalin.
