= Aleksandr Loktionov =

Soviet colonel general (1893–1941)

- Александр Дмитриевич Локтионов
- Loktionov in 1938
- Born: 23 August [O.S. 11 August] 1893; Verkhny Lyubazh, Kursk Governorate, Russian Empire
- Died: 28 October 1941 (aged 48); Samara, USSR
- Military career
- Allegiance: (Russian Empire) 1914–1917 (Soviet Union) 1918–1941
- Rank: Colonel-general
- Conflicts: World War I Russian Civil War
- Awards: Order of the Red Banner (2)

Aleksandr Dmitriyevich Loktionov (Russian: Александр Дмитриевич Локтионов; 23 August [O.S. 11 August] 1893) – 28 October 1941) was a Soviet general.

In 1923 he was given command of the 2nd Infantry Division in Belarus, and the next year he became a member of the Minsk City Council. In 1925 he became a member of the Central Executive Committee of the Byelorussian Soviet Socialist Republic and the Central Party Committee before continuing his education at the Frunze Military Academy in 1927. At the end of 1930 he became the commanding officer and commissar of the 4th Rifle Corps. From 1933 to 1937, he was assistant commander of the Byelorussian and subsequently Kharkov Air Force Military Districts.

From 1937 to 1939, he served as commander-in-chief of the Soviet Air Force. In July 1940, after the Soviet occupation of the Baltic states, Loktionov was appointed commander of the Special Baltic Military District. In June 1941, he was arrested on fabricated charges of participation in an anti-Soviet conspiracy. Under interrogation, he was brutally beaten by infamous NKVD interrogators Boris Rodos and Lev Shvartsman, and lost consciousness several times from the torture. He was later put in a "confrontation" with Kirill Meretskov; the NKVD used Loktionov's bloodied appearance to intimidate Meretskov. After the German Invasion of the Soviet Union, he was moved from a local NKVD prison to the Kuybyshev prison, where he was shot without trial on 28 October along with many others on the personal orders of Lavrentiy Beria. He was posthumously rehabilitated in 1955.

== See also ==
- 1941 Red Army Purge

Military offices
| Preceded by Yakov Alksnis | Soviet Air Force (VVS) Commander; 1937–1939 | Succeeded by Yakov Smushkevich |
