= Ernst Schacht =

Swiss-born Soviet Air Forces lieutenant general (1904–1942)

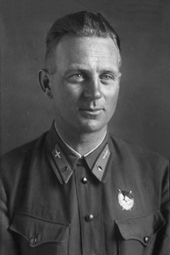
- Born: 14 April 1904; Basel, Switzerland
- Died: 23 February 1942 (aged 37) location unknown
- Military career
- Allegiance: Soviet Union
- Branch: Soviet Air Forces
- Service years: 1923 – 1941
- Rank: Major-General
- Conflicts: Basmachi Revolt; Spanish Civil War
- Awards: Hero of Soviet Union

Ernst Schacht (Russian: Эрнст Генрихович Шахт; 14 April 1904 – 23 February 1942), a Swiss of German origin, emigrated to the Soviet Russia in 1922 when he was 18 years old. Enlisting in the Soviet air force, he headed the Soviet bomber squadron which, on 7 November 1936, bombed Nationalist forces during the siege of Madrid.

== Biography ==
Schacht was born on 14 April 1904, in Basel, Switzerland. From 1918 to 1921 he worked as apprentice painter and apprentice electrical engineer.

In 1918 he started his political activity with being a member of Communist Union of Youth of Switzerland. From July to November 1921 Schacht was technical secretary of the Central Committee of Communist Union of Youth. In November 1921 he became the representative of Central Committee of Communist Union of Youth of Switzerland at Berlin bureau of Young Communist International. In April 1922 Ernst Schacht emigrated to USSR because of political reasons.

In 1922-1923 Schacht worked as an electrical engineer in Moscow, in the International Workers' Committee for Help for Starving.

He enlisted in the Red Army in May 1923, and in 1924 he graduated from Borisoglebsk Military Aviation School for pilots, in 1925 - from Higher School of Aerial Gunnery and Bombardment in Serpukhov. From 1925 to 1926 he served as pilot in the 1st Light Bomber Aviation Squadron named after Vladimir Lenin, based in the Moscow Military District.

From December 1926 to December 1931, Ernst Schacht was deployed in the Central Asian Military District to fight Basmachi Movement as squad commander in 35th Aviation Detachment and 37th Aviation Squadron. In 1929 he was awarded the Order of the Red Banner for his valour and heroism during these combat missions.

In 1931 Schacht graduated from courses of improvement of command personnel at Zhukovsky Air Force Academy. Since December 1931, he served as commander of Squadron for Special Objectives, based on Moscow Central Airport, which was tasked with carrying the commanders of the Red Army. In May 1936 he was awarded the Order of Lenin for high results in flight training.

From September 1936 to February 1937 Ernst Schacht participated in the Spanish Civil War. At first he was training Spanish Republican pilots at Alcalá de Henares Airbase, in October he assumed command of 1st Bomber Squadron. His first combat sortie in Spain was at 28 October 1936 - it was an airstrike on Tablada airbase near Seville. During the war Ernst Schacht made several dozens sorties in Tupolev SB.

On 31 December 1936, Schacht was awarded the title of Hero of the Soviet Union and Order of Lenin for his performance in the Spanish Civil War.

In June 1937, he became the chief of Lipetsk Higher Flight-Tactical School.

In August 1939, Ernst Schacht was made the head of Ryazan Higher Courses of Advancement of the Air Force. In 1940 he graduated from the Higher Academical Courses of Military Academy of the General Staff. In April 1940 he took command of 167th Reserve Aviation Regiment in Ryazan, in which methods for "blind" flights were developed. In November 1940 he became deputy commander of the Air Force of Orel Military District, responsible for high education.

On 30 May 1941, Ernst Schacht was arrested as "German spy and participant of anti-Soviet military conspiracy, who provided Germans with data about Soviet aviation industry".

He was executed by firing squad on 23 February 1942 by the orders of Lavrentiy Beria.

He was posthumously rehabilitated in 1955. His place of his burial is unknown, but a cenotaph to him is located at the Moscow Vvedenskoye Cemetery.

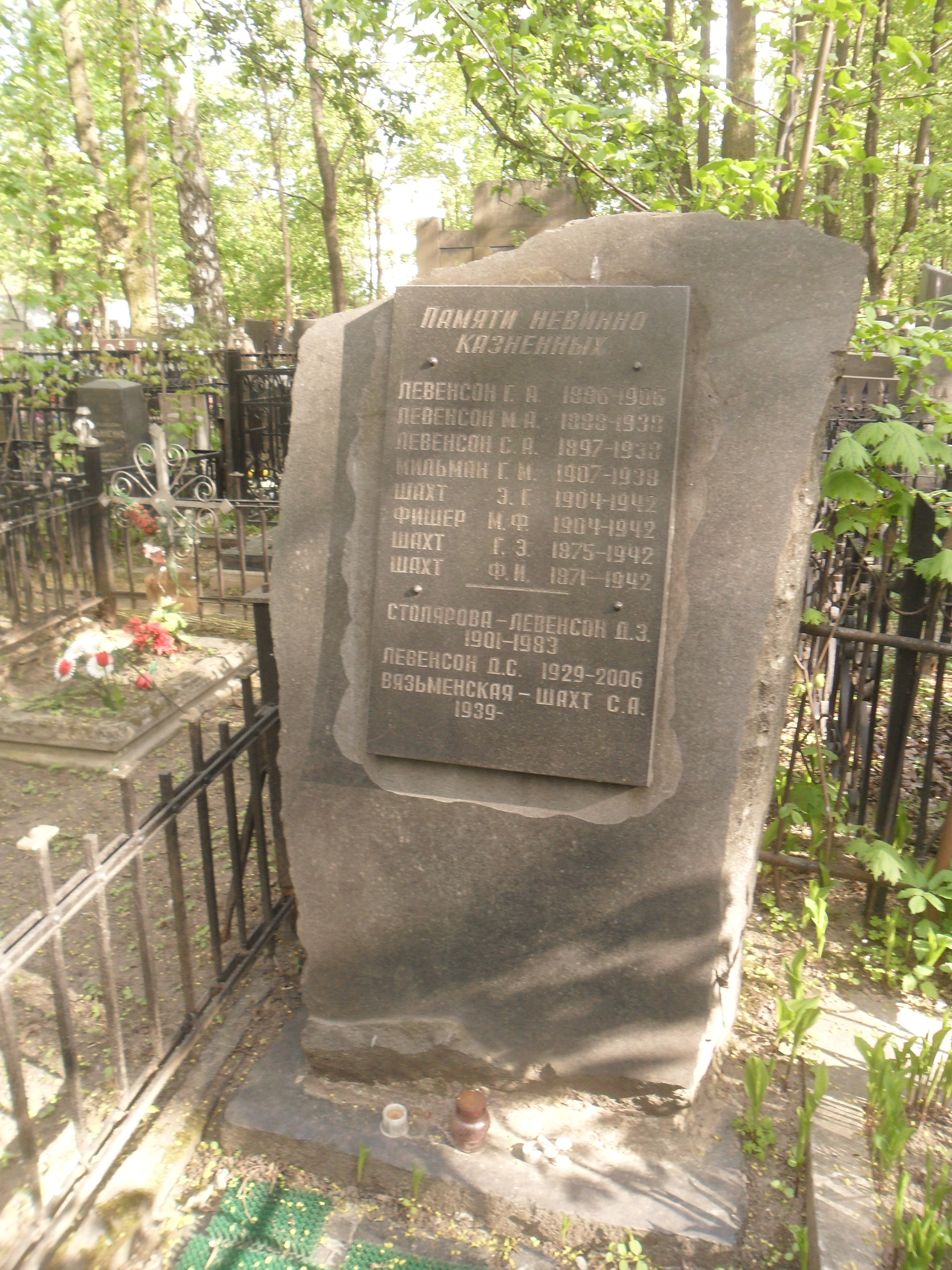
A cenotaph to Ernst Schacht in Moscow

== Awards ==
- Hero of the Soviet Union (1936)
- Order of Lenin (twice, both 1936)
- Order of the Red Banner (1929)

== See also ==
- 1941 Red Army Purge
