= Mikhail Grabsky =

Soviet-American tanker, Hero of the Soviet Union (1923–2007)

- Native name: מיכאיל גראַבסקי
- Born: 3 April 1923; Kyiv, Ukrainian SSR, Soviet Union
- Died: 3 August 2007 (aged 84) St. Louis, Missouri, United States
- Branch: Red Army
- Service years: 1941–1946
- Rank: Sergeant
- Conflicts: Second World War
- Awards: Hero of the Soviet Union

Mikhail Isaakovich Grabsky (Russian: Михаил Исаакович Грабский, Yiddish: מיכאיל יסאַקאָוויטש גראַבסקי; 3 April 1923 – 3 August 2007) was a Soviet Jewish tank commander who served in the Red Army during the Second World War. He was the commander of the 52nd Tank Guards Brigade of the 6th Guards Tank Corps, and attained the rank of sergeant by the end of the war. In 1982, Grabsky emigrated to the United States for permanent residence, which was regarded by the Soviet leadership as a betrayal. On 14 April 1983, Grabsky's title of Hero of the Soviet Union was revoked, as were all of his other awards. However, on 15 August 2000, by the decision of the Court of Appeals of the Supreme Court of Russia, Grabsky's awards were reinstated.

== Biography ==
Grabsky was born on 3 April 1923 in Kyiv to a working-class Jewish family. On 25 June 1941, following the beginning of Operation Barbarossa, he volunteered for the Red Army, and originally served in the infantry. After being wounded at the Battle of Stalingrad, he was sent to join a tank crew. As commander of the 52nd Tank Guards Brigade, he distinguished himself in the autumn of 1943, during the Battle of Kiev. In late September 1943, Soviet troops established a bridgehead in the Lyutizh, on the right bank of the Dnieper. Just before dawn on 4 November 1943, the 52nd Tank Guards Brigade's tanks landed on the bridgehead, via ferry. During an attack on enemy positions, Grabsky was in the vanguard, destroying one Tiger tank and as a result, helping the 52nd Tank Guards Brigade to cross the Dnieper.

After crossing, the 52nd Guards Tank Brigade launched an offensive in the direction of Pushcha-Vodytsia. Grabsky's tank operated in the first echelon, and was hit on the starboard side during the battle. The damage turned out to be insignificant, and after 2 hours the car was repaired by the crew, later taking part in a bypass manoeuvre to Pushcha-Vodytsia. By the morning of 5 November, the town had been completely cleared of the enemy.

Following the liberation of Pushcha-Vodytsia, the 52nd Guards Tank Brigade received a new task; the liberation of Sviatoshyn, as well as cutting off the Kyiv-Zhytomyr highway, before seizing Fastiv, home to a railway junction. They travelled 60 kilometres, reaching Fastiv within a few hours. The German units were, at first, overwhelmed by the sudden attack of so many Soviet tanks, and retreated, before later launching a counter-attack. What followed was a 12-hour battle in which the Soviet forces successfully repelled the German counter-attack, before they eventually managed to take Fastiv. Grabsky's tank crew recorded 3 tanks destroyed during the battle.

On 10 January 1944, by the decree of the Presidium of the Supreme Soviet, Grabsky was awarded Hero of the Soviet Union for courage shown during the Battle of the Dnieper, as well as the Order of Lenin. The 52nd Tank Guards Brigade went towards Berlin, fighting in the Prague offensive.

=== Post-war activities ===
In 1946, Grabsky was demobilised. In 1967, he graduated from the Moscow Correspondence Institute of Local Industry, and from 1979 to 1982, he worked as the head of UkrGlavSnaba.

In 1982, Grabsky permanently emigrated to the United States in order to reunite with his son and his family. This act was regarded as a betrayal of the Soviet Union, and as a result, by the decree of the Presidium of the Supreme Soviet, all of his awards were revoked on 14 April 1983 and he was charged with treason in absentia.

On 2 December 1995, by the decree of President of Ukraine Leonid Kuchma, Grabsky's awards, including his Hero of the Soviet Union, were reinstated in Ukraine. However, this decree held no legal force, as Russia is considered to be the legal successor to the Soviet Union. Nevertheless, this decree played a role in restoring Grabsky's awards, as the Ukrainian SSR proposal to cancel Grabsky's awards on the basis of his emigration was nullified.

By the declaration of the Court of Appeals of the Supreme Court of the Russian Federation on 15 August 2000, Grabsky was restored as a Hero of the Soviet Union, all revoked awards were returned, and he was declared to be innocent of treason. However, Grabsky never returned to Russia, and continued to spend his remaining days in Florida. He died on 3 August 2007 in St. Louis, Missouri.
