= Semyon Bychkov (pilot) =

Soviet military aviator and Axis collaborator (1918–1946)

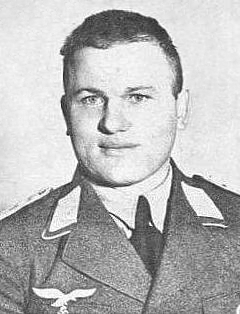
- Born: 15 May 1918; Petrovka, Voronezh Governorate, Russian SFSR, Soviet Union
- Died: 4 November 1946 (aged 28); Moscow, Russian SFSR, Soviet Union
- Cause of death: Execution by firing squad
- Military career
- Allegiance: Soviet Union; Nazi Germany
- Branch: Soviet Air Forces; Luftwaffe
- Service years: 1939–1943 (Nazi Germany) 1943–1945
- Rank: (Soviet Union) Captain (Nazi Germany) Major
- Conflicts: World War II
- Awards: Ostvolk Medal 2nd class with swords All revoked: Hero of the Soviet Union; Order of Lenin; Order of the Red Banner (2)

Semyon Trofimovich Bychkov (Russian: Семён Трофимович Бычков; 15 May 1918 – 4 November 1946) was a Soviet military pilot during World War II. He served first in Soviet Air Forces, where he downed seventeen German aircraft. In 1943, Bychkov was awarded the Hero of the Soviet Union, the highest distinction in the Soviet Union. After he was shot down and captured by the Germans, Bychkov defected and co-founded the 1st Aircraft Regiment of the Committee of Liberation Movement of People of Russia, under the auspices of Russian Liberation Army (ROA).

In April 1945, Bychkov surrendered to the Third United States Army and was then handed over to the Soviet forces. He was tried as a traitor and executed by firing squad, being posthumously stripped of all Soviet awards on 21 March 1947.

== Early life and career ==
Bychkov was born in the village of Petrovka, Voronezh Oblast. In 1939 he was drafted into the Red Army and attached to the Air Force. He graduated from Borisoglebsk Red Banner Flying School and continued his education in the 12th Reserve Aircraft Regiment before being sent to the front as part of the 287th Fighter Aviation Regiment, but he later became a deputy squadron commander in the 482nd Fighter Aviation Regiment. He saw combat on the Western and Northwestern Front of the Eastern Theatre of World War II.

In July 1942, following a crash, Bychkov was sentenced by a military tribunal to five years in a labor camp. On 1 October, the War Council lifted the sentence and Bychkov continued his service. By August 1943 he had participated in sixty air combats and downed seventeen German aircraft. On 2 September 1943, he received the title of Hero of the Soviet Union.

== Collaboration with Germany ==
On 10 December 1943, Bychkov was downed by anti-aircraft fire and captured in an unconscious state. After recovering in a German hospital, he was sent to a camp for imprisoned pilots in Suwałki.

In 1944, Bychkov agreed to collaborate with the Germans, and co-founded the 1st Aircraft Regiment of the Committee of Liberation Movement of People of Russia, under the auspices of Russian Liberation Army (ROA), and was awarded the German Ostvolk Medal 2nd class with swords. Bychkov then participated in anti-partisan warfare around Dvinsk and became the chief of night-time bombing in the ROA.

== Return to the Soviet Union ==
At the end of the war, together with other members of Vlasov's army, Bychkov surrendered to the 12th Corps of the American 3rd Army. In September he was transferred from Cherbourg and handed over to the Soviets.

On 24 August 1946, Bychkov was tried by the tribunal of Moscow Military District and sentenced to death by firing squad. The next day Bychkov submitted an appeal for pardon, but it was rejected and the sentence was carried out on 4 November of the same year. On 21 March 1947, he was posthumously stripped of all honors that had been awarded to him by the Soviet Union.
