= Pyotr Pumpur =

Soviet Air Forces lieutenant general (1900–1942)

Pyotr Ivanovich Pumpur
- Born: 25 April 1900; Plātere Parish (now Ogre Municipality), Kreis Riga, Livonia Governorate, Russian Empire
- Died: 23 February 1942 (aged 41) Saratov, Russian SFSR, USSR
- Allegiance: Soviet Russia (1918–1922); Soviet Union (1922–1941)
- Branch: Soviet Air Forces
- Service years: 1918–1941
- Rank: Lieutenant general
- Commands: Air Forces of the Moscow Military District; Air Forces of the Special Red Banner Far Eastern Army
- Conflicts: Russian Civil War; Spanish Civil War
- Awards: Hero of the Soviet Union; Order of Lenin (2); Order of the Red Banner

Pyotr Ivanovich Pumpur (Russian: Пётр Ива́нович Пу́мпур, Latvian: Pēteris Pumpurs; 25 April 1900 – 23 February 1942) was a Soviet Air Forces fighter pilot, Hero of the Soviet Union, and lieutenant general of Latvian ethnicity.

Pumpur joined the Red Army in 1918 and became a mechanic and driver in its fledgling air service due to his civilian mechanical and driving experience. After the end of the Russian Civil War he became one of the first to graduate from newly established flight schools and served as a fighter pilot during the interwar period, rising to command a fighter brigade in the mid-1930s. Between 1936 and 1937, he commanded the Soviet aviation group assisting the Spanish Republican Air Force during the Spanish Civil War, claiming five victories. For his actions, Pumpur was made a Hero of the Soviet Union, and promoted to the rank of Komkor, skipping one grade, upon his return to the Soviet Union.

He was arrested in the Purge of the Red Army in 1941 on 31 May 1941 and executed the following year.

== Early life and Russian Civil War ==
Pumpur was born on 25 April 1900 in Plātere Parish in Kreis Riga, Russian Empire to a peasant family. He graduated from the parish school and helped his father in working for their more prosperous neighbors, then studied at a vocational school for two years. Using the knowledge he gained, Pumpur became an apprentice mechanic and an assistant chauffeur before joining the Red Army in May 1918. Due to his work as a mechanic and with cars, he was sent to the 4th Fighter Aviation Detachment in Moscow, serving as an assistant chauffeur. In October, Pumpur was transferred to the 2nd Pskov Fighter Aviation Detachment in Samara, again serving in the same position.

Pumpur served only briefly with the 2nd Detachment, transferring back to the 4th Detachment in November, which he remained with until June 1921. With the 4th Detachment, he became an aircraft mechanic, fighting on the Eastern, Southeastern, Southern, and Western Fronts of the Russian Civil War. In 1919, Pumpur became a member of the Communist Party.

== Interwar period ==
After the Civil War ended, Pumpur remained in the army, serving as an aircraft mechanic with the Commandant's Headquarters of the Central Aerodrome in Moscow from July to December 1921. After constantly interacting with pilots, listening to their conversations and stories, he requested to receive flight training. Pumpur received initial training at the Yegoryevsk Military-Theoretical School for Pilots between January 1922 and March 1923. In April, he began flight training at the 2nd Military School of Pilots at Borisoglebsk, graduating with the first class of cadets on 26 October. Among his ten classmates was future aviation pioneer Valery Chkalov. From November to May 1924 Pumpur continued to master flying techniques at the 1st Military School of Pilots in Moscow, and studied at the Higher Military Aviation School of Gunners and Bombardiers in Serpukhov from May to July.

After graduation, in August 1924, Pumpur was assigned to the 2nd Fighter Aviation Squadron in Moscow, where he served as a junior pilot and then a senior pilot, mastering all types of aircraft flown by the unit. In July 1925, the squadron was involved in the suppression of a Menshevik and Socialist Revolutionary-backed revolt near the Illinsky Station of the Moscow–Kursk Railway, using its planes to conduct reconnaissance. In October of that year Pumpur became a flight leader, and in December 1926 the 2nd Squadron was renamed the 7th Separate Fighter Aviation Squadron. He led a separate detachment of the squadron from February 1927. In 1929, Pumpur graduated from advanced courses for Air Force commanders at the Zhukovsky Air Force Academy. He took command of the 17th Aviation Squadron in September 1930, simultaneously serving as its commissar from February 1931, and was subsequently transferred to command the 31st Fighter Aviation Squadron. From June 1934, he was commander and commissar of the 403rd Fighter Aviation Brigade. On 4 December 1935, after the Red Army created personal military ranks, Pumpur was made a Kombrig. In February 1936, Pumpur became a student at the operational faculty of the Zhukovsky Academy.

From October 1936 to May 1937, he served as a Soviet advisor to the Spanish Republican Air Force during the Spanish Civil War, under the pseudonym "Colonel Julio". After arriving in Spain, the initial group of Soviet pilots, which also included Yevgeny Erlykin, Ivan Kopets, and Anton Kovalevsky in addition to Pumpur, flew their first sorties on the obsolete Spanish Republican Nieuport 52s. Pumpur led a fighter group of Soviet pilots in the defense of Madrid, flying 250 hours and downing five enemy aircraft. For his actions he received the title Hero of the Soviet Union on 4 July 1937, and upon his return Pumpur was promoted directly to Komkor from Kombrig, skipping the rank of Komdiv. In October, he became commander of the Air Forces of the Moscow Military District, but was soon transferred to lead the Air Forces of the Special Red Banner Far Eastern Army (VVS OKDVA) in November. Pumpur spent several months at the disposal of the chief of the Air Force, and in December 1938 became head of the flight testing station at Aircraft Plant No. 1, later becoming head of the Air Force's Combat Training Directorate. During the Winter War, he led a group of instructors for combat training. From 1940, Pumpur again commanded the Air Forces of the Moscow Military District.

== Downfall ==
Just before the beginning of Operation Barbarossa, the German invasion of the Soviet Union, in June 1941, Pumpur's downfall began. The inspection commission of the Air Force discovered a large number of significant issues in the aviation units of the Moscow Military District, and Pumpur, the district air force commander, was blamed for them. Among the issues were a lack of combat training and inactivity in organizing airfield construction. For "disrupting combat readiness," a 10 May resolution of the Politburo relieved him of command and deprived him of his rank and awards. Pumpur was arrested on 31 May and on 13 February 1942 was sentenced to death, charged with participating in a "military conspiracy" and "sabotage". He was shot on 23 February of that year, and rehabilitated on 25 June 1955.
