= Ivan Proskurov =

Soviet aviator and lieutenant general (1907–1941)

- Native name: Иван Иосифович Проскуров
- Born: 18 February [O.S. 5 February] 1907; Malaya Tokmachka, Taurida Governorate, Russian Empire (today in Zaporizhzhia Oblast, Ukraine)
- Died: 28 October 1941 (aged 34) Barbysh, Kuibyshev oblast, Russian SFSR, Soviet Union
- Service years: 1931–1941
- Rank: Lieutenant general
- Conflicts: Spanish Civil War; World War II
- Awards: Hero of the Soviet Union

Ivan Iosifovich Proskurov (Russian: Иван Иосифович Проскуров; 18 February [O.S. 5 February] 1907 – 28 October 1941) was a Soviet pilot and recipient of the title Hero of the Soviet Union, best known as the chief of military intelligence who tried in vain to warn Joseph Stalin that the Red Army was ill-prepared to defend the USSR against a German invasion – unwelcome advice which apparently cost him his life.

== Early career ==
The son of a railway worker, he was educated at the Kharkov Institute of Mechanization and Electrification of Agriculture and worked as a farm labourer in the village on the Dnieper, and later as a factory worker, and joined the Communist Party in 1927. He enlisted in the Red Army in 1931, and trained at the Stalingrad school for military pilots in 1931–33. After graduating, he became a flight instructor. In 1936, he made a record-breaking flight to Khabarovsk, in the Far East, in 54 hours and 13 minutes, to deliver an engineer and spare parts to the famous Soviet pilot, Valery Chkalov, who had damaged his plane in an accident. In September 1936, he was secretly sent to Spain to assist the republican side in the Spanish Civil War. From February 1937, he was commander of the First Bombardment Squadron, during the defence of Madrid, but was recalled to Moscow shortly after Soviet aircraft bombed a German battleship off Ibiza, killed 31 German sailors, and provoked Hitler to retaliate by bombing Almería. On his return, he was rapidly promoted, as the higher ranks of military were decimated in the Great Purge. In 1938, he was appointed head of the Second Special Aviation Army on the Far Eastern Front.

== Head of Military Intelligence ==
Proskurov was appointed head of Soviet military intelligence, the GRU, and deputy USSR People's Commissar for Defence, on 14 April 1939. Soon after his appointment, he picked up intelligence that the Nazi regime was planning to invade Poland, and wanted to open secret discussions with Moscow. The outcome was the non-aggression pact signed in August 1939, which preceded the dismemberment of Poland. Prior to the Soviet attack on Finland, in 1940, Proskurov inspected the Soviet front line and reached a scathing conclusion about the Red Army's preparedness, which earned him the enmity of the newly appointed People's Commissar for Defence, Semyon Timoshenko. After the Finnish debacle, when the Military Council met in April, Proskurov refused to accept Stalin's line that poor intelligence was to blame.

Proskurov sent the first report to Stalin, Vyacheslav Molotov and Marshal Timoshenko on 6 June 1940, warning that as soon as France had been forced to capitulate, the Germans would begin preparing an invasion of the USSR. On 19 June, he followed with a warning about the build up of German troops on the Lithuanian border. This conflicted with Stalin's unshakable belief that Hitler would honour the non-aggression pact.

== Downfall ==
Proskurov was sacked in July 1940, and replaced by the more pliable Filipp Golikov. He was unemployed until October, when he was assigned a senior role managing bomber pilots. On 4 April 1941, Stalin sent Timoshenko a note directing that Proskurov be arrested, but the decision was delayed, and on 19 June he was appointed commander of the air forces of the Seventh Army. He had not taken up his command when the Germans attacked. He was on the northern front, in Karelia, when he was arrested on 27 June. He was one of a large group of former military officers who were shot on 28 October 1941.
