= Yakov Smushkevich =

Soviet Air Forces lieutenant general (1902–1941)

Yakov Vladimirovich Smushkevich
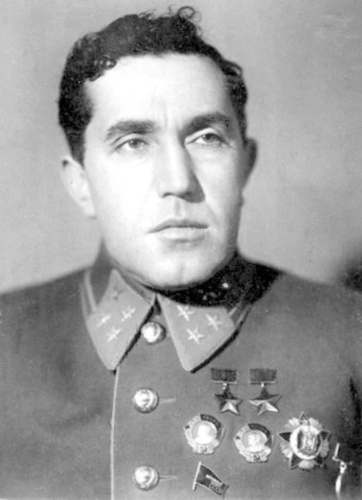
- Native name: Lithuanian: Jakovas Smuškevičius; Russian: Яков Владимирович Смушкевич; Russian: Яков Вульфович Смушкевич
- Nickname: General Douglas
- Born: 14 April [O.S. 1 April] 1902; Rokiškis, Kovno Governorate, Russian Empire (today part of Lithuania)
- Died: 28 October 1941 (aged 39) Barbysh, Kuibyshev oblast, Russian SFSR, Soviet Union
- Allegiance: Soviet Union
- Branch: Soviet Air Force
- Service years: 1918 – 1941
- Rank: General-Lieutenant of Aviation
- Commands: Soviet Air Force
- Conflicts: Russian Civil War; Polish–Soviet War; Spanish Civil War; Battle of Khalkhin Gol; World War II; Winter War
- Awards: Hero of the Soviet Union (twice)
- Spouse: Basia Solomonovna
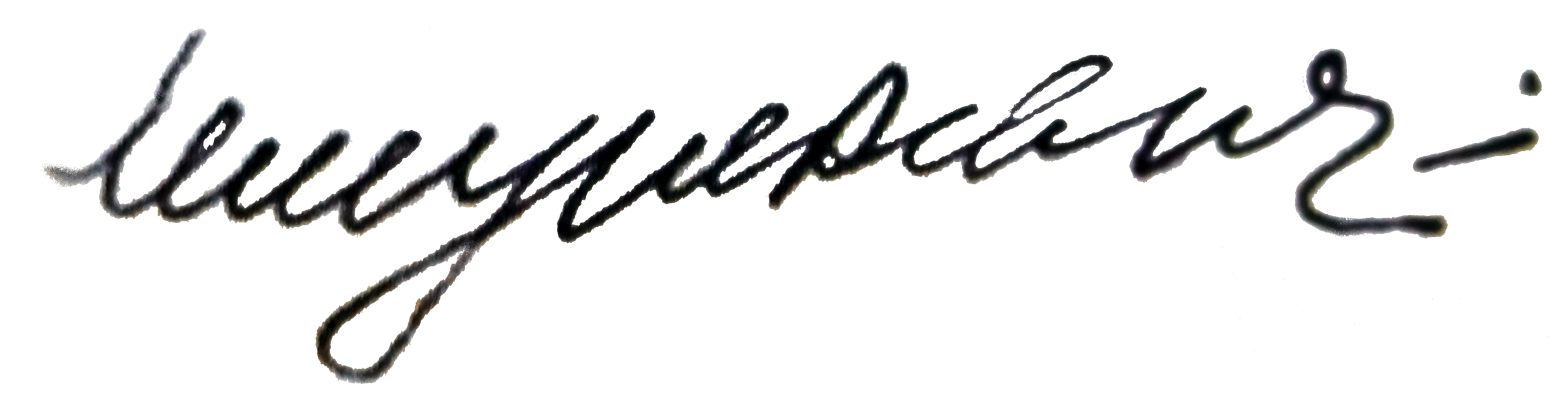
- Signature

Yakov Vladimirovich Smushkevich (Lithuanian: Jakovas Smuškevičius, Russian: Яков Владимирович Смушкевич, also Яков Вульфович Смушкевич,; 14 April [O.S. 1 April] 1902 – 28 October 1941) was the Commander of the Soviet Air Forces from 1939 to 1940 and the first Jewish Hero of the Soviet Union. Arrested shortly before the start of Operation Barbarossa on falsified charges of being part of an anti-Soviet conspiracy, he became the only man to receive the Hero of the Soviet Union twice and then be executed. The charges were posthumously dropped and he was rehabilitated in 1954.

He participated in the Spanish Civil War, where he was known as "General Douglas". For his service in Spain he received the title of Hero of the Soviet Union. He was in charge of aviation for the 1st Army Corps at the Battle of Khalkhin Gol, again receiving the title of Hero of the Soviet Union. He was the commander of the Soviet Air Force from 1939 to 1940, and Deputy Chief of the General Staff from 1940 to 1941. He was arrested in June 1941 and executed without trial on the personal orders of Lavrentiy Beria on 28 October 1941 in Kuybyshev.

== Early life ==
Smushkevich was born on 14 April [O.S. 1 April] 1902 to a Lithuanian Jewish family in Rokiškis, Kovno Governorate (present-day part of Lithuania). He completed only three grades of primary school before the Emperor of Russia ordered the deportation and exile of all Jews in frontline areas of the First World War, resulting in he and the rest of his family being exiled to the Arkhangelsk Oblast in the far north of Russia. There, despite his young age, he worked at a bakery and a pier until he was allowed to return to Lithuania with his family in 1917. In 1918 he entered the Red Army and fought in the 1st Minsk Communist Battalion. In 1919 the battalion was placed on the Western front to fight in the Polish-Soviet War. While commissar of the battalion he was injured during a battle in Belarus and captured. He was imprisoned in Baranavichy and Vilnius before his escape in Spring 1920, after which he eventually became the political instructor of the 144th Rifle Regiment. From 1921 to 1922 he was the head of the Cheka in Klintsy county, now part of the Bryansk region. His police unit participated in operations in the Gomel oblast, and in March 1922 he was transferred to the 3rd Infantry Regiment. There he served as the deputy commissar until September when he was made the party organizer of the 4th Separate Fight Aviation Squadron in Minsk. From August 1923 to February 1926 he was the political instructor of the squadron. While a political instructor he attended the Belarusian State University, but did not complete his studies there due to receiving a new post before he could finish. He went on to receive several promotions before graduating from the M.V.Frunze military academy in 1930, after which he was appointed as the deputy head of the political department of the 2nd Aviation Brigade. In late 1931 he became the commander of the 2nd Mixed Aviation Brigade, which soon became a role model unit in the Soviet military and was praised by the government of the Byelorussian SSR. In 1932 he attended a flight training program in Kachinskygy where he learned to fly the I-5. He left his position in command of the brigade in 1936 due to the start of the Spanish civil war.

== Spanish Civil War ==
Smushkevich arrived in Spain as part of a group of Soviet volunteers in October 1936. There, he worked as a senior advisor to the commander of the Spanish Republican Air Force and lived under the pseudonym General Douglas. During the conflict he gained 223 flight hours, over half of them on the I-15 fighter. He was reprimanded for spending too much time flying combat missions instead of leading the Spanish as commander of the Madrid Air Defense. In June 1937 he returned to the Soviet Union and was awarded the title Hero of the Soviet Union. That year he became the deputy head of the Soviet Air Forces.

== Neman R-10 crash ==
On 30 April 1938 Smushkevich was badly injured while conducting a practice flight on a R-10 in preparation for a parade before it crashed due to mechanical failure. The plane was a gift from Kharkov; upon taking off he had been in the air for less than a minute and reached an altitude of no more than 50 meters before the crash. Rescuers found him unconscious and badly disfigured, with burns to his back, multiple fractures in his legs and feet, crushed thighbones, and head injuries. His legs were almost amputated due to the extent of the injuries, but they were not. After surgery he was left with one leg shorter than the other and was unable to move them for a long time. After remaining bedridden for several months he was eventually able to fly again, but problems with his badly damaged legs continued to plague him for the remainder of his life.

== Battle of Khalkin Gol ==
After Japanese forces attacked Mongolian cavalry in the disputed territory east of the Khalkin Gol river in May 1939, Smushkevich was sent to Mongolia as the commander of the air force portion of the 1st Army Group. There he spent much of his time training pilots for missions, which were flown on the new I-16 and I-153 fighters. After returning to the USSR in September he was awarded the title Hero of the Soviet Union again on 17 November 1939 for his role in gaining air superiority over the Japanese.

== Winter War ==
In November 1939 Smushkevich became the Commander-in-Chief of the Soviet Air Force. During the Soviet-Finnish War he visited the front on multiple occasions and managed the development of an aviation regiment of pilots trained for flying in bad weather. In his final report to the Main Military Council of the Red Army, he noted and criticized failures of the Soviet military's organization and training.

== World War II and downfall ==
In August 1940 Smushkevich was made the Inspector-General of the Air Force, and Pavel Rychagov replaced him as commander-in-chief. That year he supported the establishment of a new military academy for navigators and aviation commanders. In December he became the assistant chief of General Staff of the Air Force, where he spent much of his time worrying about the lack of training pilots had for flying in poor weather and the shortage of pilots able to use new equipment. Aleksandr Golovanov suggested that he write a letter to Stalin expressing his concerns.

He was arrested in early June 1941 while in the hospital, several days after having had another surgery on his legs. Many other generals of the air force were also arrested on fabricated charges of participating in an anti-Soviet conspiracy shortly before the start of Operation Barbarossa. While he was in prison he was badly beaten before being forced to stand in front of his former colleague Pavel Rychagov (who had been beaten so badly that it damaged his eardrum) in a pre-arranged "confrontation", where they were then supposed to accuse each other of a variety of charges. During interrogation threats were made against his family and his bandaged legs were hit with clubs when he refused to give the "confession" wanted by interrogators. On 28 October 1941 he was shot without trial in Kuybyshev. In 1947 his awards were revoked, but after the death of Stalin he was rehabilitated on 25 December 1954 and on 15 March 1957 his awards were reinstated.

== Awards and honors ==
- Twice Hero of the Soviet Union (21 June 1937 and 17 November 1939)
- Two Order of Lenin (3 January 1937 and 21 June 1937)
- Order of the Red Banner of Mongolia (10 August 1939)

Military offices
Preceded by Aleksandr Loktionov	Soviet Air Force (VVS) Commander; 1939–1940	Succeeded by Pavel Rychagov
