= Aerial warfare during Operation Barbarossa =

Operation Barbarossa
- Part of the Eastern Front of World War II
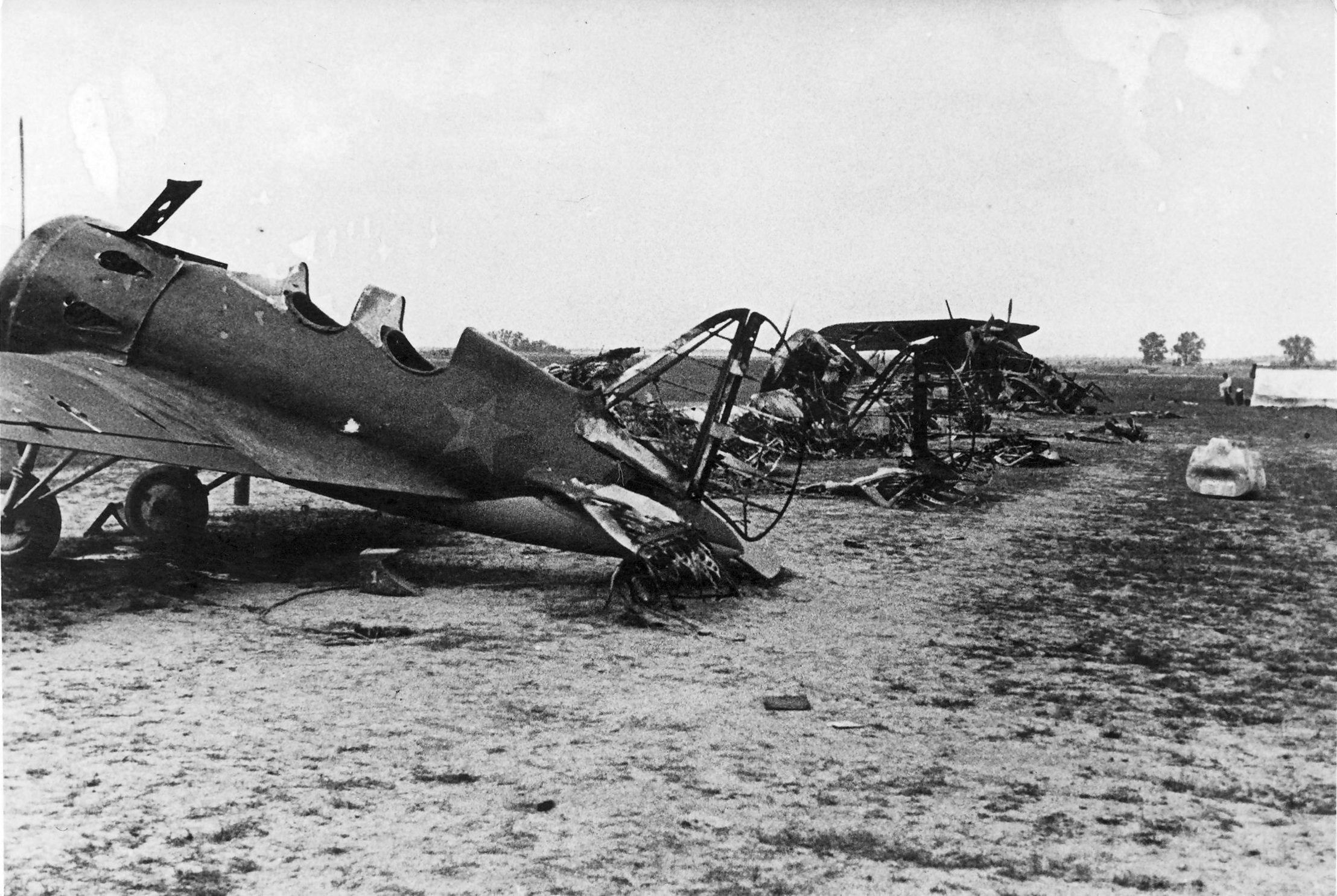
- Soviet aircraft knocked out, 22 June 1941. The plane in the foreground is a two-seat trainer version of the Polikarpov I-16 fighter.
Date	22 June – December 1941
Location	Soviet Union
Result	Inconclusive, Axis strategic failure

Belligerents
Soviet Union; United Kingdom	Germany; Hungary; Romania; Finland; Italy; Slovakia; Croatia

Commanders and leaders
(Soviet Union) Pavel Zhigarev (Soviet Union) Aleksandr Novikov (Soviet Union) Fyodor Michugin (Soviet Union) Aleksey Ionov (Soviet Union) Boris Pogrebov (Soviet Union) Fyodor Polynin	(Nazi Germany) Hermann Göring (Nazi Germany) Hans Jeschonnek (Nazi Germany) Albert Kesselring (Nazi Germany) Alexander Löhr (Nazi Germany) Alfred Keller (Nazi Germany) Hans-Jürgen Stumpff (Nazi Germany) W. von Richthofen (Nazi Germany) Kurt Pflugbeil (Nazi Germany) Bruno Loerzer (Nazi Germany) Robert Ritter von Greim (Kingdom of Romania) Ermil Gheorghiu (Kingdom of Romania) Emanoil Ionescu (Finland) Jarl Lundqvist (Fascist Italy) Enrico Pezzi

Strength
13,000 – 14,000 aircraft	4,389 German aircraft (2,598 combat); 980 other Axis aircraft

Casualties and losses
~21,200 aircraft Another 5,240 also disappeared off order of battle.	3,827 German aircraft 13,742 Luftwaffe personnel 3,231 killed 2,028 missing 8,453 wounded

Axis and Soviet air operations during Operation Barbarossa took place over a six-month period, 22 June – December, 1941. Aviation played a critical role in the fighting on the Eastern Front during this period, in the battles to gain and maintain air superiority or air supremacy, to offer close air support to armies on battlefield, interdicting enemy supply lines, while supplying friendly forces. The Axis air forces were generally better equipped, trained and experienced in executing military tactics and operations. This superiority increased because of the Great Purge in the 1930s and mass expansion of Soviet air forces, which did severe damage to organisational structures.

On the opening day, Axis counter-air operations succeeded in destroying 2,000 Soviet aircraft, and gaining air superiority. The success of the strike enabled the Axis to support their armies in highly successful encirclement battles in July to September 1941. Its transport fleet helped fly in vital supplies to the army when the Russian Winter weather made supply difficult on the ground. In particular, the Luftwaffe played an important role on the defensive, countering the Soviet offensive in December 1941. Despite debilitating losses, Soviet aviation also played a crucial role in stemming the invasion and allowing the Red Army to organise defences; first before Leningrad in July, then in slowing down the occupation of Ukraine, enabling the withdrawal of industries to the Ural Mountains, in Crimea, enabling a long-term stand at Sevastopol, and then during the defence and counter-offensive at Moscow.

In the event, the Axis land and air operations failed to achieve their ultimate goal – the defeat of the Soviet armed forces. When operations ended in December 1941, both sides had suffered heavy losses, unparalleled in the history of air warfare to this point. Some 21,000 Soviet and several thousand Axis aircraft were destroyed. With its factories in the Urals, out of range from Axis medium bombers, Soviet production increased, out-stripping its enemies and enabling the country to replace its aerial losses. The Axis had vastly underestimated Soviet industrial and technical potential. In the following years, Soviet air power recovered from the purges and losses, gradually gaining in tactical and operational competence while closing the technical gap.

== Background ==
By 1941, the Axis powers were in a comfortable position after defeating the Allies in Scandinavia, Western Europe and in the Balkans (leaving the British Empire as the only significant opposition). Axis forces deployed in Europe could only be engaged in the air or at sea, while the North African Campaign was unlikely to threaten its European territories. However, by this point of the war, Germany was in dire need of raw materials and oil resources available in the Soviet Union.

Adolf Hitler predicted this problem and on 18 December 1940 had issued Directive 21. It ordered the beginning of the preparations for Operation Barbarossa, the invasion of the USSR. On the other hand, the war with the British was far from concluded and the United States of America were supporting them, while showing an increasingly hostile attitude towards the Axis. A protracted war in the east could be disastrous, so a quick victory was essential.

The plan was to destroy the Soviet Union as a military, political and economic power, by occupying the country up to the A–A line (which fell just short of the Ural Mountains). This would yield vast resources such as oil, rare metals, industrial cities and huge populations which would work for the Third Reich as slave labourers. It would also provide enormous living space (German: Lebensraum) to the Reich and destroy what Hitler perceived to be Communism and Jewish Bolshevism (the main themes for the National Socialists since Hitler's political testament in Mein Kampf, published in 1924). His recently acquired allies (Romania, Slovakia and Finland) were to assist militarily and allow their countries to be used as a base for the German Defence Force (German: Wehrmacht) to launch its offensive.

Although defeated in the Battle of Britain, Germany's Air Force (German: Luftwaffe) played a vital role in the success of the German Army (German: Heer) during the Axis military campaigns against the Western Allies. For Operation Barbarossa, around 65% of the Luftwaffe would be deployed to support the rest of the Wehrmacht in defeating the Soviet Union.

== German offensive plan ==
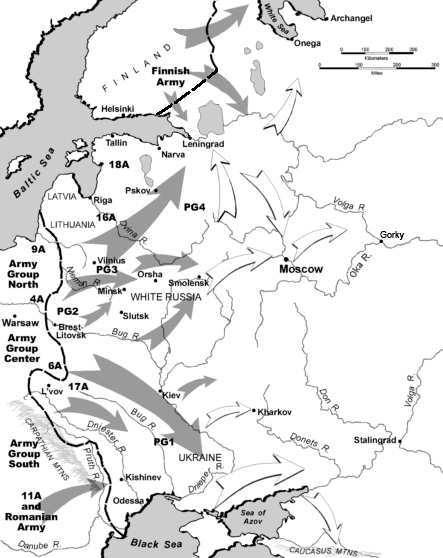
Original German plan

The German plan for the USSR was to win a quick war, before Soviet superiority in numbers and industry could take effect, and before the Red Army officer corps (decimated by Joseph Stalin's Great Purge in the 1930s) could recover. The method is usually labelled Blitzkrieg, though the concept is controversial and unrelated to any specific German doctrine.

Barbarossa's task was to destroy as much of the Soviet military forces as possible, west of the Dnieper River in Ukraine, in a series of encirclement operations, to prevent a Red Army retreat into the more eastern areas of Russia. There was hope this would be enough to force a collapse of the USSR and then the Wehrmacht could "mop up" the remaining enemy forces beyond the Dniepr.

The Luftwaffe was essential in the kind of operations the Axis' ground forces were going to perform. In the Inter-War period, the Luftwaffe developed its communications, aircraft, training programs, and to an extent its logistics to support mobile operations. Its primary mission was not direct close air support but operational-level interdiction. This entailed attacking enemy logistics, communications and air bases. Air strikes on Soviet war-making potential were forbidden by Hitler. It made little sense to destroy industry that would soon be in Axis hands; the German High Command (German: Oberkommando der Wehrmacht, OKW) did not believe the USSR could transfer its industry to the Ural Mountains. Counter-air operations were considered more important. In order for the Heer and the Luftwaffe's bombers to operate effectively in their roles, the first task of the Axis aviation was to eliminate the Soviet Air Force and deny the enemy the means to interfere with their operations. Once this had been carried out, close air support could be rendered to the ground forces. This had always been a core tenet of Luftwaffe doctrine. Once the A–A line had been reached, the Luftwaffe was to destroy the surviving factories in the Urals.

The Luftwaffe thus began preparations to neutralize the Military Aviation of the Workers' and Peasants Red Army (Russian: Voyenno-Vozdushnyye Sily Raboche-Krestyanskaya Krasnaya Armiya, VVS-RKKA often abbreviated to VVS). Airborne infantry operations were considered to capture river crossings but the heavy losses during the Battle of Crete consigned the Luftwaffe's paratrooper forces to a reserve role (when deployed, it was usually for special operations).

== Strength of the Luftwaffe ==
=== Supporting industry ===
There was no marked increase in German production in the autumn, 1940, in preparation for this major campaign. On 15 October, General Tschersich, the Luftwaffe's chief of procurement, was basing aircraft replacement on the assumption peace with Britain would be secured, and there would be no further military operations until 1 April 1947. Either the procurement officers of the Oberkommando der Luftwaffe (Air Force High Command or OKL) were unaware of Hitler's intentions, or they did not take him seriously.

Erhard Milch, responsible for production, warned the Oberkommando der Wehrmacht (German High Command or OKW) that the Soviet Union could not be defeated in 1941. He called for winter preparations and increases in production in the expectation the war in the East, even if successful, would last several years. Joseph Schmid, senior intelligence officer, and Otto Hoffmann von Waldau, Luftwaffe chief of operations, were also opposed to Barbarossa. Schmid still felt the Luftwaffe could defeat Britain by attacking its industries, while Waldau argued that dissipating German air strength along a wide 'air front' was deeply irresponsible. Waldau's continuing realism and non-concealed criticism of the Luftwaffe leadership and its prosecution of the war, led him to being removed from his post in 1942. Milch's skepticism soon became despair. He convinced himself a war in the East would be a disaster, and did everything he could to influence Göring to persuade Hitler not go ahead with Barbarossa. Initially, Göring kept his word, and argued that pursuing a strategy in the Mediterranean Theatre of Operations, particularly in conjunction with the Regia Marina (Italian Navy) against Gibraltar, while weakening the British hold on the eastern Mediterranean would be the most ideal strategy. Hitler dismissed this. Hitler also dismissed the Kriegsmarine's objections that it was the British and their shipping lanes that was the main enemy.

The battles in the Netherlands, Belgium, France and in the Balkans had inflicted losses the Luftwaffe had not fully replaced. By the conclusion of the Balkans campaign, the strain put on German resources and its effects on production was already showing, even before Barbarossa began. The Germans had only 1,511 bombers available for operations on 21 June 1941, compared with 1,711 on 11 May 1940, two hundred fewer. While overall, the Luftwaffe had remained much the same size, it was arguably weaker in crew quality than it had been in 1939, owing to the losses it had suffered, even in successful campaigns. The failures in production, and the fact that Barbarossa began with an inadequate number of aircraft, would lead to the Luftwaffe being severely depleted by the end of the year, and becoming increasingly ineffective, while consequently the VVS, thought destroyed in the early battles, became increasingly potent by end of 1941. The planning for Barbarossa went ahead, regardless of these failures, and the knowledge that experience in Western Europe had shown that while highly effective, close support operations were costly, and reserves needed to be created to replace losses.

In a document issued by the Department of the Luftwaffe General Staff on 15 November 1940, it was clear that production was barely adequate to maintain current strength, much less expansion of the Luftwaffe. It stated:

[Germany's] own [aircraft] production at best ensures maintenance of the present strength. Expansion is impossible (either in personnel or in material).

The Luftwaffe's production problems in 1941 lay not on the dilettantism of the Nazi leadership, but with a military leadership which did not understand the difficulties in producing modern weapons in large numbers and who evinced little worry about their enemy's capabilities. Udet, who had replaced Milch in technical and production affairs, possessed neither the temperament or technical background to do the job. The Chief of the General Staff, Hans Jeschonnek, displayed little interest in non-operational matters and the requirements of production and planning. Thus operational plans and production plans were not synthesised. In the coming campaigns, with increased commitment of the Luftwaffe, production remained the same. Production had always risen in 1933 to 1937, but thereafter it was allowed to level off, and did not pick up again until 1942. From 1 September 1939 to 15 November 1941, 16 revisions of production and planning were called for and designed, but none were carried through.

The strength of the Luftwaffe amounted to 4,389 aircraft, of which 2,598 were combat types and 1,939 were operational. The inventory amounted to 929 bombers, 793 fighters, 376 dive-bombers, 70 destroyers (Messerschmitt Bf 110s), 102 reconnaissance, and 60 ground attack aircraft, plus 200 fighters in reserve and 60 miscellaneous types. This force was spread across; 31 bomber, eight dive bomber, "one, one-third" ground attack, two twin-engine, and 19 single-engine fighter groups (Gruppen). Around 68 per cent of the German air strength was operational.

=== Operational capabilities ===
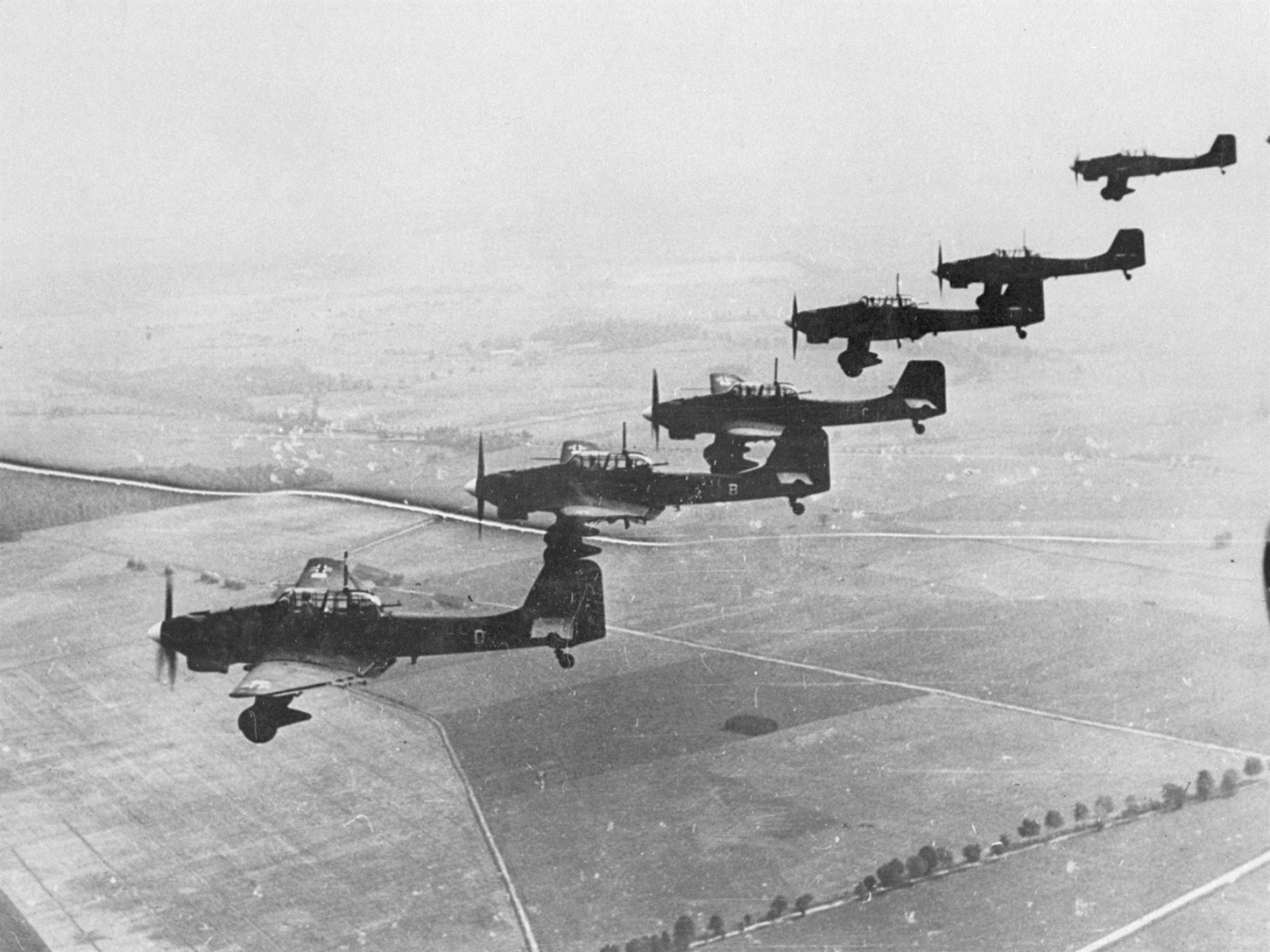
The Junkers Ju 87 Stuka. The primary close support weapon of the Luftwaffe in 1941.

The Luftwaffe was highly effective at carrying out close support operations, in direct or indirect support of the army and at winning and maintaining air superiority. German doctrine, and experiences in the Spanish Civil War, then Europe, had developed suitable aircraft for the role, such as the Messerschmitt Bf 109, Heinkel He 111, Dornier Do 17, Junkers Ju 88 and Junkers Ju 87. Their aircrews were still highly trained, and despite attrition, still had a cadre of experienced personnel. The air-to-ground support was the best in the World at the time. Forward air controllers (Flivos) were attached to every mechanised and panzer division, to allow for accurate air support, free from friendly-fire incidents and in real time.

The German air operations staff, at all levels, also practiced the concept of Auftragstaktik (or mission command) doctrine. It encouraged the improvisation of tactics within the framework of set operational goals and advocated by-passing some levels of command under some circumstances. The air units were told what to achieve by high echelons, but not how to do it. This form of command was encouraged at the lowest levels to maintain the initiative and operational tempo. The form of warfare was an ad hoc style, but it allowed field commanders to dis-assemble and re-assemble command structures at Air Corps level, and commit them to a crisis, or urgent operations within a short period of time. This gave the Luftwaffe an unmatched degree of tactical and operational flexibility.

However, during the course of Barbarossa the logistical elements had been largely ignored. Chief of the General Staff, Hans Jeschonnek, since his days as chief of the operations staff, had opposed the notion that organisation, maintenance and logistics should be the responsibility of the General Staff. Instead, he proposed that the Staff be kept small and confined to operational matters. Supply and organisation were not the General Staff's concern. The lack of attention to logistical detail was apparent in German plans. Virtually no attention or organisation had been prepared for logistics in the Soviet Union. The Wehrmacht optimistically assumed that mechanised forces could advance into the country without major supply difficulties. Depending on railroad repair teams to mend the Soviet rail system, they believed they could finish the campaign after reaching Smolensk, using it as a jumping off point to capture Moscow. However, the units scheduled to repair rail communications lay at the bottom of German priorities.

The ease with which the OKW assumed the Eastern campaign could be won did not take into account the enormous distances. This caused supply breakdowns and a big drop in the serviceability rates, reserves of spare parts, fuel and ammunition. This difficulty would only increase during the autumn rains, when Soviet roads were turned to quagmires. On occasion, only the transport fleet could fly in supplies to keep units operational. The Luftwaffe's operating radius was to go no deeper than Moscow, and stretched from Leningrad to Rostov-on-Don. This meant German air power was operating in a theatre of 579,150 square miles. The Luftwaffe started on a 995 miles front, which extended to 1,240 from Leningrad to Rostov, then a further 620 miles from Leningrad to Murmansk.

=== Strategic capability ===
Jeschonnek's view of air warfare was also flawed. He believed in the quick war. To this end he advocated throwing in all personnel, even training instructors into short but intensive campaigns. He did not believe in retaining reserves of pilots or material. He also, like Ernst Udet, head of the Technical Department, favoured dive bombers. He insisted all aircraft should have the capability, which retarded the development of capable bombers like the Heinkel He 177, by complicating the design, thus delaying development and production. The lack of a heavy bomber denied the Luftwaffe the chance to hit Soviet factories in the far reaches of the Urals and at least disrupt enemy production.

Strategic bombing could have been carried out during the first surprise operations in June 1941, especially on those Soviet armament works that lay within range of the He 111; near Moscow and Voronezh. However, the need for counter air and ground support operations predominated in German air thinking. Hitler demanded close air support for the army, implying at least one Air Corps should be attached to each of the three Army Groups. There were four Air Corps (or Fliegerkorps) in the Soviet Union, giving one possible reserve Corps. Had production been brought up to a level commensurate with total war in 1940 and early 1941, a reserve of one Air Corps could have been set aside for strategic operations to commence with air-land operations. The splitting of tactical and strategic air units, the later being formed into one unified air command, would have done much to clarify the problem of organisation. The Strategic air units could have been freed from ground support duties which they were not trained or equipped for, while being able to carry out strategic bombing as advocated by the late General Wever. The concept of concentrating all available forces for the army, in the decisive battle became invalid, since it was the ability of the Soviets to re-arm and rebuild, through the failure of the Axis to bomb industrial regions beyond the front, that contributed to ultimate failure of Barbarossa to win a decisive victory. It was not until the winter, 1941–42 that Jeschonnek and Hitler revisited the idea of producing a heavy bomber to hit far ranging targets. Fliegerkorps IV was finally ready for operations after the publication of the Luftwaffe study Battle against Russian Armaments Industry in November 1943. However, the project was abandoned as there was no capable aircraft.

=== Tactics and technical standards ===
In the tactical arena the Germans held significant leads against the Soviets. While the Soviets were not as primitive in aircraft design quality as believed, it was in tactical deployment, combat tactics, and training, along with accumulated experience that the Germans held qualitative superiority. In particular, the German Finger-four tactic was better and more flexible than the Vic formation adopted by the Soviets. Moreover, all German fighters possessed radios, so they could communicate with each other. Soviet aircraft lacked this, and pilots had to communicate with hand signals. Despite repeated warnings in the Winter War and Soviet–Japanese Border Wars, little to no investment was made in signals or air-to-air communications. During the later conflict, radios were not used and were thus removed. This was mostly because Soviet radios were too heavy and affected combat performance, while the Germans developed light radios.

The technical differences were enough to give the Luftwaffe the edge. The latest bomber type, the Junkers Ju 88, could outrun the main Soviet fighter, the I-16, above 3,000 metres (9,000 feet). At that altitude an I-16 could attack only if it took the Ju 88 by surprise. The SB bomber was the equal of the Bristol Blenheim, but it was largely defenceless against the German Messerschmitt Bf 109. In July 1941, waves of unescorted SBs would be shot down in large numbers in an effort to stop the German advance. The Ilyushin DB-3 bomber was both faster and better armed than the British Vickers Wellington, but again, it was still vulnerable to the Bf 109.

In fighter technology, the performance capabilities were closer. The Yak 1 could compete on equal terms with the Bf 109E, while the LaGG-3 and MiG-3 were slower and less manoeuvrable. The Bf 109F held a significant flight performance advantage over Soviet fighters. In manoeuvrability terms, the Polikarpov I-153 and Polikarpov I-15 could outturn the Bf 109, while the Soviets had more experience in the use of air-to-air rockets.

== German intelligence ==
=== On Soviet industry ===
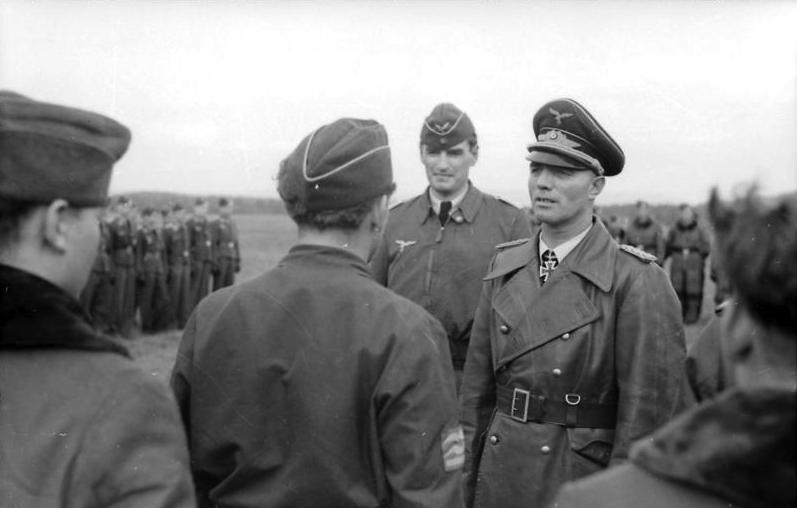
Joseph "Beppo" Schmid, the Luftwaffe's senior intelligence officer.

Before the Axis invasion of the USSR, Joseph "Beppo" Schmid, the Luftwaffe's senior intelligence officer, identified 7,300 aircraft in the VVS and long-range aviation in the western Soviet Union, when the actual figure was 7,850. However, Luftwaffe intelligence ignored the Soviet Navy with its 1,500 aircraft, as well as the air defence units (PVO), which had 1,445 aircraft. The Navy split their Western air forces between the three western fleets; 114 aircraft under the Arctic Fleet, 707 under the Baltic Red Banner Fleet, and 624 under the Black Sea Fleet. The number of aircraft that would face the Axis in the five (Leningrad, Baltic, Western, Kiev, and Odessa) border districts, out of 13 military districts in the west of the country, was 5,440 (1,688 bombers, 2,736 fighters, 336 close support aircraft, 252 reconnaissance, and 430 army-controlled) aircraft. Around 4,700 were considered to be combat aircraft, but only 2,850 were thought to be modern. Of this total, 1,360 bombers and reconnaissance aircraft and 1,490 fighters were combat-ready. Luftwaffe intelligence suggested that a ground support force of 150,000 ground- and aircrew and 15,000 pilots were available. The actual strength of the VVS in the western Soviet Union was 13,000 to 14,000 aircraft, as opposed to the 2,800 aircraft considered operational by the Luftwaffe. Schmid estimated that the Soviet air forces were not that strong, and that it would take a long time to build up their strength and deploy it to the western border areas. In fact, the VVS and Soviet aircraft supply was well-organised far behind the front.

OKL estimated that the Soviets possessed a workforce of 250,000, 50 fuselage/airframe factories, 15 aero engine factories, 40 factories building aircraft equipment and appliances, and 100 auxiliary factories. It was believed that the purges of the 1930s had severely affected the Soviet aeronautics industry, and that the Soviet Union did not possess the ability to copy foreign models, while lacking the electrometals required to do so. They based this largely on the fact that the Soviets were importing electrometals from Germany, as part of the Nazi-Soviet pact, August 1939. A report from 1938 concluded;

it seems doubtful the Soviet aircraft industry will be able to equipe the large air forces the Soviet command is endeavouring to establish....Soviet air power can no longer be rated as highly as it was two years ago.

The Luftwaffe had little intelligence on the VVS. Heinrich Aschenbrenner, the German air attache in Moscow was one of the few in the Nazi regime able to gain any clear insight into Soviet armaments potential, as a result of a visit to six aircraft plants in the Urals in the spring of 1941. His analysis was ignored by OKL. On the whole, German views of Soviet air power were still coloured by the impressions of German engineers and officers during their collaboration with the Soviet Union in the 1920s, and the poor performance of the VVS in the Winter War and Spanish Civil War.

The most serious omissions were in their underestimations related to the strategic sphere. OKL had vastly underestimated Soviet production capabilities. This reflected a lack of training of the German General Staff in strategic and economic warfare matters. Though a war of attrition and the realisation of total Soviet military potential was the worst-case scenario, it was left out of any planning considerations. The relationship between the civilian sector, Soviet air rearmament, and the morale of the Soviet people were also underestimated. Civilian requirements were considered too high for production to be efficient, and Soviet determination to restrict civilian needs in favour of the war effort was underrated. The Soviet ability to switch production to the Urals, a region which the Germans considered as underdeveloped, was critical to Soviet war materiel production. The Germans did not believe this to be possible. The Luftwaffe's assessment that the rail transport system was primitive also proved to be ill-founded. Reinforcements steadily reached the front during Barbarossa. Production itself was also underestimated. In 1939, the Soviet Union produced 2,000 more aircraft than Germany per year (Germany was producing just over 10,000). A monthly total of 3,500 to 4,000 aircraft were built by the Soviets; Schmid and Ernst Udet, the Luftwaffe's director of air armaments, gave figures of 600 per month, a serious underestimation. Production kept up with the destruction and the Axis capture of industrial regions, and surpassed German production by 3,000 in 1941, by producing 15,735 aircraft.

This was in part due to the German belief that the Soviets had insufficient fuel supplies, particularly oil, which would undermine Soviet armaments production. The energy resources (30 percent in the Ural-Volga region, 27 percent in Soviet Asia, and 43 percent in the Caucasus) were used to complete an enormous mechanisation program. The populations' use of fuels for lighting and general civilian needs, caused OKL to assume that the Red Army and VVS could only meet peacetime fuel allocations through restrictions. It was believed that this difficulty would continue for some time. German intelligence also had a dim view of Soviet logistical capabilities. It viewed the Soviet road and rail networks as incomplete, thus the supply of aviation fuel to the VVS on the frontline would be poor and would curtail Soviet air operations. It was also thought that the bulk of Soviet industry lay west of the Urals, and was thus vulnerable to capture anyway. Although aware that the Soviet Union intended to move 40 to 50 percent of its industry east of the Urals to continue production, the Germans viewed this plan as impossible to carry out. The Luftwaffe also vastly underestimated the Soviet ability to improvise.

One of crucial failures of the Luftwaffe was to underestimate the role of civil aviation on the Soviet Union. The Germans believed that it accounted for only 12 to 15 percent of all logistical traffic, and the nature of the Soviet terrain meant that rail was relied upon to deliver around 90 percent of Soviet supplies to the front, making it the prime target. The civil air organisation was deemed too primitive and ineffective. In wartime, it would contribute significantly to supporting logistics.

=== On Soviet field organisation ===
Intelligence correctly predicted that the VVS was in a state of reorganisation since April 1939, and that the restructuring was not yet complete. The OKL believed there to be 50 air divisions in reserve, and 38 air divisions and 162 regiments in the frontline. It was believed that Soviet ground attack aviation would be attached to and support the Army Fronts and strategic bomber and fighter forces would held back for air defence. In fact, Soviet sources indicated that 70 air divisions and five air brigades were in the front line in June 1941. Moreover, strategic bomber and fighter defence forces consisted of only 13.5 per cent of their strength and numbers 18 divisions (five fighter and 13 bomber). The ground support units made up 86.5 per cent of their force, and were contained in 63 divisions; nine bomber, 18 fighter and 34 mixed divisions. Another 25 divisions were being set up, and the number of regiments had increased by 80 per cent in the preceding two years.

The German intelligence on Soviet aircraft quality was mixed. Schmid rightly deduced that the VVS was technically inferior in aircraft quality operations and tactics, and would be on the eve of war. However, they underestimated the growth and ability of the Soviet Union to rearm with new, more capable aircraft. The OKL was completely unaware that over 2,739 aircraft including the most modern types had been produced and were in service. Although still lacking in some ways (only the I-16 and SB aircraft had self-sealing fuel tanks), 399 Yak 1, 1,309 MiG-3s, 322 LaGG-3 fighters, 460 Pe-2 bombers and 249 IL-2 ground attack aircraft were available. The OKL had assumed that re-equipment would be slow. Intelligence also believed the Soviets had 1,200 heavy and 1,200 light anti-aircraft artillery. The Soviets actually possessed 3,329 of the former and 3000 of the later, as well as 1,500 searchlights.

The organisation of Soviet operations was also considered poor. It was thought that the Soviet air forces did not possess communications. Only radio communications, which were operated by underskilled personnel, were operational. Communications existed with the VVS air staff, military districts, air divisions and bases, but not with the flying formations which only possessed RT and other telegraphy personnel. In critical situations it was believed radio traffic became overloaded, and the lack of airborne radio capability meant the VVS could not conduct flexible operations.

The OKL's view of Soviet landing grounds was also inaccurate. The Germans considered the underdeveloped nature of the airfields and lack of installations meant that units were exposed to the elements, and could not conduct effective operations from them. The better, or first class air bases, measured in comparison to the three German grades of airbase, were thought to house command staffs and their supply administrations. What mobile airfields the Soviets maintained, were thought to be inadequate because of supply difficulties. Of the 2,000 airfields in the western Soviet Union, just 200 were considered to be of use for bomber operations. In fact, over 250 had been extended, and 164 more main bases were constructed between 8 April and 15 July 1941. Not only was this taking place, but each air regiment was given its own main field, a reserve base and an emergency landing strip. It was also, by order of the Stavka, being separated from its rear organisations. The supply centres were to be organised on the forward airfields, enabling 36 air bases to operate in the western military districts and supply between two and four air divisions. This was carried out to ensure a high state of combat readiness.

=== Air reconnaissance ===
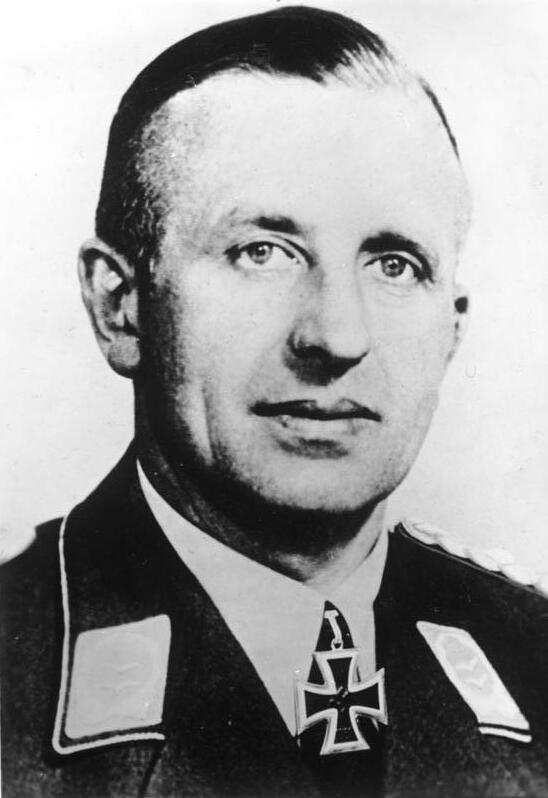
Theodor Rowehl

Extensive aerial intelligence flights were carried out on Soviet air bases after 21 September 1940. The main units involved were the high-altitude Junkers Ju 86, Heinkel He 111, and Dornier Do 217, which could fly so high as to be invulnerable to interception by Soviet fighters. In some cases, Soviet aviation was forbidden to try, as Stalin pursued a non-provocation policy. In the event, the Luftwaffe identified over 100 Soviet airfields between Murmansk and Rostov-on-Don. Around 500 flights, at altitudes of up to 36,500 ft (11,130 m) were carried out by Theodor Rowehl's reconnaissance group, Aufklärungsgruppe Oberbefehlshaber der Luftwaffe (AufklObdL). The flights continued until 15 June 1941, with special emphasis on airfields. Despite two Ju 86s being forced to land in the Soviet Union largely intact, with exposed cameras and film, Stalin did not register any protest. In the event, the AufklObdL and its intelligence played a vital role in the overwhelming initial success in the air.

The PVO and VVS leadership noted the flights heralded an imminent offensive, but Stalin ordered them not to interfere. He was paranoid about provoking the Germans. But when a Deutsche Lufthansa aircraft landed in Moscow without permission, Stalin grew concerned with his air force leaders. He ordered the arrest of General Pavel Rychagov, commander of the VVS and replaced him with Pavel Zhigarev. Rychagov was tortured then executed on 28 October 1941. At this point, the VVS had 1,100 airfields in the west, but just 200 were operational.

=== On Soviet combat capability ===
The view of Soviet fighter aircraft, namely the I-16, was positive. But the rest of the VVS' aircraft were deemed obsolete. However, the view formed of Soviet flying crews and operational personnel was not good. In the German view they lacked General Staff training and operational procedure was cumbersome, though they managed to offset some weaknesses by skilful improvisation. Operations were deemed to be lacking in flexibility in attack and defence and they suffered heavy losses for it. Aircrews were considered brave and eager defending their own territory, but showed a lack of fighting spirit over enemy territory. Outstanding pilots were the exception, rather than the norm. Training of Soviet pilots in formation flying was poor, as it was in bombers. Anti-aircraft units showed increased progress but the Luftwaffe saw serious shortcomings in air-to-air and air-land communication.

Because of the scarcity of information on the Soviet armed forces, too much reliance was placed on Russian emigres and German repatriated, especially as their attitude was one more in line with Nazi ideology; a strong belief in German cultural superiority and the National Socialist thesis of Germanic racial superiority. The view formed of the Slavic peoples, hammered into the Wehrmacht by Nazi propaganda, prevented the Luftwaffe forming a realistic judgement of Soviet air forces. Even the usually sound and objective Major General Hoffmann von Waldau, chief of the operations staff commented on the Soviets as a "state of most centralised executive power and below-average intelligence". Perhaps the best summation of German attitudes to intelligence were best summed up by the Chief of the General Staff, Hans Jeschonnek, uttered to Aschenbrenner in a bid to maintain the two country's relations while the Wehrmacht was engaged in the west; "Establish the best possible relations with the Soviet Union and to not bother about intelligence gathering".

=== In general ===
The Luftwaffe's general picture of the VVS was entirely correct in many aspects in the military field; this was later confirmed in the early stages of Barbarossa and in post-war British and American studies, and also in the Eastern Bloc. Soviet sources confirm that the VVS was in a state of reorganisation before the attack, and were retraining on modern machines which made it unready for a major conflict. The deductions about Soviet tactical-operational limitations were to a large degree, accurate. In aircraft types, equipment and training, ground organisation, supply system at the operational level, the dispersal of effort and the operational commands immobility, gave the impression of an air force with limited striking power.

On the other hand, there was a systematic failure to appreciate the level of pre-war education in the Soviet military. The ability of the Soviets to improvise and compensate for disorganisation in logistics offset their failings. Extensive use of camouflage and all arms defence against air attack made the Soviets tenacious on the defensive. There was, on the German side, a failure to realise that the unfavourable ratio of Soviet air power to the vastness of territory applied even more so to the numerically weaker Luftwaffe.

== Soviet Air Forces ==
=== Supporting industry ===
Soviet aviation was heavily supported by a large industry. Hitler had forbidden air reconnaissance flights deep into the Soviet Union until shortly before the beginning of Barbarossa, and the Luftwaffe did not possess the aircraft with the range to be able to reach the Ural factories to see how vast Soviet industry was. Shortly before the invasion, German engineers were given a guided tour of Soviet industrial complexes and aircraft factories in the Urals from 7 to 16 April, and evidence of extensive production was already underway. Their reports to the OKW went unheeded.

Lead engineer and military air attaché, Oberst Heinrich Aschenbrenner, sent a stark warning that Soviet production was more sophisticated and advanced than first assumed. Hitler's reaction was to speed up preparations; "You see how far these people are already. We must begin immediately". Hermann Göring was told by the experts, from Daimler-Benz, Henschel and Mauser that one aero engine factory in the Moscow region was six times larger than six of Germany's largest factories put together. Göring was furious with the report, and dismissed it. He believed they had fallen for a Soviet bluff. Intelligence reports regarded as negative by the OKL were usually dismissed. In particular, Aschenbrenner listed some warnings that German intelligence had not picked up:

The consolidated report of the visit stressed among than other things: (1) that the factories were completely independent of subsidiary part deliveries (2) the excellently arranged work --- extending down to details [production methods], (3) the well maintained modern machinery, and (4) the technical manual aptitude, devotion frugality of Soviet workers. Other remarkable features were that up to 50 per cent of the workers were women, who were employed at work, performed [had work experience] in other countries exclusively by highly qualified personnel, and that the finished products were of an excellent quality.

Even though it maybe assumed the best factories were shown, the conclusion may also be drawn that other Soviet factories were also capable of the same standards.

Soviet industry was highly productive, and on the eve of Barbarossa, possessed at least 9,576 frontline aircraft which made it the largest air force in the World. However, its equipment, like that of the Red Army, was largely obsolescent and suffering from prolonged use. The Great Purges had also hit aircraft manufacturers, and the loss of personnel ended the Soviet lead in aircraft design and aeronautics. At least one designer was shot for a charge of sabotage on the crash of an aircraft, and many designers were sent to Gulags. Indeed, the Head of the VVS, Yakov Alksnis was shot and 400 to 500 aero engineers were arrested from the Commissariat of Aviation Industry. Some 70 were shot and 100 died in forced labour camps. The others were later put into prison workshops, and allowed to continue their work. The aviation industry was disrupted, severely, and while the damage caused was later patched up in 1941, months of idleness and disorganisation contributed to the disasters in 1941.

While numerically the strongest air force in the world, the VVS was an imbalanced force in comparison to the British, Americans and Germans at the time of Barbarossa. It relied on too few established designers and an over-centralised system which produced aircraft that fell behind the standards of most powers. The VVS was also profoundly influenced by Giulio Douhet, and the theory of air power that was focused on the offensive, and bombing the enemy heartland. It was overloaded with inadequately designed bombers, which were expected to survive in combat. In 1938 production of light and strike aircraft as well as fighters was to be cut in two to allow for more bomber aircraft to be produced.

=== Training, equipment and purges ===
The purges affected the leadership of the VVS. In June 1941, 91 per cent of major formation leaders had been in place for just six months. With the exception of Major General Aleksandr Novikov, commanding the Leningrad District, most would fail in their posts and pay for that failure with their lives. A critical operational omission of the VVS was the failure to disperse its aircraft. Soviet aircraft was left closely 'bunched' into groups, and lined up on airfields, making a very easy target for the Germans.

Soviet training left much to be desired. Stalin's purges had deprived the VVS of its senior and best commanders. It heralded a debilitating decline in military effectiveness. In light of the Winter War and the German victory in the French Campaign, the Soviet leadership panicked and Stalin ordered a hasty overhaul of the armed forces. Order 0362, 22 December 1940, of the People's Commissar Defence ordered the accelerated training program for pilots which meant the cutting of training time. The program had already been cut owing to an earlier defence order, 008, dated 14 March 1940. It put an end to the flight training for volunteers, and instituted mass drafts. In February 1941, pilot training was cut further leading to a disastrous drop in the quality of pilot training prior to Barbarossa.

The officer corps was decimated in the Great Purge and operational level effectiveness suffered. The 6,000 officers lost and then the subsequent massive expansion schemes, which increased the number of personnel from 1.5 million in 1938 to five million in 1941 flooded the VVS with inexperienced personnel and the infrastructure struggled to cope. It still left the VVS short of 60,000 qualified officers in 1941. Despite the expansion of flight schools from 12 to 83 from 1937 to June 1941, the schools lacked half their flight instructors and half of their allotted fuel supplies. Combined with these events, training was shortened a total of seven times in 1939–1940. The attrition and loss of experienced pilots in Barbarossa encouraged a culture of rapid promotion to positions beyond some pilots' level of competence. It created severe operational difficulties for the VVS.

The process of modernisation in the VVS' frontline strength had started to gain pace and strength. The Polikarpov I-16 fighter and Tupolev SB bomber were rapidly being replaced by more capable and modern aircraft. In 1941, the Ilyushin Il-2, Yakovlev Yak-1, Lavochkin-Gorbunov-Gudkov LaGG-3, Petlyakov Pe-2 and Mikoyan-Gurevich MiG-3 were in production, comparable to foreign analogues. However, only 37 Mikoyan-Gurevich MiG-1 and 201 MiG-3s were operational on 22 June, and only four pilots had been trained to fly them. The attempt to familiarise pilots with these types resulted in the loss of 141 pilots killed and 138 aircraft written off in accidents in the first quarter of 1941 alone. On 31 August, the first foreign aircraft arrived. The Curtiss P-40 Warhawk was among those handed over but the Soviets did not have Russian-language manuals. The type was evaluated and made it into operations in September/October 1941.

Even the most pessimistic German intelligence reports believed, regardless of the numerical superiority of the VVS, the Luftwaffe would be dominant over the battlefield owing to technical and tactical advantages. Air attacks on German ground forces were not considered to be possible, while the Luftwaffe would prove decisive in the role.

== Luftwaffe assignments ==
=== Luftflotte 4 ===
Fliegerkorps V was to support the First Panzer Army and the German Seventeenth Army and German Sixth Army in their quest to capture Kiev and Rostov on an initial front of 215 miles. Rostov was 950 miles from its base at Kraków. Fliegerkorps IV operated on a 350-mile front supporting the German Eleventh Army, Third Romanian Army and Fourth Romanian Army pushing into Ukraine to conquer Crimea, on the Black Sea.

The units committed to the Air Fleet were both medium bomber and fighters. Fliegerkorps V under Greim had Kampfgeschwader 51 (KG 51), Kampfgeschwader 55 (KG 55) and I., and II., Kampfgeschwader 54 (KG 54). It was given the complete fighter wing Jagdgeschwader 3 (JG 3). Kurt Pflugbeil and Fliegerkorps IV contained, II./ Kampfgeschwader 4 (KG 4), Kampfgeschwader 27, KG 27, II., III., Jagdgeschwader 77 (JG 77) and I.(J)/Lehrgeschwader 2 (Learning Wing 2). The Deutsche Luftwaffenmission Rumanien (German Air Force Mission Romania) under Hans Speidel had Stab., and III./Jagdgeschwader 52 (JG 52). Luftgaukommando (Air District Command) VIII under Bernhard Waber acted as a reserve. Luftgaukommando XVII under General der Flakartillerie Friedrich Hirschauer was also attached as a reserve. Luftflotte 4 was to coordinate with the Romanian Air Force, though the later was considered independent to the Luftwaffe.

=== Luftflotte 2 ===
Supporting Army Group Centre's advance on Moscow was, initially, considered the most important objective. Fliegerkorps II and VIII were given the best ground attack units, particularly the former, commanded by von Richthofen. Loerzer's Corps was to support the German Fourth Army and Second Panzer Army on the left of the Army Group's flank. Richthofen supported the Third Panzer Army on the right. The Luftwaffe's front was only 186 miles long, but stretched 680 miles deep. The 1st AA Corps was to help break down border fortresses.

Under Kesselring, the Luftwaffe contained IV./K.Gr.z.b.V. 1, a transport unit with Junkers Ju 52s and Dornier Do 217 for its command headquarters. Fliegerkorps VIII under Richthofen possessed I, and III.,/ Jagdgeschwader 53 (JG 53, Fighter Wing 53), and 2.(F)./122, which was equipped with Ju 88s, Do 17s, Bf 110s and He 111s. II., III., Jagdgeschwader 27 (JG 27, Fighter Wing 27), II./Jagdgeschwader 52 (JG 52), I., and II., Zerstörergeschwader 26 (ZG 26, Destroyer Wing 26), II.(S). and 10.(S)./Lehrgeschwader 2 (Learning Wing 2). I, Kampfgeschwader 2 and III Kampfgeschwader 3 with Do 17s were also used for ground support, as was I., III./Sturzkampfgeschwader 1 (StG 1, Dive Bombing Wing 1) and I., III./Sturzkampfgeschwader 2 (StG 2) with Ju 87s.

Bruno Loerzer's Fliegerkorps II was equipped with Staffeln from I., 11., III., IV., Jagdgeschwader 51 (JG 51), I., and II., SKG 210, I., II., KG 3, I., II., III., Kampfgeschwader 53 (KG 53), and I., II., III./Sturzkampfgeschwader 77 (StG 77).

=== Luftflotte 1 ===
Army Group North's advance on Leningrad was supported by Fliegerkorps I. Advancing from East Prussia it was to support the German Sixteenth Army, German Eighteenth Army and Fourth Panzer Army on the left of the Army Group's flank. Richthofen supported the Third Panzer Army on the right. The Luftwaffe's front was only 125 miles long, but stretched 528 miles deep. It was also assigned to dealing with the Soviet Baltic Sea Fleet.

Under Alfred Keller, the Luftwaffe contained K.Gr.z.b.V. 106, a transport unit with Junkers Ju 52s and Dornier Do 217 for its command headquarters. Helmuth Förster and Fliegerkorps I, was equipped with Staffeln from Jagdgeschwader 53 (JG 53, Fighter Wing), all of Jagdgeschwader 54 (JG 54), Kampfgeschwader 1 (KG 1, Bomber Wing 1), Kampfgeschwader 76 (KG 76) and Kampfgeschwader 77 (KG 77). Fliegerführer Ostsee (Flying Leader East Sea) under the command of Wolfgang von Wild, operated Ju 88s and Heinkel He 115 and Heinkel He 59 floatplanes. Luftgaukommando I, under Richard Putzier was the Luftflotten reserve.

=== Luftflotte 5 ===
Commanded by Hans-Jürgen Stumpff, its main goal was the disruption of Soviet road and rail traffic to and from Leningrad – Murmansk, and the interdiction of shipping in the later port, which was bringing in American equipment across the Atlantic Ocean. The Air Fleet was equipped with 240 aircraft. 1 Staffel JG 77, Stab/Zerstörergeschwader 76 (ZG 76, Destroyer Wing 76), II.(S). and IV.(Stuka)./Lehrgeschwader 1 (LG 1, Learning Wing 1). 5./Kampfgeschwader 30 (KG 30) [single staffel] and I./Kampfgeschwader 26 (KG 26).

== Battle ==
=== Luftflotte 2, first encirclement battles ===
For the first eight days, the Axis put Soviet air bases under intense pressure in a bid to exterminate their air forces while providing the close support demanded by the army. Fedor Kuznetsov, commander of the North-Western Front (Baltic Military District) ordered the large 3rd, 12th and 23rd Mechanised Corps to counterattack the advance of Army Group North. Luftflotte 1's KG 76 and 77 inflicted heavy losses on these columns. It is known the 12th Mechanised Corps lost 40 tanks and vehicles to air assaults. A lack of specialised close support aircraft forced the Germans deployed the Ju 88 in the role, and lost 22 of them in action.

The air attacks on the previous day had reduced the effectiveness of the VVS North-Western Front. They sent unescorted bombers which suffered heavily without fighter escort, which was absent owing to losses in the opening air strikes. Elsewhere, the Luftwaffe helped breakdown Soviet resistance. Wolfram Freiherr von Richthofen's Fliegerkorps VIII operated unopposed in the air destroyed large amounts of Soviet ground targets. On 24 June, a Soviet counterattack at Grodno was defeated, and VVS forces from 13 BAD lost 64 SBs and 18 DB-3s against JG 51; that same day, 557 Soviet aircraft were lost overall. In the first three days, the Germans claimed 3,000 Soviet aircraft destroyed. Soviet figures put this higher; at 3,922. Luftwaffe losses were 70 (40 destroyed) on 24 June. The Soviet attack lost 105 tanks to air attacks. Soviet sources acknowledged the lack of coordination between ground and air forces was poor, and that Soviet fighters failed to protect the ground forces which "suffered serious losses from enemy bomber attacks".

The Luftwaffe delivered a series of destructive air raids on Minsk, and rendered good support to the Second Panzer Army. Soviet fighter aviation achieved some success, being held back from fighter escort duties to cover the industrial cities. Soviet bombers tried in vain to destroy German airfields to relieve the pressure. In two notable battles, typical of the campaign, the 57th Mixed Aviation Division lost 56 aircraft on the ground and a further 53 bombers were lost against JG 27 and 53. JG 51 claimed 70 on 25 June, while the Luftwaffe claimed 351.

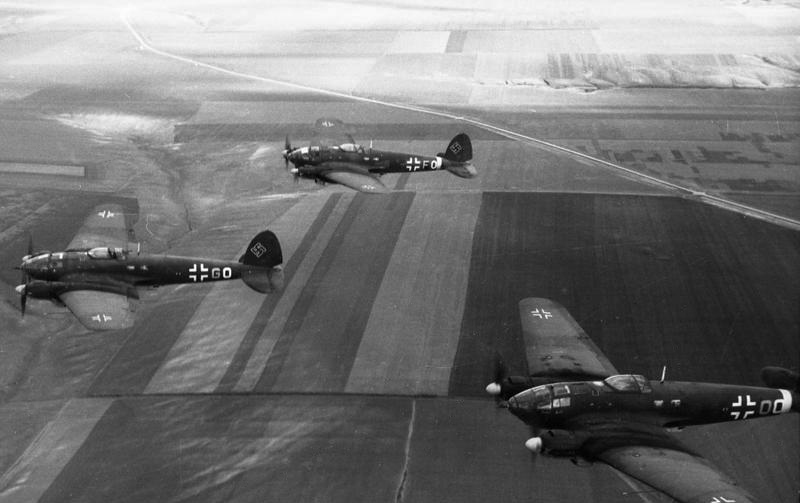
Heinkel He 111s over the Soviet Union, 1941.

The Luftwaffe also flew support for the ground forces, with Richthofen's Fliegerkorps VIII flying valuable support missions. The Soviet 4th Army under Pavlov Kobrin had its headquarters destroyed near Brest-Litovsk by Ju 87s from StG 77. The fortress in Brest-Litovsk was destroyed by an 1800 SC Satan bomb, dropped by KG 3. The German Army struggled to maintain the pockets when it did succeed in encircling Soviet formations. Often, the Red Army broke out at night, through gaps. In the day, small groups broke out, avoiding roads and obvious routes. The Luftwaffe failed to interdict because reconnaissance aircraft warned the Soviets. Richthofen developed ad hoc tactics; armed reconnaissance. His commanding officer, Kesselring, ordered Luftflotte 2 to fly armed reconnaissance missions, using bombers and Henschel Hs 123s from LG 2, to suppress the Soviet ground forces being encircled by the Second and Third Panzer Armies. The Red Army eased German operations by failing to utilise radios and relying on telephone lines, which had been damaged by air attacks, causing communicative chaos. Dmitriy Pavlov, commander of the Western Front, could not locate his units. Nevertheless, Red Army's standing instructions to fire with all weapons on close support aircraft caused a rise in German losses. Luftflotte carries out 458 sorties on 28 June, half that of 26 June. On 29 June just 290 sorties were flown. The proximity of German forward airfields prevented even more aircraft being lost.

Entire Soviet armies had been surrounded in the Battle of Białystok–Minsk. Kesselring, Loerzer and Richthofen concentrated on supply centres in the Minsk and Orsha region. Disrupting communications prevented the Soviets from relieving the pocket. Pavlov and his staff were summoned to Moscow and then shot on July 22. Semyon Timoshenko replaced him. By the end of June, an all out effort was made by the VVS Western Front to stop further Axis progress. The 3rd Bomber Aviation Corps, 42nd, 47th and 52nd Long-Range Aviation Division and the TB-3 equipped 1st and 3rd Heavy Bomber Aviation Regiment, long-range aviation, struck at German positions at low-level to prevent them crossing the river Berezina at Bobruysk. The result was carnage. German Flak units and fighters from JG 51 decimated the formations. It was a disastrous air battle for the Soviets, which cost them, according to German claims, 146 aircraft. After this, the VVS Western Front could muster only 374 bombers and 124 fighters on 1 July, from a force of 1,789 ten days earlier. On a more positive note, the VVS' 4th Attack Aviation Regiment saw action in June; it was equipped with the Ilyushin Il-2 Shturmovik, and although only trained to land and take off in them, their crews were thrown into the fight. German fighter pilots were shocked by the effectiveness of their heavy armour, which deflected their fire. Still, the regiment lost 20 crews killed in these battles from a force of 249.

The Białystok pocket fell on 1 July and the two Panzer Armies pushed on towards another pocket, west of Minsk. Luftflotte 2 supported the armoured columns in relays and helped encircle four more Soviet armies near the city. Fliegerkorps VIII provided considerable support, as it was equipped for the task. Bruno Loerzer's Fliegerkorps II was not achieving as much success, supporting Heinz Guderian's Second Panzer Army south of Minsk. Logistics were stretched and Loerzer could not direct their bomber and long-range reconnaissance units which were further to the rear. The Panzers had outrun its air support. However, to ensure seamless cooperation from close support aircraft based within 100 km from the front, Major General Martin Fiebig, chief of staff for Fliegerkorps VIII, was established as Close Support Leader II (Nahkampfführer II). It was an ad hoc group, which allowed Fiebig to take command of Fliegerkorps II's close support units, SKG 210 and JG 51, supporting the Second Panzer Army. Guderian, though not always in agreement with Fiebig's methods, was grateful for the quality of air support. The German army became spoiled with the level of air support, and wanted air power to support operations everywhere. Von Richthofen maintained that the Luftwaffe should be held back, and used in concentration for operational, not tactical effect. In the event, Fiebig had been operating without radios for the most part, and friendly-fire incidents were avoided by the use of signal panels and flags. In operational terms, the Luftwaffe, and in particular Richthofen, had performed well. Using the Flivos, forward radio liaison officers, the mechanised divisions could summon air support very quickly, usually after a two-hour wait.

The Luftwaffe did particular damage to Soviet railways, which Soviet doctrine relied on, aiding the Axis armies. Although one major supply bridge at Bobruysk was knocked out, 1,000 Soviet workers repaired in 24–36 hours, showing Soviet resolve. The Soviet Union was too open for attacks on road intersections to have much effect on preventing supplies reaching the line, or enemy units retreating, so bridges were focused on. The Luftwaffe continually attacked Soviet airfields around Smolensk and Polotsk. Gomel also received special attention. Luftwaffe interdiction against Soviet communications was also considerable. General Franz Halder noted: "The number of track sections occupied with standing trains is increasing satisfactorily". In the event, 287,000 prisoners were taken in the Minsk operation.

Kesselring's Luftflotte 2 had destroyed the VVS Western Front by early July. Over 1,000 air victories were filed by German pilots, while another 1,700 were claimed on the ground. Soviet sources admit to 1,669 losses in the air, between 22 and 30 June. In the same period the Soviets claimed 662 German aircraft (613 in the air and 49 on the ground). German losses were 699 aircraft. Some 480 were due to enemy action (276 destroyed and 208 damaged). After only slightly more than a week of fighting, the Luftflotten at the front saw their strength drop to 960 aircraft. In total the VVS suffered 4,614 destroyed (1,438 in the air and 3,176 on the ground) by 30 June. By the end of the fighting in the border areas on 12 July, the Soviet casualties had risen to 6,857 aircraft destroyed against 550 German losses, plus another 336 damaged.

The disasters of the VVS were largely down to two reasons; the better tactics used by the Luftwaffe and the lack of communications between Soviet pilots. The Luftwaffe used Rotte (or pairs) which relied on wingman-leader tactics. The two flew 200 metres apart, each covering the others blind spot. In combat the leader engaged while the wingman protected his tail. Two Rotte made up a Schwarm (section) and three Schwarme made up a Staffel in stepped up line astern formation. It allowed the formation to focus in looking for the enemy rather than keeping formation. Soviet aircraft fought with little regard for formation tactics, usually along or in pairs without tactical coordination. The lack of radios in aircraft made coordination worse. When the Soviets did use formation methods, the German Finger-four was much better than the Soviet V formation.

=== VVS North-Western Front vs Luftflotte 1 ===
Aleksey Ionov and his VVS North-Western Front had avoided the near destruction of the VVS Western Front, but at the cost of conceding much territory. Alfred Keller's Luftflotte 1 had defeated the attempted Soviet counterattack in Lithuania, then the Fourth Panzer Army and Erich von Manstein's LVI Panzerkorps outflanked the Red Army, reaching Daugavpils on 26 June, and advance of 240 kilometres in four days. It was nearly the case, as much of its forces had been largely destroyed. A number of Soviet aircraft had been abandoned, as was seen on 25 June, when III./JG 54 occupied the airfield near Kaunas found 86 undamaged Soviet aircraft, the remains of 8th Mixed Aviation Division. Luftflotte 1 controlled the skies over the battlefields. The VVS forces had lost 425 aircraft in the air and 465 on the ground in the first eight days. Another 187 had sustained battle damage. Out of 403 SB bombers available on 22 June, 205 had been shot down, 148 lost on the ground, and 33 damaged by 30 June. Fighter losses included 110 I-153s, 81 I-16s, and 17 MiG-3s. A problem faced by the Luftflotte was that it lacked close support aircraft, and was forced to use medium bombers in the role.

Unable to summon adequate forces, Ionov turned to the VVS KBF, the air force of the Red Banner Baltic Fleet. The plan revolved around a massive air strike, at the bridges in Daugavpils and the airfield, occupied by JG 54 at Duagava. The Soviets had not learned the tactical lessons from the previous air battles and sent their bombers unescorted. 8 BAB, 1MTAP, 57th Bomber Aviation Regiment, and 73rd Bomber Aviation Regiment were intercepted en route. Further attack by 36 bombers from 57th and 73rd Bomber Aviation Regiments was also intercepted. Another attack was made in the evening of 30 June. The 57th and 73rd Bomber Aviation Regiments also fought in the battles. The day cost the Soviets 22 destroyed and six damaged. Ivonov was placed under arrest. His successor, Timofey Kutsevalov took command of the remnants of the VVS North-Western Front, but it had ceased to be a force to be reckoned with. The VVS KBF now assumed responsibility for most air operations.

As Kutsevalov assumed command of the VVS North-Western Front, Nikolai Fyodorovich Vatutin assumed command of Northwestern Front, Red Army. On the first day of his command, he threw the 21st Mechanised Corps into action at Duagavpils to recapture the bridgehead. Despite the lack of close support aircraft, which was eased with the arrival of 40 Bf 110s from ZG 26, Luftflotte 1 delivered a series of air attacks, which accounted for around 250 Soviet tanks. After the attack, the Fourth Panzer Army launched an attack across the Daugava River. The state of the VVS North-Western Front meant Aleksandr Novikov's Northern Front became responsible for operations in the Baltic. It had escaped damage, owing to its assignment in the far north, near Murmansk. However, when the Panzer Army began a breakout of the bridgehead, heavy rain prevented large-scale air operations. When the weather cleared, the Soviet committed unescorted bombers from 2nd Mixed Aviation Division, but lost 28 to JG 54.

With air superiority Luftflotte 1's KG 1, KG 76 and KG 77 interdicted Soviet communications, slowing down the Soviet ground forces, who failed to reach the area before the Germans broke out. Fliegerkorps I in particular contributed to the success, and the Panzers met only weak opposition. Some Soviet aerial resurgence was seen on 5 July, but the threat was dealt with and 112 Soviet aircraft were destroyed on the ground. A soviet counterattack still occurred, and wiped out a forward advance party of the 1st Panzer Division. Again, the Luftwaffe interdicted and the three bomber groups flew ground support missions at Ostrov, cutting off all supply lines to the city and destroyed 140 Soviet tanks for two bombers lost. More Soviet air strikes against the spearheads were repulsed with high losses.

On 7 July, Soviet aviation did play an important role in slowing the German advance and forcing the Fourth Panzer Army's advance north east, to Leningrad, to stop. They succeeded in getting among German troop and vehicle concentrations and spreading havoc on the congested bridges at the Velikaya River. But they did so at a dreadful price, and lost 42 bombers to JG 54. Between 1 and 10 July, the VVS flew 1,200 sorties and dropped 500 tons of bombs. Army Group North reported heavy losses in equipment. Specifically the 1st Panzer Division noted these losses were caused by air attack. Franz Landgraf, commanding the 6th Panzer Division, reported particularly high losses. However, while some units had nearly been wiped out (2nd and 41st Mixed Aviation Division had lost 60 bombers), they prevented the Fourth Panzer Army from reaching Leningrad before the Red Army had prepared suitable defences; it is unlikely that the Red Army could have prevented them from doing so without the intervention of the VVS.

The Soviets were now over the most critical phase. Novikov now drew the conclusion that Soviet air forces could be effective by instituting changes. All bombers were to be escorted, Soviet fighter pilots were encouraged to be more aggressive and take part in low-level suppression attacks, and more night strikes owing to an absence of German night fighter forces would be less costly. Soviet forces did increase their effectiveness: Despite Loerzer's Corps claiming 487 Soviet aircraft destroyed in the air and 1,211 on the ground between 22 June and 13 July, aerial resistance was clearly mounting. On 13 July, Army Group North counted 354 Soviet machines in the skies. All this compelled the Luftwaffe to return to bombing airfields. Of particular concern was the taran tactic—the VVS carried out 60 of these attacks in July.

In mid-July, the battered Fourth Panzer Army reached the Luga River, 96 kilometres south of Leningrad. The Germans closed on Lake Ilmen also. At this point, Army Group North was subjected to the heaviest air attacks thus far. Novikov had concentrated 235 bombers from the North and North-Western Front. It supported an offensive by Alexsandr Matveyev's Soviet 11th Army on 14 July. Flying 1,500 sorties, they helped push back the Germans 40 kilometres and inflict heavy losses on the 8th Panzer Division. The Luftwaffe struggled to be effective because of logistical problems: the only supply road from Pskov to Gdov was impossible to use owing to scattered attacks by Soviet forces. Instead, the Ju 52 transports had to bring in supplies by air, which remained the case until mid-August. Unable to support the Army Group any further, fast moving operations ended and the battles became slow and attrition based. Army Group North had scored an operational victory, by advancing and securing the Baltic states, but failed to capture Leningrad or destroy the Red Army's North-Western Front. By the end of July 1941, the VVS had flown 16,567 sorties in support of the ground forces.

=== Stalemate at Kiev ===
Simultaneous operations were begun against Yevgebiy Ptukhin's VVS KOVO (Kiev) South-Western Front. Alexander Löhr's Luftflotte 4 supported Gerd von Rundstedt's Army Group South which was to capture Kiev and conquer Ukraine. The Southwestern Front, Red Army was quick to react, destroying bridges along the River Bug. The Germans prepared pontoon bridges, and the VVS South West tried to halt the Axis crossing points. The Soviets claimed to have cause havoc among the advancing Germans but 2nd and 4th Bomber Aviation Corps suffered significant losses against Kurt Pflugbeil's Fliegerkorps IV. JG 3 were particularly successful, shooting down 18 bombers on 23 June. Although the Luftwaffe acknowledged that the VVS KOVO offered it the strongest resistance in June 1941, it did not save Ptukhin, who was arrested on 24 June and shot in February 1942. Indeed, the air battles had been costly for Luftflotte 4 and German Army reconnaissance units, which lost 92 aircraft (55 written off) from 22 to 25 June. In return, they flew 1,600 sorties against 77 Soviet airbases, and destroyed 774 Soviet aircraft on the ground and 89 in the air. When the Soviet 8th Mechanised Corps resumed an attack against the First Panzer Army, support for the Corps resulted in 22 German aircraft being shot down. Fliegerkorps IV's losses represented the lion's share of otherwise moderate German losses to date.

Fliegerkorps V received critical help from the Royal Hungarian Air Force (Magyar Királyi Honvéd Légierőthe). It consisted of 530, mostly obsolete combat aircraft, including 86 German Ju 86 and Italian Caproni Ca.135. It supported Pflugbeil's Corps in support of the First Panzer Army which was struggling against the Southwestern Front. Both Axis aviation groups played a decisive role in ground support operations. Attacks of the 15th Mechanised Corps destroyed 201 tanks by 30 June causing the Southwestern Front to withdraw. A Soviet counterattack on 1 July was routed by Fliegerkorps IV. On that day 220 motor vehicles and 40 tanks were knocked out by KG 51, KG 54 and KG 55. But losses were high; KG 55 lost 24 He 111s and another 22 damaged; KG 51's strength dropped by one-third, while KG 54 lost 16 Ju 88s put out of action. Nevertheless, air superiority was won, and Soviet rail and road communications were interdicted. The First Panzer Army achieved a breakthrough at Polonnoye-Shepetovka on 5 July while Pflugbeil's Fliegerkorps V assisted, destroyed 18 supply trains and 500 wagons. However, the battles resulted in heavy attrition with both German and Soviet units being withdrawn. At heavy cost, constant air attacks brought the First Panzer Army's advance to a halt. The Luftwaffe noted that the Soviets used their aviation to gain time, while the Red Army established a defence at Kiev.

Further south the Romanian Third Army and German Eleventh Army advanced toward Mogilev-Podilskyi on the Dniestr river and towards Chernovsty in the north. Axis aviation performed well. On 7 July III./KG 27 claimed 70 lorries destroyed while Axis fighters inflicted heavy losses to the VVS South-Western Front. The VVS managed, on rare occasion to catch the Luftwaffe on the ground. 55th Fighter Aviation Regiment knocked out 11 Ju 87s from StG 77 in this regard on 12 July. However, the battle for Moldavia ended that same day. The Romanians had lost 22,765 men (10,439 killed and 12,326 wounded). Its air force had flown 5,100 sorties and shot down 88 Soviet aircraft for 58 losses. JG 77 claimed 130 destroyed in the same period. The Soviet Air Forces admitted 204 losses, but it may have been higher. Its strength fell from 826 non-serviceable to 358, a decrease of 468. German losses amounted to 31 destroyed and 30 damaged.

=== Luftflotte 2 over Smolensk ===
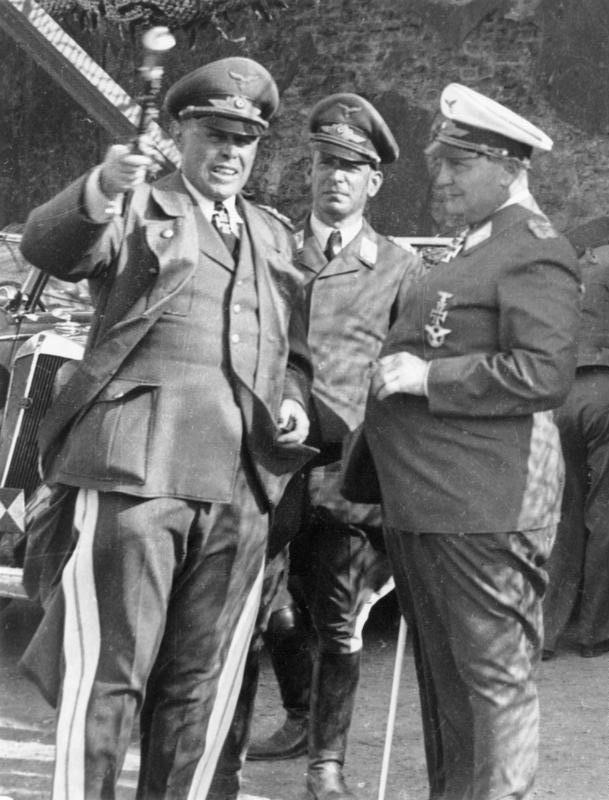
Kesselring (left), with his chief of staff, Wilhelm Speidel (centre), and Hermann Göring (right)

The victory at Białystok–Minsk was the first of two major encirclements for Army Group Centre. The second took place in the Battle for Smolensk. On 9 July the Third Panzer Army captured Vitebsk. For the Smolensk-Orsha operation Fiebig's Close Support Command II provided direct ground support, Fliegerkorps VIII, focused on the northern part of the front, while Loerzer's Fliegerkorps II focused on the Soviet rear areas.

During the first five days of July 1941, Luftflotte2 logged 2,019 sorties and destroyed 353 Soviet aircraft for 41 losses and 12 damaged. On 5 July 183 Soviet aircraft were destroyed on the ground, by Do 17s from III./KG 2 and III./KG 3. Soviet reinforcements still poured in; the 46th Mixed Aviation Division and its IL-2s from 61st, 215th and 430th Attack Aviation Regiment, which had been kept in reserve, began operations. They attacked XXXXVII Panzerkorps. One IL-2, flown by Nikolai Malyshev of the 430th Attack Aviation Regiment, took 200 hits and remained in the air. The ground-attack aircraft caused enough damage to delay the German attack. Meanwhile, German aviation also proved decisive. West of Orsha, the 17th Panzer Division was surrounded by a counterattack on 8 July, and Ju 87s from StG 1, transferred from Fliegerkorps VIII, helped the division breakout. On 11 July Luftflotte 2 helped Guderian's Second Panzer Army across of the Dniepr, contributing 1,048 sorties. Soon afterwards, the 10th Panzer Division encircled the Soviet 13th Army's 12th Mechanised and 61st Rifle Corps by capturing Gorky. Soviet aviation concentrated on the Germans and wiped out an SS Regiment. The front became confused, with large Red Army forces moving east to escape Guderian, and powerful concentrations moving forward to block it. The Luftwaffe concentrated on both streams. Soviet aviation was continually in the air and opposing German air attacks. On 16 July, a major effort of 615 sorties against the Soviet 21st Army in the Bobruysk area, claiming 14 tanks, 514 trucks, nine artillery and two anti-aircraft guns. By 17 July, the 16th and 20th Soviet armies were surrounded at Smolensk and the Soviet 21st Army near Orsha and Mogilev. However, plentiful air support encouraged the German army units to become reluctant in advancing without air cover. German forces became inclined to retreat if the Luftwaffe was not present in strength. The army complained air liaison was not effective enough. Commander of Fliegerkorps VIII, von Richthofen, argued that it took time to organise sorties.

The Southwestern Front Red Army, and the South-Western Front, VVS, had suffered heavily and the three armies were effectively destroyed. But their delaying strategy tied down German forces for a month. They even succeeded in pushing back the 10th Panzer to Yelnya. The VVS, having suffered terrible losses, was now in a position of numerical and qualitative inferiority. The Germans outnumbered the Soviets five to one in tanks, and two to one in artillery, but also two to one in serviceable aircraft. On 20 July the VVS KOVO had only 389 aircraft (103 fighters 286 bombers). The effectiveness of German fighter units, particularly JG 51, saw the new Pe-2 units nearly wiped out. The 410th Bomber Aviation Regiment lost 33 out of 38 bombers it had brought with it on 5 July. The IL-2 equipped 4th Attack Aviation Regiment had only 10 of the 65 aircraft after just three weeks. The Soviets had cleverly concentrated their air power at Yelnya, and the mixture of a decline in Luftwaffe strength (to 600 in the central sector) compelled the Germans to withdraw from the salient.

The tired German Fourth Army and German Ninth Army closed the pocket around Smolensk. SKG 210, the Bf 110-equipped close support unit destroyed or knocked out 165 tanks, 2,136 motor vehicles, 194 artillery, 52 trains and 60 locomotives with wagons. In the campaign since 22 June, it had accounted for 915 Soviet aircraft, 823 on the ground. Still, some 100,000 Red Army soldiers escaped by Kesselring's estimate. Most escaped at night, which showed even when the Luftwaffe had air superiority, it lacked the all-weather, round the clock capability to prevent the withdrawals. Walther von Axthelm's I Flak Cops played an important part in operations south of Smolensk. As well as using his 101st and 104th motorised regiments, each with three heavy and one light battalion, supported the Second Panzer Army. It was used to protect the ground forces, and claimed 500 Soviet aircraft between 22 August and 9 September, but was also used against ground targets. It claimed 360 Soviet vehicles in the same period.

=== First Axis problems ===
The most concerning aspect for the Axis at this stage as the lack of aircraft. The VVS Western Front had received 900 new aircraft in July. In contrast, Luftflotte 2 had lost 447 in the opening battles for Smolensk, 6 to 19 July. On the Eastern Front the Luftwaffe had lost 1,284 aircraft, half of its original strength. The Kampfgruppen still contributed to the fighting; claiming 126 trains and 15 supply bridges destroyed at Orel, Korobets and Stodolishsche. Another 73 precious motor vehicles, 22 tanks, 15 rail cars had also been destroyed by German air attacks along with another 40 on 25 July. As the pocket was finally destroyed in early August, the Luftwaffe contributed with another round of claims; 100 tanks, 1,500 trucks, 41 artillery pieces and 24 AAA batteries in Smolensk alone. The intensity of the air war over Smolensk it indicated in the number of operations and sorties flown; 12,653 German and 5,200 Soviet. Hitler's attention shifted to Leningrad, and Richthofen's Fliegerkorps VIII was dispatched on 30 July. Hitler's Directive 34 demanded the capture of the port city. Army Group Centre was ordered onto the defensive.

The increased size of the operational theatre, and the ability of the Soviets to replace losses (partly through American Lend-Lease) affected the Luftwaffe's influence on the ground battle. Soviet production replaced aircraft at an "astonishing" rate, while damage to rail and communication lines were repaired very quickly, meaning German air attacks in this regard could only have temporary effect. The size of the operational theatre meant that German fighter operations were also difficult. While in quality of aircraft, combat tactics, morale and technical standard, the Luftwaffe was still ahead, the Soviets were showing a considerable ability to gain air superiority over the front as the inadequate number of German aircraft was unable to garner air control everywhere. Only local superiority could be obtained, whenever the Bf 109s appeared in strength. German Army forces continually complained about Soviet superiority in the air. The complete supremacy over the front, won in the initial strikes, was beginning to slip away.

The lack of aircraft for long-range reconnaissance was also a problem. In order to maintain the pressure, and locate any potential Soviet build-up operations, the Luftwaffe needed strategic reconnaissance assets. The large size of the theatre made this essential. However, the lack of units and aircraft meant only select regions could be kept under observation. It was determined the required two daily reconnaissance operations against any one line was impossible to implement for these reasons. Thus the Wehrmacht's air intelligence sections unable to act as the eyes of the army and alert it to danger. What units were available were concentrated in the areas of main pressure.

Another difficulty was communications. The Air Signals Corps was put under severe pressure. Radio signals over vast areas were vulnerable to interception so telephone lines were used instead. The line from Richthofen's Fliegerkorps VII to Kesselring's command train at Luftflotte 2 was 780 miles. Telephone communications were vulnerable to Partisans. However, the development of radio and their use with forward air controllers, the Flivos was critical and remained unaffected. In this tactical sphere, reports received could be acted upon in real time by use of radio in a short time, lessening the ability of the enemy to react. It enabled the Luftwaffe to respond quickly to fluid events right at the front.

=== Stalemate before Moscow ===
The central role played by the Luftwaffe was evident when Richthofen's Fliegerkorps VIII was moved to Luftflotte 1 in early August. This left only Fliegerkorps II under Loerzer in the central from, splitting Kesselring's Air Fleet in two. Loerzer lost StG 77 to Luftflotte 4, but gained III./KG 26, I./KG 28 and KGr 100. The lack of substantial air support forced Army Group Centre to abandon a drive on Moscow, and instead to Roslava, where the Soviet 28th Army was putting pressure on the army group's southern flank, in coordination with the other elements of the Reserve front to the north east, at Yelnya. Guderian's Second Panzer Army defeated the 28th Army, and captured 38,000 prisoners. An important part of the victory achieved by Fliegerkorps II owing to weak Soviet air defences. Most of the 3rd Bomber Aviation Corps in the area, under the overall direction of Georgy Zhukov, was protected Moscow and focusing on Yelyna, south east of Smolensk.

At Yelyna, VVS Reserve Front, under Boris Pogrebov attacked German positions relentlessly, but suffered heavy losses to JG 51, the main German fighter wing in the area. But while the battles in the Fliegerkorps II area went in the German favour, the north, where Fliegerkorps VIII had operated, there was little to stop the VVS gaining air superiority. The German Ninth Army acknowledged that the "enemy enjoys air superiority in the whole army sector." The Soviets also began using fast ground attack aircraft. It made interception difficult and German fighter units often arrived late. Pursuing the Soviets was unprofitable over enemy lines because of strong Soviet AAA fire. The attacks caused light losses, but it lowered the morale of the soldiers.

The VVS brought in large numbers of aircraft from all over the country, though most were obsolete and training machines. This brought the strength of VVS to 3,700 by August. But ill-trained and inexperienced crews resulted in continuing heavy losses. Yet by 30 August, the VVS had sustained air superiority, though it failed to help Zhukov make any head way at Yelnya, and Guderian achieving a series of tactical success at Roslavl and Krichev. The effect of Soviet aviation was evident in the severe losses among German transports. By 31 August, the Luftwaffe had lost 1,320 (820 destroyed) since 22 June including 170 Army reconnaissance aircraft and 97 transports and liaison machines. The overwhelming majority were lost to air attack. The VVS reported the loss of 903 aircraft from 10 July to 10 September.

The Soviets believed the Blitzkrieg had been stopped short of Moscow. Many started to hope for an imminent turning point in the war. However, the focus of the Wehrmacht had shifted to the north and south; to Kiev and Leningrad.

=== Luftflotte 1, the Baltic, advance on Leningrad ===
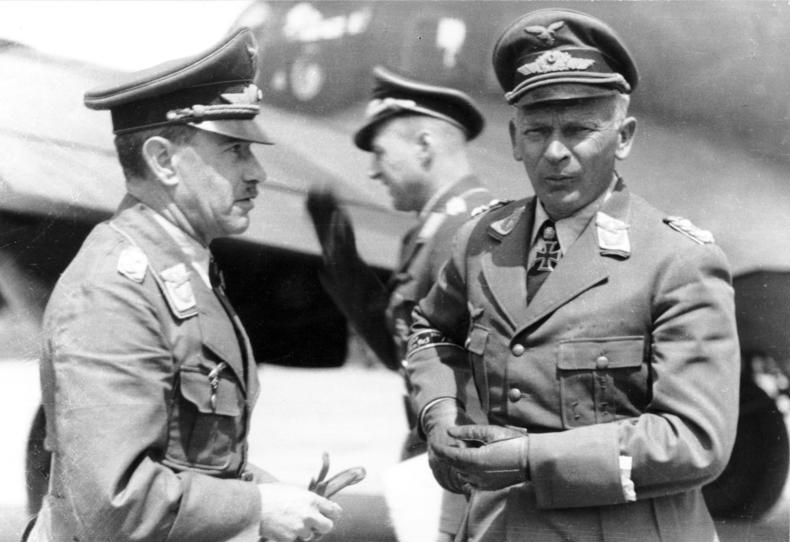
Alexander Löhr, c-in-c Luftflotte 4 (left) and Richthofen of Fliegerkorps VIII. Richthofen's Corps was a specialised ground attack organisation.

In accordance with Hitler's new directive and Luftwaffe flexibility, Fliegerkorps VIII was moved to Luftflotte 1 from Luftflotte 2 to give the former much needed ground support units. II./ and 10(s)./LG 2, III./JG 27, II./JG 52, Do 17s from Stab., I./KG 2, III./KG 3 and Ju 8s from I., III./StG 2 and II./StG 1 and III./StG 1 now came under the air fleet's order of battle. On 8 August, the Fourth Panzer Army opened its assault on the Luga Front, south west of Leningrad.

Commander of the Red Army Northwestern Front, Markian Popov demanded all out attacks on the Axis by the VVS. Although the VVS North-Western Front had 560 aircraft, they were dispersed because of another attack by the Finnish Army in the Karelian Isthmus, north of Leningrad. To support the defence in the north, 162 Soviet aircraft were dispatched. The VVS KBF Naval Aviation was tied up in supporting the Soviet 8th Army in the Battle of Estonia and attacking Berlin.

The weather cleared on 10 August enabled Alexsandr Novikov to send 2 BAD and 7th Fighter Aviation Regiment of 5th Mixed Aviation Division from the Lake Imlen and Karelian Isthmus regions. IL-2s from 288th Attack Aviation Regiment claimed large success against Axis ground forces as the VVS North-Western Front flew 908 sorties. Luftflotte 1 flew 1,126 operations on 10 August, claiming ten tanks, 200 motor vehicles and 15 artillery pieces. KG 77, on Luftflotte 1's order of battle since 22 June, was invaluable in attacks on Luga, without which the Fourth Panzer Army could not have advanced. The German Army also reported heavy enemy ground attacks, which compelled ZG 26 and II./JG 54 to turn its attention to Soviet airfields claiming 17 to 22 destroyed. On 13 August the Fourth Panzer reached the rail line connecting Tallinn to Leningrad. Novikov dispatched 126 navy aircraft to assist the 8th Army, but air cover was limited. The German Eleventh Army reached Lake Novgorod, north of Lake Ilmen, which would cut communications from Moscow to Leningrad. The battle lasted for 11 days. StG 2 played a vital part, knocking out supply bridges and destroying the fortress in the city. Novgorod was abandoned on 24 August. Luftflotte 2 noted the strength of Soviet air defences were greater than in the central sector.

The Northwestern Front, Red Army, attempted to relieve the pressure in the Novgorod sector. It launched a counterattack near Staraya Russa. All of Fliegerkorps VIII was thrown into countering the attack supplemented by KG 76 and KG 77 from Fliegerkorps I. The attacks destroyed the Soviet concentrations. I./KG 4 conducted rolling attacks all over the front which had a devastating effect on Soviet troop's positions. Do 17s from KG 2 destroyed 18 tanks in one mission on 17 August. The Luftwaffe also maintained pressure on local airfields to maintain air superiority. ZG 26 destroyed 20 Soviet aircraft and damaged 13 more on 19 August, though the Germans claimed 40 for one loss. The next day another 18 were destroyed in counter air operations by ZG 26. Fliegerkorps I also contributed decisively to the battle, attacking and destroying Soviet rail traffic.

On 20 August the German Eighteenth Army captured Narva, cutting off and encircling Tallinn and the Sixteenth Army captured Chudovo, cutting one of the two main communication lines from Moscow to Leningrad. Fliegerkorps VIII dropped 3,000 tons of bombs in the preceding 10 days in support of these operations. Wilhelm Ritter von Leeb shifted the XXXXI Panzerkorps south west, instead of north east towards Leningrad. He intended to surround the Soviets in the Luga-Novgorod area. But the Soviets were well prepared, not least in the air. The VVS North West received 402nd and 6th Fighter Aviation Regiments which revived Soviet air power there. Equipped with 32 new LaGG-3 fighters, it boasted strength of 174 aircraft on 24 August. The German noticed that the Soviets had improved in quality. The bulk of the 299 aircraft available in the north were given to the VVS Leningrad Front. Only the 1st and 55th Mixed Aviation Division were assigned to the VVS Karelian Front.

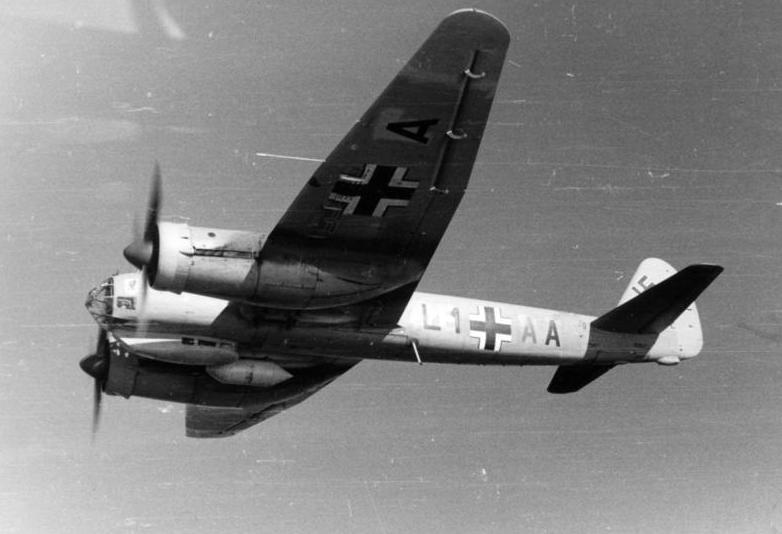
Ju 88A of Lehrgeschwader 1 over the Eastern Front, 25 September 1941.

Richthofen moved his units to Spasskaya, 48 kilometers north east of Novgorod to support operations. The XXXXI Panzerkorps succeeded in encircling the Soviets, but in their defence the PVO 7 Fighter Aviation Corps engaged Fliegerkorps VIII in a series of intense air battles on 25 August. Over the next four days more battles took place. JG 54 claimed 188 victories in August; the 7 Fighter Aviation Corps admitting 44 losses between 20 and 30 August, for 25 claims made. The 26th and 191st Fighter Aviation Regiment lost 17 fighters between them, while the 35th and 44th Fighter Aviation Regiments suffered the loss of five between them, from a force of 154 fighters (113 serviceable). The hardest hit German units were StG 1 and KG 77, which lost 20 and 14 respectively. Over the next few days, Operation Beowulf captured the small Estonian islands and the Luftwaffe turned its attention to Leningrad. Messerschmitt Me 321 transports brought in supplies for the infantry formations ashore, while bombing attacks were carried out against coastal batteries during further operations, such as Nordwind. On 21 October all the Baltic islands were declared under Axis control. The Luftwaffe's losses eight Ju 88s, two Bf 110s, two Bf 109s and an air-sea-rescue aircraft. It flew 1,313 sorties against Saaremaa island, claiming 26 batteries, 25 artillery pieces, 26 motor vehicles, 16 field emplacements, seven bunkers, seven barracks, one ammunition dump and two columns of horse-drawn transport. In addition four motor torpedo boats, three minesweepers, 13 merchant ships and four smaller ships were sunk. In the air 15 enemy aircraft were destroyed.

The Luftwaffe also did much damage to the Soviet Red Banner Baltic Fleet during the Baltic advance. Ju 88 units operating over Estonia inflicted severe losses on Soviet shipping. KGr 806 sank the Soviet destroyer Karl Marx on 8 August 1941 in Loksa Bay Tallinn. During the Soviet evacuation of Tallinn, more damage was done. On 28 August the Ju 88s had more success when KG 77 and KGr 806 sank the 2,026 grt steamer Vironia, the 2,317 grt Lucerne, the 1,423 grt Atis Kronvalds and the ice breaker Krišjānis Valdemārs (2,250 grt). The rest of the Soviet "fleet", were forced to change course. This took them through a heavily mined area. As a result, 21 Soviet warships, including five destroyers, struck mines and sank. On 29 August, the Ju 88s accounted for the transport ships Vtoraya Pyatiletka (3,974 grt), Kalpaks (2,190 grt) and Leningradsovet (1,270 grt) sunk. Furthermore, the ships Ivan Papanin, Saule, Kazakhstan and the Serp i Molot were damaged. Some 5,000 Soviet soldiers were lost.

Luftwaffe Commander Baltic had been set up in April 1941, and brought together units under an ad hoc command system to disrupt Soviet sea traffic around Leningrad. The White Sea – Baltic Canal was rendered unusable for some time after a major lock was knocked out at Povenets on 15 July. From 22 June to 31 August, 1,775 sorties was flown against the canal; 737 by the 806th Coastal Air Group, 339 by JG 54 and eight by II./KG 1, and a number by small naval air squadrons. They sank 66,000 tons of shipping including five destroyers and another 17,000 tons of merchant shipping damaged, probably beyond saving. One heavy cruiser, 17 destroyers and 132,000 tons of merchant shipping was damaged for the loss of 11 Ju 88s and five Bf 109s. Three Arado Ar 95 and one Arado Ar 196 was lost. The VVS lost 46 aircraft in defensive operations. On 26 October, Leningrad had been completely surrounded, and there was little need to attack the canal passing through, since it was blocked by siege. Luftwaffe Command Baltic was disbanded on 26 October and some of its units sent to Fliegerkorps I.

=== Luftflotte 4 at Uman ===
The Southwestern Front under the command of Mikhail Kirponos had offered severe resistance to Army Group South, under von Rundstedt. In mid-July it halted the Axis advance west of Kiev. Frustrated, Rundstedt instructed the bulk of his army group to head south, towards Uman. The intention was to envelop the Soviets via a flank attack on their open left flank. Luftflotte 4 under Alexander Löhr was ordered to support the operation.

The Luftwaffe's attacks on Soviet railway lines had a tremendous impact on the Red Army's ability to conduct operations west of the Dnieper. It enabled the First Panzer Army to capture Bila Tserkva, south west of Kiev. The German Eleventh Army prepared to cross the Dniestr river in a northerly direction. It was soon realised the Germans were attempted an encirclement operation, and the VVS was called in. The VVS Southern Front was still engaged in Moldavia, so the battered VVS South Western Front had to be deployed. Kirponos told Astakhov, commanding the VVS formation, "Take all you've got and throw it against the tanks...! Keep on attacking! This is your main task!" The few bombers left took to the air. Fortunately bad weather prevented German fighters intercepting effectively and considerable damage was done to German columns, but the offensive could not be stopped.

StG 77 supported the Eleventh Army to Yampol, while German bombers pounded rail transports despite low cloud and rain. KG 27 claimed 20 trains destroyed on 20 July. Luftflotte 4 flew continuous interdiction attacks, and there was little to stop them. With the VVS needing to concentrate its diminished assets at the critical points, Soviet units were ordered back to Kiev to rebuild and help prevent the Germans crossing the Dniepr. The Soviets effectively abandoned the skies over Uman. By 25 July it became clear the effect of air interdiction was having, when a Soviet communication to Moscow stated; "All efforts to withdraw the 6th and 12th Armies to the east and north east are fruitless."

But attrition was starting to show in the German ranks. Several German formations had to be sent home owing to their depleted state. Stab./JG 53, I./JG 53, I./KG 54, III./KG 51 and III./55 had all been withdrawn to Germany. I./KG 54 had been particularly successful, claiming thousands of vehicles, 240 aircraft and hundreds of tanks and artillery destroyed at a cost of 23 aircraft.

On 7 August the Soviets attempted to relieve the pocket by launching a surprise counter offensive at Boguslav, halfway between Kiev and Uman. For a while it seemed as the entire German flank was going to give way and prompt a suspension of operations at Uman. The Luftwaffe tipped the balance back in the Axis favour. Kurt Pflugbeil's Fliegerkorps V conducted rolling attacks on the attacking Soviet 26th Army. In two days 148 motor vehicles and 48 Soviet tanks were destroyed which stopped the attack. Rolling attacks were used in turn against the trapped Soviet armies. On 10 August Luftflotte 2 destroyed another 300 vehicles and 54 tanks. Fliegerkorps V claimed 420 motor vehicles, 58 tanks and 22 artillery batteries. The battle ended with 79,220 soldiers of the two armies dead, and 103,054 captured, although a large number were civilians that had been rounded up.

=== Two Luftflotten against Kiev ===
Soviet South-Western Front's commander, Semyon Budyonny, decided to abandon most of western Ukraine, in light of the Uman disaster. Only the port of Odessa was to be held. His 26th Army, which had been successfully been holding the Germans 96 kilometres south of Kiev. The army was ordered to withdraw across the Dniepr. Von Rundstedt now focused on an encirclement of Kiev from the south, aimed at destroying the 26th Army.

Von Rundstedt turned to the Luftwaffe to repeat the victory at Uman, be destroying logistics and communication lines in order to prevent the 26th Army's retreat. Löhr ordered his units into action. The main retreat route was across the Dniepr, river, so bridges were a prime target. StG 77 and its Ju 87s were called upon to make unbroken attacks on the bridges, particularly at Kanev. The VVS concentrated all available fighter forces in defence of the bridges.

The air battles opened on 13 August when the 88th Fighter Aviation Regiment fought over the bridgehead, against JG 3, which were concentrated there to ensure the Ju 87s were able to carry out their assignments unhindered. Through a skilfully handled withdrawal, the 26th Army was able to escape. Luftflotte 4 failed in its operations to isolate the Soviets, and the defenders themselves blew the bridge once their move was complete.

Löhr, with help from Kesselring's Luftflotte 2, turned to preventing the remnants of the Red Army's Southwestern Front escaping over the lower Dniepr. Luftflotte 2 supported Guderian in the north. On 17 August Robert Ritter von Greim's Fliegerkorps V opened intensive operations against the traffic centres of Dnepropetrovsk, but the air fleet was too weak after eight weeks of operations and was unable to achieve success. Operations were soon shifted to helping the First Panzer Army across the river at Zaporozhye, and Cherkassy. The 11th Panzer Division captured a bridgehead at Gornostaypol before the Soviets could destroy it. The Soviet 5th Army, north of Kiev, followed the 26th Army across the river on 23 August. The same day, after Hitler's order to focus on Leningrad and Kiev, Guderian's Second Panzer Army, Army Group Centre, pushed south at Gomel with the aim of joining with Rundstedt to the east of Kiev. Fliegerkorps II used JG 51 and SKG 210 to support him.

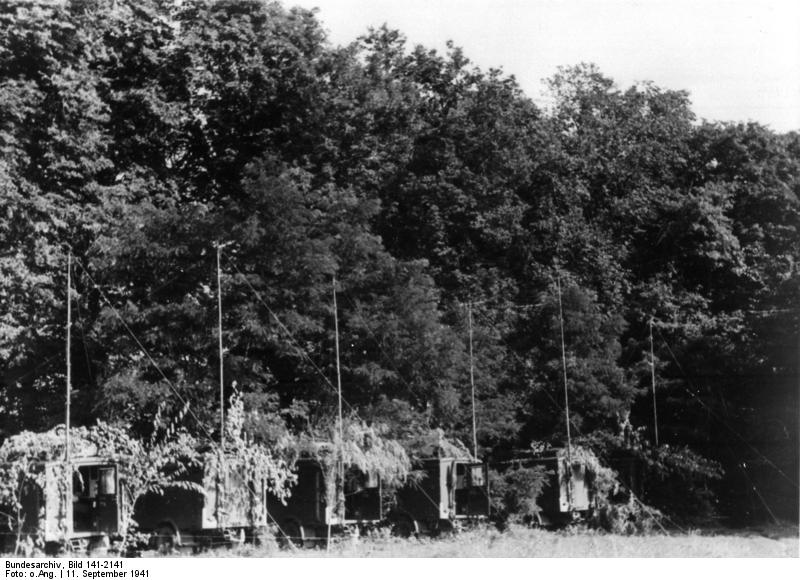
Radio station of the V. Fliegerkorps near Zvenyhorodka on 11 September 1941

KG 3 and KG 53 destroyed the rail stations at Chernigov, 160 kilometres to the south as Guderian broke through the weak Soviet flank, at the junction of the 13th and 40th Soviet Armies, advancing 96 kilometres in the first day and seized bridgeheads at Novhorod-Siverskyi. Kirponos, commanding VVS South-Western Front ordered his forces against the bridgehead at Gornostaypol, but lost 33 of his aircraft in the process. One IL-2 of the 74th Attack Aviation Regiment did knock out the bridgehead with one hit. The loss of the bridge seriously delayed the advance of the German Sixth Army. Meanwhile, 210 Attack Aviation Regiment attacked the bridgehead at Dnepropetrovsk. It claimed several tanks and 13 German vehicles. The Romanian, Hungarian, Italian and Slovak air units were involved in the combats. The 22 Gruppo Caccia had 51 Macchi C.200s on strength and claimed successes for no losses.

To defeat Guderian, the newly formed Bryansk Front under Andrey Yeremenko sought to encircle Guderian's spearhead. It was given the best Soviet equipment, and new T-34 tanks to do the job. He was also assigned the new VVS Bryansk Front under Fydor Polynin. The front had 464 combat aircraft. In August 1941 the new Stavka Reserves, indicated the Soviet ability to replace losses, including six RAG (Reserve Aviation Groups) equipped with the most modern aircraft. It was also supplemented by aircraft from flight schools, from the Transcaucasus Military District, from the Moscow PVO and the naval air forces. The VVS formations suffered high losses against the veteran German formations, JG 51, losing 35 aircraft on 27 August. Fliegerkorps II's bombers delayed reinforcements through interdiction. But when the Soviets did strike on 29 August, it compelled Guderian to go over to the defensive.

Fliegerkorps II attacked the Chernigov bridgeheads to slow down Soviet reinforcements while SKG 210 provided close air support. The VVS was in constant action against German bridgeheads on airfields. At the end of August, Luftflotte 4 was down to 320 bombers, around 100 operational fighters, and 35 reconnaissance machines. The VVS North-Western Front and Southern possessed 493 bombers, 473 fighters and 20 reconnaissance aircraft. Most were concentrated in the first Front. The VVS Southern Front could muster only 119 serviceable machines. Its units had sustained heavy losses in the past four weeks. As Guderian reached the Seym river, halfway between Kiev and Kursk, JG 3 and the Slovak 12 Letka, under the command of Ivan Haluznicky, were concentrated in order to protect them, and were involved in intense air battles with the 249th Fighter Aviation Regiment.

The intervention of German bomber units had a huge impact. At Chernigov, KG 28 bombed supply bridges and artillery concentrations. Other units were also involved. In a measure of the effectiveness of German bombers, KG 3 was credited with 349 trains, 488 trucks, 30 tanks and 450 Soviet aircraft on the ground. It also shot 21 fighters down in combat since 22 June. As a result of air attacks, the Bryansk Front called off the offensive. Counterattacks were ordered by Budyonny against the German Seventeenth Army and First Panzer Army. The Soviet 38th Army attacked, but was pinned down by heavy air attacks. It reported; "Impossible to move in the open terrain due to aerial attacks". Soviet air attacks suffered heavy losses to German fighters. Joseph Stalin intervened personally and over 90 per cent of Soviet aviation to counter Guderian in the north and support the Soviet 40th Army, down to 5,000 soldiers and 10 tanks.

Guderian's army seized more important bridgeheads at Lubny and Lokhvitsa, the latter by the 3rd Panzer Division. The 38th Army's attempt to prevent this was a disaster. The Luftwaffe's rolling attacks destroyed the remnants of the army. The VVS Bransk Front and VVS South-Western Front had lost an opportunity to intervene. German fighters established an air umbrella over the First Panzer Army under Ewald von Kleist as he moved rapidly north to meet Guderian.

On 14 September, the two Panzer Armies were ordered to close the pocket. Guderian established contact with Kleist at Lubny the same day, trapping 450,000 Soviet personnel. The Luftwaffe was now asked to help retain the Red Army within the pocket so they could be destroyed. Fliegerkorps V destroyed 727 trucks operating from Kirovograd. I./KG 55 was credited with 675 trucks, 22 tanks and 58 trains in the Battle of Kiev. One crew destroyed seven trains in a single sortie. Fuel was short owing to logistical shortcomings, and the less fuel thirst Ju 87s were to finish off the trapped forces. On 16 and 17 September, StG 77's Ju 87s destroyed 920 vehicles in the pocket and eliminated the fortress there. Soviet manpower losses were severe. Morale in the pocket was close to collapse. From 12 – 21 September 1941, Fliegerkorps V claimed 42 aircraft destroyed on the ground and 65 in the air, plus 23 tanks and 2,171 motor vehicles. To this total were added 52 trains, 6 anti-aircraft batteries, 52 trains, 28 locomotives destroyed and another 355 damaged motor vehicles, 41 horse-drawn wagons and 36 trains damaged. A bridge and 18 rail lines were severed. The cost was 17 aircraft lost and 14 damaged, nine men killed, five wounded and 18 missing. Fliegerkorps V had flown 1,422 sorties and dropped 567,650 kg of bombs.

The Luftwaffe helped maintain the effectiveness of the encirclement, preventing many, but not all, Soviet formations from escaping. In particular, the destruction of rail lines prevented Soviet forces from reinforcing the line, or withdrawing.

=== Luftflotte 5 over Karelia ===
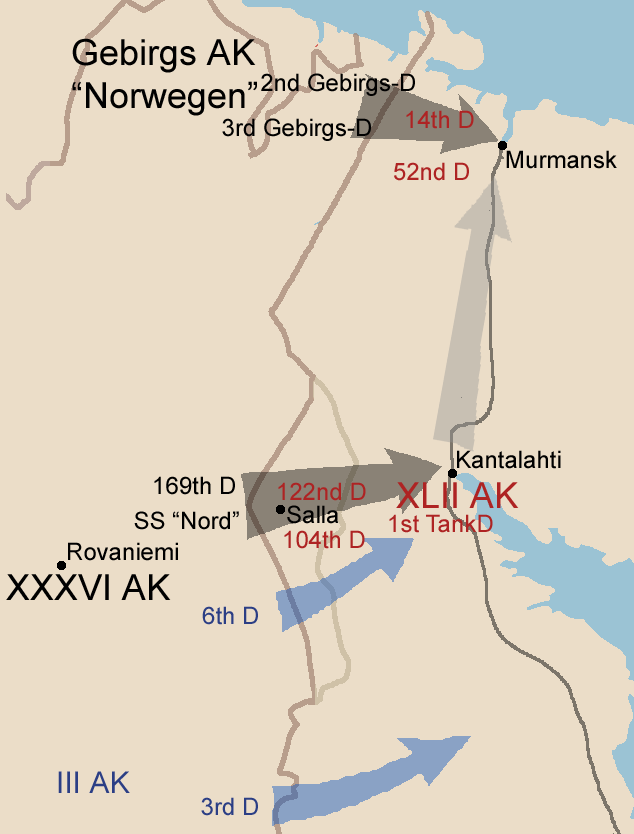
The original plan for operation "Silver Fox".

Hans-Jürgen Stumpff's Luftflotte 5 was responsible for Axis air operations over the far north, along with the Finnish Air Force. The port of Murmansk and the Kirov railway were the major objectives; the later was Murmansk's life line to the Soviet interior. The port was the only ice-free port in northern Russia. Only the 7th Army and 14th Army were deployed. The 7th almost covered the entire Soviet-Finnish border between Lake Ladoga and the Kola Peninsula. The 14th Army protected the northern Kola, the Kirov railway and Murmansk port. The German forces suffered from huge logistics issues. It was only when the Swedish government allowed them to transport their forces through Sweden that these problems were eased. The aim of the Axis was to capture Murmansk, the severe the Kirov railway and isolate the Kola Peninsula.

The air war started in the north before 22 June. 72 SAP VVS was involved in running air skirmishes with reconnaissance aircraft. On 22 June only small raids were carried out owing to weather conditions. One of the air fleet's units, Fliegerführer Kirkenes (Flying Leader Kirkenes), was responsible for air superiority and anti-shipping operations over Murmansk. Almost immediately, German bomber crews of KG 30 came to respect the heavy AAA defences over Murmansk. The Soviet fighter units were also more experienced the most others. Half had seen action during the Spanish Civil War, Battles of Khalkhin Gol or during the Winter War with Finland.

The 145th Fighter Aviation Regiment, 137th Bomber Aviation Regiment and 202 SAP carried out most Soviet operations. KG 30 caused serious damage to Murmansk's port facilities on 29 June and knocked out its power plant. Ju 87s of IV.(St)/LG 1 helped support the ground advance of Eduard Dietl's XIX Mountain Corps. Without the Ju 87s and their continuous attacks on Soviet positions, an advance to Murmansk could not have been made. The VVS struck at German logistics in Liinahamari and Petsamo. The 137th Bomber Aviation Regiment sank one freighter and inflicted heavy damage to the Wharf area and oil tanks in the ports. After advancing only 24 kilometres Dietl's force was halted. Worse was to follow, when the Soviet Northern Fleet landed Soviet marines behind Dietl's force at the Rybachiy Peninsula. LG 1's Ju 87s could not be concentrated on the force, as they were shifted 320 kilometres to the south to help the Finnish-German XXXVI Corps push to Salla in a bid to isolate the Kola, a plan named Operation Silver Fox.

The simultaneous battles stretched German resources. In the north Dietl's force was attacked on 2 July by the 72 SAP which flew 45 operations and dropped 400 bombs in three hours. KG 30 failed to interdict Soviet naval forces and airfields which supported the landing at Rybachy, not least because of VVS fighter defences. The Germans' response was to bring in elements of JG 77, a Bf 109-equipped unit. Supported by Freya radar with a range of 128 to 160 kilometres, increasing numbers of Bf 109s and Bf 110s put the VVS under pressure. In what may be described as psychological warfare, the German pilots practised "helter-skelter" tactics, whereby German fighters attacked bombers and fighters singly but relentlessly to create the impression there were more Axis fighters in combat than there were. They inflicted fearsome losses on the VVS. 147th Fighter Aviation Regiment lost 33 out of 53 I-153s by 9 July. The 145th Fighter Aviation Regiment recorded a loss of 14 losses from 22 June to 10 July.

On 14 and 16 July the Soviet Fleets landed more forces behind Dietl. LG 1's Ju 87s were shifted back to support the Mountain Corps. On 20 July the Soviet destroyer Stremitelnyy was sunk along with the patrol ship SKR-20/Shtil in the Kola Bay by LG 1. Just days later it was moved back to support the offensive at Salla. The unit was treated like a fire-brigade, rushing from one hot spot to another. IV(St)./LG 1's Ju 87s suffered more than any other Stuka unit in 1941, losing 25 of its 36 aircraft. Badly depleted, it could not support a breakthrough to isolate the Kola Peninsula, nor could it support the capture of Murmansk by Dietl. The advance halted 64 kilometres short of the Kirov railway, and three years of positional warfare set in. The greatest success of the Axis in the north came not against the Soviets, but the British Royal Air Force (RAF).

On 25 July 200 P-40s were given to the Soviet Union by Winston Churchill. As a naval strategist, the Far North appealed to Churchill for intervention. He sent the Fleet Air Arm (FAA) to conduct an attack on Finnish bases at Kirkenes and Petsamo. On 30 July the aircraft carrier Victorious and Furious were dispatched to deliver the strike forces. Fairey Albacores of 817 Squadron, Fairey Swordfish from 812 Squadron, escorted by six Fairey Fulmars of 801 Squadron took off. The operation from Victorious was a disaster. 20 Albacores from 827 and 828 Squadrons, and nine Fulmars from 809 Squadrons were intercepted. The FAA losses indicated 13 lost and nine Albacores damaged. Twelve five airmen were killed and 22 captured.

Hurricanes played an important air defence role in 1941. Britain's decision to aid the Soviets meant sending supplies by sea to the far northern ports, and as the convoys would need to sail within range of German bases from the based in neighbouring Finland, it was decided to deliver a number of Hurricane Mk IIBs, flying with Nos. 81 and 134 Squadrons of No. 151 Wing RAF, to provide protection. The carrier Argus delivered 48 P-40s and 39 Hurricanes in August.

=== Siege of Leningrad ===
In early September 1941, German forces surrounded Novgorod and the Luga river and 20,000 Soviet soldiers were captured. With this force removed, the Army Group North could begin operations against Leningrad. Operating with a flexible command structure, the forces of Luftflotte 1 were reinforced with other formations. Wolfram von Richthofen's Fliegerkorps VIII joined Fliegerkorps I from Luftflotte 2 to give Luftflotte 1 much needed ground support units. On 6 September, the air attacks began with an intensity not yet seen in aerial warfare. The two German air corps carried out 1,004 sorties on the first day. From this total, 186 were brought to bare on a front measuring less than 16 square miles. The 186 operations were flown in a series of attacks lasting 11 hours.

The Luftwaffe was free from the interference from Soviet fighters. By concentrating two Fliegerkorps on the entire sector, the Germans achieved numerical superiority. Luftflotte 1 mustered 481 aircraft (203 bombers, 166 fighters, 39 Bf 110s, 12 long-range reconnaissance aircraft and 60 Ju 87s). The VVS Leningrad Front could only muster 286 aircraft (163 operational). Most were fighters. On 14 September, just 21 bombers and strike aircraft were on the order of battle (11 SBs, two IL-2s, six Pe-2s and two Ar-2s). This left the VVS Leningrad Front short of hitting power.

On 8 September Army Group North attacked with the Eighteenth Army on the left and the XXXIX Corps on the right, forming a two-pronged attack. Fliegerkorps VIII put the defending Soviet 54th Army under severe pressure, forcing it back from Lake Ladoga and cutting the city off from the Soviet hinterland. The focus of German air operations shifted to the centre of the city. On the night of 8 September, beginning at 18:55, 6,327 incendiaries alone were dropped by 27 Ju 88s causing 183 fires. Leningrad's Badayevo warehouses were hit, destroying the entire sugar reserve of 2,500 tons. Crews from KG 4 flew two missions per night while the Fliegerkorps flew hundreds of missions in an effort to destroy Leningrad from the air. Missions were mainly flown at night, owing to heavy Soviet AAA fire and fighter defences, reinforced by 7 Fighter Aviation Corps. On 9 September, Luftflotte 1 carried out 479 sorties. On 10 September, it flew 436. On 11 September, the Axis ground forces advanced into the breaches created by the Luftwaffe. The German bomber units flew 478 sorties on 11 September, and pilots from the VVS KBF's 5th Fighter Aviation Regiment had to fly seven missions per day.

On 12 September Zhukov ordered Aleksandr Novikov, commander-in-chief of the VVS North-Western Front to dispatch all available aircraft against German troop concentrations and airfields. Despite heavy pressure by Soviet fighter bombers, the German 58th Infantry Division captured Krasnoye Selo, inside the city district of Leningrad. The Stavka pulled together aircraft from various commands to supply the encircled city from the air on 13 September. The Civil Air Fleet contributed PS-84s (Lisunov Li-2s) from both the Special Northern Aviation Group and six Squadrons from The Moscow Air Group (MAGON GVF). The Long-Range Aviation contributed aircraft from 7th Heavy Bomber Aviation Regiment and 39 TBAE from KBF's transport fleet. Apart from three of MAGON GVF's squadrons, which flew directly from Moscow to Leningrad, most operated out of Tikhvin. Through late September, 100 tons arrived daily from Soviet civil aviation. In October, it increased to 150 tons daily. Losses were light owing to the Soviet tactic of flying in fog and darkness, avoiding German fighters. When Tikhvin was captured in November, TB-3s from 14th Heavy Bomber Aviation Regiment in addition to 7th Heavy Bomber Aviation Regiment. On 9 November, Stalin personally ordered that 200 tons daily were to be flown in over the following five days. 127th and 154th Fighter Aviation Regiments were handed over for escort operations. Although some formations were intercepted, most went undetected. The transports made a considerable contribution to the starving city. The MAGON GVF flew in 6,186 tons, including 4,325 tons of food and 1,271 tons of ammunition from 10 October to 25 December. Soviet fighters flew 1,836 sorties escorting them.

A Soviet counter offensive on 14 September drove the Germans back from Sosnovka and Finskoye Koyrovo, with support from the VVS and Red Banner Fleet. The Luftwaffe responded with an aerial onslaught that surpassed the pressure exerted on the first day. German bomber units flew 606 operations against Soviet positions. Three large ships were spotted by German air reconnaissance trying to make it through to Leningrad across Lake Ladoga (it had not yet frozen). Ju 87s from StG 2 were sent to intercept and sank two of them. The VVS also made a maximum effort against German forces. JG 54 was called upon to protect German supply columns and spearheads under attack on the Luga-Leningrad highway south of Krasnogvardeysk. On Friday 19 September, six major German air attacks against Leningrad caused serious damage. Bombs hit a hospital killing 442 people. Fliegerkorps I record the loss of six aircraft. Logistics issues struck soon after, and the declining number of operational German fighters and increased demands from the German bomber crews for escort against increasingly resistant Soviet fighters left the VVS in control of the air over Leningrad. A combination of this and aggressive Soviet air attacks forced Hitler to abandon Leningrad's capture. Instead, he turned east, toward the wedge that had cut the city off from the Soviet hinterland, and to the Red Army forces that were trying to break it.

The Soviet 54th Army was renamed the 48th Army in September. It had been depleted to 6,000 men after the Battle of Novgorod. But reinforced, it began to threaten the German XXXIX Corps occupying the wedge that cut Leningrad off from the rest of Russia. Provided with effective air support, they forced the 8th Panzer Division back on 24 September. Fliegerkorps VIII had been returned to Luftflotte 2, and the Fourth Panzer Army was sent to Army Group Centre. In addition, Fliegerkorps I's III./KG 4 and KG 76 had been sent to the central sector for the upcoming attack on Moscow. At this point, the Soviets nearly re-established communications with Leningrad, and driving the German XXXIX Corps back. The army turned to the Luftwaffe to fly in reinforcements quickly. The Spanish Blue Division, the German 72nd Infantry Division from France, and the 7th Fliegerdivision were all flown in by I., II., IV./KGzbV 1, KGrzbV 106, I., and II./LG 1 of the Luftwaffe's transport units.

The Germans withdrew several units from Luftflotte 1. JG 53 headed back to Germany leaving JG 54 as the air fleet's only fighter unit and Fliegerkorps VIII was given back to Kesselring for the Moscow offensive. The VVS North-Western Front was reduced to the size of a division, with only 191 aircraft on strength by 22 September. It had sustained 1,283 combat losses including 749 in the air. On the Northern Front (including the arctic), total losses amounted to 2,692 since 22 June. Only 450 replacements had reached the line. Several divisions, including the 2 BAD and 41st Mixed Aviation Division were almost destroyed. It was fortunate that Soviet intelligence correctly determined that the Germans were abandoning the Leningrad offensive, and moving their armour to the central sector. It was decided that Moscow was the more vulnerable city, so the Red Army and VVS concentrated its greatest resources there.

=== Strategic bombing ===
In November 1941, the Wehrmacht was already near Moscow. But from the rear of the Soviet Union, military equipment and armaments continued to arrive. The main supplier was GAZ, which was in Gorky (now Nizhny Novgorod). Therefore, the German command developed a plan to destroy the industrial potential and occupation of the city. Thus, Germany was counting on gaining control over the entire Volga region. On 4 November, the Luftwaffe began bombing of Gorky.

After the first raid, some workshops of GAZ and the Dvigatel Revolyutsii plant were damaged. The main building was destroyed at the Nitel plant, which caused the death of the director and management. The second attack on the city brought much more destruction. GAZ was almost completely disabled. On its territory, many shops and adjoining social facilities were destroyed.
