= Konstantin Vershinin =

Commander of the Soviet air force (1900–1973)

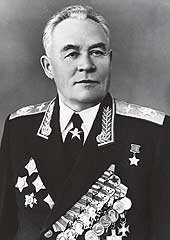
- Vershinin c. 1959
- Born: May 21, 1900; Borkino, Russian Empire
- Died: December 30, 1973 (aged 73); Moscow, Russian SFSR, Soviet Union
- Burial place: Novodevichy Cemetery
- Military career
- Allegiance: Soviet Union (1919–1973)
- Service years: 1919–1973
- Rank: Chief marshal of the aviation
- Commands: 16th Air Army; Soviet Air Forces; Soviet Air Defence Forces
- Conflicts: World War II
- Awards: Hero of the Soviet Union

Chief marshal of the aviation Konstantin Andreevich Vershinin (Russian: Константин Андреевич Вершинин; 3 June 1900 – 30 December 1973) was commander-in-chief of the Soviet Air Force from 1946 to 1949 and from 1957 to 1969.

He was commander of the 4th Air Army in World War II, and for his actions, he was awarded the distinction of Hero of the Soviet Union in 1944. At the outbreak of the Bolshevik Revolution, he left his work in a sawmill to enter the Red Army. In 1929, he was sent to the Zhukovsky Air Force Academy located in Moscow.

In 1946 — as Commander-in-chief of Air Force — Deputy Ministry of Defence of the USSR, he supervised the Air Force transition to the jet era. He was promoted to Marshal of Aviation (3 July 1946).

In September 1949 unexpectedly lowered in grade and appointed chief commander of Baku PVO Region. He was commander of the 14th Air Army in the Ukrainian SSR from February to September 1950. From June 1953 until May 1954 - commander PVO Forces. He served as Commander of the Soviet Air Force from January 1957 to 1969 and was a Deputy Minister of Defence of the USSR. On 8 May 1959 he was promoted to Chief Marshal of Aviation. From March 1969 he was an inspector of the Group of Inspectors General of Ministry of Defence of the USSR.

Member of CPSU from 1919. Candidate for TsK KPSS in 1952–1956. Member of TsK KPSS from 1961. Deputy of Supreme Soviet of the Soviet Union II (1946–1950), IV—VII (from 1954) convocations.

Vershinin died after a long illness on December 30, 1973, in Moscow, and was buried at Novodevichy Cemetery.

== Awards and decorations ==
Soviet Union

Hero of the Soviet Union ("Gold Star" No. 3869, 19 August 1944)
Order of Lenin, six times (23 December 1942, 21 July 1944, 19 August 1944, 21 February 1945, 20 May 1960, 22 May 1970)
Order of the October Revolution (22 February 1968)
Order of the Red Banner, thrice (27 March 1942, 3 November 1944, 15 November 1950)
Order of Suvorov, 1st class, thrice (16 May 1944, 10 April 1945, 29 May 1945)
Order of Suvorov, 2nd class (25 October 1943)
Order of the Patriotic War, 1st class (22 February 1943)
Medal "For the Defence of the Caucasus" (1 May 1944)
Medal "For the Capture of Königsberg" (9 June 1945)
Medal "For the Victory over Germany in the Great Patriotic War 1941–1945" (1945)
Jubilee Medal "Twenty Years of Victory in the Great Patriotic War 1941–1945" (7 May 1965)
Jubilee Medal "XX Years of the Workers' and Peasants' Red Army" (22 February 1938)
Jubilee Medal "30 Years of the Soviet Army and Navy" (22 February 1948)
Jubilee Medal "40 Years of the Armed Forces of the USSR" (18 December 1957)
Jubilee Medal "50 Years of the Armed Forces of the USSR" (22 December 1967)
Medal "In Commemoration of the 800th Anniversary of Moscow" (20 September 1947)

Foreign

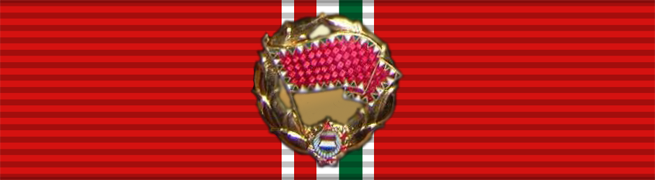
Order of the Red Banner (Hungary)
Knight of the Virtuti Militari (Poland)
Order of the Cross of Grunwald, 1st class (Poland)
Medal "For Oder, Neisse and the Baltic" (Poland)
Medal "For Warsaw 1939–1945" (Poland)

Military offices
Preceded by Pavel Zhigarev	Commander-in-Chief of the Soviet Air Force; 1957–1969	Succeeded by Pavel Kutakhov
Preceded by Alexander Novikov	Commander-in-Chief of the Soviet Air Force; 1946–1949	Succeeded by Pavel Zhigarev
