= Pavel Zhigarev =

Russian aerial commander (1900–1963)

Pavel Fyodorovich Zhigarev
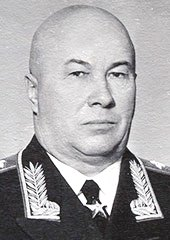
- Born: 6 September 1900; Brikovo, Tver Oblast, Russian Empire
- Died: 2 August 1963 (aged 62); Moscow, Russian SFSR, Soviet Union
- Military career
- Allegiance: Soviet Union
- Branch: Red Army; Soviet Air Forces
- Service years: 1919–1963
- Rank: Chief Marshal of Aviation
- Commands: Soviet Air Forces
- Conflicts: Russian Civil War; World War II; Great Patriotic War; Soviet–Japanese War; Korean War
- Awards: Order of Lenin (twice); Order of the Red Banner (three times); Order of Kutuzov First Class; Order of the Red Star

Pavel Fyodorovich Zhigarev (Па́вел Фёдорович Жи́гарев; November 6, 1900 – August 2, 1963) was a Soviet commander-in-chief of the Soviet Air Forces (VVS) twice (1941–1942, 1949–1957), and also served as the Chief Marshal of Aviation from 1955 to 1959.

== Early life and education ==
Zhigarev was born on November 6, 1900, to a poor peasant family in the village of Brikovo, located in present-day Tver Oblast. He joined the Red Army in 1919 and fought in the Russian Civil War. While serving the Red Army, he attended Cavalry School and switched to a cavalry unit after graduating in 1922. He turned to the Air Force after the civil war, graduating from Military Pilot School in 1927 and the N. E. Zhukovskii Air Force Academy in 1932.

== Rise to prominence ==
In 1937, Zhigarev became the commander of 52nd Light Bomber Aviation Brigade, his first major command position. From 1937 to 1938, he was also the Deputy Military Attaché to China. Zhigarev then served as the Head of the Directorate for Combat Training of the Air Force in the People's Commissariat of Defence from 1938 to 1939. In 1939 Zhigarev was promoted to the position of Commanding Officer of the 2nd Separate Red Banner Army Air Forces, and then to Commanding Officer of the Far Eastern Front Air Forces a year later.

== World War II ==
=== Operation Barbarossa ===
Before the outbreak of the Great Patriotic War Zhigarev served as First Deputy Head of the Main Directorate of the Air Force in the People's Commissariat of Defence. He was then promoted to become its Head in 1941, as well as simultaneously holding the positions of Commander in Chief of the Air Force and Deputy People's Commissar of Defence. As Commander of the Air Force, he was also a member of the Supreme Military Council of the Red Army.

Zhigarev's promotion to the position of Commander of the Air Force was largely due to the elimination of high-ranking officers in the Great Purge. The Air Force, or VVS as it was then called, suffered particularly badly in the Purge, and Zhigarev's three predecessors (Aleksandr Loktionov, Yakov Smushkevich, and Pavel Rychagov) were all executed in 1941 by the NKVD for perceived military failures.

Zhigarev was the Commander of the Air Force during the entirety of Operation Barbarossa. Upon the outbreak of war, the VVS possessed 7,850 aircraft in the Western Soviet Union, in addition to the 1,500 aircraft of the Soviet Navy. At the very beginning of the war, German bombers launched a massive operation to destroy Soviet planes on the ground. Since the Soviets had been caught by surprise, 3,000 aircraft were destroyed on the first day alone. Throughout Operation Barbarossa, Soviet aircraft were proven deeply inferior to German planes in terms of combat capability; the Soviet bomber fleet was almost completely wiped out. However, despite disastrous losses, the VVS did manage to recover slowly for the rest of Operation Barbarossa, though the Luftwaffe did continue to hold air superiority, if not supremacy.

=== Vyazma and Operation Hannover ===
As the speed of the German advance slowed and the VVS began reasserting itself, the Soviets launched a major operation which became the Battles of Rzhev. In particular, Zhigarev presided over the Vyazma airborne operation, a major operation conducted by the 4th Airborne Corps which was intended to cut off German supply and communication lines. However, the operation was not a success, and airborne elements were eliminated by German forces in Operation Hannover. As a result, Zhigarev's stint as Commander of the Air Force lasted only a short time, as he was replaced in 1942 by Alexander Novikov. He then returned to serve as the Commanding Officer of the Far Eastern Front Air Forces.

=== Soviet–Japanese War ===
In 1945 he became the Commanding Officer of the 10th Air Army, participating in the Soviet–Japanese War, and was then transferred to the 29th Air Army in the same year. In the Soviet-Japanese War, the Soviets began with 5,368 aircraft, against only 1,800 Japanese aircraft, of which only 50 were first-line. The Soviet-Japanese War was in many ways a perfect operation for the Red Army, as Japanese forces collapsed rapidly and the entirety of Manchukuo was liberated within days.

== Post-war ==
From 1946 to 1949 Zhigarev simultaneously served as the First Deputy Commander in Chief of the Air Force and as the Commander in Chief of Long Range Aviation. In 1949 he returned once again as the Commander in Chief of the Air Force, a position that he would hold until 1957. During this period he was also the Deputy Minister of War (1949–53), the Deputy Minister of Defence, (1953–55), and the Chief Marshal of Aviation (1955–59). From 1959 to his death in 1963, he was the Commandant of the Military Command Academy of Air Defence.

He held the non-military position of Head of Main Directorate of Civil Aviation from 1957 to 1959.

== Political career ==
Zhigarev was a deputy in the third, fourth, and fifth convocations of the Supreme Soviet of the Soviet Union, and also a candidate member of the Central Committee of the Communist Party of the Soviet Union from 1952 to 1961.

== Honours ==
Order of Lenin, twice (22 October 1941, 21 February 1945)
Order of the Red Banner, thrice (14 March 1938, 3 November 1944, 2 September 1950)
Order of Kutuzov, 1st class (8 September 1945)
Order of the Red Star (25 May 1936)
Medal "For the Defence of Moscow" (1 May 1944)
Medal "For the Victory over Germany in the Great Patriotic War 1941–1945" (9 May 1945)
Medal "For the Victory over Japan" (30 September 1945)
Jubilee Medal "XX Years of the Workers' and Peasants' Red Army" (22 February 1938)
Jubilee Medal "30 Years of the Soviet Army and Navy" (22 February 1948)
Jubilee Medal "40 Years of the Armed Forces of the USSR" (18 December 1957)
Medal "In Commemoration of the 800th Anniversary of Moscow" (20 September 1947)

Military offices
Preceded by Pavel Rychagov	Soviet Air Force (VVS) Commander; 1941–1942	Succeeded by Alexander Novikov
Preceded by Konstantin Vershinin	Soviet Air Force (VVS) Commander; 1949–1957	Succeeded by Konstantin Vershinin
