= Borkino =

Borkino Боркино
- Selo
- Location within Astrakhan Oblast Location within Russia
- Coordinates: 46°03′N 47°38′E
- Country: Russia
- Region: Astrakhan Oblast
- District: Ikryaninsky District
- Time zone: UTC+4:00

Borkino (Russian: Боркино) is a rural locality (a selo) in Ikryaninsky Selsoviet of Ikryaninsky District, Astrakhan Oblast, Russia. The population was 214 as of 2010. There are 8 streets.

== Geography ==
Borkino is located on the Khurdun River, 9 km southwest of Ikryanoye (the district's administrative centre) by road. Sergino is the nearest rural locality.
