= Alexander Novikov =

Soviet chief marshal of aviation (1900–1976)

- Алекса́ндр Алекса́ндрович Но́виков
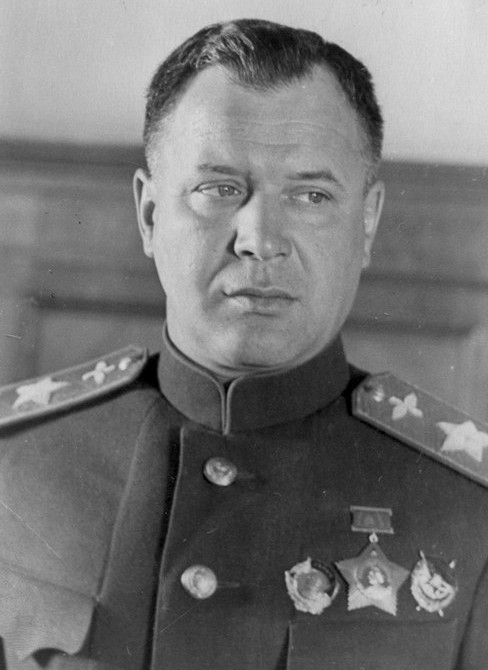
- Novikov c. 1943
- Born: 19 November 1900; Nerekhta, Kostroma Governorate, Russian Empire
- Died: 3 December 1976 (aged 76); Moscow, Russian SFSR, Soviet Union
- Military career
- Allegiance: Soviet Union
- Branch: Red Army (1919–1933); Soviet Air Force (1933–1958)
- Service years: 1919–1956
- Rank: Chief marshal of aviation
- Commands: Soviet Air Forces
- Conflicts: World War II; Winter War; Eastern Front
- Awards: Hero of the Soviet Union (twice)

Alexander Alexandrovich Novikov (Russian: Алекса́ндр Алекса́ндрович Но́виков; 19 November [O.S. 6 November] 1900 – 3 December 1976) was the chief marshal of aviation for the Soviet Air Forces during the Soviet Union's involvement in the Second World War. Lauded as "the man who has piloted the Red Air Force through the dark days into the present limelight", and a "master of tactical air power", he was twice given the title of Hero of the Soviet Union as well as a number of other Soviet decorations.

A gifted air force commander and one of the leading men of the Soviet armed forces, Novikov was involved in nearly all exploits of the air force during the war and was at the forefront of developments in command and control and of air combat techniques. After the war, Novikov was arrested by order of the Politburo, and was forced by the NKVD chief, Lavrentiy Beria, into a "confession" that implicated Marshal Georgy Zhukov in a conspiracy. Novikov was then imprisoned until the death of Joseph Stalin in 1953, whereupon he became an avionics teacher and writer until his death.

== Early life and career ==
Novikov was born in Kryukovo, a village in Nerekhta, in Kostroma Oblast. In 1919 he became an infantryman in the Red Army, and in 1920 became a party member.

He served in the 384th regiment of the Russian 7th Army, helped put down the Kronstadt uprising in March 1921, and he served as a platoon commander during anti-guerrilla fighting in the Caucasus in 1922. Having graduated from the M. V. Frunze Military Academy in 1930, Novikov moved to the air force in 1933, and served as chief of operations until 1935, when he took command of a light bomber squadron.

Novikov was expelled from the party and the armed forces in 1937; however, he was re-admitted by the Commissioner of the Byelorussian Military District, A. I. Mezis, who was in turn arrested. Novikov served as chief of the air force staff of the Leningrad Military District prior to serving in the Winter War during 1939 and 1940. For his service in the conflict he was promoted to major general and earned the Order of Lenin. He continued to command the Air Forces of the Leningrad Military District until the outbreak of World War II.

== World War II ==
During the early setbacks of the Russian army at the hand of Nazi Germany, Novikov and the Leningrad air forces took part in a number of strikes against the advancing German armies, including the first Soviet air operation of the war, from 25 to 30 June 1941, which cost the Germans 130 aircraft. During this time, Novikov was noted for his skill in command and for his innovation, particularly the then unknown use of radio to coordinate bomber flights. In July 1941, Novikov expanded his command from Leningrad to include air forces of the Northern Front, Northwestern Front and the Baltic Fleet, and as the Germans approached Leningrad, Novikov and his forces flew 16,567 sorties.

Novikov briefly held the position of first deputy to the air force commander from February until 11 April 1942. He then became commander of the Red Army Air Force – deputy to the people's commissar of defense of the USSR for aviation, a position from which he began to reorganize the Soviet air force. He worked specifically for the creation of separate divisions and air corps, as well as the improvement of front line coordination. During the Battle of Stalingrad, Novikov successfully persuaded Georgy Zhukov and, in turn, Joseph Stalin that the air force was not ready for a planned counter-offensive, an argument to which both commanders eventually conceded. After a substantial period of development, Novikov was able to provide Zhukov with an aerial blockade of the German forces at Stalingrad, along with the destruction of 1,200 enemy planes. Later operations over Kuban destroyed another 1,100 planes.

At the Battle of Kursk, Novikov introduced new innovations such as shaped-charge bombs, night fighters and ground-attack aircraft. The Battle of Königsberg saw 2,500 combat aircraft under Novikov being made available to the besieging armies, with the Soviet air marshal recommending low-level heavy night bombers being used. 514 of these dropped 4,440 tons of bombs on the beleaguered city. For his part in the operation Novikov was made Hero of the Soviet Union, and on 24 June 1944 the United States awarded him a Legion of Merit. Novikov then transferred to the Pacific Theatre to fight against Japan, where he was made Hero of the Soviet Union a second time for his Far Eastern efforts.

== Post-war career ==
On 16 January 1946 Novikov submitted to Stalin plans that would lay the groundwork for the modern Soviet air force and the industry that would supply it. On 22 April 1946, however, before these could be enacted, Novikov was stripped of his rank and titles and arrested. The reason for this was that at the Potsdam Conference it was discovered that the United States had better spy planes than the Soviet Union. He was interrogated and tortured the next day, and again between 4 and 8 May 1946 by Lavrentiy Beria before being forced to read a confession to the Politburo implicating Zhukov. Novikov was tried by the Military Collegium and sentenced to fifteen years in a labour camp.

Novikov was released on 29 June 1953, six years into his sentence following Stalin's death, and reinstated as chief marshal of aviation, where he was able to put his ideas into practice. A plan for using newly available jet aircraft and nuclear weapons to wage a possible future war with the United States was laid out by Novikov and shown to Nikita Khrushchev, who turned the proposal down in favor of ballistic missiles.

Following his retirement in 1958, Novikov accepted an offer to become head of the Higher Civil Aviation School in Leningrad, where he worked for ten years. He became a professor and was awarded the Order of the Red Banner of Labour in 1961.

In retirement, Novikov wrote a number of works on aviation and warfare, which were used to educate new Soviet air force pilots. He died, aged 76, on 3 December 1976.

== Honours and awards ==
Soviet Union

Hero of the Soviet Union, twice (№ 7277 - 17 April 1945) (№ 77 - 8 September 1945)
Order of Lenin, thrice (17 May 1940, 21 February 1945, 17 April 1945)
Order of the Red Banner, three times (22 October 1941, 3 November 1944, 3 November 1953)
Order of Suvorov, 1st class, thrice (28 February 1943, 1 June 1944, 19 August 1944)
Order of Kutuzov, 1st class (29 July 1944)
Order of the Red Banner of Labour (15 September 1961)
Order of the Red Star, twice (28 October 1967, 22 February 1968)
Medal "For the Defence of Stalingrad" (1942)
Medal "For the Defence of the Caucasus" (1944)
Medal "For the Defence of Moscow" (1944)
Medal "For the Defence of Leningrad" (1942)
Medal "For the Capture of Königsberg" (1945)
Medal "For the Liberation of Warsaw" (1945)
Medal "For the Capture of Berlin" (1945)
Medal "For the Victory over Germany in the Great Patriotic War 1941–1945" (1945)
Medal "For the Victory over Japan" (1945)
Jubilee Medal "Twenty Years of Victory in the Great Patriotic War 1941–1945" (1965)
Jubilee Medal "Thirty Years of Victory in the Great Patriotic War 1941–1945" (1975)
Jubilee Medal "In Commemoration of the 100th Anniversary of the Birth of Vladimir Ilyich Lenin" (1969)
Jubilee Medal "XX Years of the Workers' and Peasants' Red Army" (1938)
Jubilee Medal "30 Years of the Soviet Army and Navy" (1948)
Jubilee Medal "40 Years of the Armed Forces of the USSR" (1958)
Jubilee Medal "50 Years of the Armed Forces of the USSR" (1968)
Medal "In Commemoration of the 800th Anniversary of Moscow" (1947)
Medal "In Commemoration of the 250th Anniversary of Leningrad" (1957)
Medal "Veteran of the Armed Forces of the USSR" (1976)

Foreign

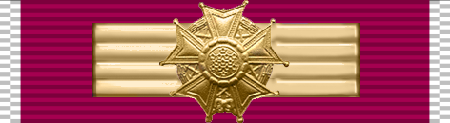
Legion of Honour, Grand Officer (France)
Croix de Guerre (France)
Order of the Red Banner (Mongolia)
Order of Military Merit (Mongolia)
Medal "50 Years of the Mongolian People's Revolution" (Mongolia)
Medal "60 Years of the Mongolian People's Army" (Mongolia)
Chief Commander of the Legion of Merit (United States)

== Notes ==
Military offices
Preceded by Pavel Fyodorovich Zhigarev	Soviet Air Force (VVS) Commander; Spring 1942 – April 1946	Succeeded by Konstantin Andreevich Vershinin
