= List of Bristol Blenheim operators =

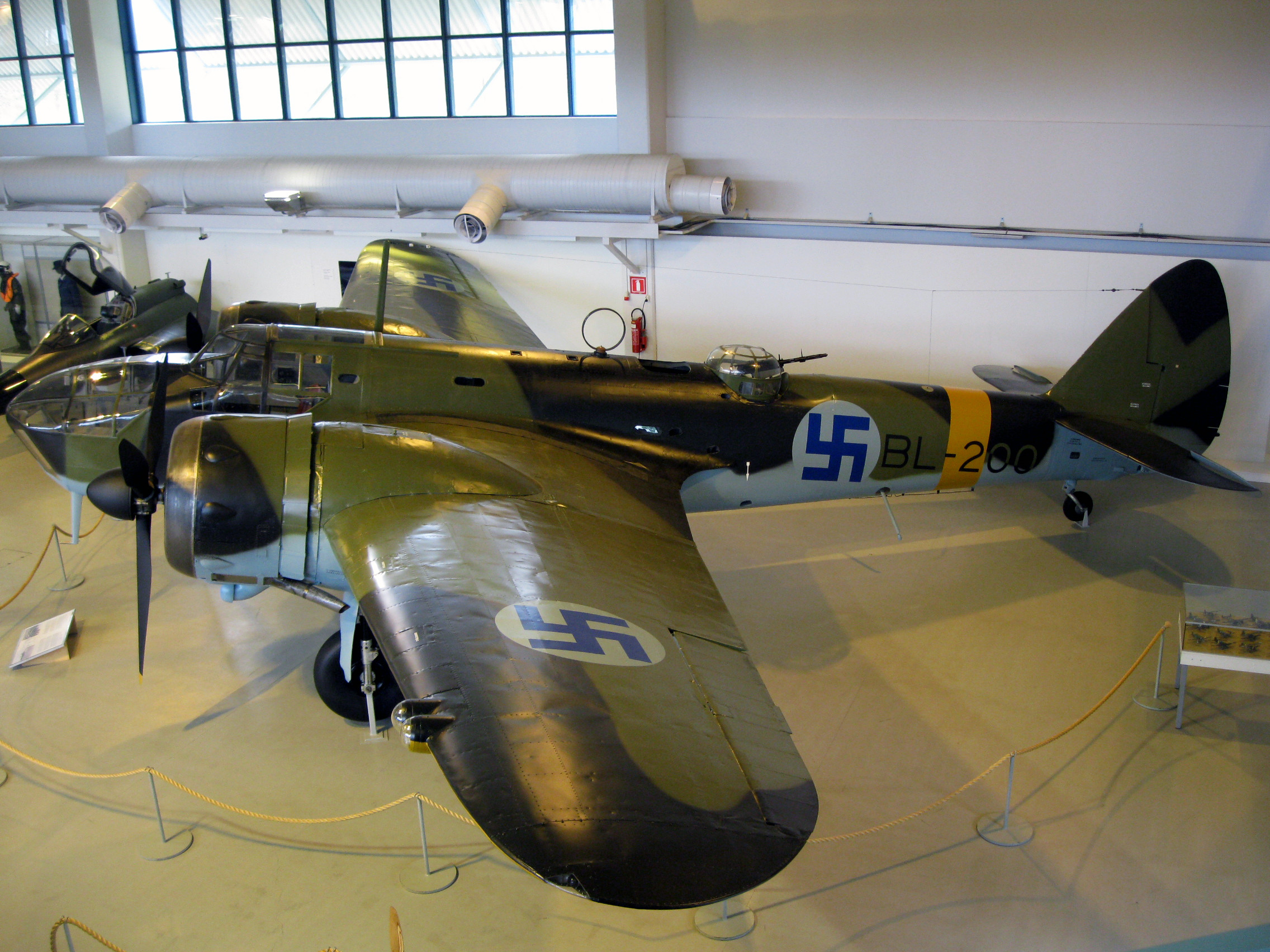
- A Finnish Blenheim Mk IV

The following are units which operated the Bristol Blenheim:

== Operators ==
=== Australia ===
Royal Australian Air Force

- No. 454 Squadron RAAF
- No. 459 Squadron RAAF

=== Canada ===
Royal Canadian Air Force

- Article XV squadrons serving under direct command and control of the RAF, with RAF owned aircraft.
  - No. 404 Squadron RCAF used Blenheim IVF (Apr 41 - Jan 43) with Coastal Command.
  - No. 406 Squadron RCAF used Blenheim I and IV (May 41 - Jun 41) as night fighters.
  - No. 407 Squadron RCAF used Blenheim IV (May 41 - Jul 41) while working up to operational status with Coastal Command.

=== Independent State of Croatia ===
Zrakoplovstvo Nezavisne Države Hrvatske

Eight captured ex-Royal Yugoslav Air Force Mk I aircraft were acquired by the ZNDH from the Germans after the April invasion in 1941. Several survived to the end of the War, with one retreating to Klagenfurt Austria upon the collapse of the Independent State of Croatia (NDH) in May 1945.

=== Finland ===
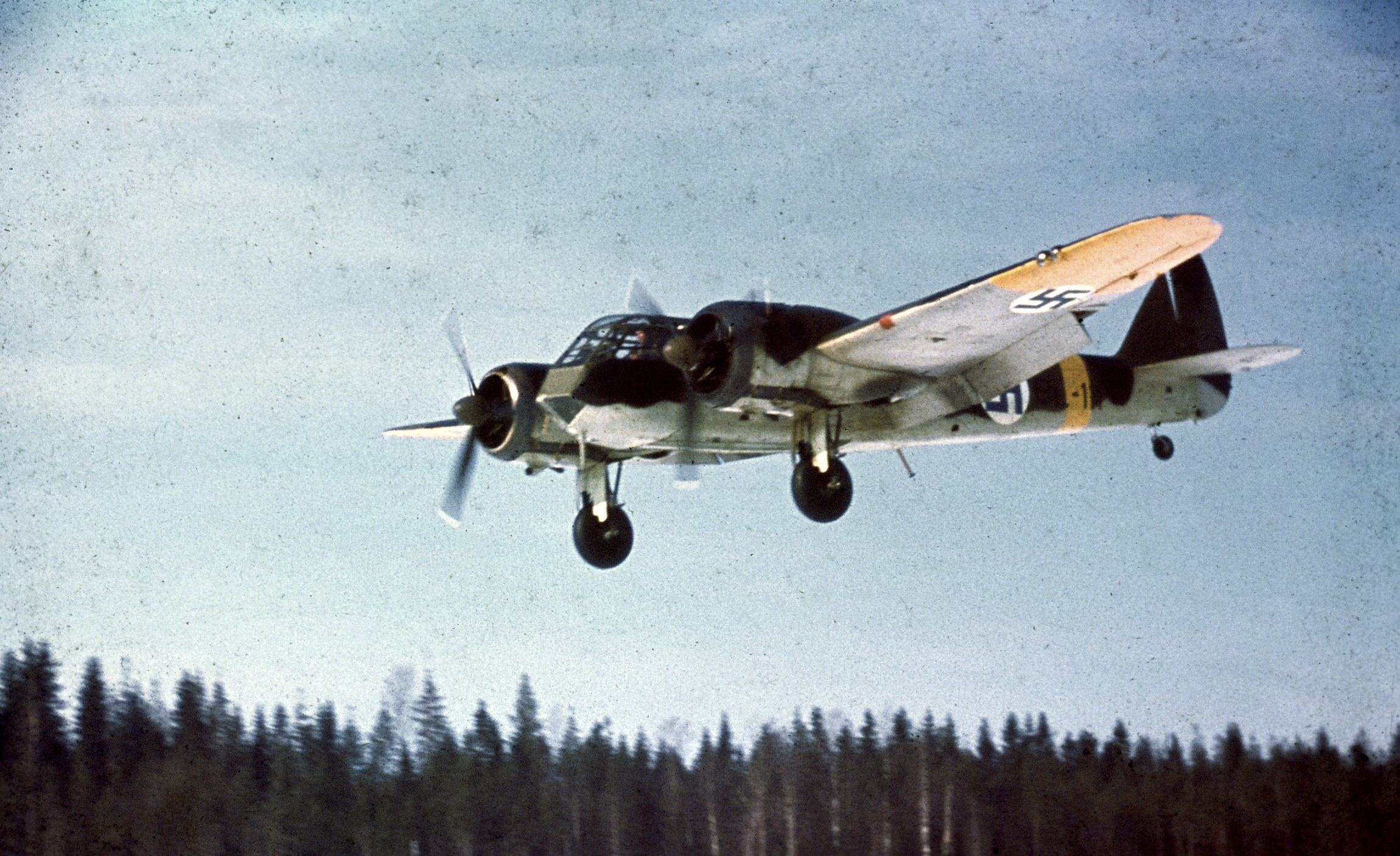
Bristol Blenheim of the Finnish Air Force. Photo taken in March, 1944.

Finnish Air Force

Finland was the first export order for the Blenheim and 18 Mark Is were delivered between 29 July 1937 and 27 July 1938. A licence to local produce the aircraft was granted in April 1938 but none of the 15 ordered from State Aircraft Factory were delivered before the Russian invasion. Twelve new Mark IVs were diverted from RAF production and these were followed by 12 former RAF Mark Is.

- No. 41 Squadron
- No. 42 Squadron
- No. 43 Squadron
- No. 44 Squadron
- No. 45 Squadron
- No. 46 Squadron
- No. 48 Squadron

=== Free France ===
Free French Air Force

- No. 342 Squadron RAF

=== Nazi Germany ===
Luftwaffe

One damaged Blenheim Mk IV was captured during Battle of France in 1940. It was later repaired and used as special training aircraft from 1940 until 1942.

=== Greece ===
Hellenic Air Force

The Hellenic Air Force in its campaigns against Italy and Germany in 1940 and 1941, operated 12 Mk IVs (delivered before WWII without sights, bomb racks, wireless radios and intercoms) and 6 Mk Is (delivered in February 1941). In the Middle East, the Hellenic Air Force operated 19 Mk IVs (from January 1942 till January 1943) and 31 Mk Vs (from January 1943 till September 1943).

=== India ===
Royal Indian Air Force

=== Indonesia ===
Indonesian Air Force

One Blenheim Mk IV was captured during the Indonesian National Revolution from the IJAAF. It was re-engined with Nakajima Sakae engines.

=== Italy ===
Regia Aeronautica

Blenheim Mk.IV N3589 of No. 40 Squadron RAF landed in error at Pantelleria on 13 September 1940 and was evaluated at Guidonia airfield near Rome. One more was captured in Yugoslavia while two were seized in Italian East Africa but were recaptured when this territory fell into British hands. N3589 might be the Mk.IV appearing in a non-flying role in the movie Un Pilota Ritorna (1942) directed by Roberto Rossellini.

=== Japan ===
Imperial Japanese Army Air Service

At least one Blenheim Mk I and two Blenheim Mk IV wrecks were discovered in Semarang, Java in August 1947. It was either captured during the Malayan campaign or the Dutch East Indies campaign.

=== New Zealand ===
Royal New Zealand Air Force

- No. 489 Squadron RNZAF

=== Poland ===
Polish Air Forces in Great Britain

- No. 307 Polish Night Fighter Squadron operated four aircraft of Mk Is and Mk IVs variants as trainers and hacks.
- One Blenheim IV rebuild to VIP transport variant was used as personal transport aircraft of the General Władysław Anders, commander of 2nd Polish Corps

=== Portugal ===
Portuguese Air Force
Portuguese Naval Aviation

=== Romania ===
Royal Romanian Air Force

In 1939, Romania bought 40 Blenheim Mk.Is from Britain, but only 37 aircraft arrived in the country. The first airplane was fitted with double controls. The first aircraft were assigned to the 1st Long Range Reconnaissance Squadron of the 2nd Guard Aviation Flotilla. A further three long range reconnaissance squadrons were equipped with Blenheims. The four squadrons carried out reconnaissance missions along the Hungarian, Bulgarian and Soviet borders. In January 1941, another 3 captured ex-Royal Yugoslav Air Force Blenheims were purchased from Germany.

At the start of Operation Barbarossa, some of the first missions were carried out by the long range reconnaissance squadrons. The first loss of the Royal Romanian Air Force during the war was also a Bristol Blenheim. By the end of the year, six aircraft were lost. In September of the same year, the aircraft were up-armoured by the Malaxa factory. After 1941, the remaining Blenheims were transferred to the 3rd Bomber Flotilla. By August 1942, only 27 airplanes remained in service. These further participated in the Battle of Stalingrad. Three aircraft were lost by the end of December 1942. The few serviceable Blenheims mostly flew missions over the Black Sea coast throughout 1943. At the beginning of 1945, the remaining aircraft were withdrawn from frontline use, but they were kept in service until 1948.

=== South Africa ===
South African Air Force

- No. 15 Squadron SAAF

=== Turkey ===
Turkish Air Force

=== United Kingdom ===
Royal Air Force

- No. 6 Squadron RAF
- No. 8 Squadron RAF
- No. 11 Squadron RAF
- No. 13 Squadron RAF
- No. 14 Squadron RAF
- No. 15 Squadron RAF
- No. 17 Squadron RAF
- No. 18 Squadron RAF
- No. 20 Squadron RAF
- No. 21 Squadron RAF
- No. 23 Squadron RAF
- No. 25 Squadron RAF
- No. 27 Squadron RAF
- No. 29 Squadron RAF
- No. 30 Squadron RAF
- No. 34 Squadron RAF
- No. 35 Squadron RAF
- No. 39 Squadron RAF
- No. 40 Squadron RAF
- No. 42 Squadron RAF
- No. 44 Squadron RAF
- No. 45 Squadron RAF
- No. 52 Squadron RAF
- No. 53 Squadron RAF
- No. 55 Squadron RAF
- No. 57 Squadron RAF
- No. 59 Squadron RAF
- No. 60 Squadron RAF
- No. 61 Squadron RAF
- No. 62 Squadron RAF
- No. 64 Squadron RAF
- No. 68 Squadron RAF
- No. 82 Squadron RAF
- No. 84 Squadron RAF
- No. 86 Squadron RAF
- No. 88 Squadron RAF
- No. 90 Squadron RAF
- No. 92 Squadron RAF
- No. 101 Squadron RAF
- No. 103 Squadron RAF
- No. 104 Squadron RAF
- No. 105 Squadron RAF
- No. 107 Squadron RAF
- No. 108 Squadron RAF
- No. 110 Squadron RAF
- No. 113 Squadron RAF
- No. 114 Squadron RAF
- No. 139 Squadron RAF
- No. 140 Squadron RAF
- No. 141 Squadron RAF
- No. 142 Squadron RAF
- No. 143 Squadron RAF
- No. 144 Squadron RAF
- No. 145 Squadron RAF
- No. 150 Squadron RAF
- No. 162 Squadron RAF
- No. 173 Squadron RAF
- No. 203 Squadron RAF
- No. 211 Squadron RAF
- No. 212 Squadron RAF
- No. 218 Squadron RAF
- No. 219 Squadron RAF
- No. 222 Squadron RAF
- No. 223 Squadron RAF
- no. 224 Squadron RAF
- No. 226 Squadron RAF
- No. 229 Squadron RAF
- No. 233 Squadron RAF
- No. 234 Squadron RAF
- No. 235 Squadron RAF
- No. 236 Squadron RAF
- No. 242 Squadron RAF
- No. 244 Squadron RAF
- No. 245 Squadron RAF
- No. 248 Squadron RAF
- No. 252 Squadron RAF
- No. 254 Squadron RAF
- No. 267 Squadron RAF
- No. 272 Squadron RAF
- No. 285 Squadron RAF
- No. 287 Squadron RAF
- No. 288 Squadron RAF
- No. 289 Squadron RAF
- No. 353 Squadron RAF
- No. 500 Squadron RAF
- No. 516 Squadron RAF
- No. 521 Squadron RAF
- No. 526 Squadron RAF
- No. 527 Squadron RAF
- No. 528 Squadron RAF
- No. 600 Squadron RAF
- No. 601 Squadron RAF
- No. 604 Squadron RAF
- No. 608 Squadron RAF
- No. 614 Squadron RAF

Fleet Air Arm

- 748 Naval Air Squadron
- 759 Naval Air Squadron
- 762 Naval Air Squadron
- 770 Naval Air Squadron
- 771 Naval Air Squadron
- 772 Naval Air Squadron
- 775 Naval Air Squadron
- 776 Naval Air Squadron
- 780 Naval Air Squadron
- 787 Naval Air Squadron
- 788 Naval Air Squadron
- 798 Naval Air Squadron

Aeroplane & Armament Experimental Establishment
Royal Aircraft Establishment

=== Yugoslavia ===
Royal Yugoslav Air Force

The Royal Yugoslav Air Force acquired 24 Mk I aircraft from RAF stocks and subsequently undertook a licensed production run of some 36 aircraft. Tooling up for the production of the Mk IV was about to commence when interrupted by the Invasion of Yugoslavia in April 1941. Some 20 partly completed airframes, as well as production tools and spare parts were subsequently sold by Germany to Finland.

== See also ==
- Bristol Blenheim
