= Ilyushin DB-3 =

1935 bomber aircraft family

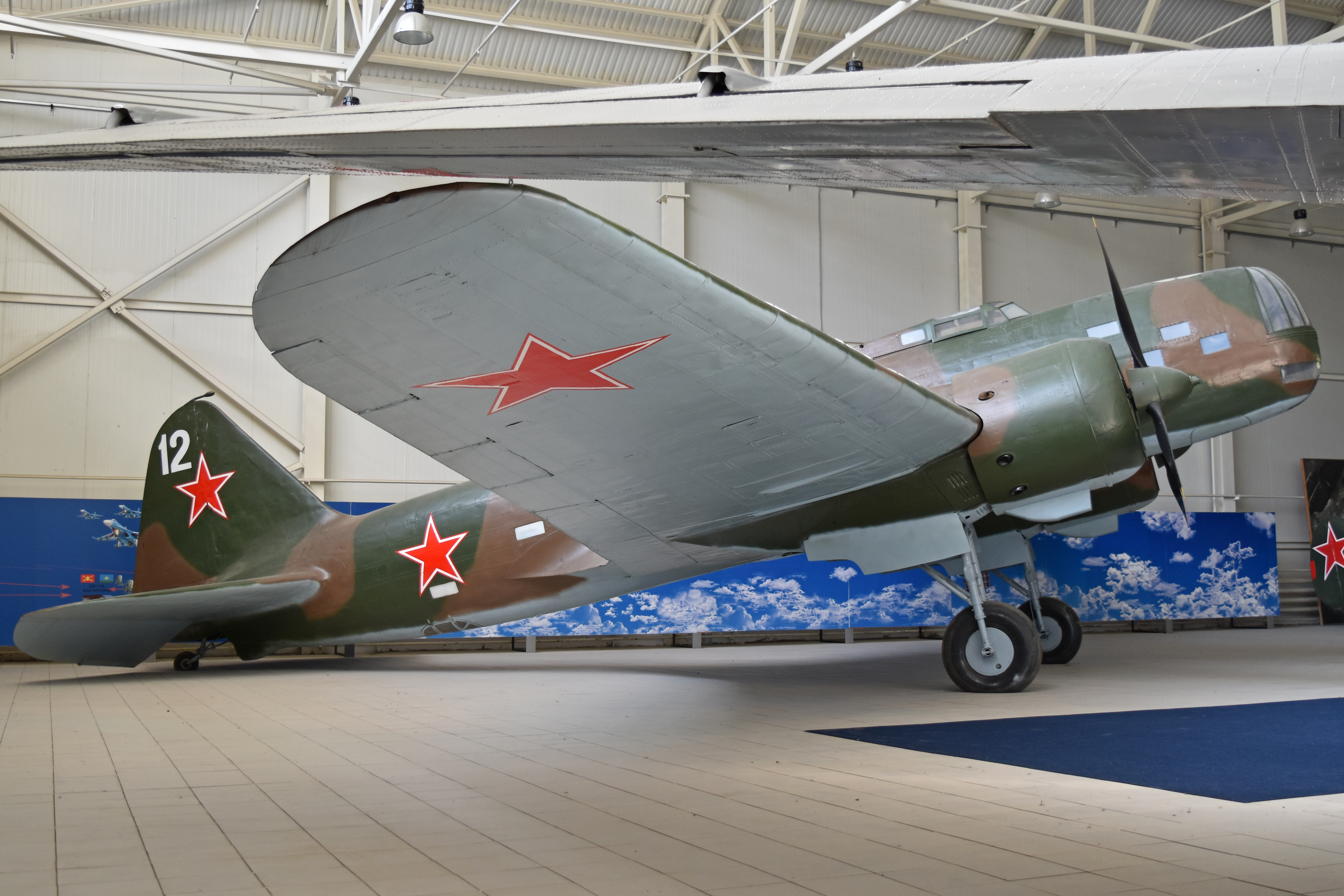
- A DB-3M at the Central Air Force Museum near Moscow, Russia.

General information
- Type: Medium bomber / torpedo-bomber
- Manufacturer: Ilyushin
- Primary users: Soviet Air Forces (VVS) Republic of China Air Force; Finnish Air Force
- Number built: 1,528

History
- Manufactured: 1936–1939
- First flight: Summer 1935
- Variant: Ilyushin Il-4

The Ilyushin DB-3, where "DB" stands for Dalniy Bombardirovshchik (Russian: Дальний бомбардировщик) meaning "long-range bomber", is a Soviet bomber aircraft of World War II. It was a twin-engined, low-wing monoplane that first flew in 1935. 1,528 were built. The DB-3 was the precursor of the Ilyushin Il-4 (originally designated DB-3F).

== Design and development ==
The genesis of the DB-3 lay in the BB-2, Sergey Ilyushin's failed competitor to the Tupolev SB. Ilyushin was able to salvage the work and time invested in the BB-2's design by recasting it as a long-range bomber, again competing against a Tupolev design, the DB-2, to meet the stringent requirements of an aircraft capable of delivering a 1,000 kg (2,200 lb) bombload to a range of 3,000 km (1,900 mi) at a maximum speed no less than 350 km/h (220 mph). He had redesigned the BB-2 to take advantage of the radial Gnome-Rhône Mistral Major 14Kdrs engine, for which the Soviets had purchased a license in 1934 as the M-85, and had begun construction of the prototype of the BB-2 2K-14 as the TsKB-26 that same year.

The TsKB-26 was more of a proof-of-concept vehicle to validate Ilyushin's ideas on how to obtain long range than an actual bomber prototype. To speed the construction process, it had a wooden fuselage and fin with metal wings and tail surfaces. It made its first flight in the summer of 1935 and proved to be stable, easily controllable and highly maneuverable; it performed the first loop made by a twin-engined aircraft in the Soviet Union. It went on to set six world records in its class, generally in payloads to height and speed over a 5,000 km (3,100 mi) closed circuit.

The real prototype of the DB-3 was called the TsKB-30 and it was completed in March 1936. It had a number of improvements over the TsKB-26, notably an all-metal structure, an extended nose, an aft-sliding canopy with a fixed windscreen and improved engine cowlings. It passed the State acceptance trials and was ordered into production in August 1936 as the DB-3, although some sources refer to this initial series as the DB-3S for seriynyy (series-built).

The DB-3 was not a simple or easy aircraft to manufacture as Ilyushin had pushed the limits of the available construction technology to make it as light as possible. For example, the spar in each wing panel had four parts which had to be riveted together and there were numerous welds that each had to be inspected by an X-ray machine, with many failures. In addition the internal riveting of small-diameter tubing was also a difficult and time-consuming process.

The bomb bay was designed to carry ten 100 kg (220 lb) FAB-100 bombs, but heavier bombs could be accommodated on external bomb racks up to a total of 2,500 kg (5,500 lb) on short-range missions. The defensive armament for the three crewmen consisted of three 7.62 mm (0.3 in) ShKAS machine guns. One in the tip of the nose manned by the bombardier-navigator and the two others protecting the rear. The rear gunner manned both the gun in the SU dorsal turret and the gun in an LU ventral hatch.

Flight tests of the second example pre-production aircraft, conducted May–October 1937, revealed that it was slightly inferior to the TsKB-30 in performance, but still exceeded its requirements by a considerable margin. It attained a speed of 390 km/h (240 mph) at an altitude of 5,000 m (16,000 ft). It could carry a bombload of 500 kg (1,100 lb) to a range of 4,000 km (2,500 mi) and a 1,000 kg (2,200 lb) bombload to a range of 3,100 km (1,900 mi). In comparison, the Heinkel He 111B then in production was 10–20 km/h (6.2–12.4 mph) slower and could carry only 750 kg (1,650 lb) of bombs to a range of 1,660 km (1,030 mi) and 1,500 kg (3,300 lb) to a distance of 910 km (570 mi). This performance arguably made it the best twin-engined bomber in the world already or entering service in 1937. 45 DB-3s were built that year at Factory No. 39 in Moscow and No. 18 in Voronezh and the aircraft entered service with the VVS.

During 1938 the improved M-86 engine, rated at 950 horsepower (710 kW) for takeoff, replaced the M-85 on the production line. Aircraft with this engine are properly referred to as DB-3 2M-86, but are sometimes referred to as the DB-3A, after the three-step upgrade program planned for the aircraft. Other minor changes were introduced over the course of the year. Factory No. 126 in Komsomolsk-on-Amur also began producing DB-3s in 1938.

During 1938–39 the Tumansky M-87A engine was introduced on the production line in a gradual transition as were VISh-3 variable-pitch propellers. The M-87 had the same horsepower rating at takeoff as the M-86, but produced more power at higher altitudes. The M-87B further increased power at altitude and was introduced in 1939–40. These aircraft were known as the DB-3B as part of the second stage of the upgrade program. The last production batches in 1940 had the Tumansky M-88 that produced 1,100 horsepower (820 kW) for takeoff. These increased the maximum speed to 429 km/h (267 mph) at 6,800 metres (22,300 ft).

=== Nomenclature ===
Great confusion exists in the sources, including original Soviet documents, about the names commonly used for the DB-3. Formally the Soviet designation system used a two-letter abbreviation to designate the role of the aircraft, then a number for the model in that sequence followed by the number of engines, and the engine used. So SB 2M-100A is decoded as twin-engined fast bomber, first in the series, equipped with M-100A engines. Shorter abbreviations were informally used, but the use of them is not consistent between sources. For example, the listing for the strength of the VVS on 1 June 1941 shows a mixture of DB-3A and DB-3 aircraft, with the former predominating.

== Operational history ==
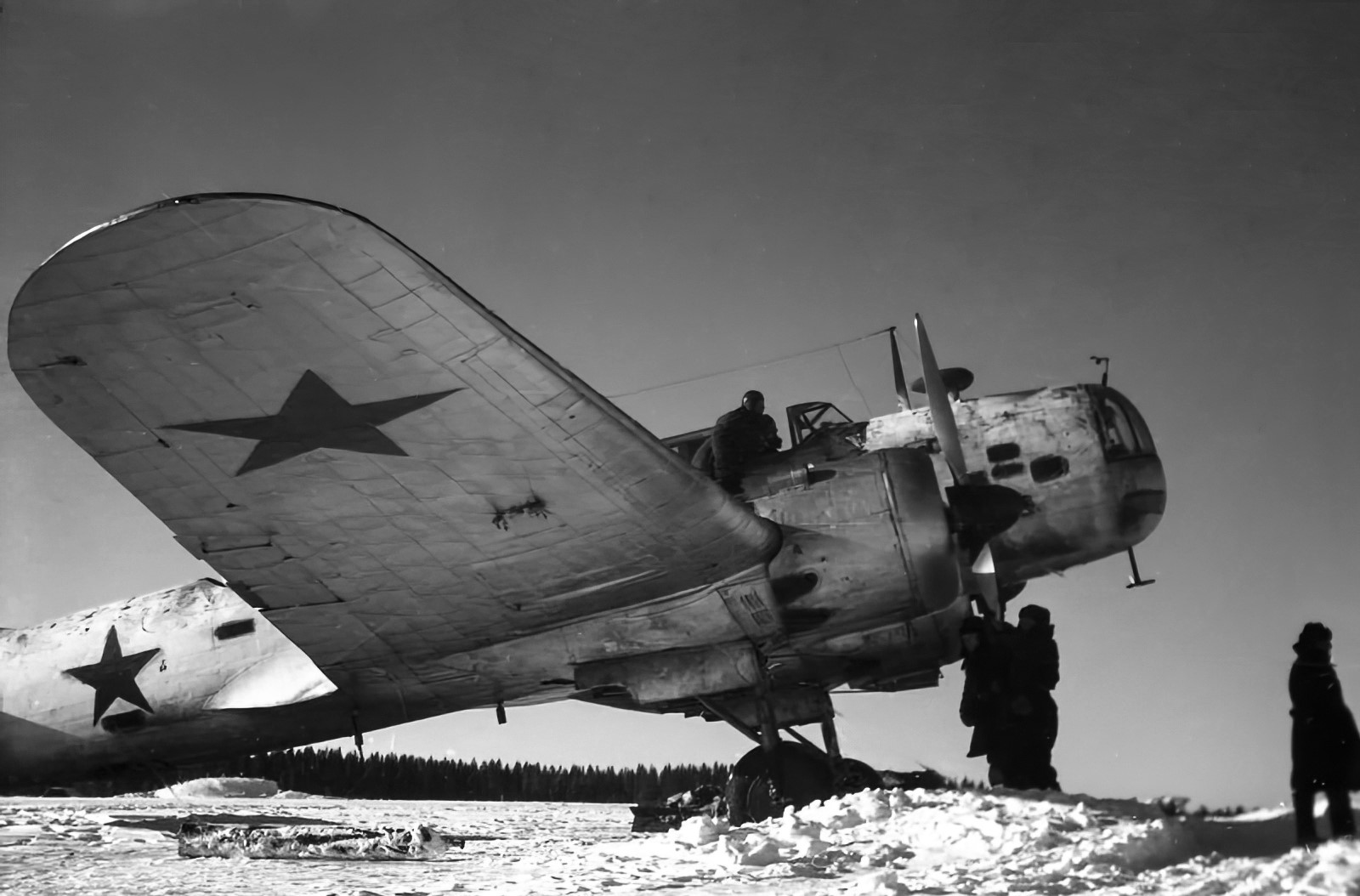
DB-3B serving in the Baltic fleet

In 1939, 30 DB-3s were supplied to the Republic of China Air Force during the Second Sino-Japanese War and they saw heavy action against Japanese targets in the Wuhan region from their bases in Sichuan (mostly used by the 8th Group), before being replaced by B-24 Liberators in 1943.

Two DB-3s were responsible for shooting down the neutral Finnish civilian Junkers Ju 52 passenger and transport plane Kaleva on June 14, 1940.

The Finns captured five force-landed DB-3Ms during the Winter War and during 1941 they purchased a further six DB-3Ms and four DB-3F/Il-4s from German surplus stocks.

On the night of August 7–8, 1941, fifteen DB-3T torpedo bombers of the Baltic Fleet dropped the first Soviet bombs on Berlin. From August 11, DB-3Fs of the VVS resumed bombing.

== Achievements ==
- On June 27–28, 1938, the crew consisting of pilot Vladimir Kokkinaki and navigator Alexander Bryandinsky made a non-stop flight from Moscow to the Far East (Spassk-Dalny, Primorsky Krai) with a length of 7580 kilometers (6850 kilometers in a straight line) on the plane TsKB-30 "Moscow".
- On April 28, 1939, a crew consisting of pilot Vladimir Kokkinaki and navigator Mikhail Gordienko made the first transatlantic non-stop flight from Moscow to the East Coast of North America (Miscou Island, New Brunswick, Canada) on the TsKB-30 "Moscow". The TsKB-30 flew almost 8000 km in 22 hours 56 minutes at an average speed of 348 km/h.
- On July 27, 1940 on the plane TsKB-30N-2 "Ukraina" an all-female crew consisting of the first pilot Mariya Nesterenko, co-pilot Maria Mikhalyova and navigator Nina Rusakova made a non-stop flight on the route Khabarovsk-Lviv (the pilots traveled about 7000 km in 22.5 hours).

== Variants ==
TsKB-26
Proof-of-concept prototype
TsKB-30
First real prototype. Later modified, including removal of armament, for long-range record attempts as the "Moskva". It flew from Moscow to Spassk-Dalny (7,580 km (4,710 mi)) in 24 h 36 min (an average speed of 307 km/h (191 mph)) mostly at 7,000 m (23,000 ft) under control of Vladimir Kokkinaki and A. M. Berdyanskij, then from Moscow to Miscou Island (New Brunswick, Canada) in 22 h 56 min. covering 8,000 km (5,000 mi) at 348 km/h (216 mph) average airspeed (Kokkinaki and Mikhail Gordienko).
DB-3 2M-85
Initial production model
DB-3 2M-86 (DB-3A)
Engines upgraded to M-86, other minor changes
DB-3 2M-87A (DB-3B)
Engines upgraded to the Tumansky M-87A
DB-3T (TsKB-53)
Torpedo bomber built in 1938, with either the M-86 or M-87 engine, armed with 45-36-AN or 45-36-AV torpedoes.
DB-3TP (TsKB-51)
Seaplane torpedo bomber built in 1938. No production.
DB-3M
First major upgrade powered by two M-87B or M-88 engines.
DB-3F
Replaced DB-3 in 1940-1944, see Il-4.
TsKB-54
Escort aircraft ("air cruiser"), 1938. Not accepted for service.
TsKB-56
Bigger variant from 1940 with changed configuration (higher wing, twin-tail) and powered by two AM-37 engines. Cancelled, after two prototypes were built, in favour of the Yer-2.
DB-4
Production designation of the TsKB-56, which did not progress further than the two prototypes.
Il-4
The DB-3F was redesignated Il-4 in 1942
Il-6
Long-range bomber version powered by either 2 x Charomskiy ACh-30 diesel engines, or 2 x M-90 radial engines.

== Operators ==
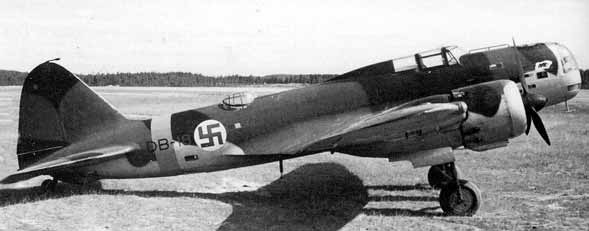
DB-3M in Finnish markings

China

- Chinese Nationalist Air Force

Finland

- Finnish Air Force
  - Lentolaivue 46
  - Lentolaivue 48

Nazi Germany

- Luftwaffe

Soviet Union

- Soviet Air Force
- Soviet Naval Aviation

== Survivors ==
The only known surviving DB-3 is currently displayed at the Central Air Force Museum at Monino, near Moscow, Russia. The aircraft was found in taiga forests, 120 km from Komsomolsk-on-Amur. It was recovered in September 1988 and brought to the Irkutsk Aircraft Industrial Association (IAIA) factory on board an Ilyushin Il-76 transport. After over a year of restoration, the aircraft was delivered to Monino on board an Antonov An-22. On 22 December 1989, representatives of IAIA, headed by V.P. Zelenkov, handed over the DB-3 to museum officials.

This aircraft should not be confused with the Ilyushin Il-4 (cn 17404) exhibited in the Victory Park collection of the Museum of the Great Patriotic War, Moscow.

== Specifications (DB-3B, late production) ==
Ilyushin DB-3 3-view drawing

General characteristics

- Crew: 3
- Length: 14.22 m (46 ft 8 in)
- Wingspan: 21.44 m (70 ft 4 in)
- Height: 4.19 m (13 ft 9 in)
- Wing area: 65.6 m^{2} (706 sq ft)
- Empty weight: 5,030 kg (11,089 lb)
- Gross weight: 7,745 kg (17,075 lb)
- Max takeoff weight: 9,450 kg (20,834 lb)
- Powerplant: 2 × Nazarov M-87 9-cyl. air-cooled radial engines, 709 kW (951 hp) each

Performance

- Maximum speed: 439 km/h (273 mph, 237 kn)
- Range: 3,800 km (2,400 mi, 2,100 nmi)
- Service ceiling: 9,600 m (31,500 ft)
- Rate of climb: 6.93 m/s (1,364 ft/min)
- Wing loading: 118 kg/m^{2} (24 lb/sq ft)
- Power/mass: 0.18 kW/kg (0.11 hp/lb)

Armament

- 3 × 7.62 mm ShKAS machine guns
- 1 × 20 mm ShVAK cannon (not always fitted)
- Up to 2,500 kg (5,500 lb) of bombs

== See also ==
Related development

- Ilyushin Il-4
- Ilyushin Il-6

Aircraft of comparable role, configuration, and era

- Douglas B-18 Bolo
- Heinkel He 111
- IAR 79
- Mitsubishi G4M
- PZL.37 Łoś
- Vickers Wellington

Related lists

- List of bomber aircraft
- 1941: Wings Over Berlin a 2022 film about DB-3 aircraft.

== Bibliography ==
- Gordon, Yefim; Khazanov, Dmitri (April 1999). Soviet Combat Aircraft of the Second World War. Vol. 2: Twin-Engined Fighters, Attack Aircraft and Bombers. Earl Shilton, UK: Midland Publishing Ltd. ISBN 1-85780-084-2.
- Gordon, Yefim; Komissarov, Dmitriy and Sergey (2004). OKB Ilyushin: A History of the Design Bureau and its Aircraft. London: Ian Allan. ISBN 1-85780-187-3.
- Keskinen, Kalevi; Stenman, Kari; Niska, Klaus (1982). Venäläiset Pommittajat (Soviet Bombers). Suomen Ilmavoimien Historia. Vol. 9. Espoo, Finland: Tietoteos. ISBN 952-99432-7-X.
- Nowarra, Heinz J.; Duval, G.R (1971). Russian Civil and Military Aircraft, 1884-1969. London: Fountain Press. ISBN 0-85242-460-4.
- Stapfer, Hans-Heiri (2004). Ilyushin Il-4 in Action. Aircraft. Vol. 192. Carrollton, Texas: Squadron/Signal Publications. ISBN 0-89747-471-6.
