= Ilyushin DB-4 =

General information
- Type: Long-range bomber
- National origin: Soviet Union
- Manufacturer: Ilyushin OKB
- Number built: 2

History
- First flight: 15 October 1940
- Developed from: Ilyushin DB-3

The Ilyushin DB-4 (DB - Дальний бомбардировщик - Dalniy Bombardirovshchik - long-range bomber) or TsKB-56 (TsKB - Tsentral'noye Konstruktorskoye Byuro - central construction bureau) was a Soviet twin-engined bomber aircraft of the early 1940s. It was a development of the Ilyushin DB-3 and was intended as a replacement for the earlier aircraft, but only two prototypes were built; engine problems and the need to concentrate production on existing types following the German invasion of the Soviet Union in June 1941 meant that no more examples were built.

== Design and development ==
In the late 1930s, the Ilyushin OKB (or design bureau) was tasked with designing a replacement for its DB-3 twin-engined, long-range bomber. Ilyushin carried out design work on the new aircraft, which was given the internal design bureau designation TsKB-56, in parallel with the DB-3F (later designated the Il-4). While the DB-3F was a relatively simple upgrade of the DB-3, the TsKB-56, which had the service designation DB-3, was larger and heavier, in order to meet the requirements for greater performance and a heavier bombload. The DB-4 had a high-mounted wing to accommodate a large bomb bay, with a retractable tailwheel undercarriage fitted, while the radial engines of the DB-3 were to be replaced by the new Klimov M-120, an 18-cylinder liquid-cooled engine of unusual design, with three banks of six cylinders arranged in an inverted "Y"-shape, which was to have a takeoff power of 1,800 hp (1,346 kW). It was to have a crew of four consisting of a pilot, navigator, dorsal gunner and radio operator. Defensive armament was three ShKAS machine guns, one in the nose, one in a dorsal turret and one firing through a ventral hatch, while the deep bomb bay could carry 1,000 kg (2,200 lb) of bombs.

The proposed M-120 engines proved to be troublesome, and it was decided to replace them with 1,400 hp (1,044 kW) Mikulin AM-37 V12 engines to allow testing of the first prototype to be completed. This aircraft, fitted with a single vertical fin, made its maiden flight on 15 October 1940, with test pilot Vladimir Kokkinaki at its controls. The second aircraft, with twin tails, was completed in November 1940 with M-120 engines, but these were replaced with AM-37s before it flew on 20 February 1941.

Flight testing showed that the aircraft had poor low speed stability, while the fuselage, with its large bomb bay was prone to flexing, resulting in larger tail surfaces being fitted and the fuselage being strengthened. The AM-37 engines, while a development of the earlier AM-35 engine, proved to be unreliable, and plans were made to fit alternative engines, including the Shvetsov M-71 and M-82 radial engines and the Charomskiy ACh-30 Diesel engine, although none of these alternatives were fitted. The German invasion of the Soviet Union in 1941 lead to an end of production of the DB-4, with the factory allocated for production evacuated from Moscow to the East, and ordered to concentrate on urgently needed Il-2 ground-attack aircraft and the Il-4 bomber. The two prototypes continued in use as testbeds to aid development of improved versions of the Il-4 and the later Ilyushin Il-6 bomber.

== Specifications ==
Data from The Osprey Encyclopedia of Russian Aircraft 1875–1995

General characteristics

- Crew: four
- Length: 17.85 m (58 ft 7 in)
- Wingspan: 25.0 m (82 ft 0 in)
- Wing area: 83.0 m^{2} (893 sq ft)
- Empty weight: 7,561 kg (16,669 lb)
- Gross weight: 10,860 kg (23,942 lb)
- Max takeoff weight: 13,006 kg (28,673 lb)
- Powerplant: 2 × Mikulin AM-37 liquid-cooled V12 engine, 1,000 kW (1,400 hp) each

Performance

- Maximum speed: 500 km/h (310 mph, 270 kn) at 6,000 m (19,700 ft)
- Range: 4,000 km (2,500 mi, 2,200 nmi)
- Service ceiling: 10,000 m (33,000 ft)

Armament

- Guns: 3 × 7.62 mm ShKAS machine guns (nose, dorsal and ventral positions)
- Bombs: 1,000 kg (2,200 lb ) normal (3,000 kg (6,600) maximum)
