= No. 17 Squadron (Finland) =

No. 17 Squadron Finnish Air Force
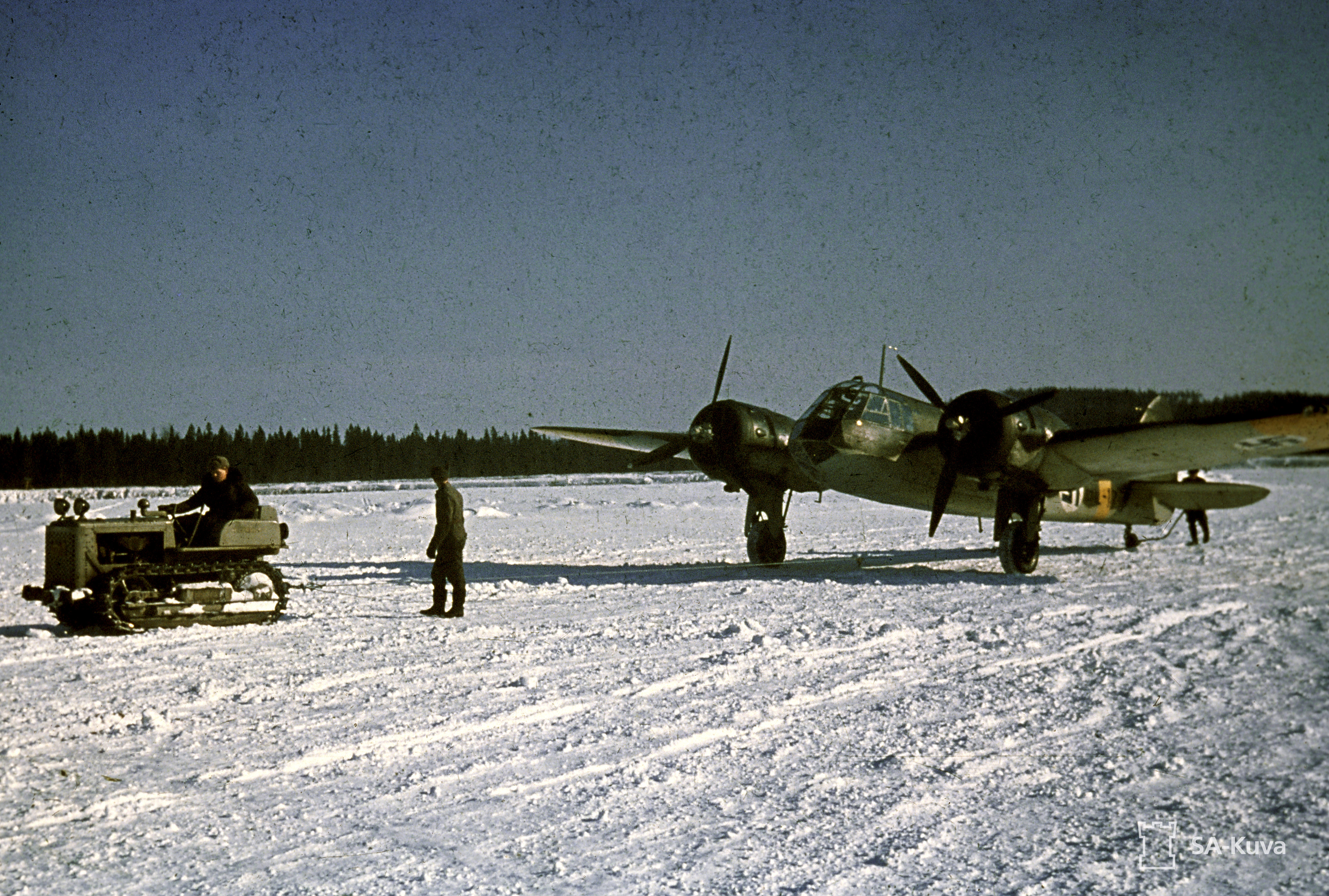
- A Bristol Blenheim is towed with a tractor. No. 17 Replenishment Squadron, 1944.
- Country: Finland
- Branch: Finnish Air Force
- Type: Replenishment
- Role: bomber
- Equipment: Bristol Blenheim
- Engagements: Continuation War

No. 17 Replenishment Squadron (Finnish: Täydennyslentolaivue 17 or T-LLv.17), was a replenishment bomber squadron of the Finnish Air Force during World War II. The No. 17 Sqn was part of Flying Regiment 4.

It trained pilots and crew for bomber aircraft. Most of the training was done with Bristol Blenheims. In September 1941, the squadron was integrated into No. 46 Squadron, before becoming an independent squadron again in March 1942.
