= DB-4 =

DB-4 may refer to:

- Ilyushin DB-4, a twin engined long-range bomber of the Great Patriotic War, built in the USSR
- Aston Martin DB4, a British touring sports car of the late 1950s
