= Konstantin Kokkinaki =

Soviet fighter and test pilot

- Born: 11 March 1910; Novorossiysk, Russian Empire
- Died: 4 March 1990 (aged 79); Moscow, Soviet Union
- Relatives: Vladimir Kokkinaki (brother)
- Military career
- Allegiance: Soviet Union
- Branch: Red Air Force
- Service years: 1932 - 1950
- Rank: Colonel
- Commands: 401st Special Fighter Regiment
- Conflicts: Second Sino-Japanese War; World War II
- Awards: Hero of the Soviet Union; Order of Lenin; Order of the Red Banner; Order of the Red Star

Konstantin Kokkinaki (Russian: Константин Константинович Коккинаки, 11 March 1910 - 4 March 1990) was a Soviet fighter and test pilot. He shot down a total of 14 enemy aircraft in the Second Sino-Japanese War and World War II. Following the end of the latter he tested dozens of new aircraft and set a new world flight airspeed record, for which he received the title of Hero of the Soviet Union. His older brother Vladimir Kokkinaki followed a similar career path, also achieving the title of Hero of the Soviet Union.

== Early life ==
Konstantin Kokkinaki was born on 11 March 1910, in Novorossiysk into a Pontic Greek family. He left school in 1925 after finishing the 7th grade, going on to work as a sailor in the Novorossiysk port. In 1929, he voluntarily enlisted into the Red Army after answering the call of the central committee of Komsomol. In 1931, he joined the Communist Party of the Soviet Union. In 1932, Kokkinaki graduated from the Stalingrad Military Aviation School. He went on to serve as a pilot in the Red Air Force, becoming a test pilot in 1939.

== Career ==
On the same year Kokkinaki became a member of the Soviet Volunteer Group a unit of pilots fighting on the Chinese side in the Second Sino-Japanese War. Two squadrons of Polikarpov I-15 and Polikarpov I-16s assembled near Moscow, Stepan Suprun was appointed as their commander with Kokkinaki acting as his deputy. Once the planes reached Alma-Ata they were dismantled and loaded onto cars reaching China by traversing the Gobi Desert. The planes were reassembled at Hami and flown to Chongqing by way of Lanzhou. Kokkinaki's fighter squadron was tasked with defending the city from Japanese bombing raids until December when it was transferred to the south east of the country. On 10 January 1940, Kokkinaki shot down his seventh enemy aircraft. Soon afterwards his squadron returned to the Soviet Union, he remained in China in the capacity of a military advisor. During his time in China Kokkinaki flew 166 combat missions and was awarded a Chinese order.

In June 1941, Kokkinaki was dispatched to the front lines of World War II. He served as the deputy commander of the 401st Special Fighter Regiment which was composed of former test pilots. Upon Suprun's death Kokkinaki assumed his position at the head of the regiment. During the course of the war Kokkinaki claimed three individual and four more shared take downs. Kokkinaki retired from the air force in 1950 in the rank of colonel. He continued to work as a test pilot, testing dozens of new aircraft. In 1960, he broke the world flight airspeed record. On 21 August 1964, Kokkinaki was awarded the title of Hero of the Soviet Union for his achievements as a test and fighter pilot. Other decorations included two Orders of the Red Banner, three Orders of Lenin, three Orders of the Patriotic War first class, two Orders of the Red Star and the title Honoured Test Pilot of the USSR. Kokkinaki died in Moscow on 4 March 1990. His older brother Vladimir Kokkinaki followed a similar career path, also achieving the title of Hero of the Soviet Union and breaking numerous world speed records as a pilot.
