= Flying Regiment 4, Finnish Air Force =

- Active: 1 January 1938 - present
- Country: Finland
- Branch: Finnish Air Force
- Role: Bomber
- Engagements: Winter War, Continuation War, Lapland War

Flying Regiment 4 (Finnish: Lentorykmentti 4 or LeR 4) was a bomber aircraft regiment of the Finnish Air Force. The regiment was formed on 1 January 1938 and was active during the Winter War, the Continuation War, and the Lapland War. During the Winter War, the unit flew 423 war missions, of which 22 were strategic and photo reconnaissance flights with its Bristol Blenheim Mk.Is. 18 aircraft and 21 crew members were lost.

During the Continuation War the regiment was re-equipped with new Bristol Blenheims Mk.IVs, German Dornier Do 17Zs, Junkers Ju 88s, and Russian Ilyushin DB-3s, and Tupolev SBs. The unit could now mount some 50 aircraft in their largest raids. More than 4,000 missions were flown during the Continuation War. 65 aircraft and 165 crew members were lost.

During the Lapland War LeR 4 flew 462 missions against the Germans, losing 7 aircraft and 16 crew members.

== Organization ==
=== Winter War ===
- No. 42 Squadron: bomber squadron
- No. 44 Squadron: bomber squadron
- No. 46 Squadron: bomber squadron

=== Continuation War ===
- No. 42 Squadron: bomber squadron
- No. 44 Squadron: bomber squadron
- No. 46 Squadron: bomber squadron
- No. 48 Squadron: bomber squadron

=== Lapland War ===
- No. 42 Squadron: bomber squadron
- No. 44 Squadron: bomber squadron
- No. 46 Squadron: bomber squadron
- No. 48 Squadron: bomber squadron

After World War II, the regiment and its squadrons were re-organized and the new squadrons were renamed No. 41, No. 43, and No. 45 Squadrons.

== Aircraft ==
- Junkers Ju 88 A-4
- Dornier Do 17
- Bristol Blenheim I
- Bristol Blenheim IV
- Petlyakov Pe-2
- Ilyushin DB-3M
- Ilyushin Il-4
- Avro Anson

== Sources ==
- Keskinen, Kalevi and Stenman, Kari: Finnish Air Force 1939-1945, Squadron/Signal publications, Carrollton, Texas, 1998, ISBN 0-89747-387-6
- Keskinen, Kalevi & Stenman, Kari (2002). LeR 4: Lentolaivue 42, Lentolaivue 44, Lentolaivue 46, Lentolaivue 48. Suomen ilmavoimien historia. Vol. 19. Espoo, Finland: Kari Stenman. ISBN 951-98751-2-3.
- Shores, Christopher F. (1969). Finnish Air Force 1918–1968. Aircam Aviation Series. Vol. S2. Canterbury, UK: Osprey Publications. ISBN 0-85045-012-8.
