= Richky, Sumy Oblast =

Village in Sumy Oblast, Ukraine

Richky Річки
- Village
- Location of Richky in Sumy Oblast Location of Richky in Ukraine
- Coordinates: 51°07′07″N 34°29′49″E
- Country: Ukraine
- Oblast: Sumy Oblast
- Raion: Sumy Raion
- Hromada: Richky rural hromada
- Established: 1760s

Population
  - Total: 1,267

Richky (Ukrainian: Річки) is a village in Sumy Raion, in Ukraine's central Sumy Oblast. It is the administrative centre of Richky rural hromada, one of the hromadas of Ukraine. It has a population of 1,267 (as of 2024).

== History ==
Richky was founded at some point in the 1760s. The village participated in the Russian Revolution of 1905, and was occupied by the Red Army in December 1917. During World War II 932 residents joined the Red Army, and at least 459 villagers died during the occupation.

During the Russian invasion of Ukraine, Richky has been subjected to shelling by the Russian military on multiple occasions. On 24 March 2023 the village's gymnasium was destroyed.

== Notable people ==
- Mykola Lavrynenko, Red Army lieutenant-general, Soviet Ukrainian politician.
- Mykola Revenko, People's Deputy of Ukraine.
- Oleksandr Rovnyi, soldier of the Armed Forces of Ukraine killed during the War in Donbas.
- Stepan Suprun, Soviet aviator, Hero of the Soviet Union.
- Mykhailo Vynnychenko, Red Army sergeant
