= Vladimir Kokkinaki =

Soviet Union test pilot (1904–1985)

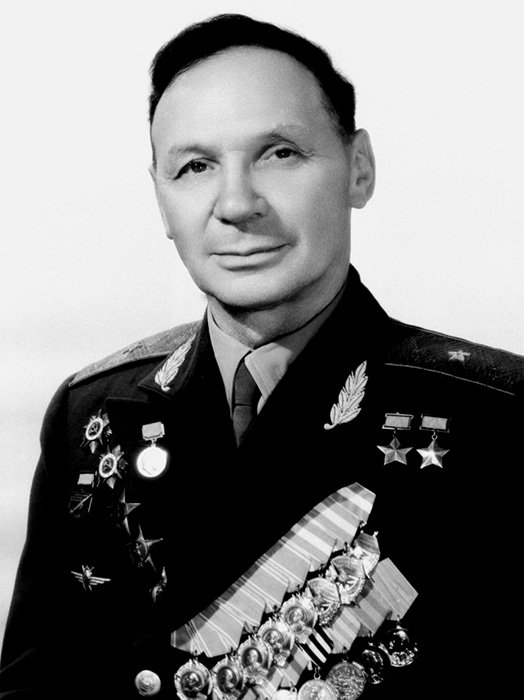
- Born: 25 June [O.S. 12 June] 1904; Novorossiysk, Russian Empire
- Died: 7 January 1985 (aged 80); Moscow, Soviet Union
- Military career
- Allegiance: Soviet Union
- Branch: Soviet Air Force
- Service years: 1925–1966
- Rank: Major General of Aviation
- Awards: Hero of the Soviet Union (twice)

Vladimir Konstantinovich Kokkinaki (Russian: Владимир Константинович Коккинаки; 25 June [O.S. 12 June] 1904 – 7 January 1985) was a test pilot in the Soviet Union, notable for setting twenty-two world records and serving as president of the Fédération Aéronautique Internationale.

== Early life ==
Kokkinaki was born in Novorossiysk on 25 June [O.S. 12 June] 1904 into a Pontic Greek family. His younger brother, Konstantin Kokkinaki, was also a distinguished test pilot. In 1921 he finished elementary school, and worked on grape plantations and in the Novorossiysk port.

== Career ==
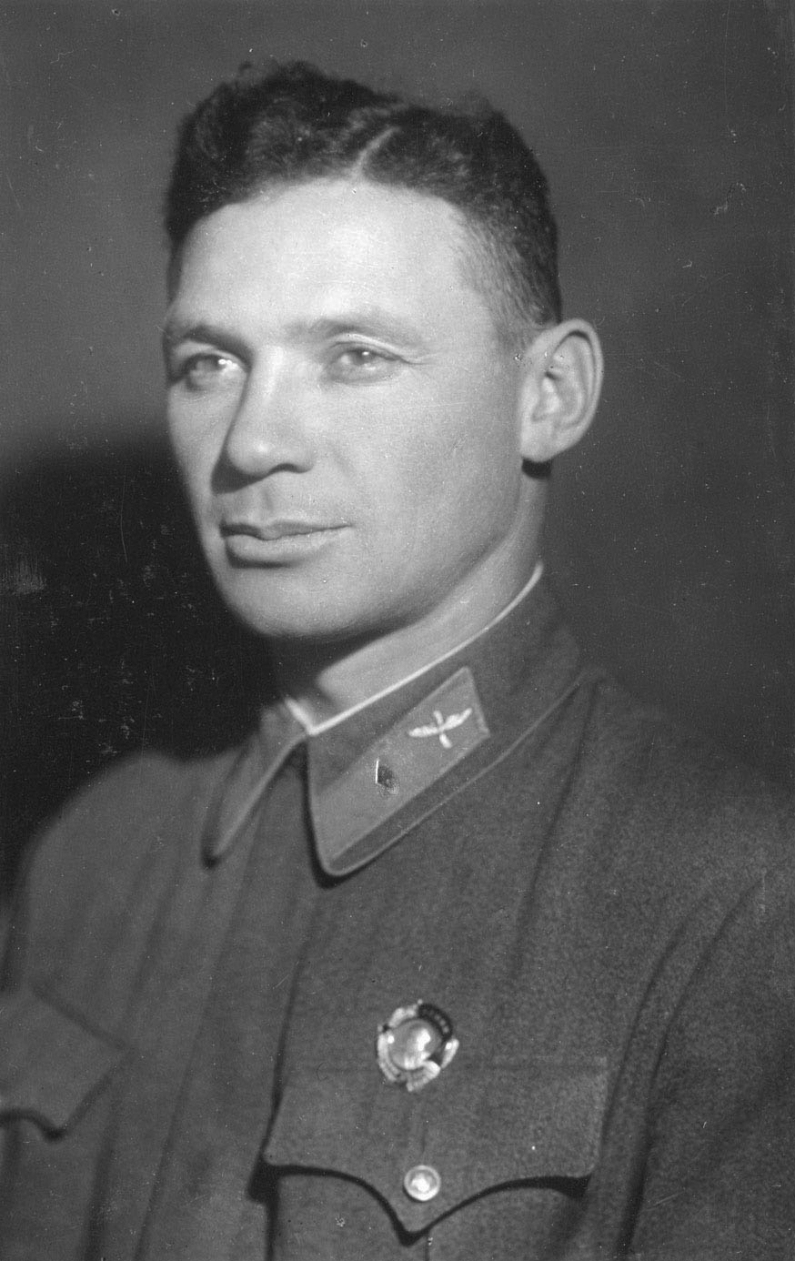
Kokkinaki, July 1938

He entered the Red Army in 1925, and served in the infantry until July 1927. He then entered the Leningrad Military-Theoretical School of the Red Air Force, from where he graduated in 1928. He subsequently entered the Borisoglebsk pilot school, from where he graduated in 1930. In April 1931, after a period of service in the 11th Fighter Squadron in the Moscow military district, he was transferred back to the Leningrad Military-Theoretical School as an instructor because of his pilot skills.

In the period 1932–1935 he served as test pilot for the Air Force, testing a series of aircraft. The first aircraft he tested was the attack aircraft Kocherigin-Gurevich TSh-3. Subsequently, he entered the Ilyushin Design Bureau (OKB) as its chief test pilot, where he remained until 1964. Throughout that period, he was the first to test fly all the aircraft of the OKB, including the prototypes of the Ilyushin Il-4 medium bomber, the Ilyushin Il-2 Shturmovik attack aircraft, the Ilyushin Il-28 jet bomber, and the Ilyushin Il-14 transport aircraft. He became a member of the Communist Party of the Soviet Union in 1938. Promoted to Major General of Aviation in 1943, during the Second World War Kokkinaki served as head of the Main Inspectorate of the People's Commissariat for the Aircraft Industry and as head of its flight-test service between the years 1943–1947. He retired from the Air Force in January 1966, but continued working for OKB Ilyushin in a supervisory capacity with overall responsibility for flight testing, with his last project being the Ilyushin Il-62.

He became the vice chairman of Fédération Aéronautique Internationale (FAI) in 1961 and assumed the position of chairman in 1966, a position he held until 1967, after which he was appointed to the honorary chairmanship. In the 1960s, he also served as chairman of the USSR Aviation Sport Federation. Kokkinaki lived in Moscow, where he died on 7 January 1985. He is buried in the Novodevichy cemetery in Moscow, along with his wife, Valentina.

== Records ==
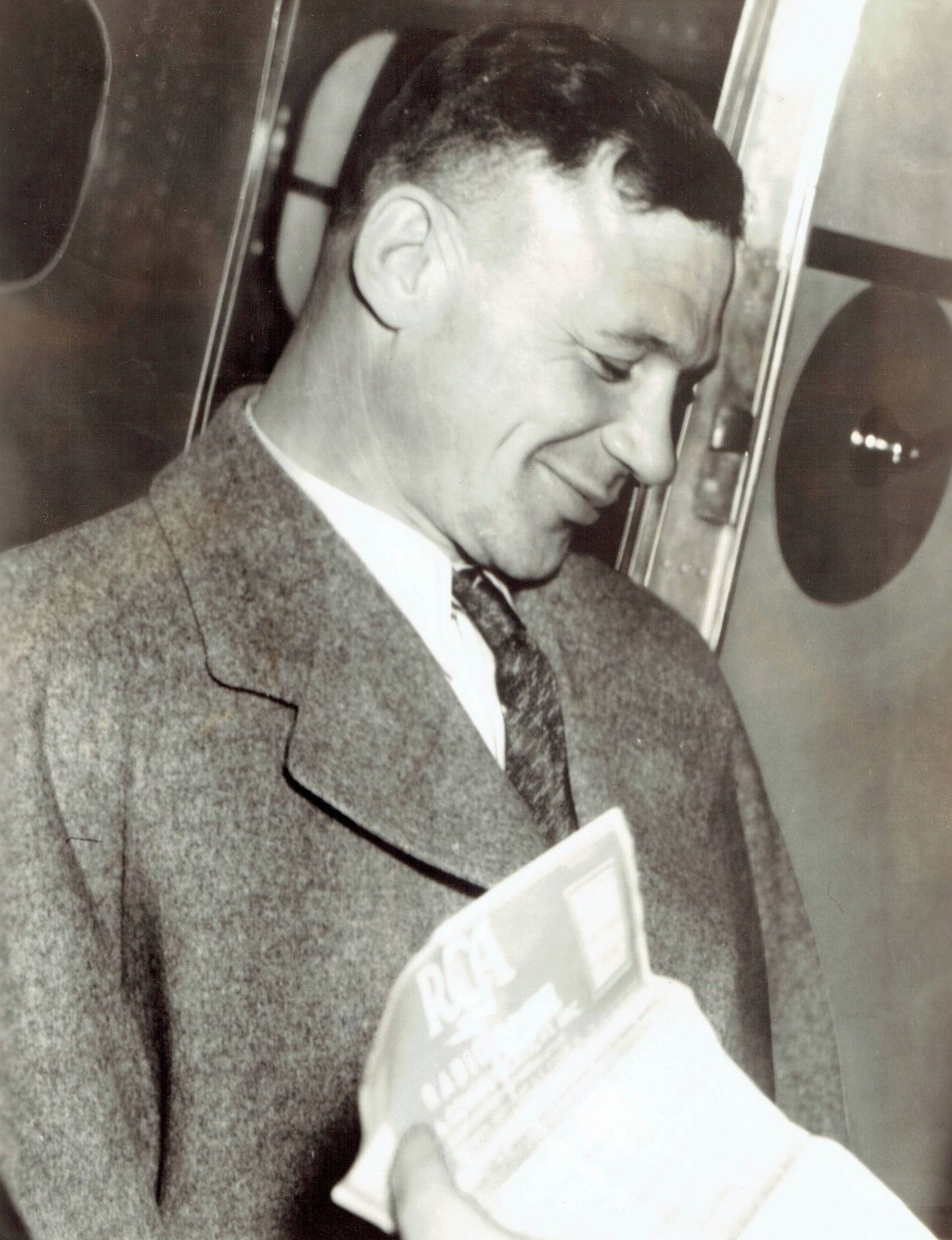
Kokkinaki in New York on 1 May 1939

On 21 November 1935, Kokkinaki set an unofficial world record for ceiling in a Polikarpov I-15 fighter, reaching the altitude of 14,575 meters. On 20 April 1936, he performed the Nesterov Loop for the first time with a twin-engine aircraft, a TsKB-26 (the prototype of the Ilyushin Il-4), in the presence of Joseph Stalin. In 1936–1937, Kokkinaki set seven successive altitude with varying payload records with the TsKB-26. His first official record, on 17 July 1936, was also the first official Soviet aviation record.

On 28 June 1937 Kokkinaki flew the circular Moscow – Sevastopol – Sverdlovsk – Moscow route, a distance of 5018 km, with a DB-3, setting a record in both speed at 5000 km range (with a median speed of 325 km/h) and range on a circular route. This flight was followed three months later by the 4000 km Moscow – Baku – Moscow route. On 27–28 June 1938, on board a modified TsKB-30 named "Moskva", with A.M. Bryandinskiy as his navigator, Kokkinaki flew from Moscow to Spassk-Dalny in the Soviet Far East, covering a distance of 7,580 km in 24 h 36 min, mostly at an altitude of 7000 meters, with an average speed of 307 km/h. For this feat, he was awarded the title "Hero of the Soviet Union" on 17 July. On 28 April 1939, with Mikhail Kh. Gordienko as co-pilot, he tried to surpass this feat by performing a non-stop east–west transatlantic flight from Moscow to New York City, to coincide with the opening of the "Land of Tomorrow" World Fair. However, due to encountering bad weather, the airplane was forced to come down on Miscou Island in New Brunswick, Canada. Coming not long after the death of Valery Chkalov, and with the approaching war, this well-publicized debacle spelled the end of the Soviet Arctic aviation exploits of the 1930s. Despite failing to reach his original destination, he still covered a distance of 8,000 km in 22 h 56 min, at an average speed of 348 km/h, and since 1959, the route he used (Moscow – Novgorod – Helsinki – Trondheim – Iceland – Cape Farewell – Miscou Island) is used for the regular flights between New York and Moscow. In 1965, he was honored by the International Air Transport Association with the diamond "wind rose" necklace for his finding the "shortest flight route between Europe and America".

From 1958 to 1960, he set another series of thirteen altitude with load and speed records flying the Ilyushin Il-18. His last world record was in 1960, when he flew an Il-18 at a distance of 5,018 kilometers with a payload of 10,000 kg and a median speed of 693 km/h.

== Awards and honours ==
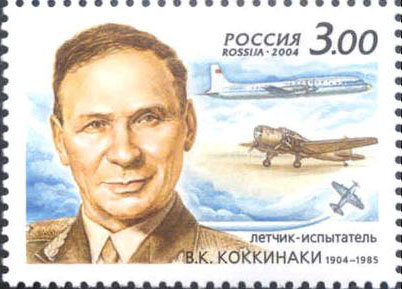
2004 Russian stamp honouring Kokkinanki

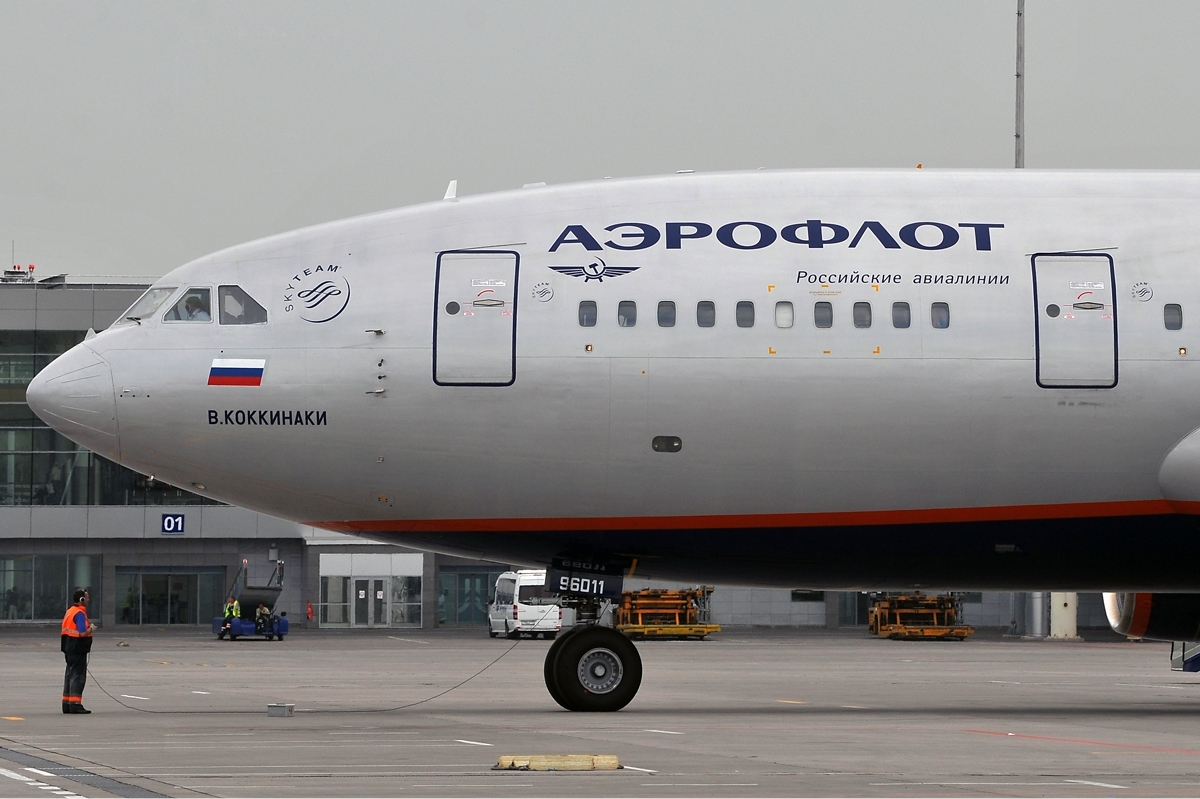
Aeroflot Ilyushin Il-96 RA-96011 named after Kokkinaki

Kokkinaki was awarded:

- The title "Hero of the Soviet Union" (in 1938 and 1957) Gold Stars Nos. 77 and 179);
- The title "Honoured Test Pilot of the USSR";
- Six Orders of Lenin (in 1936, 1938, 1939, 1945, 1951 and 1984);
- The Order of the October Revolution (in 1974);
- Three Orders of the Red Banner (1944, 1945 and 1957);
- Two Orders of the Patriotic War 1st class (in 1944 and 1947);
- Four Orders of the Red Star (1939, 1941, 1944 and 1969);
- The Medal "For Courage" in 1939;
- Multiple foreign medals, including the FAI Gold Air Medal in 1964. He was also awarded the titles "Distinguished Test Pilot of the Soviet Union" and "Distinguished Master of Sports of the Soviet Union" in 1959 and the Lenin Prize in 1960.

A street in Moscow has been named after him (fittingly, next to the Academician Ilyushin Street), and a bronze bust was erected in his home city of Novorossiysk on the occasion of the second award of the HSU title and Gold Star. A tanker, built in Kherson in 1985, is also named in his honor.

A heavy-lift airplane Volga-Dnepr Ilyushin Il-76TD-90VD (RA-76950, cn 2043420697) was named in his honour. An Aeroflot Russian Airlines Ilyushin Il-96 (RA-96011, cn 74393201008) has also been named in his honour.
