= No. 41 Squadron (Finland) =

No. 41 Squadron Finnish Air Force
- Country: Finland
- Branch: Finnish Air Force
- Role: bomber, later fighter
- Engagements: none

No. 41 Squadron (Finnish: Pommituslentolaivue 41 or PLe.Lv.41) was a bomber unit of the Finnish Air Force formed in 1946 and based at Luonetjärvi. The squadron belonged to Flying Regiment 4. In 1951 the unit was renamed into No. 41 Squadron (Lentolaivue 41 or Le.Lv.41).

== No. 41 Fighter Squadron ==
No. 41 Fighter Squadron (Hävittäjälentolaivue 41 or HävLLv 41) is currently the fighter training squadron of the Training Air Wing, based in Tikkakoski. It flies Hawk Mk.51s and Mk.51As. In 2009 it received the Mk.66s that were purchased from Switzerland in 2007.

=== Organization ===
- 1st Flight (1. Lentue)
- 2nd Flight (2. Lentue)
- 3rd Flight (3. Lentue)
