= Tumansky M-87 =

1930s Soviet aircraft piston engine

M-87
- Type: Radial aero engine
- National origin: Soviet Union
- Manufacturer: Tumansky
- First run: 1938
- Developed into: Tumansky M-88

The Tumansky M-87 was a Soviet air-cooled aircraft radial engine that was developed in the late 1930s. It was a development of their licensed Gnome-Rhone 14K engines that started with the M-85.

== Development ==
In 1934, USSR licensed the French Gnome-Rhone 14K aircraft engine producing 800 hp (595 kW), which entered production as the M-85. The engine was subsequently modified to M-86 which produced 960 hp (715 kW) at takeoff thanks to increased supercharging and a higher compression ratio. The M-87 was created to further increase the power output. Cylinders and pistons were revised to increase the compression ratio and the supercharger was redesigned. The resulting engine had better high-altitude performance and entered production in 1938. However, the engine proved unreliable and suffered from failure of gears in the reduction gearbox. Later the M-88 was designed to address the shortcomings of the M-87. At first the M-88 was not a success, but the designers persisted, and the M-88 was made into a reliable and widely produced engine. The M-87 was used in Ilyushin Il-4 and Sukhoi Su-2 bombers, and the Polikarpov I-180 fighter.

== Specifications (M-87) ==
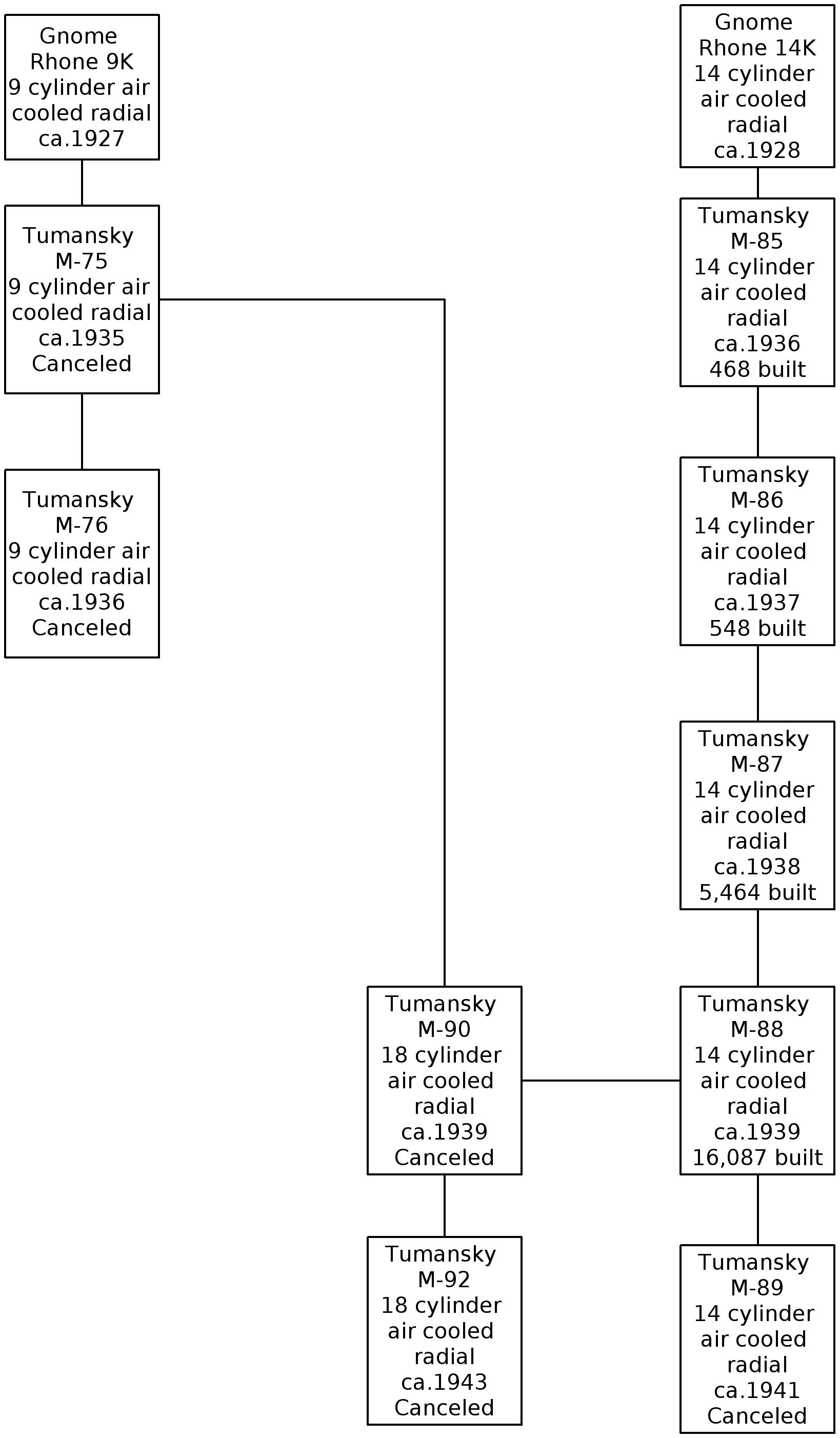
Family tree of Tumansky engines

=== General characteristics ===
- Type: Two-row, 14-cylinder, air-cooled supercharged radial engine
- Bore: 146 mm (5.748 in)
- Stroke: 165 mm (6.496 in)
- Displacement: 38.673 L (2,360 in³)
- Dry weight: 640 kg (1,140 lb)

=== Components ===
- Supercharger: Centrifugal type supercharger
- Cooling system: air

=== Performance ===
- Power output: 950 hp (710 kW) at 2,250 rpm for takeoff and at 4,500 m (14,765 ft)
- Specific power: 18.4 kW/L (0.4 hp/in³)
- Compression ratio: 6.1:1
- Power-to-weight ratio: 1.1 kW/kg (0.8 hp/lb)

== See also ==
Related development

- Gnome-Rhone 14K
- Tumansky M-88

Related lists

- List of aircraft engines
