= No. 48 Squadron (Finland) =

No. 48 Squadron Finnish Air Force
- Country: Finland
- Branch: Finnish Air Force
- Role: bomber
- Engagements: Continuation War

No. 48 Squadron (Finnish: Lentolaivue 48 or Le.Lv.48), renamed No. 48 Bomber Squadron (Finnish: Pommituslentolaivue 48 or PLe.Lv.48 on 14 February 1944) was a bomber squadron of the Finnish Air Force during World War II. The squadron was part of Flying Regiment 4.

== Organization ==
=== Continuation War ===
- 1st Flight (1. Lentue)
- 2nd Flight (2. Lentue)
- 3rd Flight (3. Lentue)
- Ambulance Flight (Sairaankuljetuslentue)
- Photography Flight or Flight Ahtiainen (Valokuvauslentue or Lentue Ahtiainen)
- Separate Photography Flight (Erillinen valokuvauslentue or Er.Valok.Ltue.)

The equipment consisted of 19 Bristol Blenheim Mk.Is, Bristol Blenheim Mk.IVs, 4 Ilyushin DB-3Ms, Ilyushin Il-4s, 4 Petlyakov Pe-2s, 1 Dornier Do 17Z, 1 Douglas DC-2, and 3 Junkers aircraft.
