= Tumansky M-88 =

Soviet piston aircraft engine

M-88
- Type: Radial aero engine
- National origin: Soviet Union
- Manufacturer: Tumansky
- First run: 1939
- Developed from: Tumansky M-87

The Tumansky M-88 was an air-cooled radial engine for aircraft developed in the Soviet Union shortly before World War II.

== Design and development ==
The M-88 was designed to address the shortcomings of the Tumansky M-87. The improvements incorporated in the M-88 were a strengthened crankcase, crankshaft, connecting rods, waffle ribbing at the piston bottom and a two speed geared centrifugal supercharger. The M-88 retained the same bore/stroke and displacement as the M-87 while increasing power to 1,000-1,150 hp. Design work began in 1937 and by 1939 the first prototypes were being flight tested in the Polikarpov I-180 fighter prototypes. At first the M-88 was not a success, but the designers persisted and the M-88 was made into a reliable and widely produced engine. There were a number of different variants with the most numerous being the M-88B, of which 10,585 were produced at Zaporozhye and Omsk. The M-88B solved most of the mechanical failures associated with the M-87 and early M-88's by including oil injectors in the crankshaft, improved cooling and strengthened drive components. 16,087 M-88's were produced. In hindsight, the Tumansky family of engines developed from the Gnome-Rhône 9K and Gnome-Rhône 14K were far less successful than the Shvetsov family of engines developed from the Wright R-1820.

== Applications ==
- Ilyushin Il-4
- Kharkiv KhAI-5
- Polikarpov I-180
- Sukhoi Su-2

== Specifications (Tumansky M-88B) ==
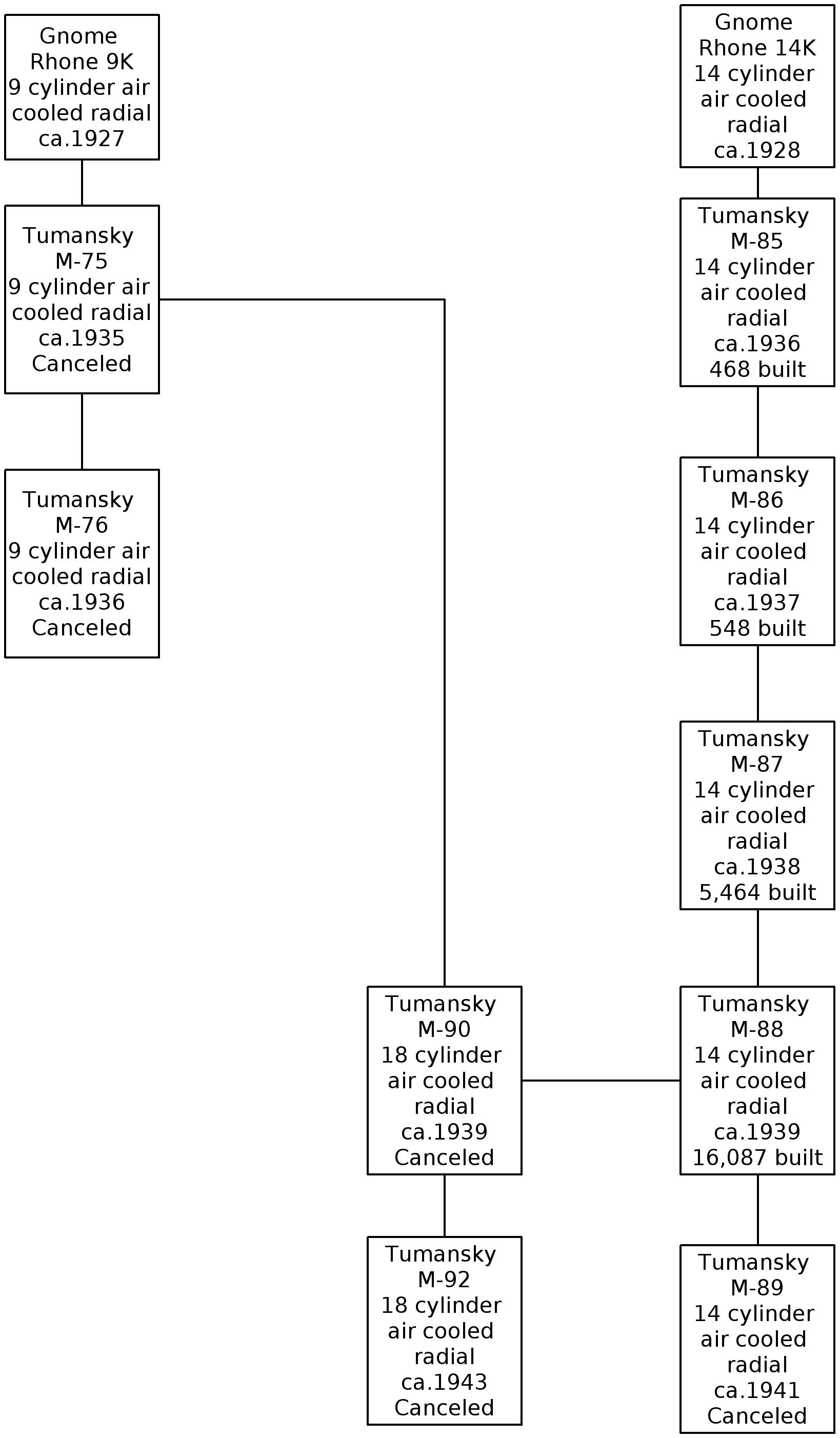
Family tree of Tumansky engines

=== General characteristics ===
- Type: 14-cylinder twin-row air-cooled radial engine
- Bore: 146 mm (5.75 in)
- Stroke: 165 mm (6.50 in)
- Displacement: 38.72 L (2,363 cu in)
- Dry weight: 684 kg (1,508 lb)

=== Components ===
- Supercharger: Two-speed, geared centrifugal
- Cooling system: air-cooled

=== Performance ===
- Power output: 1,100hp
- Compression ratio: 6.1:1

== See also ==
Related development

- Tumansky M-87
- Gnome-Rhône Mistral Major

Comparable engines

- BMW 801
- Bristol Hercules
- Bristol Taurus
- Gnome-Rhône 14N
- Mitsubishi Kinsei
- Nakajima Sakae
- Piaggio P.XIX
- Shvetsov ASh-82

Related lists

- List of aircraft engines
