= No. 42 Squadron (Finland) =

No. 42 Squadron Finnish Air Force
- Active: 1940–1952
- Country: Finland
- Branch: Finnish Air Force
- Role: Bomber
- Engagements: Winter War, Continuation War, Lapland War

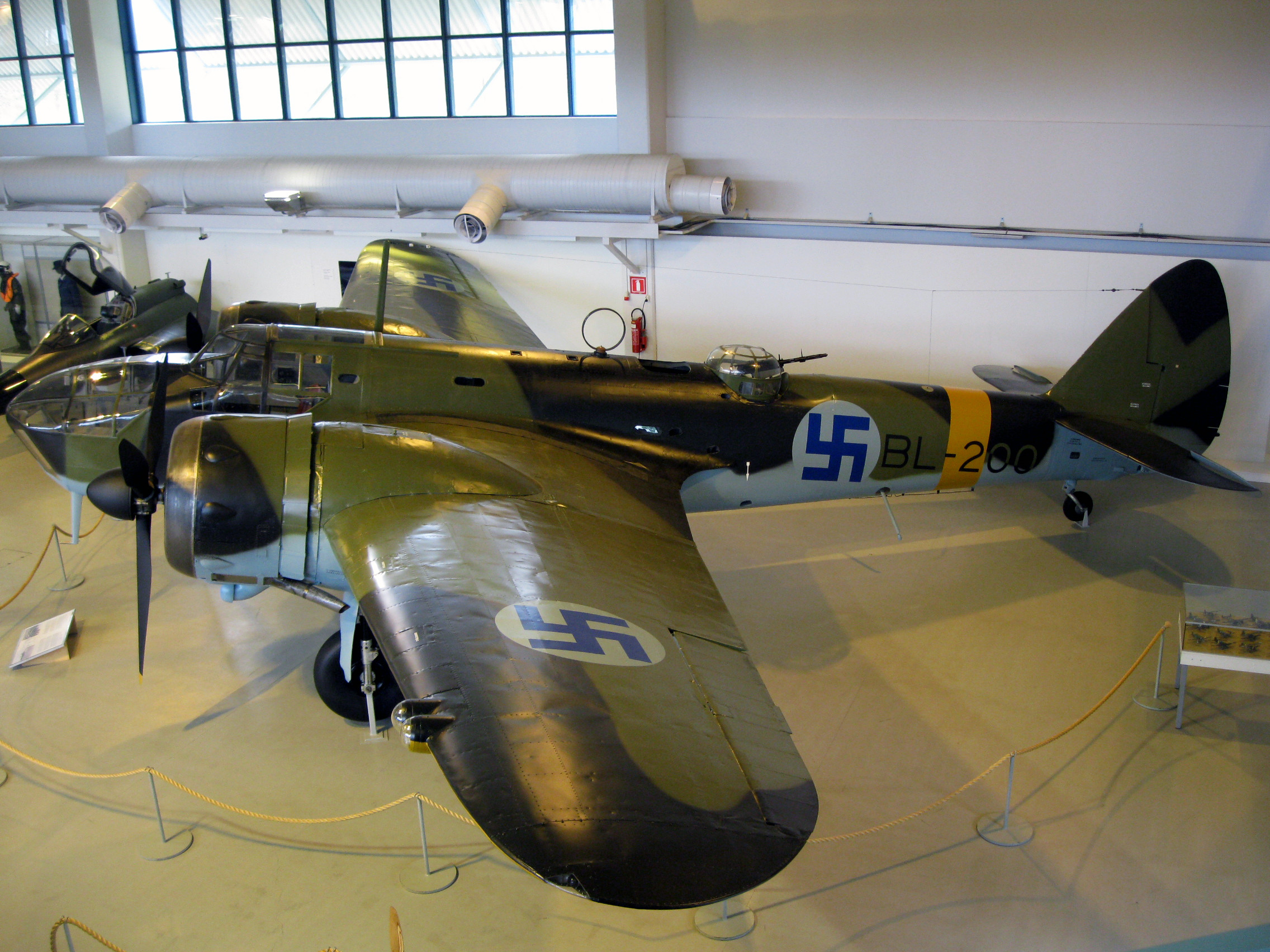
A Bristol Blenheim bomber aircraft, which the No. 42 Squadron operated.

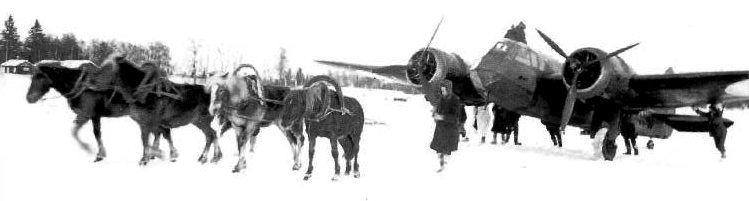
A Blenheim bomber aircraft, with OH-IPD (BL-137) markings, being towed by horses on the ice of Jukasjärvi on 26 February 1940.

No. 42 Squadron (Finnish: Lentolaivue 42 or LLv.42, from 3 May 1942 Le.Lv.42), renamed No. 42 Bomber Squadron (Finnish: Pommituslentolaivue 42 or PLe.Lv.42 on 14 February 1944) was a long-range bomber squadron of the Finnish Air Force during World War II. It was established in 1940. The squadron participated in the Winter, Continuation and Lapland wars as part of Flying Regiment 4, and was the only regiment in the squadron that exclusively operated Bristol Blenheim bomber aircraft. The squadron was abolished in 1952.

The Third Regiment, of the Flying Regiment 4, was established on 16 January 1940, but existed initially only on paper. Under the command of Captain Armas Eskola, the crews of its three flights were transferred to Juva on 23 February to wait for their British-purchased Blenheim fleet. The 12 aircraft, flown by English pilots, arrived at Juva Jukajärvi Airport on 26 February. The machines were long-nosed, Mk.IVs. After a short period of training, the squadron took part in bombing missions from 4 March 1940, fighting the Russian invasion of the Vyborg Bay . By the start of the truce, the squadron had completed 62 aircraft-specific warfare flights. One aircraft had been lost, three of the crew had died and one had been taken as a prisoner of war.

After the Winter War, the squadron moved from Jukajärvi to the Luonetjärvi base, where training continued throughout the truce. On 25 April 1940, seven aircraft and their crew transferred to Pori Airport for a month-long mission to fly surveillance flights in the Baltic Sea and the Åland Islands. The squadron aircraft also performed aerial photography during the truce: on 13 October and 11 November 1940, the Soviet base at Hanko and the Russian airports in the Karelian Isthmus were photographed.

In the summer of 1941, at the beginning of the Continuation War, the squadron was transferred to Siikakangas Airport . The squadron flew its first military flight on 28 June, performing reconnaissance and filming the sections Parikkala-Rautu and Vyborg-Sortavala with a single aircraft. These remained the only flights from the Siikakangas field. On 3 July, the squadron was transferred back to Lake Luonetjärvi, with the task of supporting the field army, which was preparing to attack at the Karelian Isthmus. On 4 July, the squadron bombarded Russian troops and tanks on the Tyry-Ihala road with nine aircraft, and railway equipment at Elisenvaara station on 8 July, first with eight aircraft and later the same day with nine aircraft.

The third flight was discontinued on 18 November due to a shortage of aircraft. At the end of the year, the squadron had only four working Blenheim aircraft in good condition. Major Olavi Lumiala was appointed squadron commander on 4 August 1942.

The first bombing mission of 1943 was completed on 19 February, when the squadron took part in the whole regiment's bombing of the weapons factories at Seke. The four aircraft from LeLv 42 all hit the target. The day after the Seke attack, the third flight of the squadron was re-established as the fleet improved. In addition to recriving repaired aircraft from the aircraft factory, the squadron received four Blenheim's from LeLv 44, who were transferring to Junkers Ju 88s.

On 14 February 1944, the name of the squadron was changed, by adding a prefix, describing its operations, and was henceforth known as Bomber Squadron 42 (PLeLv 42). On the same day, Major Kalle Kepsu became the new commander of the squadron.

The squadron participated in the Lapland war, as part of Flying Regiment 4, which was subordinate to the Sarko Flight Group. It conducted bombardment and reconnaissance missions against the retreating German troops, flying out from the Paltamo, Pudasjärvi and Kemi airports. On 4 December, as the Air Force bengan transferring to its peace-time organization, the squadron was renamed the Bomber Squadron 41. The squadron flew only a few flights, and on 20 January it received orders to move to its peacetime base at Luonetjärvi, which was accomplished by 26 January. Two Blenheims were lost in the Lapland War, both shot down by German air defense.

Following the lifting of the flight ban imposed by the Allied Control Commission in the fall of 1944, the squadron continued to operate from the Luonetjärvi base, training Blenheim crews up until 1 August 1945. The bombers were scrapped in accordance with the Paris Peace Agreement, which entered into force on 15 September 1947, and after a transitional period of one year, Messerschmitt Bf 109 aircraft were assigned to the squadron on 15 September 1948. The first 109s entered the squadron in October 1948. As the Messerschmitt fleet were at the end of their lives, the squadron was decommissioned on 1 December 1952, as part of the Air Force reorganization. A commemorative plaque attached to a boulder in front of Juva's municipal hall, was unveiled on 5 July 1992.

== Organization ==
=== Winter War ===
- 1st Flight (1. Lentue)
- 2nd Flight (2. Lentue)
- 3rd Flight (3. Lentue)

The Squadron was equipped with 12 Bristol Blenheim Is.

=== Continuation War ===
- 1st Flight (1. Lentue)
- 2nd Flight (2. Lentue)
- 3rd Flight (3. Lentue)
- ? Flight of No. 44 Squadron (?./Le.Lv.44)
- Photography Flight or Flight Ahtiainen (Valokuvauslentue or Lentue Ahtiainen)

The equipment consisted of 18 Bristol Blenheim Mk.Is, later equipped with Blenheim Mk.IVs.

== Bibliography ==
- Hämäläinen, Matti (2000). Finnish Air Force: Bomber Squadron 42 = Pommituslentolaivue 42. Finnish Air Force Squadrons. Vol. 1. Helsinki: Koala-Kustannus. ISBN 952-5186-13-X.
