= Stepan Suprun =

Soviet aviator (1907–1941)

Stepan Pavlovich Suprun
- Степан Павлович Супрун
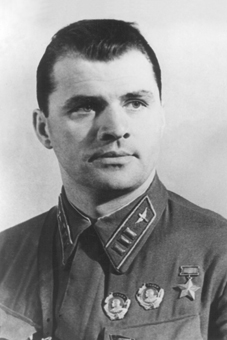
- Born: 2 August 1907; Richky, Russian Empire (now Ukraine)
- Died: 4 July 1941 (aged 33); Talachyn District, Byelorussian SSR, Soviet Union (now Belarus)
- Military career
- Allegiance: Soviet Union
- Branch: Soviet Air Force
- Service years: 1929 – 1941
- Rank: Lieutenant colonel
- Unit: 401st Special Purpose Fighter Aviation Regiment
- Conflicts: Second Sino-Japanese War; World War II
- Awards: Hero of the Soviet Union (twice)

Stepan Pavlovich Suprun (Russian: Степа́н Па́влович Супру́н; 2 August [O.S. 20 July] 1907 – 4 July 1941) was a Soviet test pilot who tested over 140 aircraft types during his career. He was also a fighter pilot and twice awarded the title Hero of the Soviet Union.

== Early life ==
Suprun was born on 2 August [O.S. 20 July] 1907 to a Ukrainian family in the Kharkov Governorate of the Russian Empire. In 1910 he and his family moved to the United States, and in 1913 they moved to Canada where he graduated from eight grades of school in Winnipeg and joined the Young Communist League of Canada before moving to the newly-formed Soviet Union in 1924. Originally he lived in Altai Krai before moving to Alma-Ata.

He began working in Ukraine as an apprentice in a workshop in 1925, and from 1926 to 1928 he worked as a carpenter in the city Sumy. In 1928 he began working at a factory as a milling machine operator.

== Aviation and military career ==
Having entered the military in October 1929, he graduated from initial aviation training in March 1930 in Smolensk, where he underwent further training as part of the 83rd Training Squadron, and received instruction in flight from Sergey Denisov. Having completed the program in July 1931, Suprun was assigned to the 91st Fighter Aviation Squadron as a flight commander.

In July 1933 he became a test pilot at the Red Army Air Force Scientific Research Institute, where he conducted tests of I-1B, I-21, and I-180 aircraft. One year after starting his work as a test pilot he began flying at the parades over Red Square. He met Aleksandr Pokryshkin (who later became a flying ace and thrice Hero of the Soviet Union) during a vacation on the coast of the Black Sea in 1935. In 1937 he became a deputy of the Supreme Soviet of Sevastopol, and from 1937 to 1938 he visited the United States as part of a Soviet delegation. Valery Chkalov praised him for his bravery during the delegation's trip. After returning to the Soviet Union he had the opportunity to conduct test flights on a captured the Bf-109, during which he discovered why pilots of the German plane would not dogfight certain Soviet fighter aircraft capable of making sharp turns. After the death of Valery Chkalov, Suprun was granted permission to start flying the I-180. During one landing after a test flight the right landing gear broke, but he survived the crash with only light injuries.

== Second Sino-Japanese war ==
From July 1939 to January 1940 he was posted as the commander of a Fighter Aviation Group posted in China to provide defense against Japanese attacks on densely populated areas. His unit of roughly 50 aircraft was assigned to the city of Chongqing until they were transferred to Yunnan in December where they were tasked with protecting strategically important airfields and equipment. During the conflict Suprun made 83 sorties, flying the I-15 and I-16, of which seven were at night.

== Return from deployment ==
Upon returning to the USSR in January 1940, he was asked by Moscow to be part of an aircraft-buying delegation to Germany in March. During the visit he conducted preliminary flights on German aircraft the Soviet Union was going to buy. With the help of Suprun, the Soviet Union was able to purchase a variety of aircraft, including the Bf 109, Bf 110, Do 215, Fw 58, He 100, and Ju 88.

On 20 May 1940 he was awarded the title Hero of the Soviet Union for his role in testing new aircraft and his actions in China. He continued working as a testing aircraft, and throughout his career as a test pilot he conducted test flights on over 140 aircraft types.

== World War II and death ==
Two days after the start of Operation Barbarossa, Suprun requested permission from the institute to create and command a regiment composed of test pilots. After his proposal was approved by Stalin, six regiments were formed out of the pilots from the institute; two were equipped with the Il-2 for ground attack purposes, two were assigned Pe-2 dive bomber, and one received the Pe-8 to become a long-range bomber unit. The unit Suprun was given command of was issued 32 MiG-3 fighters and designated as the 401st Special Purpose Fighter Aviation Regiment. Despite being a regimental commander, he flew combat sorties, and he scored his first aerial victory on 27 June 1941, a Hs 126. He was killed in action on 4 July 1941 after engaging a Luftwaffe plane; it is unclear if he scored an aerial victory during his last dogfight and some sources indicate he shot down a Bf 109 right before his death. Sources also differ as to if he was shot down by enemy aircraft or ground forces. After his death he was awarded the gold star a second time, making him the first person to become a twice Hero of the Soviet Union during the war. His remains were originally buried in Talachyn district near his place of death, but in 1960 his remains were transferred to the Novodevichy cemetery.

His brother Aleksandr was also a pilot who fought in the war. During a mission in October 1941 he managed to land his fighter with 118 bullet holes in it despite bad injuries.

== Awards and honors ==
- Twice Hero of the Soviet Union (20 May 1940 and 22 July 1941)
- Two Order of Lenin (25 May 1936 and 20 May 1940)
- Order of the Cloud and Banner of China (1939)
