= No. 44 Squadron (Finland) =

No. 44 Squadron Finnish Air Force
- Country: Finland
- Branch: Finnish Air Force
- Role: bomber
- Engagements: Winter War, Continuation War

No. 44 Squadron (Finnish: Lentolaivue 44 or LLv.44, from 3 May 1942 Le.Lv.44), renamed No. 44 Bomber Squadron (Finnish: Pommituslentolaivue 44 or PLe.Lv.44 on 14 February 1944), was a bomber squadron of the Finnish Air Force during World War II. The squadron was part of Flying Regiment 4.

== Organization ==
=== Winter War ===
- 1st Flight (1. Lentue)
- 2nd Flight (2. Lentue)
- 3rd Flight (3. Lentue)

The Squadron was equipped with 8 Bristol Blenheim Is and 1 Douglas DC-2.

=== Continuation War ===
- 1st Flight (1. Lentue)
- 2nd Flight (2. Lentue)
- 3rd Flight (3. Lentue)
- 4th Flight (4. Lentue)
- Detachment Räty (Osasto Räty)
- Detachment Malinen (Osasto Malinen)

The equipment consisted of 8 Bristol Blenheim Mk.Is and some Mk.IVs, 3 Junkers K 43, 1 Blackburn Ripon IIF, 1 Heinkel He 115, and 14 Junkers Ju 88s.

== Bibliography ==
- Keskinen, Kalevi & Stenman, Kari (1999). Finnish Dornier Do 17 Z, Junkers Ju 88 A-4. Suomen ilmavoimien historia (in Finnish). Vol. 2. Helsinki: Hobby-kustannus. ISBN 952-5334-01-5.
- Shores, Christopher F. (1969). Finnish Air Force 1918–1968. Aircam Aviation Series. Vol. S2. Canterbury, UK: Osprey Publications. ISBN 0-85045-012-8.
