= Ilyushin Il-6 =

Soviet long range bomber by Ilyushin

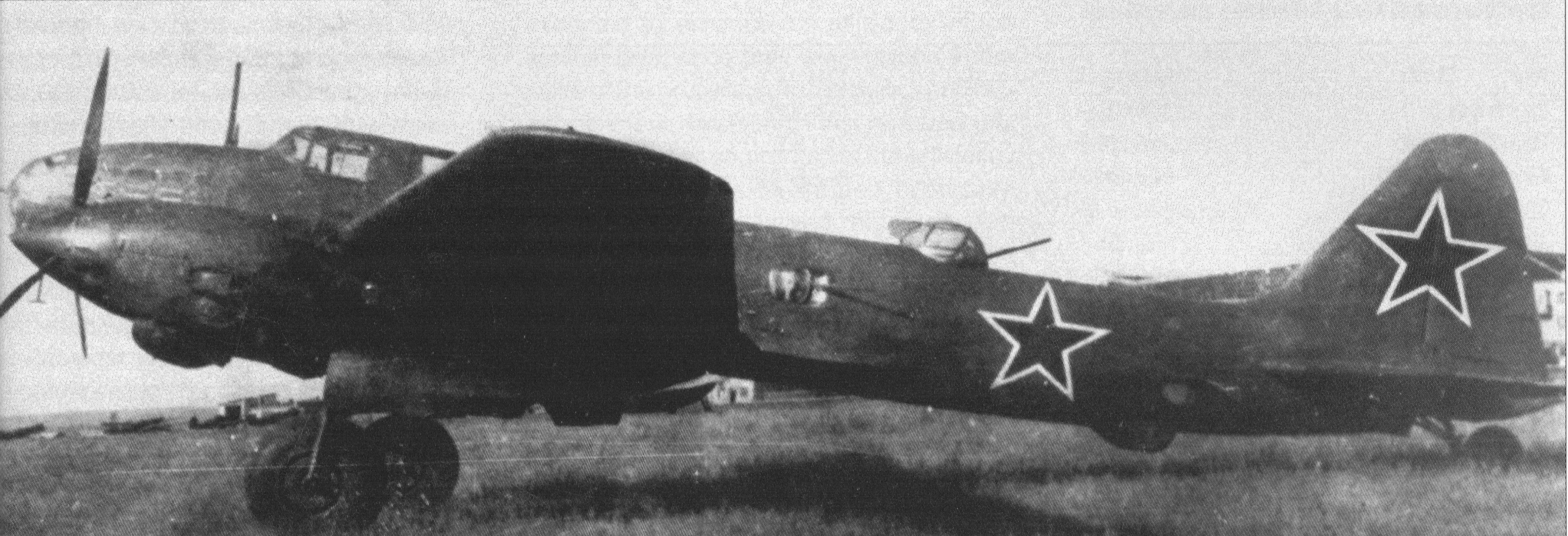
- Il-6 with Charomsky ACh-30 B diesel engines.

General information
- Type: Long-range bomber
- National origin: Soviet Union
- Manufacturer: Ilyushin
- Number built: 4

History
- First flight: 7 August 1943
- Developed from: Ilyushin Il-4

The Ilyushin Il-6 (Russian: Ильюшин Ил-6) was a Soviet long-range bomber developed from the Ilyushin Il-4 during 1942. Originally intended as a high-speed replacement for the Il-4, it was recast as a very long-range bomber with fuel-conserving diesel engines before production of the single prototype began in December 1942. Flight testing showed controllability issues when landing at high weights and the engines proved to be hard to start at low temperatures and were slow to respond to throttle movements. Further development was canceled in 1944.

== Development ==
Outwardly similar to the Il-4, the Il-6 was faster and had a longer and slimmer fuselage fitted with a completely new, highly tapered wing with an aspect ratio of 8. The engine nacelles were streamlined to reduce drag and increase speed as the engine radiators were mounted in the wing center section, fed by slits in the leading edge of the wing. Defensive armament was greatly improved with five 20 mm (0.79 in) cannon fitted on flexible mountings in the nose, dorsal turret, two waist positions and a ventral blister forward of the tailplane.

The Il-6 was originally intended as a high-speed replacement for the Il-4. But after the initial design was completed in August 1942, the VVS requested that the bomber have extended range instead of high speed. The original M-71 radial engines were therefore replaced by Charomskiy ACh-30 diesel engines with low fuel consumption which promised to give the Il-6 the required range, especially when operated at moderate weights. The revised design was completed in December 1942 and production of the prototype was initiated. The first flight of the Il-6 was made in Irkutsk on 7 August 1943 with lower-powered ACh-30B engines substituted for the unavailable ACh-30BF engines.

Flight tests revealed difficult handling, and a lack of power due to the non-availability of the intended ACh-30BF engines. Flight tests continued without the waist guns and their gunner until the ACh-30BF's were fitted between May and July 1944. Despite modifications, the aircraft still suffered from poor controllability at low speeds and high weights as well as very poor gliding performance. Throughout the flight tests the engines performed satisfactorily in the air, but were found to be very difficult to start in low ambient temperatures and had slow response to throttle movements. Further development was canceled.

== Variants ==
- Il-6 – intended production version with Charomskiy ACh-30BF engines (also known as M-30).
- Il-6 – bomber with M-90 engines - projected variant with M-90 engines, production drawings were issued but nothing further was heard of it, presumably as all effort was focused on the diesel-powered version.

== Specifications (Il-6 1944) ==
Data from OKB Ilyushin: A History of the Design Bureau and its Aircraft

General characteristics

- Crew: 5
- Length: 17.38 m (57 ft 0 in)
- Wingspan: 26.07 m (85 ft 6 in)
- Wing area: 84.8 m^{2} (913 sq ft)
- Aspect ratio: 8
- Empty weight: 11,930 kg (26,301 lb)
- Gross weight: 16,100 kg (35,494 lb)
- Max takeoff weight: 19,600 kg (43,211 lb)
- Powerplant: 2 × Charomskiy ACh-30BF (M-30) V-12 liquid-cooled diesel piston engines, 1,400 kW (1,900 hp) each
- Propellers: 3-bladed constant-speed propellers

Performance

- Maximum speed: 400 km/h (250 mph, 220 kn) at sea level

464 km/h (288 mph; 251 kn) at rated altitude (6,200 m (20,300 ft))

- Landing speed: 139 km/h (86 mph; 75 kn)
- Cruise speed: 340 km/h (210 mph, 180 kn)
- Range: 5,450 km (3,390 mi, 2,940 nmi) at 340 km/h (210 mph; 180 kn) (with 1,000 kg (2,205 lb) bomb load) at 18,150 kg (40,014 lb) AUW
- Service ceiling: 7,000 m (23,000 ft)
- Time to altitude: 5,000 m (16,000 ft) in 28 minutes 42 seconds
- Take-off run: 730 m (2,400 ft)

Armament

- Guns: 5× 20 mm (0.79 in) ShVAK Sh-20 cannon in a dorsal turret, and flexible mountings at the nose, beam and ventral positions.
- Bombs: normal 1,000 kg (2,205 lb) ; maximum 4,500 kg (9,921 lb)

- 2,500 kg (5,512 lb) of bombs, maximum, internally

plus

- 2 × 1,000 kg (2,205 lb) bombs on external racks

or

- 2 × 1,000 kg (2,205 lb) torpedoes on external racks

== See also ==
Aircraft of comparable role, configuration, and era

- Junkers Ju 86
- North American XB-28
- Vickers Warwick

Related lists

- List of military aircraft of the Soviet Union and the CIS
- List of bomber aircraft
