= Ilyushin Il-4 =

Long-range bomber in the Soviet Air Force

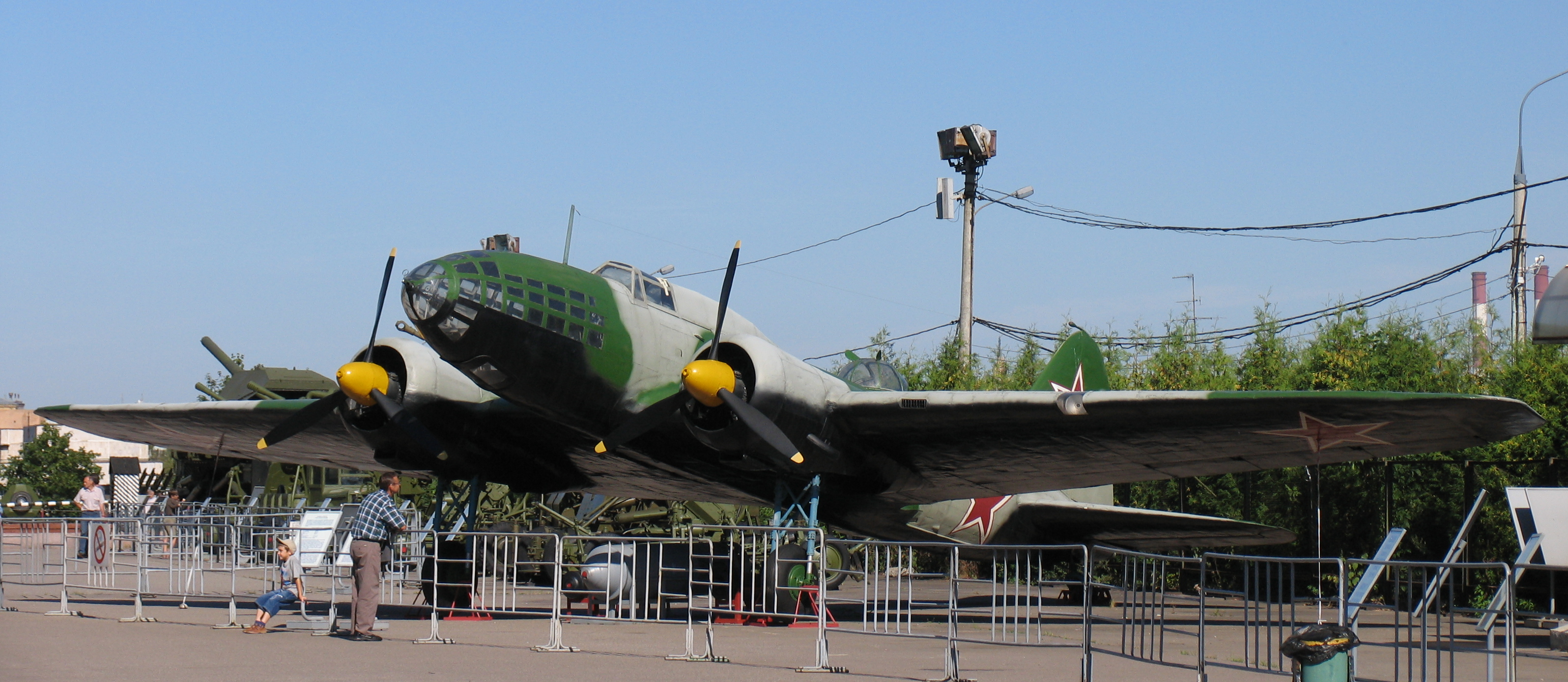
- Il-4 in the Museum of the Great Patriotic War, Moscow, Russia

General information
- Type: Long-range bomber
- Designer: Ilyushin
- Primary user: Soviet Air Force
- Number built: 5,256

History
- Manufactured: 1940-1945
- First flight: 31 March 1936
- Developed from: Ilyushin DB-3
- Developed into: Ilyushin Il-6

The Ilyushin Il-4 (DB-3F) (Russian: Ильюшин Ил-4 (ДБ-3Ф); NATO reporting name: Bob) is a Soviet twin-engined long-range bomber and torpedo bomber, widely used by the Soviet Air Force and Soviet Naval Aviation during World War II.

== Design and development ==
In 1938, the Ilyushin design bureau redesigned the Ilyushin DB-3 to ease production and improve its performance, the revised version receiving the designation DB-3F (Forsirovanniye or "boosted"). The aircraft's internal structure, particularly the wings, was extensively changed, eliminating the need for hand finishing of the structure, and with duralumin replacing the large scale use of steel in the earlier version. The aircraft's fuel system was redesigned, increasing its internal capacity while reducing the number of fuel tanks. The fuselage nose was lengthened to give more room for the navigator/bombardier while reducing drag. The prototype DB-3F, powered by the same 949 hp (708 kW) Tumansky M-87B engines of the DB-3M, was piloted on its maiden flight by Vladimir Kokkinaki on 21 May 1939. It successfully passed through state acceptance tests and entered production in January 1940, with the 1,100 hp (820 kW) Tumansky M-88 quickly replacing the M-87. The DB-3F was redesignated Il-4 in March 1942. Some series had wooden outer wings and front fuselages to conserve metals, and throughout the production, engines and fuel tanks were upgraded for improved performance while retaining the same range. However the most notable change was the addition of larger defensive guns in the turret, using the 12.7 mm (0.5 in) UBT machine gun in place of the earlier 7.62 mm (0.3 in) weapons. In addition, it was found that the gunners were attacked first, so blocks of armor were placed around the gunner positions.

This extra weight was not offset by the newer engines however, and the Il-4 proved to be slower than the earlier versions at only 404 km/h (251 mph). An attempt to improve performance was made as the Il-6, adding large diesel engines and heavier armament. The engines proved unreliable and production was never started. The Il-4 remained in production until 1945, when just over 5,200 had been built.

== Operational history ==
=== Soviet Union ===
Ilyushin Il-4s of the 5th Guards Mine-Torpedo Aviation Regiment of the Air Forces of the Black Sea Fleet leaving on a combat mission, June 1942

Although the Il-4 was only a medium bomber, it had the range to be used on strategic missions. The use of the bombers in this role was not a priority for the VVS, but nevertheless the Il-4 was used on several long-range bombing raids against Berlin in 1941. Most would be used on much shorter range missions, often adding another 1,000 kg (2,204 lb) of bombs under the wings, in addition to the internal 2,500 kg (5,512 lb).

=== Finland ===
Finland bought four captured DB-3Fs from German stocks. These were given the Finnish Air Force serials DF-22 to DF-25 and flown from Bryansk, Russia to Finland (one aircraft, DF-22, was destroyed en route and crashed near Syeschtschinskaya airfield). The aircraft were later flown by No. 48 Sqn during 1943 (DF-23, DF-24 and DF-25), No. 46 Sqn during 1944 (DF-23 and DF-24) and No. 45 Sqn for a short time in 1945 (DF-23), until the last remaining serviceable aircraft went into depot on 23 February 1945. After the war, DF-25 was lost in a snowstorm, landed on the ice and crashed into the woods in Öja near the city of Kokkola. Most parts of the plane were rescued and taken to a depot.

== Operators ==
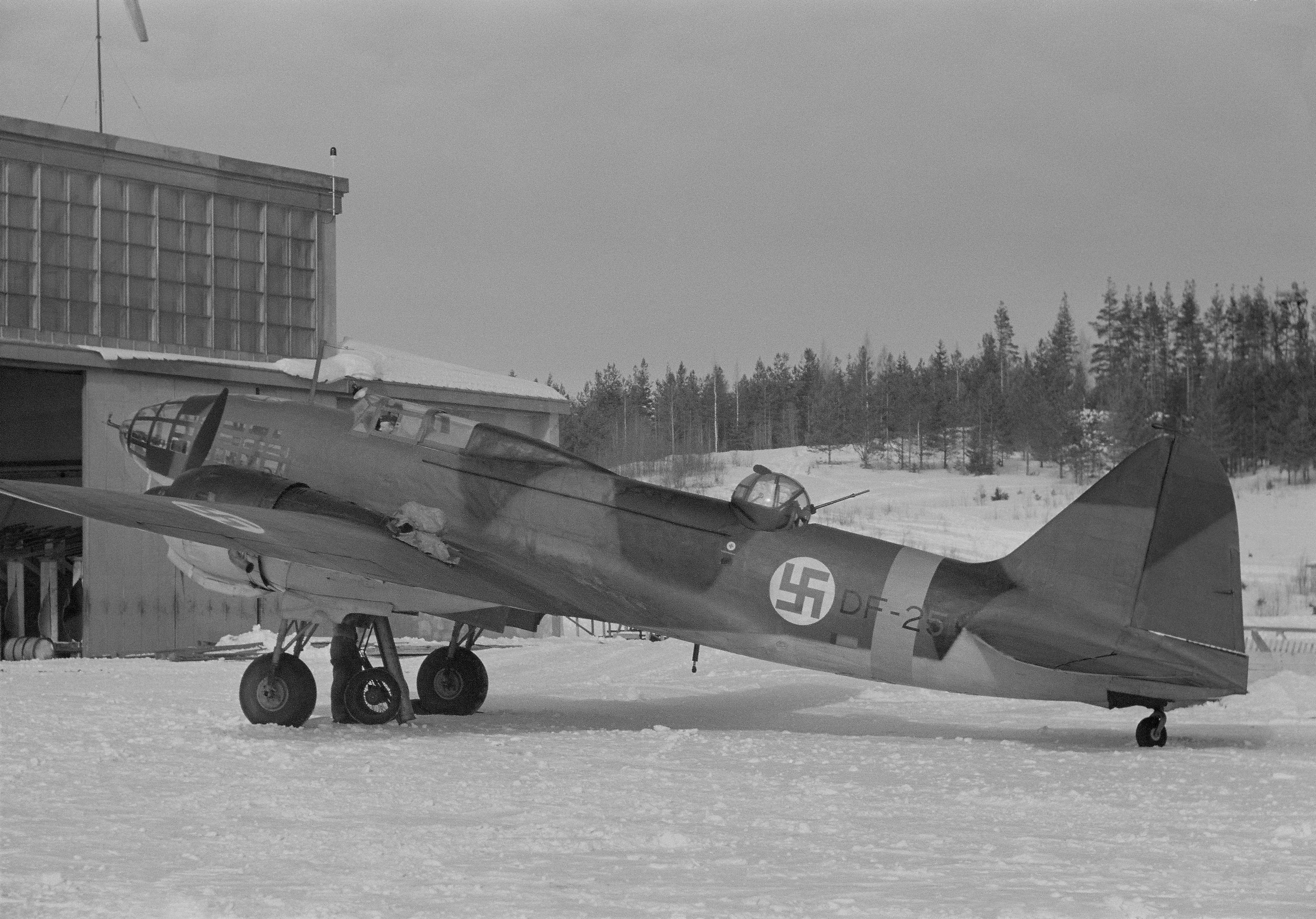
Ilyushin Il-4 in Finnish service; aircraft number DF-25. Photo taken in April 1944.

China

- Chinese Nationalist Air Force 24 aircraft

Finland

- Finnish Air Force 11 aircraft of the type DB-3M and four aircraft of the type DB-3F (Il-4)

Germany

- Luftwaffe (tests only)

Soviet Union

- Soviet Air Force

Regiments as at 1945-46:
10th Guards Bomber Aviation Regiment
290th Bomber Aviation Regiment
303rd Bomber Aviation Regiment (Zavitinsk, Amur Oblast)
442nd Bomber Aviation Regiment (Belogorsk, Amur Oblast) with Il-4
other regiments

- Soviet Naval Aviation

== Specifications (Il-4) ==
Il-4 (1942) 3-view drawing

Data from From DB-3 To Il-4...The Soviet Long-Range Bomber

General characteristics

- Crew: four (pilot, bombardier/navigator, dorsal gunner/wireless-operator, ventral gunner)
- Length: 14.76 m (48 ft 5 in)
- Wingspan: 21.44 m (70 ft 4 in)
- Wing area: 66.70 m^{2} (718.0 sq ft)
- Empty weight: 5,800 kg (12,787 lb)
- Max takeoff weight: 12,120 kg (26,720 lb)
- Powerplant: 2 × Tumansky M-88B 14-cyl. air-cooled radial piston engines, 820 kW (1,100 hp) each

Performance

- Maximum speed: 410 km/h (250 mph, 220 kn) at 6,500 m (21,325 ft)
- Range: 3,800 km (2,400 mi, 2,100 nmi) (max internal fuel), 2,600 km (1,404 nmi; 1,616 mi) with 1,000 kg (2,200 lb) bombs
- Service ceiling: 8,700 m (28,500 ft)
- Time to altitude: 13.6 min to 5,000 m (16,404 ft)

Armament

- Guns:
  - 2 × 7.62×54mmR ShKAS machine guns (1 in nose, 1 in ventral hatch)
  - 1 × 12.7×108mm UBT machine gun in dorsal turret
- Rockets: 2 × BETAB-750DS 305 mm rockets.
- Missiles: 1 × 940 kg (2,100 lb) Type 45-36 torpedo
- Bombs: Up to 2,700 kg (6,000 lb) of bombs or mines.

== See also ==
Related development

- Ilyushin DB-3
- Ilyushin Il-6

Aircraft of comparable role, configuration, and era

- Heinkel He 111
- IAR 79
- Martin B-26 Marauder
- Mitsubishi G4M
- Nakajima Ki-49 Donryu
- North American B-25 Mitchell
- PZL.37 Łoś
- Savoia-Marchetti SM.79
- Tupolev Tu-2
- Vickers Wellington

Related lists

- List of aircraft of World War II
- List of military aircraft of the Soviet Union and the CIS
- List of bomber aircraft
