= Charomskiy ACh-30 =

Soviet aircraft diesel engine developed during World War II

ACh-30
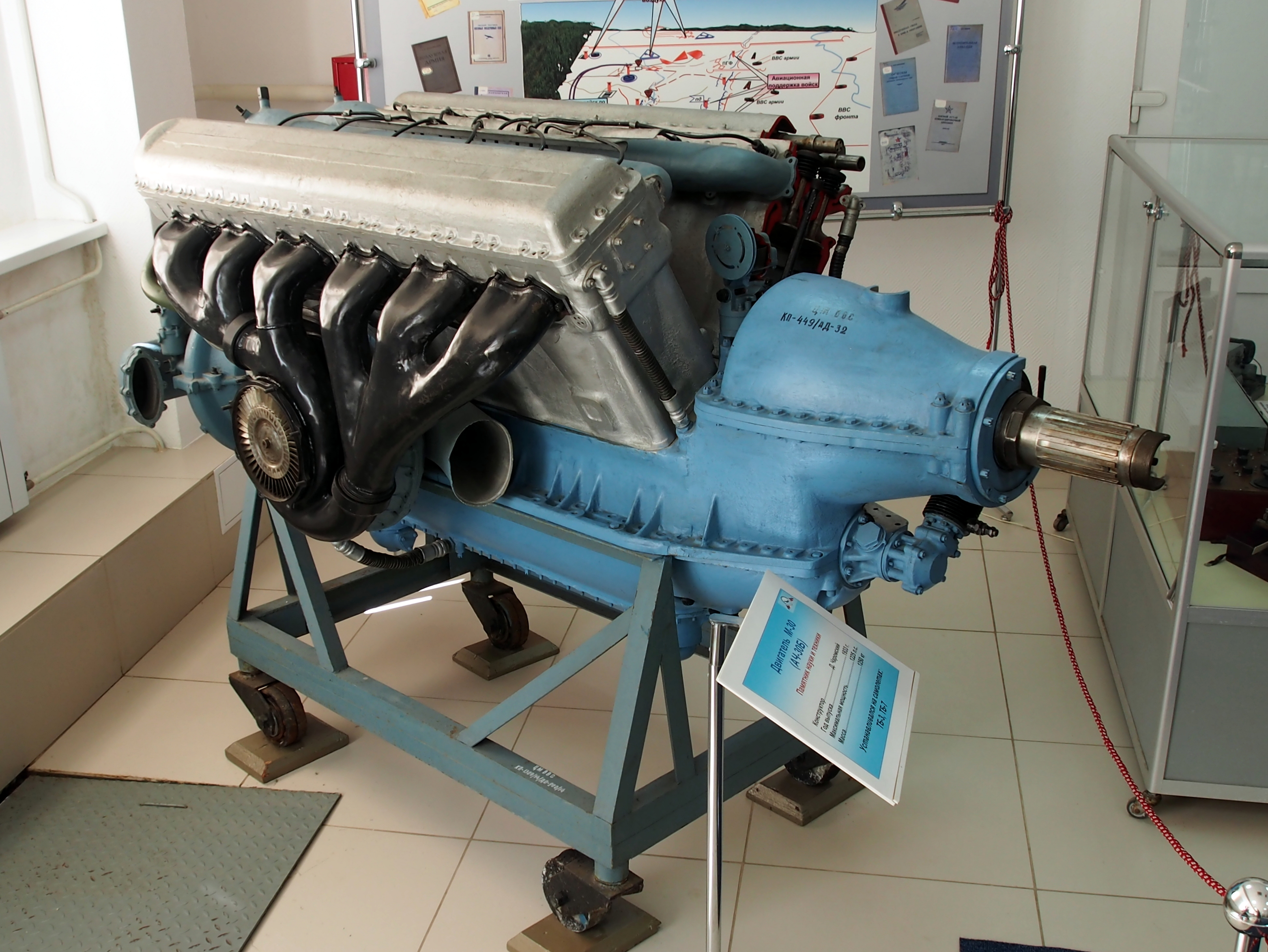
- An ACh-30B on display at the Central Air Force Museum
- Type: Liquid-cooled V-12 turbo-supercharged diesel engine
- National origin: Soviet Union
- Manufacturer: Charomskiy
- First run: about 1940
- Major applications: Petlyakov Pe-8; Yermolayev Yer-2
- Manufactured: 1940–1945
- Number built: 1526

The Charomskiy ACh-30 was a Soviet aircraft diesel engine developed during World War II. The initial version was not very satisfactory and it was cancelled when its factory was forced to evacuate in the autumn of 1941. Production was reinitiated in the summer of 1942 and continued until September 1945 to meet the need for an economical engine to power the Soviet long-range bombers like the Petlyakov Pe-8 and the Yermolayev Yer-2.

== Development ==
The ACh-30 was a development of the experimental AN-1RTK turbo-supercharged diesel engine that had begun development in the early 1930s. It was initially designated as the AD-5 when development began in the sharashka attached to Factory (Zavod) No. 82 at Tushino Airport in 1939. Construction of the first five prototypes began at the end of that year and it passed its tests in early 1940. Preparations to begin series manufacture at Factory No. 82 began in May 1940, but actual production was delayed until 1941 when forty-four were built as the M-30. Production was planned to be transferred to the Kharkov Tractor Factory, but this was cancelled before any engines were built. The M-30 had proven to be unsatisfactory in service, as it was unreliable and troublesome at high altitudes and in cold conditions. Specific problems were its failure to deliver full rpm and it suffered from oil blowouts and failures of the oil pumps. Production was cancelled when Factory No. 82 was forced to evacuate in the fall of 1941 because of the German advance on Moscow.

Production was reinitiated in the evacuated workshops of Factory No. 82 by Factory No. 500 in June 1942, thirty-two engines being completed during the year. Development of supercharged versions began about the same time, using geared, centrifugal-type superchargers adapted from the Mikulin AM-38 and the Klimov M-105 engines with intercoolers. That from the AM-38 was more successful and was put into production as the M-30B. Thirty-five incomplete M-30 engines were modified beginning in August into M-30Bs and then thirty-four M-30Bs were produced during the rest of 1942. Oddly the ACh-30B, as the engine was now known, was not formally accepted for series production until 19 June 1943, although production had begun quite a bit earlier than that. Factory No. 45 began production in the fourth quarter of 1943. Some 1450 ACh-30Bs were built before production ended at both factories in September 1945.

The ACh-30B was tested as a motorjet in which the jet engine's compressor was driven by an incorporated piston engine (as opposed to being driven by a turbine extracting power from the jet's exhaust as in a normal turbojet). It was bench tested from June 1944 through May 1945, but was never installed in any aircraft. The jet engine's thrust was 1,925 lbf (8.56 kN) and the equivalent horsepower of the combination was 4,500 hp (3,400 kW). The combination weighed 1,700 kg (3,700 lb).

Versions of the ACh-30 were evaluated on the Ilyushin Il-6 and the ANT-67, a long-range version of the Tupolev Tu-2, but neither aircraft was put into production. It was also proposed for use on the Tupolev Tu-8S and the MN executive transport, but neither of those projects progressed past design proposal stage.

== Variants ==
- AD-5, M-30, ACh-30 – four turbochargers, but no supercharger. Weight: 1,200 kg (2,600 lb), Power: 1,500 hp (1,100 kW), approximately 76 built.
- M-30F – 1942 prototype. Power: 1,750 hp (1,300 kW)
- M-30B, ACh-30B – main production variant, 1450 built.
- M-30D – boosted version for an attack aircraft with 2,000 hp (1,500 kW). Factory No. 500 ordered to develop this version, but no further information is known.
- M50-T – throttled version of ACh-30 for a torpedo boat and tank IS-7. Power: 1,050 hp (780 kW)
- ACh-30BF – Boosted version of the ACh-30B. Weight: 1,280 kg (2,820 lb), Power: 1,900 hp (1,400 kW), 17 built by modifying standard ACh-30Bs.
- TD-30B tank engine – a post-war development that later led to the TD11B tank engine.
- M-850 – modification of M50-T with 1,090 hp (810 kW) for Object 277 heavy tank prototype.

== Applications ==
- Ilyushin Il-6
- Petlyakov Pe-8
- Yermolayev Yer-2
- Ilyushin Il-12 (projected but not implemented)

== Specifications (ACh-30B) ==
Data from Kotelnikov, Russian Piston Aero Engines

=== General characteristics ===
- Type: V-12, turbo-supercharged, four-stroke, diesel engine
- Bore: 180 mm (7.1 in)
- Stroke: 200 mm (7.9 in)
- Displacement: 61.04 L (3,725 cu in)
- Dry weight: 1,290 kg (2,840 lb)

=== Components ===
- Supercharger: geared, centrifugal type supercharger
- Turbocharger: 2 x T1-82
- Fuel type: diesel
- Cooling system: liquid-cooled

=== Performance ===
- Power output: 1,500 hp (1,100 kW)
- Compression ratio: 13.5:1

== See also ==
Related development

- Charomskiy M-40

Comparable engines

- Junkers Jumo 204
- Junkers Jumo 205

Related lists

- List of aircraft engines
