= No. 46 Squadron (Finland) =

No. 46 Squadron Finnish Air Force
- Country: Finland
- Branch: Finnish Air Force
- Role: bomber
- Engagements: Winter War, Continuation War

No. 46 Squadron (Finnish: Lentolaivue 46 or LLv.46, from 3 May 1942 Le.Lv.46), renamed No. 46 Bomber Squadron (Finnish: Pommituslentolaivue 46 or PLe.Lv.46 on 14 February 1944) was a bomber squadron of the Finnish Air Force during World War II. The squadron was part of Flying Regiment 4.

== Organization ==
=== Winter War ===
- 1st Flight (1. Lentue)
- 2nd Flight (2. Lentue)
- 3rd Flight (3. Lentue)

The Squadron was equipped with 9 Bristol Blenheim Mk.Is and 11 Bristol Blenheim Mk.IVs.

=== Continuation War ===
- 1st Flight (1. Lentue)
- 2nd Flight (2. Lentue)
- 3rd Flight (3. Lentue)
  - 1st Flight of No. 48 Bomber Squadron (1./PLe.Lv.48)
- Separate Photography Flight (Erillinen valokuvauslentue)

The equipment consisted of 15 Dornier Do 17Zs, 3 Bristol Blenheim Mk.IVs, 4 Ilyushin DB-3Ms, 3 Ilyushin Il-4s, 1 Douglas DC-2, and 1 Junkers aircraft.

The following 15 Do 17s were received:

- Dornier Do 17 Z-2, WkNr 3323, BC+NE. Redesignated DN-51. Flew 454 hours 25 minutes mission time. Destroyed/written off on 9 October 1944. + Ten were lost between January 1943 and January 1945, the remaining five were not scrapped until in 1952.
- Dornier Do 17 Z-3, WkNr 2608, DM+DV. Redesignated DN-52. Scrapped 19 September 1952.
- Dornier Do 17 Z-3, WkNr 4242, DC+PZ. Redesignated DN-53. Flew 220 hours 5 minutes mission time. Destroyed 8 August 1943.
- Dornier Do 17 Z-3, WkNr 2856, PF+CW. Redesignated DN-54. Flew 358 hours 35 minutes mission time. Destroyed 9 October 1944.
- Dornier Do 17 Z-3, WkNr 3498, V5+MH. Redesignated DN-55. Logged 812 hours 5 minutes flying time. Scrapped 19 September 1952.
- Dornier Do 17 Z-2, WkNr 3425, V5+BK. Redesignated DN-56. 639 hours 40 minutes mission time. Destroyed 9 October 1944.
- Dornier Do 17 Z-1, WkNr 1155, C4+BZ. Redesignated DN-57. Logged 812 hours 5 minutes flying time. Scrapped 11 December 1952.
- Dornier Do 17 Z-3, WkNr 2905, 5K+DV. Redesignated DN-58. Scrapped 19 September 1952.
- Dornier Do 17 Z-1, WkNr 3228, V5+GL. Redesignated DN-59. Flew 884 hours 50 minutes mission time. Destroyed 9 September 1944.
- Dornier Do 17 Z-3, WkNr 2818, 5K+CR. Redesignated DN-60. Flew 479 hours 5 minutes mission time. Destroyed 11 January 1945.
- Dornier Do 17 Z-2, WkNr 4187, CQ+HG. Redesignated DN-61. Flew 348 hours 15 minutes mission time. Destroyed 9 October 1944.
- Dornier Do 17 Z-3, WkNr 1218, V5+3L. Redesignated DN-62. Flew 704 hours 30 minutes mission time. Destroyed 9 January 1943.
- Dornier Do 17 Z-3, WkNr 2873, PF+DN. Redesignated DN-63. Flew 505 hours 5 minutes mission time. Destroyed 9 September 1944.
- Dornier Do 17 Z-3, WkNr 2622, 5M+L. Redesignated DN-64. Scrapped 19 September 1952.
- Dornier Do 17 Z-1, WkNr 1175, PG+GA. Redesignated DN-65. Flew 95 hours 30 minutes mission time. Destroyed 16 July 1943.
