= List of Ilyushin aircraft =

This is a list of aircraft produced by Ilyushin, a Russian aircraft manufacturer.

== List of aircraft ==
Notable Ilyushin aircraft include:

=== Fighters ===
- I-21 (TsKB-32) fighter, 1936.
- Il-1 fighter prototype, 1944.

=== Ground-attack ===
- Il-2 Shturmovik ground-attack aircraft, NATO codename "Bark", 1939, most-produced military aircraft of all time.
- Il-6 (TsKB-60) ground attack aircraft project developed from the Il-2, 1941. Canceled due to the Il-8 and Il-10.
- Il-8, ground-attack prototype developed from the Il-2 and intended as a Il-2 replacement, 1943.
- Il-10 "Beast", ground-attack aircraft developed from the Il-1, 1944.
- Il-16 ground-attack prototype developed from the Il-10, 1945.
- Il-20 ground-attack prototype; intended as a Il-10 replacement, 1948.
- Il-40 "Brawny" jet-powered ground-attack prototype, 1953.

=== Bombers ===
- DB-3 (TsKB-30) long-range bomber, 1935.
- Il-4 "Bob" bomber/torpedo bomber developed from the DB-3, 1939.
- DB-4 (TsKB-56) long-range bomber prototype, 1940.
- Il-6 long-range bomber prototype developed from the Il-4 and Ilyushin's last piston-engined bomber, 1942.
- Il-22 jet-powered bomber prototype, world's first 4-engined straight-wing aircraft, 1947.
- Il-28 "Beagle" and "Mascot" medium bomber/trainer, world's first twinjet with an afterburner, 1948.
- Il-30 tactical swept wing bomber prototype developed from the Il-28, 1951.
- Il-46 jet-powered bomber prototype developed from the Il-30, 1952.
- Il-54 "Blowlamp" supersonic bomber prototype, 1955. Initially known as Il-149.

=== Transport ===
- Il-12 "Coach" twin-engine cargo/transport aircraft, 1945.
- Il-32 cargo glider prototype, 1948.
- Il-76 "Candid", strategic airlifter, world's most-produced aircraft of its class, 1971.
  - Il-78 "Midas", an aerial refuelling variant of the Il-76, 1982.
  - Il-82 airborne command post developed from the Il-76.
  - Il-476 internal designation for the Il-76MD-90A.
- Il-112 light military transport prototype, 2019. Renamed to Il-212 in 2023 and powered by jet engines.
- Il-276 medium-lift military transport aircraft, previously designated as Il-214.

=== Passenger aircraft ===
- Il-14 "Crate" twin-engine transport aircraft developed from the Il-12, 1950.
- Il-18 "Clam" four-engine airliner prototype, 1946.
- Il-18 "Coot" turboprop airliner, one of world's principal transport for decades, 1957.
- Il-62 "Classic" long-range jet airliner, world's largest airliner when first flew, world's first mass-produced airliner of its category, 1963.
- Il-86 "Camber" medium-range wide-body jet airliner and first quadjet with two full decks, 1976.
  - Il-80 "Maxdome" airborne command post developed from the Il-86, 1985.
  - Il-87 "Aimak" airborne control variant of the Il-86.
- Il-96 long-haul widebody airliner developed from the Il-86, world's fastest wide-body aircraft, 1988.
  - Il-98 aerial refueling variant of the Il-96.
- Il-114 regional aircraft, 1990.

=== Reconnaissance aircraft ===
- Il-20M "Coot-A" ELINT/radar reconnaissance version of the Il-18
- Il-22 "Coot-B" airborne command post version of the Il-18.
- Il-24 "Coot-C" ice reconnaissance version similar to Il-20M, 1948.
- Il-38 "May" maritime patrol/anti-submarine warfare aircraft developed from the Il-18, 1971.
- Il-140 AWACS version of Il-114.
- A-50 Shmel (from Beriev), an AWACS variant of the Il-76, NATO codename "Mainstay", 1978.
- A-100 Premier (from Beriev), an AWACS variant of the Il-76MD-90A.

=== Trainer aircraft ===
- Il-103 light trainer, 1994.

=== Experimental and projects ===
- TsKB-6, six-seat passenger/utility aircraft project, 1933.
- TsKB-26, proof of concept prototype for DB-3.
- M Sh, attack aircraft project, 1942.
- Il-14 (1944), four-engine high-speed bomber project, 1944.
- Il-16 (1954), four-engine jet airliner project, 1954. Resembled the Tupolev Tu-110; cancelled due to the Tu-104.
- Il-24, twin-engine jet bomber project derived from the Il-22, 1947.
- Il-26, long-range bomber project, 1947.
- Il-34, projected motorized variant of Il-32, 1948.
- Il-36, long-range high-altitude reconnaissance aircraft project, 1949.
- Il-38 (1948), bomber project, 1948.
- Il-42 Sturmovik, ground-attack project developed from the Il-40, late 1960s. Lost to the Sukhoi T-8.
- Il-48, medium front line bomber project, 1949.
- Il-52, flying wing bomber project.
- Il-56, front line bomber project, 1955.
- Il-58, carrier-based attack aircraft project, competitor to the Tupolev Tu-91, 1952.
- Il-60, four-engine military transport project, 1960. Lost to the Antonov An-22.
- Il-64, twin-engine (later four-engine) airliner project, proposed Il-14 replacement, 1960; cancelled in favor of the Il-62.
- Il-66 (1959), supersonic transport (SST) project, 1959.
- Il-66, military transport project, early 1960s.
- Il-68, airliner project.
- Il-70 (1961), four-engine short-haul airliner project, 1961; cancelled in favor of the Yak-40.
- Il-70 (1969), AEW aircraft project, 1969
- Il-72 (1961), supersonic airliner project developed from the Il-66, 1961.
- Il-72 (1964), trijet medium-haul airliner project, 1964.
- Il-74, trijet airliner project, enlarged Il-72 and competitor to the Tu-154, 1966. Lost to the Tu-154.
- Il-76 (1967), 250 passenger, double deck airliner ("airbus"), 1967.
- Il-82 (1968), twin-engine airliner project, proposed Tu-134 replacement, 1968; cancelled in favor of the Tu-134.
- Il-84, search-and-rescue (SAR) variant of the Il-76, project cancelled, 1989.
- Il-88, transport aircraft project, 1972; cancelled due to the An-70.
- Il-90, proposed long-haul airliner, 1988.
- Il-98, proposed twin-engine version of the Il-96-300, 2000.
- Il-100, light multi-purpose aircraft project, 2001.
- Il-102, experimental jet-powered ground-attack aircraft, 1982. Cancelled in favor of the Su-25.
- Il-106, proposed heavy military transport, proposed Il-76 replacement, 1992. Reused for the PAK VTA project.
- Il-108, business jet prototype, project abandoned, 1990.
- Il-116, regional propliner project.
- Il-118, proposed twin turboprop engine version of Il-18, 1984.
- Il-126, proposed business jet
- Il-196, long-range, high-capacity airliner project.
- A-60, experimental airborne laser laboratory developed from the Il-76MD, 1981.

== Gallery ==
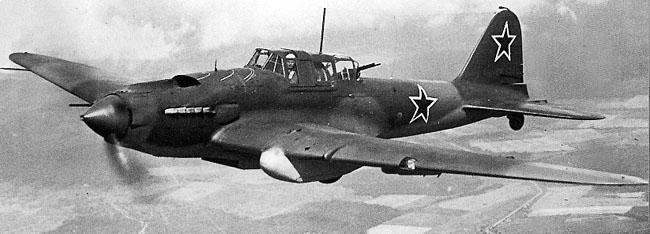
Il-2 Shturmovik

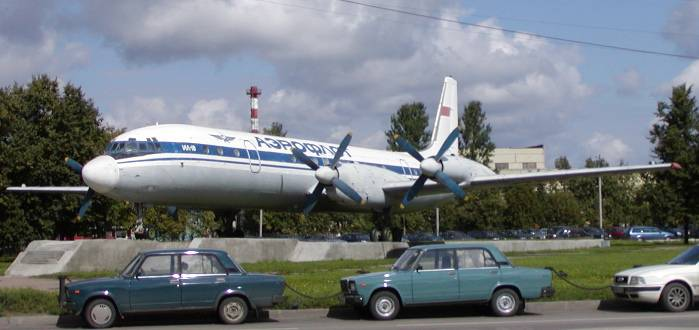
Il-18 'Coot' on display

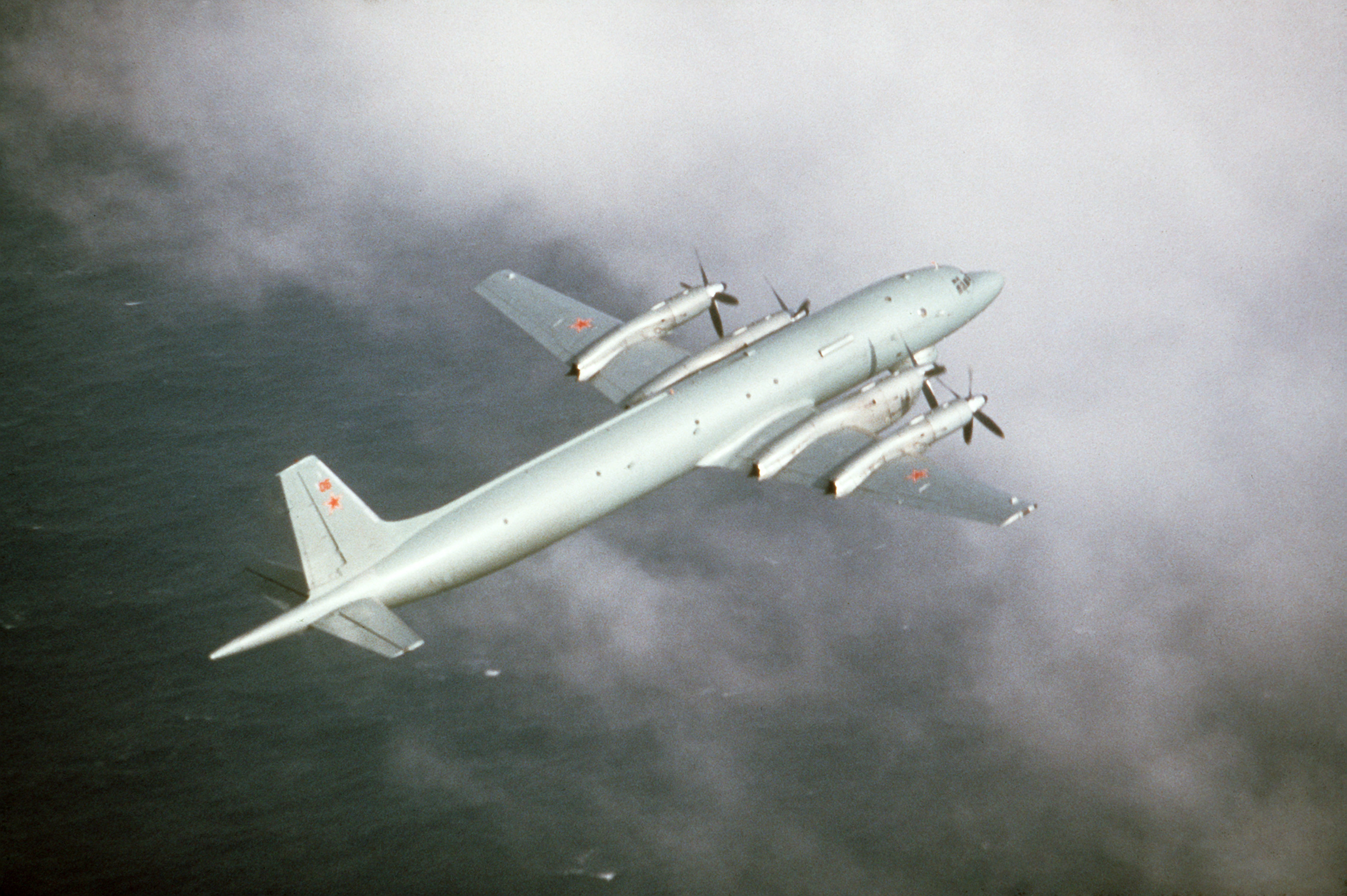
Il-38 'May'

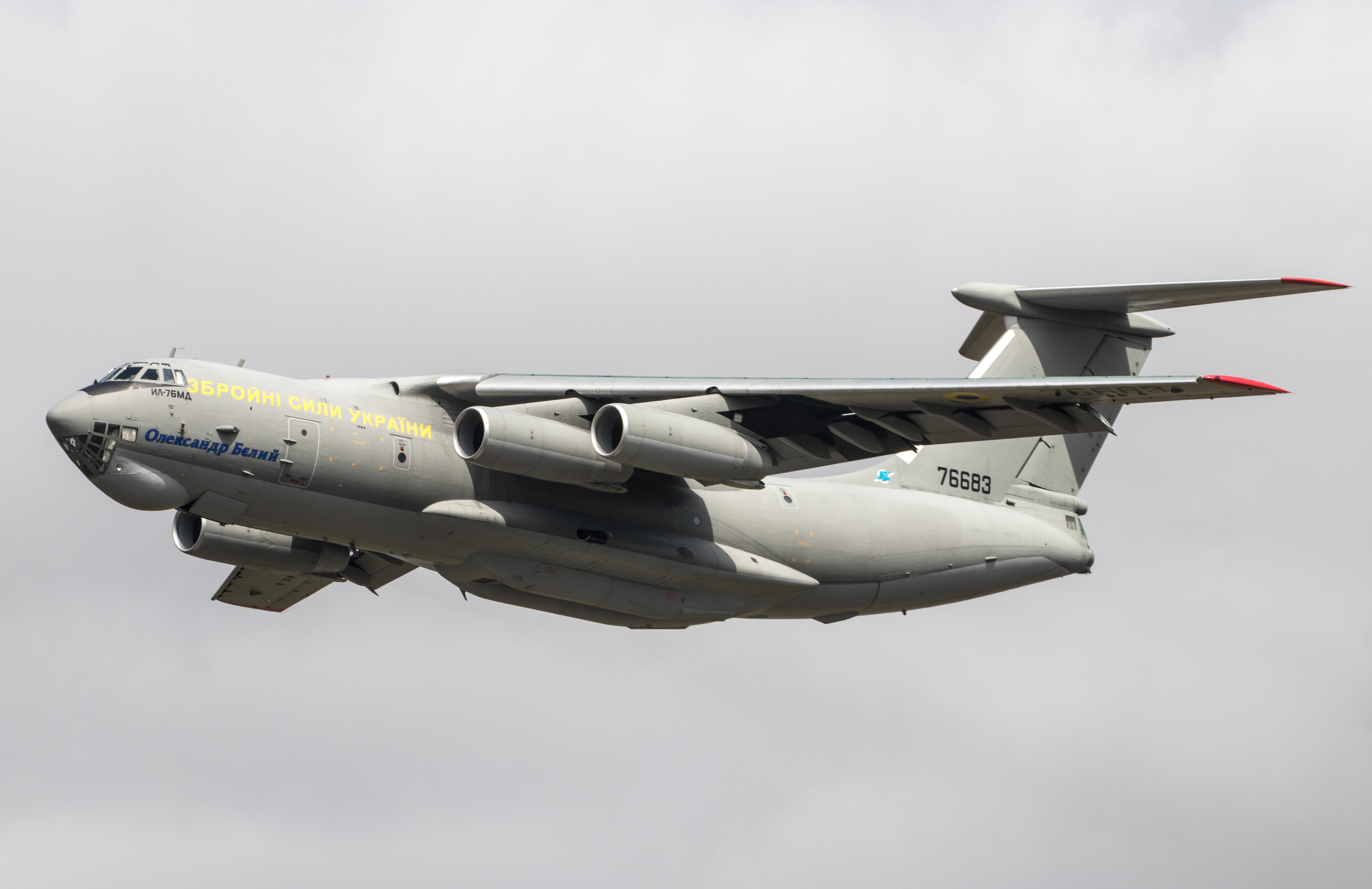
Ilyushin Il-76

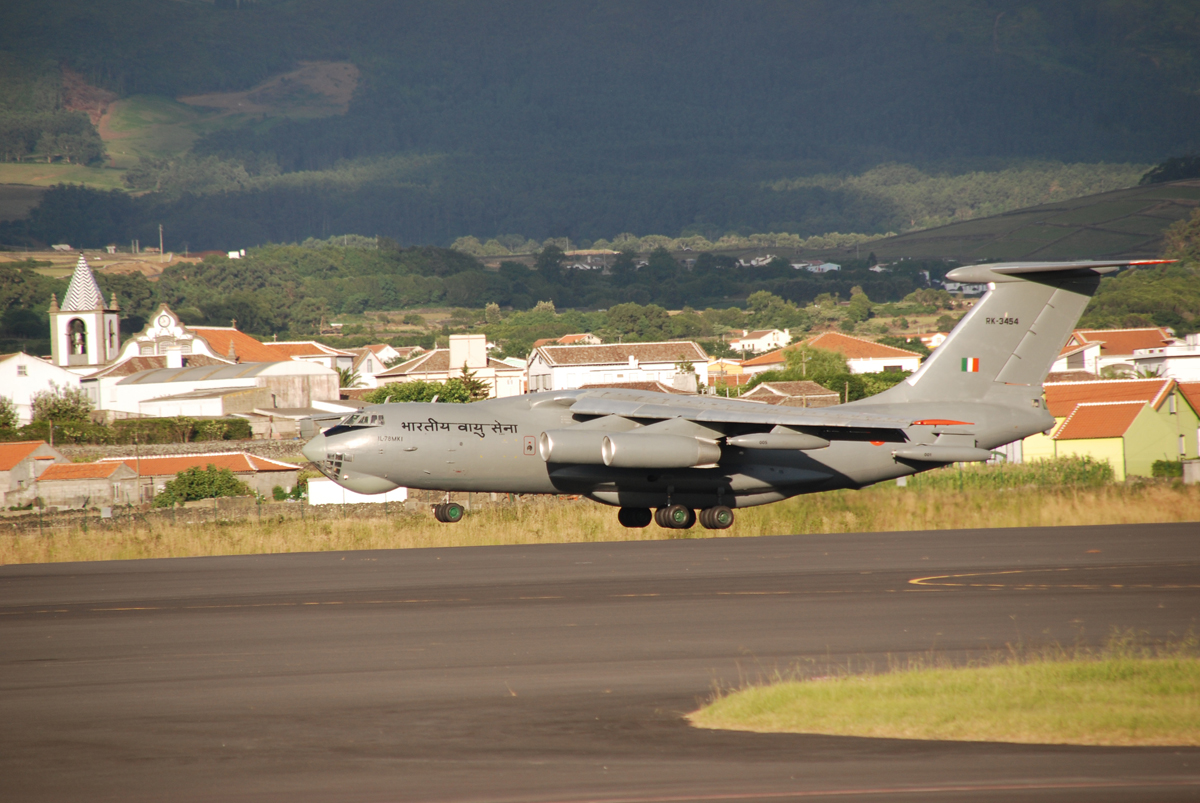
Il-78 'Midas'

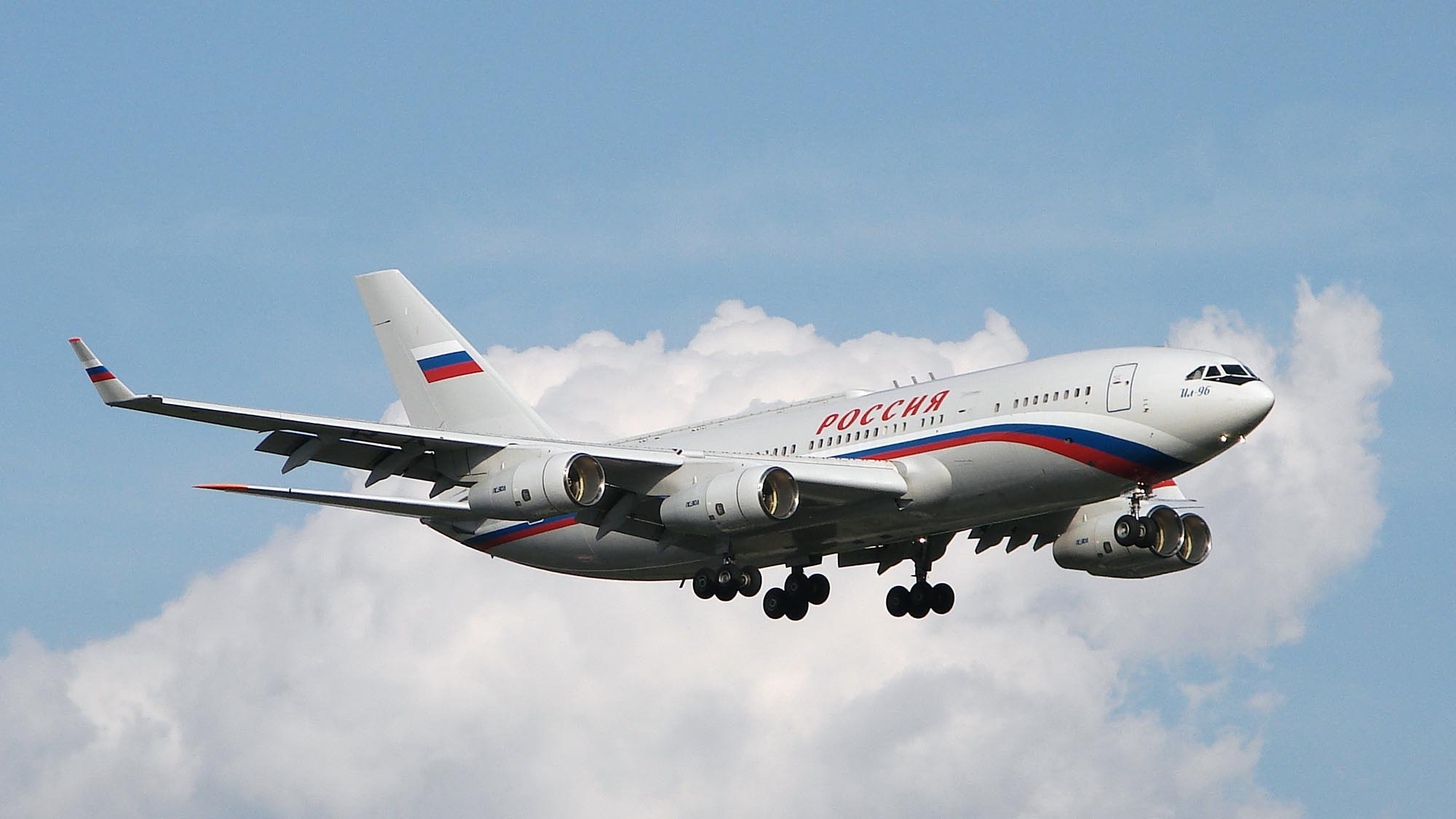
Il-96
