= IL-26 =

IL-26, IL 26, or IL26 may refer to:

- Interleukin 26
- Illinois's 26th congressional district, an obsolete district
- Illinois Route 26
- Ilyushin Il-26
