= Ilyushin PAK VTA =

Russian military program to propose a next-generation heavy military transport aircraft

PAK VTA

General information
- Type: Heavy transport aircraft
- National origin: Russia
- Manufacturer: Ilyushin
- Status: Under development
- Primary user: Russian Aerospace Forces

History
- First flight: Unknown
- Developed from: Ilyushin Il-106

The PAK VTA (Russian: ПАК ВТА, short for: Перспективный авиационный комплекс Военно-транспортной авиации, romanized: Perspektivnyy aviatsionnyy kompleks Voyenno-transportnoy aviatsii, lit. ''Prospective Aviation Complex of Military Transport Aviation'') is a Russian next-generation heavy military transport aircraft, currently under development by Ilyushin.

The aircraft is intended to replace the Antonov An-22 and the Antonov An-124 heavy airlifter in Russia's Air Force service; its airframe will be based on the cancelled Ilyushin Il-106 (Russian: Илью́шин Ил-106) of the nineties, but upgraded with new engines and avionics.

== Development ==
The project was initially presented under PAK TA designation, with the goal to develop a blended wing body, super-heavy transport plane being able to carry 90 tons of cargo, and partially using electric energy. 80 aircraft were planned to be built by 2024.

In 2016, General Director of Ilyushin Company Sergei Velmozhkin reported the project was based on Ilyushin Il-106, a cancelled Ilyushin transport plane of the 1990s. In December 2018, Russian Defence Ministry announced the aircraft would be a deeply updated version of Il-106. According to Chief Designer of Ilyushin Company Nikolai Talikov, the aircraft will be updated with new avionics, engines, and other critical systems. The first flight is scheduled for 2024–2026.

In May 2019, Ilyushin has finished initial R&D works on the aircraft and contract for further development has been signed. If the PAK VTA design is approved by the Russian authorities, Ilyushin hopes to start the development of the first prototype in 2020, for a serial production before 2027. The first flight is scheduled for 2024-2026.

On 4 August 2020, Izvestia reported that the Russian Ministry of Defence approved the tactical and technical requirements of the PAK VTA. The research phase was set to end in December 2020, with the experimental development work on the aircraft to begin in 2021. According to reporting by Kommersant in 2025, Ulyanovsk Region Governor Alexey Russkikh said that Aviastar — the Il-76 manufacturer — plans to produce two new transport aircraft: the Il-100, the heavy PAK TA design formerly known as the Il-106, and the Il-276 medium transport, suggesting that development continues.

== Characteristics ==
According to the approved requirements, the new military transport aircraft should be able to refuel in the air and carry no less than 80 tons of cargo at a distance of 5000 kilometers. The length of the cargo compartment of the aircraft would need to be at least 27.5 meters, with a width of 5.8 meters, and a height of 4.4 meters.

PAK VTA should be powered by four PD-26 turbofans - an improved derivative of the still-in-development PD-35 engine, with a thrust of 20–25 thousand kgf. The flight altitude of the aircraft should be up to 12 thousand meters, with a cruising speed of 850 km/h.

== See also ==
Aircraft of comparable role, configuration, and era

- Antonov An-124 Ruslan
- Boeing C-17 Globemaster III
- Xi'an Y-20
- Lockheed C-5 Galaxy
