= Kuznetsov NK-92 =

1980s Russian turbofan aircraft engine design study

The Kuznetsov NK-92 was a military engine with a super-high bypass ratio. The NK-92 was proposed to power the Ilyushin Il-106 heavy military transport aircraft. Development of the Il-106 aircraft and its NK-92 engine slowed in the early 1990s. However, aspects of the engine's design were applied to the NK-92's civil engine counterpart, the Kuznetsov NK-93, which was tested in flight in the first decade of the 2000s.

A ducted propfan engine with contra-rotating fans, the NK-92 was also a powerplant option on versions of the Ilyushin Il-90 and Ilyushin Il-96 widebody passenger airliners and the EKIP "flying saucer" lifting body aircraft.
