= Ilyushin Il-90 =

Proposed airliner by Ilyushin

General information
- Type: Twin-engine wide-body airliner
- Designer: Ilyushin Design Bureau
- Status: Cancelled

History
- Introduction date: 1988

The Ilyushin Il-90 was a twin-engine, widebody aircraft proposed by the Ilyushin Design Bureau. First mentioned at the Farnborough air show in 1988, the Il-90 was a replacement for the Ilyushin Il-62M long-range narrowbody airliner.

The Il-90 was designed to carry 200 passengers a distance of 5,900 to 7,000 nautical miles (11,000 to 13,000 kilometres; 6,800 to 8,100 miles). On a 540 nmi (1,000 km; 620 mi) sector, per-passenger fuel consumption would be 18 to 19 grams per kilometre (1.0 to 1.1 ounces per mile). Powerplant choices included the NK-92, an 18,000-kilogram-force thrust (177-kilonewton; 40,000-pound-force) ducted propfan engine that was related to the Kuznetsov NK-93.
