= Ilyushin Il-20 (1948) =

Attack aircraft prototype by Ilyushin

- Il-20 schematic

General information
- Type: Ground-attack aircraft prototype
- Manufacturer: Ilyushin
- Number built: 1

History
- First flight: 5 December 1948

The Ilyushin Il-20 was a Soviet prototype for a heavily armored ground-attack aircraft to replace the Ilyushin Il-10. It featured a number of innovative concepts including a cockpit mounted on top of the engine, directly behind the propeller, and wing-mounted autocannon that could be adjusted on the ground to fire level or depressed 23° to allow the aircraft to strafe ground targets while remaining in level flight. However it was slower than the Il-10, and its M-47 engine was problematic in flight tests in 1948–49. It was not placed into production. The test pilots called the aircraft the Gorbach (Hunchback).

== Development ==
Ilyushin's concept to meet the 1947 requirement for a superior aircraft to the Il-10 in performance and firepower was a heavily armored, single-engine, all-metal, low-wing monoplane powered by the newly developed M-47—also known as the MF-45Sh or M-45Sh—liquid-cooled engine, which developed 3,000 horsepower (2,200 kW) at takeoff. The design's most notable feature was the pilot's cockpit mounted directly above the engine, reminiscent of the Blackburn Blackburn and Blackburn Cubaroo. Furthermore, the cockpit was situated directly behind the four-bladed propeller to maximize pilot visibility. The windshield extended down to the propeller hub and provided the pilot with a 37° downward field of view; in a medium dive he could view targets directly underneath the aircraft.

As was traditional with Ilyushin's ground-attack aircraft the Il-20 used a load-bearing armored shell to protect the pilot and gunner as well as the engine, fuel, lubrication and cooling systems. The thickness of the armor varied between 6 and 15 mm (0.24 and 0.59 in) and weighed a total of 1,840 kg (4,060 lb). The pilot's canopy used armored glass 100 mm (3.9 in) thick for the main windshield and 65 mm (2.6 in) for the quarterlights.

A wide variety of armament suites were considered for the Il-20. One involved two wing-mounted 23 mm (0.91 in) cannon and two others mounted in the fuselage, fixed downwards at a 23° angle for strafing targets in level flight. This version's normal bombload was only 400 kg (880 lb), but 700 kg (1,500 lb) could be carried in overload condition or four RS-132 rockets could be carried instead. Another version used one 45 mm (1.8 in) cannon, two 23 mm guns and six underwing rockets. Most studies placed the rear gunner in a dorsal turret separated from the cockpit by the main fuel tank, but one study put him in an armored Il-K8 rear turret, but this required a longer fuselage and moving the wings aft to maintain the CG in the right place.

The obliquely-mounted fuselage cannon were thought to be too difficult to aim and were not included in the prototype; the weight savings allowed the ammunition for the four 23 mm Shpital'nyy Sh-3 wing-mounted guns to be increased to 900 rounds. One additional innovation in the prototype was that they could be adjusted on the ground to fire at a 23° downward angle in addition to the normal level position. The dorsal gunner also fired a Sh-3 gun, which was mounted in a separate, remotely controlled, Il-VU-11 turret that could traverse through 180° and elevated to a maximum of 80°. A cassette of ten AG-2 aerial grenades was provided to deter any fighters approaching from below. Maximum bomb load was 1,190 kg (2,620 lb) and four bomb bays were provided in the wing center-section for small bombs. Alternatively two 500 kg (1,100 lb) bombs could be carried on wing racks. Launch rails were provided for four 132 mm (5.2 in) RS-132 rockets.

The prototype was completed on 27 November 1948 and its first flight was shortly afterwards on 4 December. The best speed that the Il-20 could manage was only 515 km/h (320 mph) at an altitude of 2,800 m (9,200 ft), 36 km/h (22 mph) slower than the Il-10 at the same altitude, possibly a consequence of the increased drag and weight penalties inherent in the greater fuselage cross-section and area as a result of the placement of the pilot above the engine. The new M-47 engine proved to be defective with severe vibration problems. Other problems were that the Air Force was not satisfied with the armament and that access to the engine for routine maintenance was severely hampered by the placement of the cockpit over the engine. Another concern was the close placement of the cockpit to the propeller; this was believed to increase the risk to the pilot if he had to bail out or make a belly landing—in which case the bent propeller blades might hit the canopy.

These issues, coupled with emerging jet engine technology, led to the cancellation of the Il-20 program on 14 May 1949.

== Specifications (Il-20) ==
Data from The Osprey Encyclopedia of Russian Aircraft from 1875 - 1995

General characteristics

- Crew: 2
- Length: 13.58 m (44 ft 7 in)
- Wingspan: 15.43 m (50 ft 7 in)
- Wing area: 44 m^{2} (470 sq ft)
- Airfoil: Clark YH
- Empty weight: 7,500 kg (16,535 lb)
- Gross weight: 9,500 kg (20,944 lb)
- Powerplant: 1 × M-47 V-12 liquid-cooled piston engine, 2,200 kW (3,000 hp)
- Propellers: 4-bladed constant speed propeller

Performance

- Maximum speed: 515 km/h (320 mph, 278 kn)
- Range: 1,680 km (1,040 mi, 910 nmi)
- Service ceiling: 7,750 m (25,430 ft)
- Time to altitude: 5,000 m (16,404 ft) in 8 minutes
- Wing loading: 223 kg/m^{2} (46 lb/sq ft)
- Power/mass: 0.23 kW/kg (0.14 hp/lb)

Armament

- Guns:

- 1 × Sh-3 23 mm (0.906 in) cannon mounted in an Il-VU-11 turret
- 4 × Sh-3 23 mm (0.906 in) cannon in adjustable mounts outboard of the main undercarriage legs

- Rockets: :

- 4 × RS-132 132 mm (5.20 in) rockets

- Bombs: :
  - 1,190 kg of bombs
