= Ilyushin Il-40 =

1953 attack aircraft prototype by Ilyushin

- Ilyushin Il-40P, the second prototype

General information
- Type: Ground-attack aircraft
- National origin: Soviet Union
- Manufacturer: Ilyushin
- Status: Prototype
- Number built: 7

History
- First flight: 7 March 1953

The Ilyushin Il-40 (NATO reporting name: Brawny) was a two-seat Soviet jet-engined armored ground-attack aircraft.

The first prototype flew in 1953 and was very successful except when it fired its guns, as their combustion gasses disturbed the airflow into the engines and caused them to flameout or hiccup. Remedying this problem took over a year and involved the radical change of moving the engine air intakes all the way to the very front of the aircraft and repositioning the guns from the tip of the nose to the bottom of the fuselage, just behind the nosewheel. The aircraft, now resembling a double-barreled shotgun from the front, was ordered into production in 1955. Only five production aircraft had been completed before the entire program was canceled in early 1956 when the VVS discarded its close air-support doctrine in favor of tactical nuclear weapons on the battlefield.

== Development ==
Sergey Ilyushin had begun design studies during 1950–51 for a jet-engined ground-attack aircraft possessing better performance characteristics than was possible with piston-engined aircraft. By the end of 1951 the Ilyushin design bureau had prepared a technical proposal for a two-seat armored aircraft using two Mikulin AM-5 axial-flow turbojets rated at 2,150 kgf (4,740 lbf) at maximum power (without afterburner) and 2,700 kgf (5,952 lbf) with afterburner. In January 1952 Ilyushin sent this proposal to the government, which was quickly accepted, and he was directed to design and build one prototype.

The Il-40 had wings set low on the fuselage, swept back at an angle of 35°, and a tricycle undercarriage. The two AM-5 engines were in pods adjacent to the fuselage. As was traditional for Ilyushin ground-attack aircraft, the core of Il-40's structure was a load-bearing armored shell that protected both crew positions, six fuel tanks and part of the radio and electrical equipment. The thickness of the shell ranged from 3 to 8 mm (0.12 to 0.31 in) in thickness. The armored bulkhead protecting the pilot from the front was 10 mm (0.39 in) thick. The cockpit glazing was also bulletproof and the pilot was given an 8 mm (0.31 in) armored headrest to protect him against shells fired from above and behind. The gunner was protected by armor 4–10 mm (0.16–0.39 in) thick. The total weight of the armored shell and the bulletproof glass was 1,918 kg (4,228 lb). Ejection seats were provided for both crewmembers. Three perforated airbrakes were fitted on the rear fuselage, one on each side and one underneath, to enhance the aircraft's maneuverability during a dive.

The initial armament was six 23 mm (0.91 in) Nudelman-Rikhter NR-23 autocannon mounted in the nose, three on each side, each with 150 rounds, with their muzzles protruding into the slipstream. One NR-23 was mounted in a remotely-controlled Il-K10 tail barbette with 200 rounds. It had a maximum elevation of 55°, a maximum depression of 40° and could traverse 60° to either side. The Il-K10 could traverse at a rate of 42° per second and elevate at a rate of 38° per second. Four small bomb bays were fitted in the wings with a maximum capacity of 100 kg (220 lb) each. Alternatively, four bomb racks could be fitted under the wings that could carry bombs up to 500 kg (1,100 lb),82 mm (3.2 in) TRS-82 or 132 mm (5.2 in) TRS-132 rockets, or drop tanks with a total capacity of 1,100 litres (290 US gal). The normal bombload was 400 kg (880 lb), but 1,000 kg (2,200 lb) could be carried at overload. Under overloaded conditions, a maximum of twelve TRS-82 or eight TRS-132 rockets could be carried. Two cameras were fitted in the rear fuselage for day and night damage-assessment photos.

The Il-40 first flew on 7 March 1953, and flight tests revealed no serious shortcomings in the air. The operational CG was too far aft, but this was only a minor problem when landing, taking off and taxiing, especially when coupled with the rather short wheelbase. The biggest problem proved to be the guns and their effect on the engines. During the first aerial test of the cannons at the end of March 1953 the muzzle flash temporarily blinded the pilot and both engines flamed out. The pilot was able to restart the engines and returned safely, but Sergey Ilyushin immediately started an investigation into the cause of the engine problems. Ground tests with high-speed cameras revealed that none of the muzzle brakes or blast suppressors tested made any difference; the engines would hiccup even if only a single gun fired just five to ten rounds.

A decision was made to replace the six NR-23 guns in the nose with four AM-23 cannon with 225 rounds per gun that had a rate of fire 50% greater than that of the NR-23 and to totally revise the gun installation. The guns were moved to the very tip of the nose in a separate compartment made of heat-resistant steel and provided with a special blast deflector chamber to deflect the blast gasses away from the engine inlets. Two doors were provided at the bottom of the chamber to ventilate the chamber while firing. One problem occurred almost immediately during testing when the blast gases accumulated in the section where spent cartridges and links were saved and sometimes ignited. Occasionally this was strong enough to actually deform the chamber. The spent shell case section was thoroughly ventilated and muzzle brakes were introduced to successfully cure the problem.

Resolving the problem with the guns had prevented the aircraft from undergoing its State acceptance trials in July 1953 as stipulated and a special commission was appointed to conduct the trials on 31 December 1953. After the manufacturer's trials were successfully concluded in January 1954 the aircraft was turned over and the State acceptance trials lasted from 21 January — 15 March 1954. The tests were generally successful with the Il-40 proving to be easy to fly, maneuverable enough to be a handful for the MiG-15bis and MiG-17 fighters opposing it and considerably superior to the piston-engined Ilyushin Il-10M ground-attack aircraft then in service. However flight tests did reveal blast gas ingestion when firing in a sideslip by the engine on the side opposite the sideslip. Several solutions were evaluated to cure the problem, but Ilyushin pushed for the more radical solution of extending the air intakes for the engines all the way to the nose of the aircraft and moving the guns to the bottom of the nose, behind the air intakes.

The change in position of the guns and the extension of the air intakes, which looked "uncannily like a double-barreled shotgun," allowed the nosewheel to be moved forward to lengthen the wheelbase. The guns were mounted behind the nosewheel well and a special shield was added to protect the gun barrels from debris thrown up by the nosewheel; it was mechanically linked to the nosewheel and extended when it did. Other changes included the replacement of the original AM-5F engines by the Tumansky RD-9V, an improved version of the AM-5F, the normal bombload was increased to 1,000 kg and 1,400 kg (3,100 lb) in overloaded condition, and a rearview mirror was added to allow the pilot to better observe the rear upper hemisphere.

== Production ==
Ilyushin began construction of another prototype to evaluate this solution and this was endorsed on 16 October 1954 when the Council of Ministers ordered production to begin at Factory (Zavod) No. 168 at Rostov-on-Don of the improved version, designated as the Il-40P. The Il-40P prototype first flew on 14 February 1955 and began State acceptance trials on 12 October 1955. The changes had resolved all the problems suffered by the earlier design and an order for a first batch of forty production machines was placed.

Five of these had been completed by the spring of 1956 and were undergoing preflight tests when the entire program was canceled on 13 April 1956 and all components in preparation scrapped. A week later, the Attack Aviation branch of the VVS was superseded by the Fighter-Bomber branch and the doctrine of the VVS was drastically modified. No longer would the VVS provide close support to the Army, but rather it would use tactical nuclear weapons as part of the nuclear battlefield.

Before the program was canceled, two variants had been studied by Ilyushin. The first was an artillery-spotting version known as the Il-40K. This model added a third crewman in a redesigned forward fuselage. The air intakes were reverted to their original position as the guns had been placed in the small wing bomb bays and there was no danger of the engines ingesting blast gasses from the guns. The spotter-navigator was given an extensively glazed position at the tip of the nose that was well-protected with armor and bulletproof glass. The first fuselage was nearing completion when the order came to cancel the entire program. The second variant was a torpedo-carrying version called the Il-40T which was based on the fuselage of the Il-40K, but the navigator-bombardier's position had optically flat glass panels to facilitate aiming. Not much effort was devoted to this model and it was canceled at an early stage.

== Variants ==
- Il-40 – First prototype
- Il-40P – Second prototype and five production aircraft.
- Il-40K – (korrektirovshchik – corrector) – Artillery spotter, three-seater with spotter-navigator in glazed nose cockpit.
- Il-40T – (torpedonosets) – Torpedo bomber, three-seater with navigator in glazed nose with optically flat panels for weapon aiming.
- Il-42 – Late 1960s revival of the Il-40 concept, beaten in competition with the Sukhoi T-8 (prototype Su-25)
- Il-102 – Ultimate iteration of the Il-40/Il-42, with modern avionics and engines, also beaten by the Sukhoi T-8.

== Specifications (Il-40P) ==
Data from OKB Ilyushin: A History of the Design Bureau and its Aircraft, The Osprey Encyclopedia of Russian Aircraft from 1875–1995

General characteristics

- Crew: 2
- Length: 17.215 m (56 ft 6 in)
- Wingspan: 17 m (55 ft 9 in)
- Height: 5.76 m (18 ft 11 in)
- Wing area: 54.1 m^{2} (582 sq ft)
- Airfoil: root: TsAGI SR-Yus-12; tip: TsAGI SR-11-12
- Empty weight: 8,500 kg (18,739 lb)
- Gross weight: 16,600 kg (36,597 lb)
- Max takeoff weight: 17,600 kg (38,801 lb)
- Powerplant: 2 × Tumansky RD-9V afterburning turbojet engines, 25.5 kN (5,730 lbf) thrust each dry, 31.9 kN (7,170 lbf) with afterburner

Performance

- Maximum speed: 993 km/h (617 mph, 536 kn)
- Range: 1,320 km (820 mi, 710 nmi) (with drop tanks)
- Service ceiling: 11,600 m (38,100 ft)
- Wing loading: 31.5 kg/m^{2} (6.5 lb/sq ft)

Armament

- Guns:
  - 4 × AM-23 23 mm cannon in the fuselage nose.
  - 1 × AM-23 23 mm cannon in remotely controlled rear turret
- Hardpoints: 4 underwing pylons carrying bombs, rockets or drop tanks
- Bombs: up to 1,400 kg (3,100 lb) of bombs in four wing bomb bays

== See also ==
Related development

- Ilyushin Il-102

Aircraft of comparable role, configuration, and era

- Douglas A-4 Skyhawk
- Saab A 32A Lansen
- Sud Aviation Vautour IIA
