= Saratov Aviation Plant =

Coordinates: 51°29′41″N 45°57′10″E

The Saratov Aviation Plant (Saratovskiy Aviatsionnyy Zavod, SAZ, Саратовский Авиационный Завод, САЗ) was a Russian/Soviet aircraft production facility, located in Saratov, Russia.

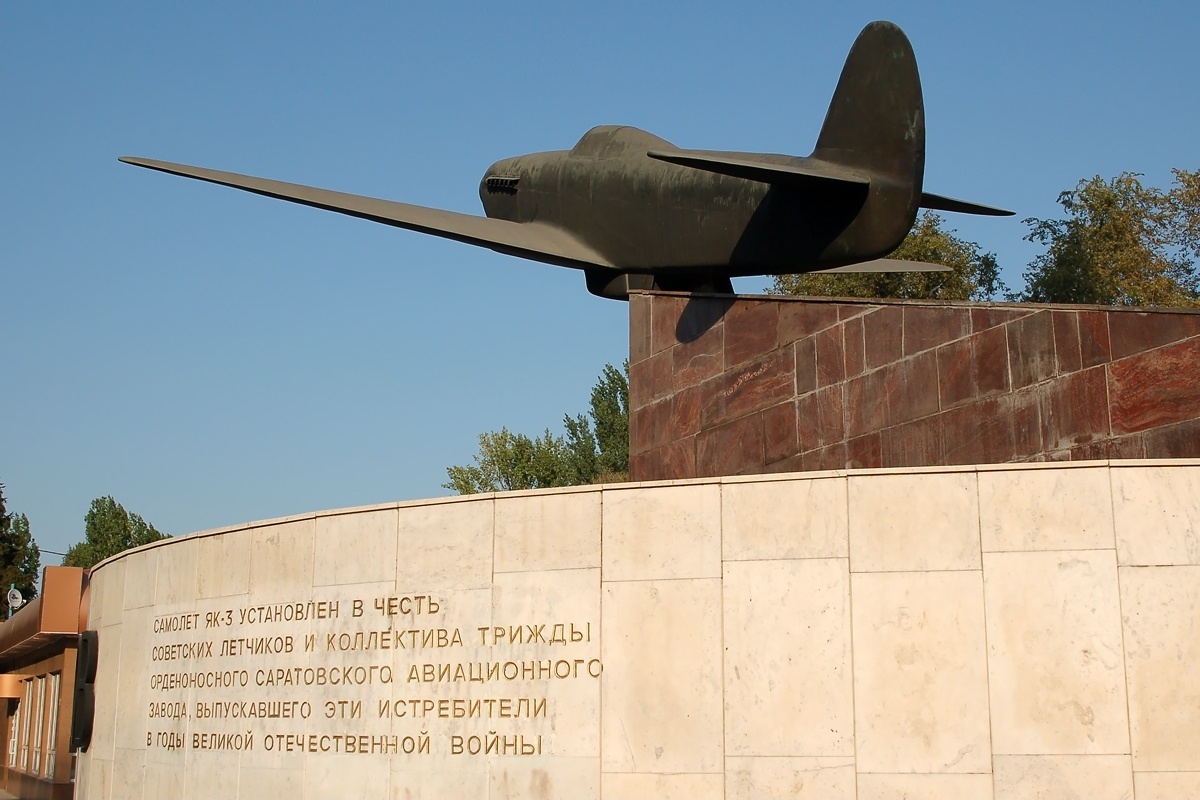
Як-3, Саратов - Южный (САЗ)

Aviation Plant №292 of MAP (Ministry of Aviation Industry of the USSR), former plant of combine harvesters, aircraft production since 1925, converted to "aviation" in 1937. The plant had 15,000 employees in 1992. The company was declared bankrupt in February 2011.

== History ==
In 1929 the V Congress of Soviets of the Soviet Union decided to build a factory for the production of agricultural machinery in Saratov. On July 8, 1929, the Selmash Trust established in Saratov a bureau for the construction of a factory for complex threshing machines and grain cleaning machines. In the autumn of 1929, construction organizations were created — the Selmash construction bureau, the industrial construction bureau and the construction works office. The site for the construction of the plant was chosen on the outskirts of the city near the Volga River.

The first object on the construction site was a house on a residential site. Barracks were built nearby, where a canteen, a construction office, a working dormitory, and a store were located.

In May 1930, it was decided to convert the agricultural machinery plant under construction in Saratov to combine harvesters.

On December 16, 1930, the Presidium of the Supreme Economic Council of the USSR considered the construction of the Saratov Combine Harvester Plant and decided to speed up its construction in every possible way. The completion date was set for January 1, 1932.

Simultaneously with the construction, training of workers and engineers was carried out, the development of a combine harvester, which later received the trademark "SZK".

On November 13, 1931, the first director of the Saratov Combine Harvester Plant, Mikhail Lvovich Vitchinkin, arrived and took up his duties.

Assembly of the conveyors was the last stage of work before the start of the plant. December 31, 1931, is considered the official date of birth of the Saratov Combine Harvester Plant named after Comrade Sheboldaev.

The construction was completed, mass production of agricultural machinery began, the main product was the SZK combine harvester. The plant has been increasing the production of combines from year to year. During the first six years of hard work, the plant's staff made a great contribution to the development of agricultural production in the Volga region, Siberia and the Far East, producing more than 39,000 units of grain harvesting equipment.

== Production ==
- R-10/KhAI-5, 1938..1940, 135.
- Yak trainers
- Yak-1, 1128 units in 1944.
- Yak-3, 1944 (1682 units)
- Yak-18T
- Yak-25
- Yak-27
- Yak-38
- Yak-40
- Yak-42
- Yak-54
- La-11
- La-15
- MiG-15
- EKIP Tarielka (Ekologiya i Progres or Ecology & Progress, an experimental saucer-shaped craft)

== Awards ==
- 1942 - Order of Lenin
- 1945 - Order of the Red Banner of Labour
- 1982 - Order of the October Revolution

== See also ==
- Saratov South Air Base
