= Saturn AL-34 =

Unbuilt aircraft engine

The Saturn/Lyulka AL-34 was an unbuilt turboshaft/turboprop engine for rotary and fixed-wing aircraft, proposed by the Soviet Union in the early 1990s. In turboprop form, the engine was offered for light aircraft such as the Sukhoi Su-86 eight-passenger business airplane, the Myasishchev M-101T Gzhel business jet, the ROS-Aeroprogress T-101 Grach nine-passenger aircraft, its derivative T-108 Zolotoy Orel nineteen-passenger aircraft, and the Krunichev T-511 "AIST-M". As a turboshaft, the AL-34 was proposed to power the Mil Mi-54 and the Kazan Ansat helicopters. The engine was also considered for unconventional aircraft such as the Mil Mi-30L Vintoplan tiltrotor aircraft, and it was to be an auxiliary engine for powering the boundary layer control system and air cushion on the EKIP flying saucer (a flying wing aircraft).

The AL-34 was one of the few engines to use a recuperator to recover and reuse waste heat from combustion.

The engine came in two versions. The AL-34-1 was an engine that produced 550 horsepower (410 kW) in cruise conditions. It weighed 363 pounds (165 kilograms), which included a compact, 88 lb (40 kg) recuperator. The AL-34-2 was a twin-configuration engine producing 1,100 hp (820 kW), weighing about 1,200 lb (540 kg), and using a common gearbox in a single module.

In October 2000, Saturn/Lyulka confirmed that it was still developing the AL-34 engine in the 1,000 to 1,500 hp (750 to 1,120 kW) power range, and it was working with Kawasaki on stationary powerplant applications. The AL-34 would cost 200-240 thousand dollars, and it would require about 22 million dollars to complete development. As late as January 2004, the engine was still being proposed for the T-511 "AIST-M" derivative of the Krunichev T-411 Aist light utility aircraft. However, the AL-34 never entered production.

== Specifications ==
Data from (for AL-34-1 only)

==== General characteristics ====
- Type: turboshaft or turboprop with recuperator
- Length: 1.609 m (5.28 ft; 1,609 mm; 63.3 in)
- Diameter: 0.676 m (2.22 ft; 676 mm; 26.6 in)
- Dry weight: 165 kg (363 lb)

==== Components ====
- Compressor:
- Fuel type: TS-1, T-1, RT, 25%
- Oil system: MK-32 (MS-20), 75%; MK-8P (MS-8P)

==== Performance ====
- Maximum power output: Takeoff: 1,000 hp (750 kW); Cruise: 550 hp (410 kW)
- Bypass ratio: 6.15
- Specific fuel consumption: Cruise: 0.348 lb/(hp⋅h) (0.158 kg/(hp⋅h); 0.212 kg/kWh)
