= Saratov South Air Base =

Former airport in Saratov, Russia

Saratov South
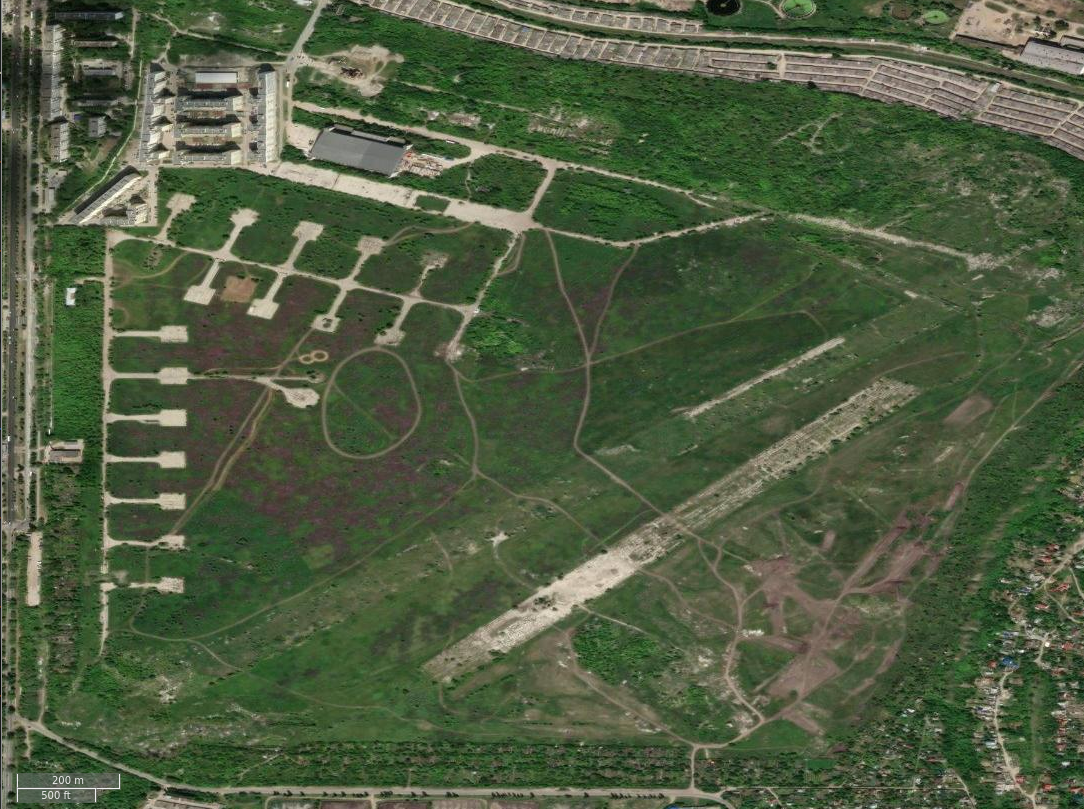
- Satellite imagery of former Saratov South air base

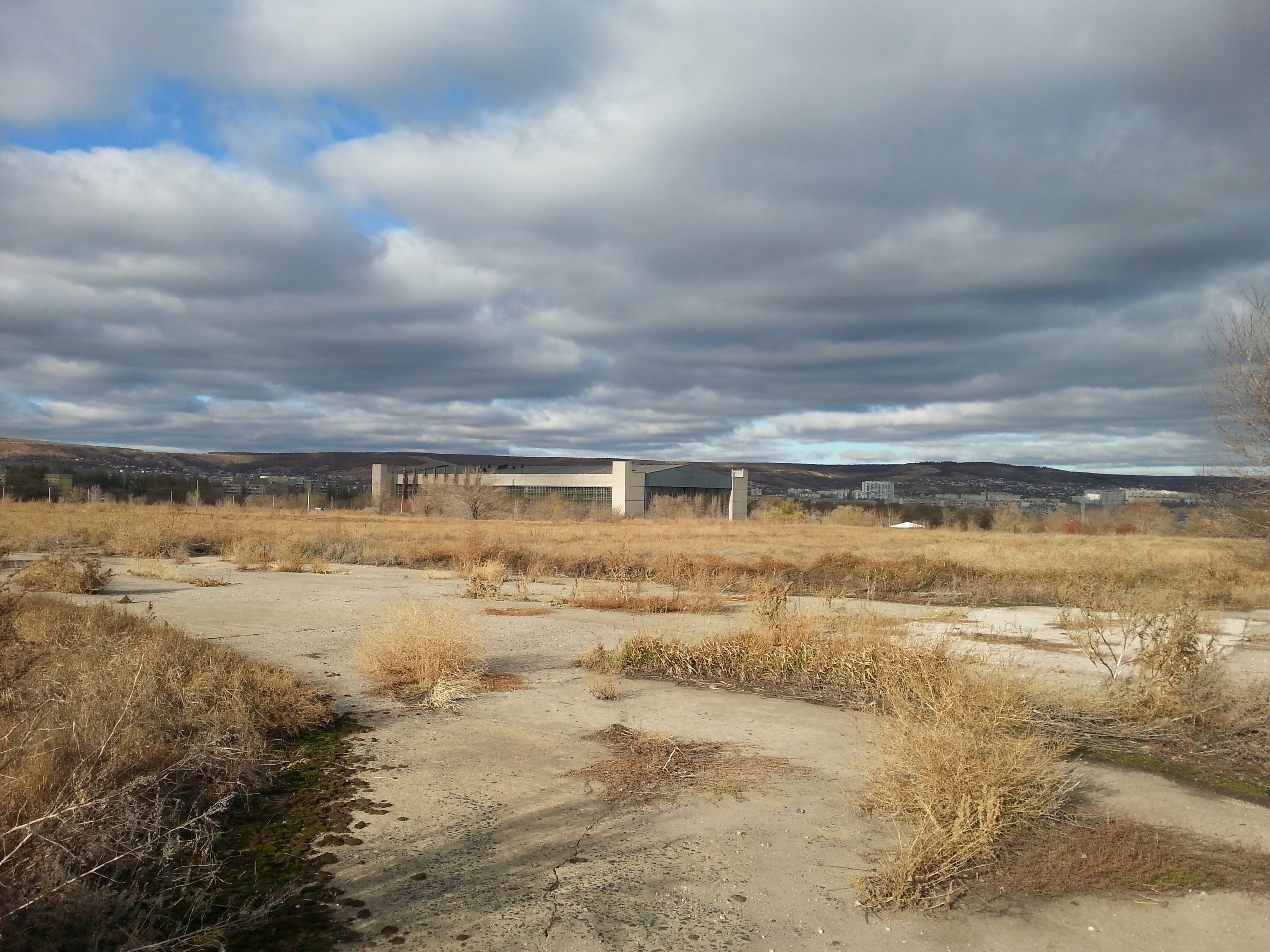
- Saratov South in 2015
- IATA: none; ICAO: XWSR

Summary
- Airport type: Military
- Location: Saratov
- Elevation AMSL: 266 ft / 81 m
- Coordinates: 51°28′50″N 45°56′20″E
- Interactive map of Saratov South

Runways
Direction	Length		Surface
Direction	ft	m	Surface
~~04/22~~	~~5,659~~	~~1,725~~	~~Concrete~~

Saratov South was a former air base in Russia located 8 km southwest of Saratov. It may have had military use during the Cold War with 17 parking stands and tarmac space. It later served as a Yakovlev factory airfield.

Google Earth high-resolution imagery from the 2004-2005 time-frame showed one Yak-42 and a couple of general aviation propeller planes, indicating the airfield remained operational. However, imagery from late-2017 showed the runway and stands being de-constructed and multi-storied buildings under construction near the former apron areas.

== See also ==
- List of Soviet Air Force bases
- Saratov Aviation Plant
