= IL-18 =

IL-18, IL 18 or IL18 may refer to:

- Interleukin 18, a protein encoded in humans by the IL18 gene
- Ilyushin Il-18 (1957), a Cold War–era Soviet turboprop airliner and military transport
- Ilyushin Il-18 (1946), a prototype Soviet radial-engined airliner
- Illinois's 18th congressional district, a defunct U.S. House district
- Illinois Route 18, a rural east–west state road in central Illinois, U.S.
