= EKIP =

Hybrid aircraft

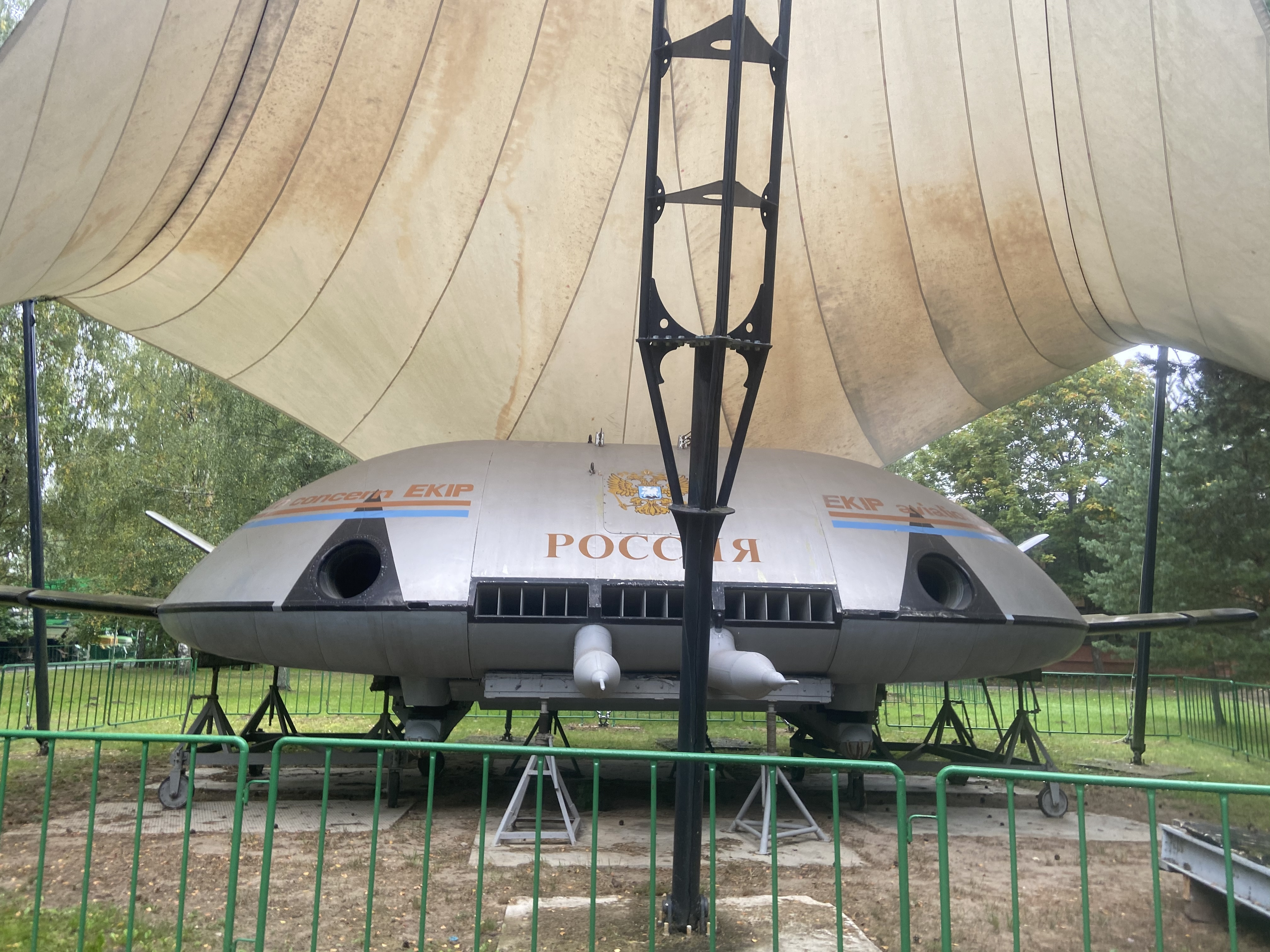
- The EKIP "flying saucer" lifting body aircraft, model L2-3.

General information
- Type: Flying wing
- National origin: Soviet Union / Russia
- Manufacturer: Saratov Aviation Plant
- Designer: Lev Nikolayevich Schukin / EKIP Aviation Concern

History
- Introduction date: 1978
- Developed from: Buran space shuttle

EKIP (translated from ЭКИП, the Russian acronym for "Экология и Прогресс", which means "Ecology and Progress") is the Soviet and Russian project of a multifunctional aerodrome-free aircraft, built according to the "flying wing" scheme, with an elliptically shaped fuselage. Also known by its Russian nickname of Tarielka (Тарелка, meaning "plate" or "saucer"), the EKIP can land on water or unpaved ground through the use of an air cushion instead of a wheeled undercarriage. The EKIP is a short takeoff and landing (STOL) aircraft.

A special feature of the design is the presence of a special system of stabilization and reduction of drag, made in the form of a vortex control system of the boundary layer flowing around the stern surface of the device, as well as an additional flat-bed reactive system for controlling the device at low speeds and in takeoff and landing modes.

The need for a stabilization system and reduction of drag is due to the fact that the body of the apparatus, made in the form of a thick wing of small elongation, on the one hand, has a high aerodynamic quality and is able to create lifting force several times higher than a thin wing, on the other hand, it has low stability due to the disruption of flows and the formation of zones of turbulence. The use of the "bearing wing" scheme provides a useful internal volume several times larger than that of promising aircraft of equal payload. Such a body increases the comfort and safety of flights, significantly saves fuel and reduces operating costs.

== Development ==
The EKIP concept was developed by Professor Lev Nikolayevich Schukin (Russian: Лев Николаевич Щукин), an engineer trained in aircraft engine development who also worked for the NPO Energia rocket design corporation and participated in the Soviet portion of the Apollo–Soyuz Test Project in 1975, the first US-Soviet space linkup. In 1978, the EKIP concept was first proposed to Soviet military authorities, and in 1979, Schukin founded the EKIP NPP (scientific-production enterprise), which was based in Podlipki (Korolev). In 1980, the EKIP project initiated laboratory studies and engineering work. The first bench test on a small-scale model was conducted in 1982 at the top-secret Geodesia research institute in Krasnoarmeysk, Moscow Oblast. Major work on the still top-secret project began in 1987, and flight tests of the first scale model began in 1990–1991. This first radio-controlled flown aircraft was called the L-1 model, and it had a T-tail empennage. Initially the flights took place at the Sokol Aircraft Plant, which was known for producing MiG fighter aircraft. After radio-control problems caused the scale model to crash during a flight in snowy conditions, the Nizhny Novgorod manufacturing plant banned further EKIP test flights. Scale model testing was then moved in April 1990 to the Saratov Aviation Plant, where Yakovlev aircraft were manufactured. In 1992, another small, unmanned model crashed from a height of 40 m (130 ft), but it later flew successfully after repairs and ballast adjustment. That year, the EKIP Aviation Concern (EKIP AK) was founded by the EKIP NPP, Saratov Aviation Plant, and the Triumf NPP.

The concept made its public debut in 1992 at the Mosaeroshou (the predecessor to the MAKS air show), and it appeared at other exhibitions over the next two years, including the 1993 Paris Air Show. At the MAKS air show in September 1993, Schukin described three versions being developed: an 8-metric-ton (18,000 lb), single-deck, 20-seat model; a 35-metric-ton (77,000 lb) model using Ivchenko Progress engines from Ukraine and a Saturn engine to generate the air cushion; and a 120-metric-ton (260,000 lb), triple-deck model containing two passenger decks and one freight deck. Two 2.7 m (8.9 ft) span, L-2 models were successfully flown by remote control in the middle of that year.

In 1994, reports about the EKIP began to appear in Western media, and the L3 model (which could carry 400 passengers or 40 tonnes of cargo) had earned provisional orders for 1,500 aircraft from the North Siberian Development Board, a Russian food distribution agency. At this time, the Saratov Aviation Plant was building an unmanned, 15 m (49 ft) span L2-3 model for flight testing. The all-metal L2-3 model would be powered by two Saturn/Lyulka AL-34 engines, which generate an air cushion for takeoff and landing and power the boundary layer control system. The AL-34 turboshaft engines, which were designed for light aircraft and rotorcraft, were placed centrally inside the hull. Saratov had also finished the preliminary design of the 120 t (260,000 lb) variant, which would have a span of 56 m (184 ft). In addition to its two AL-34 engines, this larger variant would include a pair of Kuznetsov NK-92 ducted propfan engines to provide 18,000 kgf (40,000 lbf; 177 kN) of forward thrust. Even bigger variants of up to 128 m (420 ft) in span and 600 t (1,300,000 lb) in weight may use the 23,000 kgf (52,000 lbf; 230 kN), Progress D-18T turbofan for forward thrust instead of the NK-92, with the AL-34 engines still remaining for auxiliary purposes. Five commercial cargo/passenger variants were described at this time: the L2-3, L3-1, L3-2, L4-1, and L4-2, which had seating capacities covering 24 to 2,000 passengers, flying ranges of 1,300–4,600 nmi (2,500–8,600 km; 1,600–5,300 mi), and maximum takeoff weights (MTOWs) of 9–600 t (20,000–1,323,000 lb).

By February 1995, ground tests were conducted on the 9 t (20,000 lb) test aircraft, with plant tests to be completed in June and unmanned test flights scheduled to begin in October. A second 9 t (20,000 lb) test aircraft was to be assembled in Saratov by the end of the year, with manned flights to be attempted in 1996.

Following the breakup of the Soviet Union, the Russian government granted the EKIP project 1.2 billion rubles of funding in June 1993. However, by the time the money was received, hyperinflation had eroded its purchasing power by a factor of eight. Construction of two full-size EKIP vehicles with a total take-off weight of 9 t (20,000 lb) had begun. The hulls and control surfaces were built at Energia in Korolev, and final assembly was performed at Saratov. In 1997, Russia planned to invest CAD$12 million into the EKIP project, with the a new round of flight tests slated for 1999. It was supported at the state level Ministry of Defense Industry, Ministry of Defense (lead customer) and Ministry of Forestry. In 1999, the development of the EKIP apparatus in Korolev was included as a separate line in the country's budget, but funding was interrupted and no money was received. Due to the lack of funds, the project was shelved in June of that year. The creator of EKIP, Lev Schukin, was worried about the fate of the project and, after numerous attempts to continue the project with personal funds, he died of a heart attack in 2001.

In September 2003, the Saratov Aviation Plant signed an agreement to work with the United States Naval Air Systems Command (NAVAIR) to develop the EKIP. The flight test program was to be conducted in Maryland at Naval Air Station Patuxent River's Webster Field within three to five years. By this time, the EKIP L2-3 test model had evolved into a 12 t (26,000 lb) craft capable of carrying a 4 t (8,800 lb) payload, and it had a wingspan of about 18 m (60 ft) and a fuselage length of approximately 12 m (40 ft). Also planned was a larger L3-2 model, which would have a maximum takeoff weight (MTOW) of 360 t (790,000 lb), a payload capability of 120 t (260,000 lb), a wingspan over 91 m (300 ft), and a fuselage length of almost 61 m (200 ft).

The binational agreement was followed by a formal contract in April 2004. NAVAIR and Saratov would jointly produce the EKIP, which would be targeted for use in extinguishing forest fires. The United States would pay dividends to Russia after the sales and production of the EKIP started. Saratov would construct the initial flight test prototype, which would weigh 230 kg (500 lb) and be delivered to NAVAIR as early as 2006 for testing. However, by July 2005, NAVAIR said that it no longer planned to pursue EKIP development.

From 2005 through 2009, a consortium of ten European and Russian research groups from universities and industrial enterprises conducted European Union-funded studies on the currents created by the wing, similar to the EKIP fairing. The working title of the project was VortexCell2050 (transl. Vortex Cell 2050). The EKIP aircraft was also presented at air shows through at least 2010. By this time, the cargo/passenger variants had been reduced to three versions (the L2-3, L3-1, and L3-2), which now had capacities of 40 to 1,200 passengers and MTOWs of 12–360 t (26,000–794,000 lb), while the longest-range version now had a reduced range of 3,200 nmi (6,000 km; 3,700 mi). Also, the PW206 turboshaft and PW305A turbofan engines from Pratt & Whitney Canada and the Progress D-18T had replaced the Saturn/Lyulka AL-34 and Kuznetsov NK-92 in the EKIP offerings, as those two engines never reached the production stage. After the closure of the Saratov Aviation Plant, the EKIP prototype was transferred to a museum in Ivanovskoye village, near Moscow. The prototype has been on public display since 2011.

== Design ==
The unusual shape of the EKIP aircraft has been described as resembling a poached egg, beetle, cheese bell, or overturned bowl. It is designed to offer greater volume for passengers, cargo, and fuel compared to typical airliners. The flying wing fuselage has a center section and side sections. The cockpit, passenger cabin, and cargo storage are located in the center section. The fuel tanks, fuel feed systems, engines, and fire extinguishing equipment are in the side sections. Below each fuselage side section is an air-cushion skeg, which extends longitudinally in a straight line from in front of the fuselage's leading edge to behind the trailing edge. The air cushions are used in place of retractable, wheeled landing gear for takeoffs and landings, which can occur on water or unpaved surfaces as short as 500 m (1,600 ft). In preparation for an aircraft landing, the air cushions are inflated and expanded, and then they are deflated and folded inside the aircraft. Passenger versions of the EKIP would have large, dimmable, load-bearing windows, and the cabin noise level would be targeted for a maximum of 75 decibels (dB).

To reduce aerodynamic resistance, a boundary layer control (BLC) system is used, which ensures a continuous, separation-free airflow around the aircraft by using a set of consecutive transverse vortices on the back surface of the EKIP. The system is made of parallel pairs of slots. The front slot of the pair ejects air out of the vehicle, while the back slot of the pair sucks air back in. Due to this, the machine moves in a laminar aerodynamic flow with less resistance. The system allows low energy consumption to provide low aerodynamic resistance and stability of the device for angle of attack up to 40° (in cruise, takeoff and landing). To improve the flying wing's lifting force and drag coefficient by a factor of 1.5 to 2, the BLC system needs the equivalent of only 3–6% of the rated power of the forward thrust engines. Taking advantage of the BLC system gives the EKIP aircraft a high thickness-to-chord ratio of 30–35%, compared to 8–10% for the wing of a conventional airliner.

To fix the stability issues associated with flying saucers, the EKIP implemented automated control technology from the Soviet Union's Buran space shuttle, which in 1988 became the first space orbiter to make an automated landing back on Earth. It uses directable air flow to provide stability and flight control. In addition to flaps, the EKIP's stubby wings have reaction control thrusters at their tips, which stabilize the aircraft at lower speeds than possible on conventional, cruciform-shaped aircraft. The tail has nozzles for horizontal and vertical thrust vectoring, which limits any undesirable yaw and roll of the aircraft.

The EKIP can fly at altitudes up to 12,800 m (42,000 ft) at speeds up to 380 kn (700 km/h; 430 mph), although there were future plans for a model that could fly at 510–540 kn (950–1,000 km/h; 590–620 mph). The aircraft can land at speeds as low as 51–54 kn (95–100 km/h; 59–62 mph), compared to 135–140 kn (250–260 km/h; 155–162 mph) for conventional airliners. The EKIP is capable of takeoffs and landings on water; the 45 t (99,000 lb) L3-1 model can depart or arrive in 1.2–1.3 m (3.9–4.3 ft) waves. At a cruising height of 8,500 to 11,000 m (27,900 to 36,100 ft), the aircraft has a lift-to-drag ratio of 17–18. When the EKIP flies in ground effect at 2.4 m (8 ft) above the ground or water, the lift-to-drag ratio increases to 25.

=== Power plant ===
An EKIP aircraft uses two sets of engines. The first set is used to provide forward thrust. The second set pulls the air over the aircraft to add to the EKIP's velocity and reduce aerodynamic drag through boundary layer control. The latter set, which are referred to as auxiliary turboshaft engines, are run economically during cruise, but they work at maximum power during takeoff and landing to create an air cushion. Both types of engines are placed inside of the rear hull.

The dual-generator AL-34 engine can be powered using jet fuel (kerosene-based) or cryogenic fuels such as hydrogen and natural gas. It is also designed to work with aquazine, a Russian alternative fuel in development that is made with a water emulsifier. Aquazine consists of up to 58% water emulsified in hydrocarbons, such as low-grade gasoline or processed products of natural gas or associated gas. The emulsified fuel is claimed to have a total octane number of 85, even though it is made from gasoline waste products having an octane number of 50. Although aquazine has a freezing point of −28 °C (−18 °F), storage of the fuel within the EKIP's temperature-controlled hull prevents aquazine from solidifying, unlike with fuel stored in a standard airliner wing. The EKIP designers also investigated a water injection-like system in which conventional jet fuel was burned, but the water condensate from the exhaust gas was collected and added to the fuel mix.

If the forward thrust engines become disabled, the EKIP can make a trouble-free landing on unprepared ground sites or on the water, even on only one auxiliary engine. The descent rate is claimed to peak at only 3 m/s (9.8 ft/s; 11 km/h; 6.7 mph).

== Variants ==
=== Civilian ===
- Unmanned Aerial Vehicle: EKIP-AULA L2-3, EKIP-2;
- For passenger traffic (2 or more people);
- For transportation;
- Patrol service for catastrophe monitoring and forest fire detection: EKIP-2P.

=== Military ===
- Amphibious assault vehicle (in anti-submarine, patrol, amphibious assault variants).
- Fighting vehicle.

The range of weapons that can be installed on EKIP, great due to the large carrying capacity and high maneuverability of the device.

== Specifications ==
Aircraft characteristics
Year	1994–1995					2010		
Model	EKIP L2-3	EKIP L3-1	EKIP L3-2	EKIP L4-1	EKIP L4-2	EKIP L2-3	EKIP L3-1	EKIP L3-2
Passengers	24	80	300	1,000	2,000	40	160	1,200
Length	11 m (36 ft)	20 m (66 ft)	35.6 m (117 ft)	59 m (194 ft)	82 m (269 ft)	11.33 m (37.2 ft)	22 m (72 ft)	62 m (203 ft)
Span	14.4 m (47 ft)	31.3 m (103 ft)	55.5 m (182 ft)	91.6 m (301 ft)	128 m (420 ft)	18.64 m (61.2 ft)	36.2 m (119 ft)	102 m (335 ft)
Height	2.5 m (8 ft 2 in)	5.5 m (18 ft)	11.8 m (39 ft)	19.6 m (64 ft)	27.5 m (90 ft)	3.73 m (12.2 ft)	7.25 m (23.8 ft)	20.4 m (67 ft)
Plan area	88 m^{2} (950 sq ft)	400 m^{2} (4,300 sq ft)	1,250 m^{2} (13,500 sq ft)	3,430 m^{2} (36,900 sq ft)	6,860 m^{2} (73,800 sq ft)	N/A	N/A	N/A
Air cushion surface contact area	23.8 m^{2} (256 sq ft)	75 m^{2} (810 sq ft)	235 m^{2} (2,530 sq ft)	640 m^{2} (6,900 sq ft)	1,280 m^{2} (13,800 sq ft)	45.6 m^{2} (491 sq ft)	170 m^{2} (1,800 sq ft)	1,368 m^{2} (14,730 sq ft)
Maximum takeoff weight (MTOW)	9 t (20,000 lb)	40 t (88,000 lb)	120 t (260,000 lb)	300 t (660,000 lb)	600 t (1,300,000 lb)	12 t (26,000 lb)	45 t (99,000 lb)	360 t (790,000 lb)
Operating empty weight (OEW)	5 t (11,000 lb)	15 t (33,000 lb)	40 t (88,000 lb)	100 t (220,000 lb)	200 t (440,000 lb)	N/A	N/A	N/A
Cargo weight	2.5 t (5,500 lb)	10 t (22,000 lb)	35 t (77,000 lb)	100 t (220,000 lb)	200 t (440,000 lb)	4.0 t (8,800 lb)	16 t (35,000 lb)	120 t (260,000 lb)
Fuel weight	1.5 t (3,300 lb)	10 t (22,000 lb)	40 t (88,000 lb)	100 t (220,000 lb)	200 t (440,000 lb)	2.7 t (6,000 lb)	14.0 t (30,900 lb)	127.2 t (280,000 lb)
Cruise speed	350 kn (650 km/h; 400 mph)					380 kn (700 km/h; 430 mph)		
Cruise altitude	5,500–6,000 m (18,000–20,000 ft)	8,500–10,000 m (28,000–33,000 ft)				8,000–11,500 m (26,200–37,700 ft)		
Range	1,300 nmi (2,500 km; 1,600 mi)	2,400 nmi (4,500 km; 2,800 mi)	4,000 nmi (7,500 km; 4,700 mi)	4,600 nmi (8,600 km; 5,300 mi)		1,300 nmi (2,500 km; 1,600 mi)	2,200 nmi (4,000 km; 2,500 mi)	3,200 nmi (6,000 km; 3,700 mi)
Engine type	4 Saturn/Lyulka AL-34 @0.85 tf (1,900 lbf; 8.3 kN)	2 Progress D-436 @7 tf (15,000 lbf; 69 kN)	2 Kuznetsov NK-92 @18 tf (40,000 lbf; 180 kN)	6 Kuznetsov NK-92 @18 tf (40,000 lbf; 180 kN)	10 Kuznetsov NK-92 @18 tf (40,000 lbf; 180 kN)	1 P&W Canada PW206 + 2 P&W Canada PW305A @2.35 tf (5,200 lbf; 23.0 kN)	2 P&W Canada PW206 + 2 Progress D-436 @9.0 tf (20,000 lbf; 88 kN)	6 P&W Canada PW206 + 6 Progress D-18T @25 tf (55,000 lbf; 250 kN)
Fuel consumption per available seat kilometer in cruise	14 g/km (0.79 oz/mi) per available seat	11 g/km (0.62 oz/mi) per available seat	10–11 g/km (0.57–0.62 oz/mi) per available seat			15 g/km (0.85 oz/mi) per available seat		
Runway type	ground or water					ground or water		
Wing loading	102 kg/m^{2} (1.00 kPa; 21 lb/sq ft; 0.0099 atm)	88 kg/m^{2} (0.86 kPa; 18 lb/sq ft; 0.0085 atm)				<125 kg/m^{2} (1.23 kPa; 26 lb/sq ft; 0.0121 atm)		
Flotation (support surface) pressure	380 kg/m^{2} (3.7 kPa; 78 lb/sq ft; 0.037 atm)	500 kg/m^{2} (4.9 kPa; 100 lb/sq ft; 0.048 atm)				<265 kg/m^{2} (2.60 kPa; 54 lb/sq ft; 0.0256 atm)		
Takeoff run	400 m (1,300 ft)	450 m (1,480 ft)	500 m (1,600 ft)			≤450 m (1,480 ft)	≤475 m (1,558 ft)	≤600 m (2,000 ft)

== See also ==
- Aeroscraft
- Boeing Pelican
- Thermoplan
