= Ilyushin Il-102 =

Ground-attack aircraft

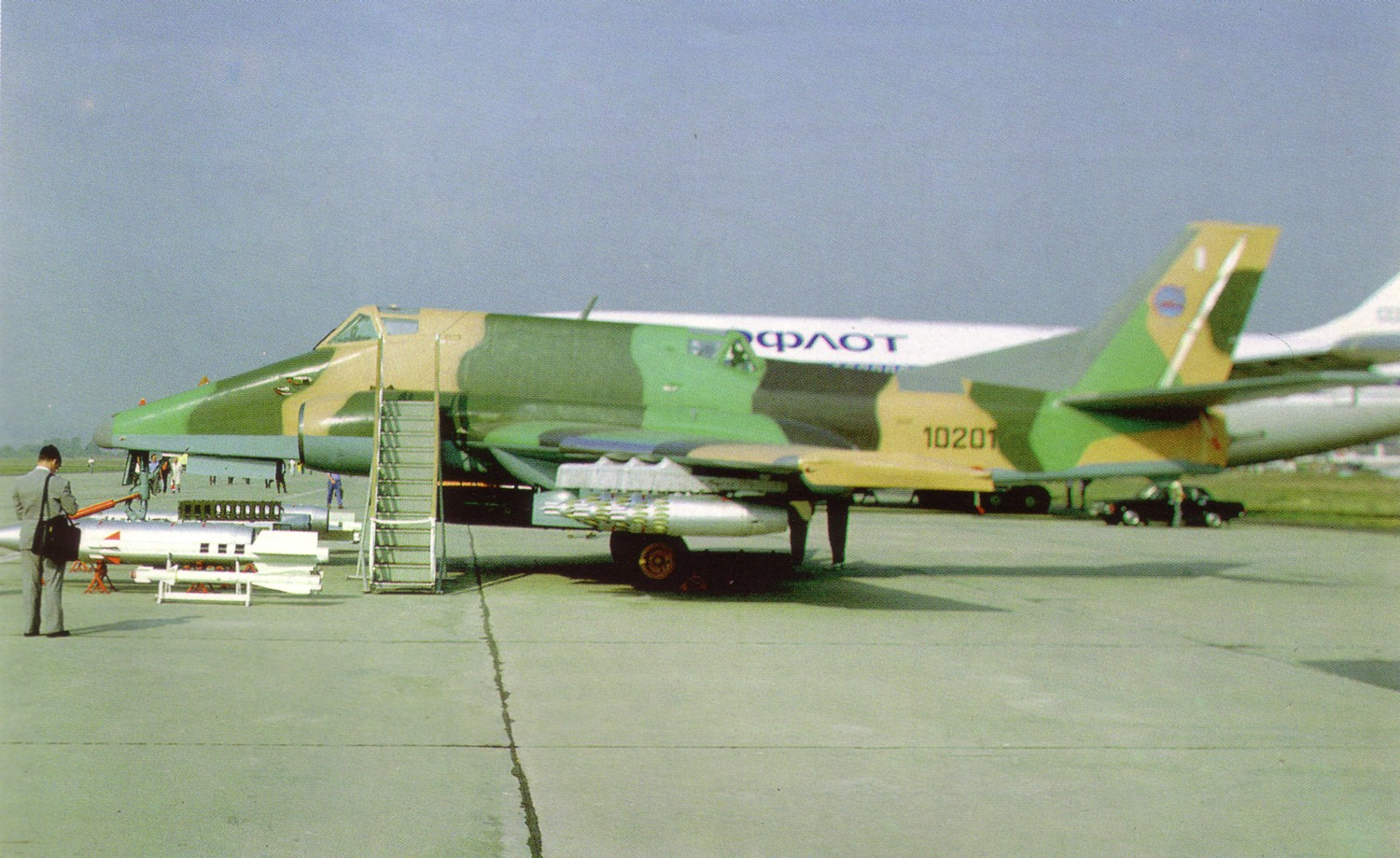
- Ilyushin Il-102 on display

General information
- Type: Ground-attack aircraft
- Manufacturer: Ilyushin
- Status: Prototype
- Number built: 2

History
- First flight: 25 September 1982
- Developed from: Ilyushin Il-40

The Ilyushin Il-102 is a Soviet experimental jet-powered ground-attack aircraft designed by Ilyushin. This aircraft was never chosen for production, being surpassed by the Su-25. Only a few development prototypes were built.

== Design and development ==
In 1967, the Soviet Air Forces drew up a specification for a jet-powered shturmovik or armoured ground attack aircraft. While Sukhoi designed an all-new single seat aircraft, the Su-25, Ilyushin proposed a modified version of their Il-40 of 1953 under the designation Il-42, which, unlike the Sukhoi, was a two-seat aircraft with a remotely-controlled rear gun turret. The design was rejected by the Soviet Air Forces, but Ilyushin decided to continue in-house development regardless, renaming the programme Il-102.

The Il-102 first prototype flew on 25 September 1982, with a second airframe built for static tests, and carried out 250 test flights until it was grounded in 1984 when the engine life expired.

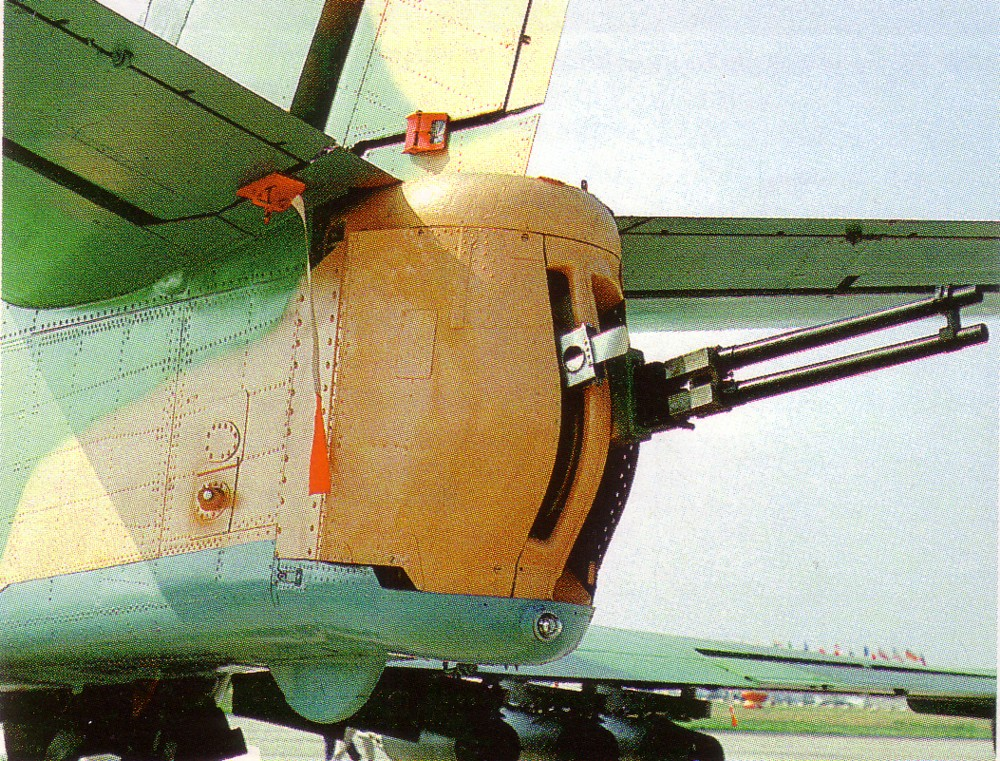
The tail turret of the Il-102, armed with a GSh-23L twin-barreled cannon

The Il-102 was a low-winged monoplane with moderately swept (30 degrees) wings, powered by two Klimov RD-33I turbofans (non-afterburning versions of the engines that power the Mikoyan MiG-29 fighter). It was highly unusual for its time in having a rear gun turret, something not seen in ground-attack aircraft since the World War II Il-2 Shturmovik and Il-10, the Il-102's spiritual ancestors, controlled remotely by a gunner sitting in a cockpit above the trailing edge of the wing. The crew cockpits, engines and fuel tanks were armoured to protect against ground fire.

Although development was abandoned in 1984, the prototype Il-102 was publicly unveiled at the 1992 Mosaeroshow air show at Zhukovsky, being claimed to be available for export.

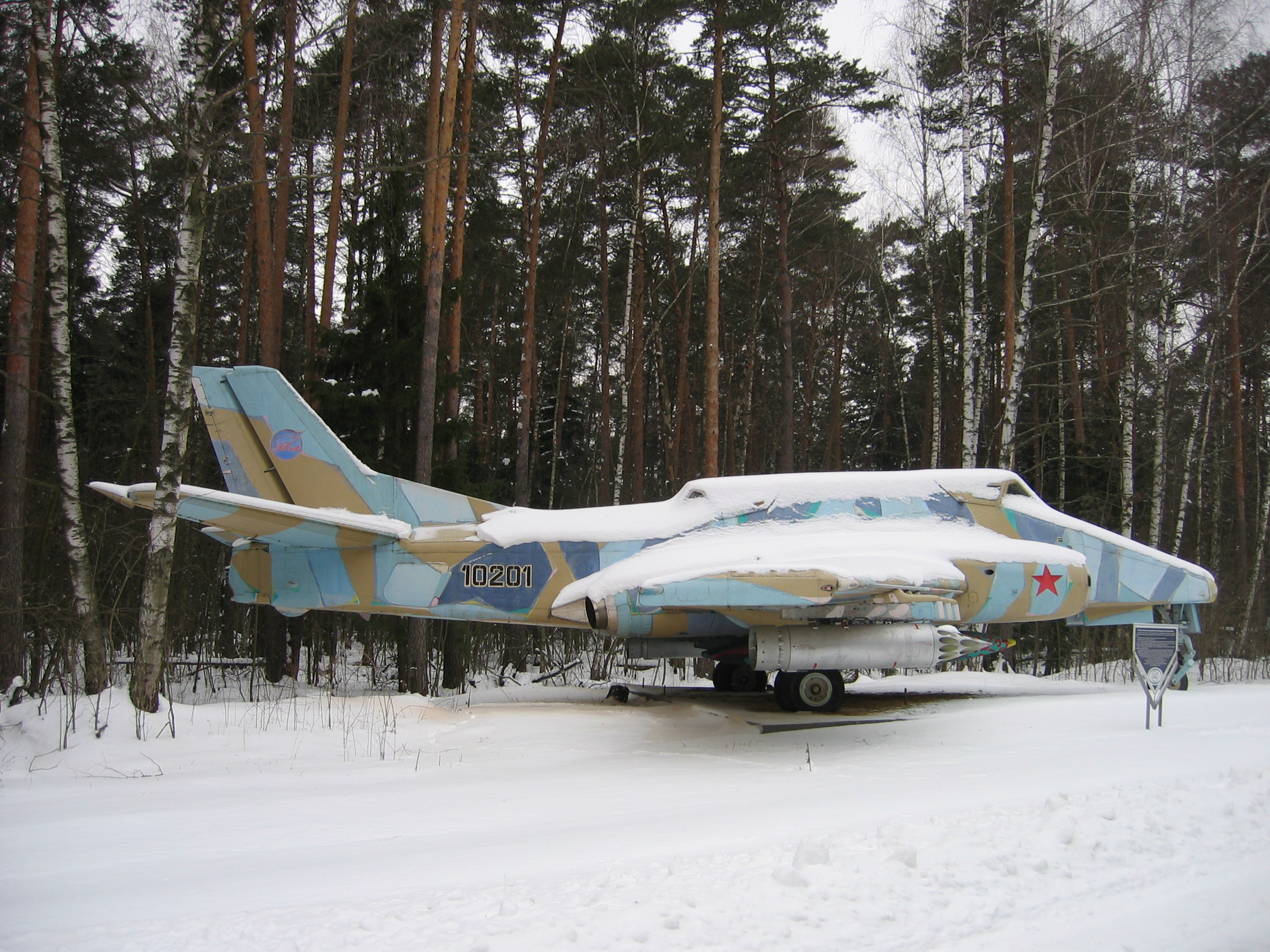
Ilyushin Il-102 on display at the Gromov Flight Research Institute

As of 2005, the prototype No. 10201 was placed on display at the Gromov Flight Research Institute.

== Specifications ==
Data from The Osprey Encyclopedia of Russian Aircraft 1875–1995

General characteristics

- Crew: 2
- Length: 17.5 m (57 ft 5 in)
- Wingspan: 16.9 m (55 ft 5 in)
- Height: 5.08 m (16 ft 8 in)
- Wing area: 63.5 m^{2} (684 sq ft)
- Empty weight: 13,000 kg (28,660 lb)
- Gross weight: 18,000 kg (39,683 lb)
- Max takeoff weight: 22,000 kg (48,502 lb)
- Powerplant: 2 × Klimov RD-33I turbofan engines, 51 kN (11,000 lbf) thrust each

Performance

- Maximum speed: 950 km/h (590 mph, 510 kn)
- Combat range: 400–500 km (250–310 mi, 220–270 nmi)
- Ferry range: 3,000 km (1,900 mi, 1,600 nmi)
- Wing loading: 283 kg/m^{2} (58 lb/sq ft)
- Thrust/weight: 0.58

Armament

- Guns:
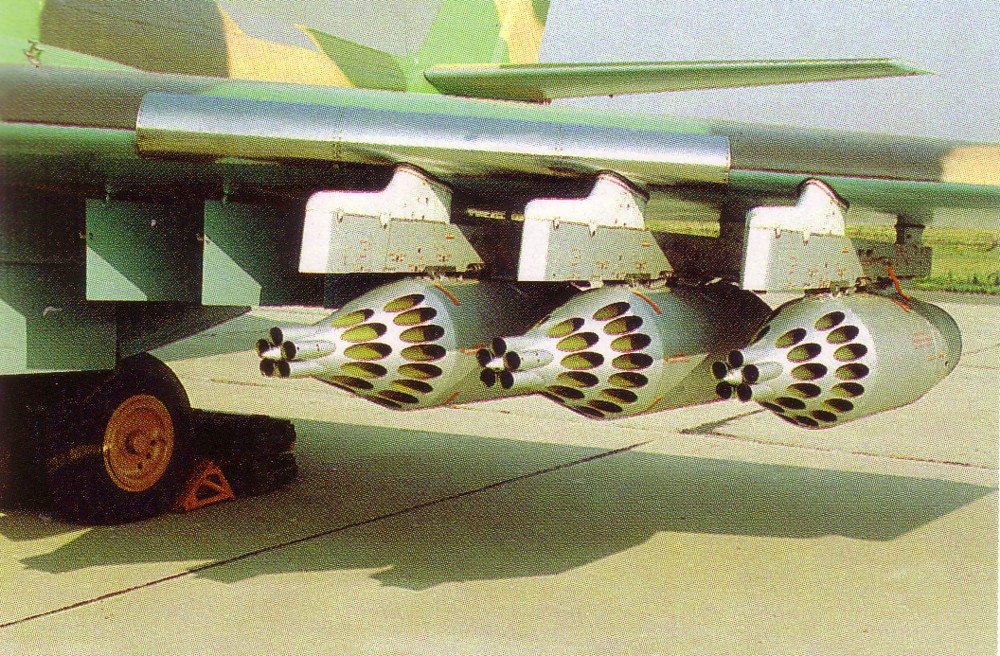
  The under-wing pylons of the Il-102, armed with unguided rocket pods
- 1 × 30mm GSh-30-2 cannon externally mounted under fuselage
- 1 × 23 mm GSh-23L cannon in remotely controlled tail turret
- Bombs: 7,200 kg (15,873 lb) external stores in six wing bomb bays and eight external pylons (six under wing and two under fuselage)
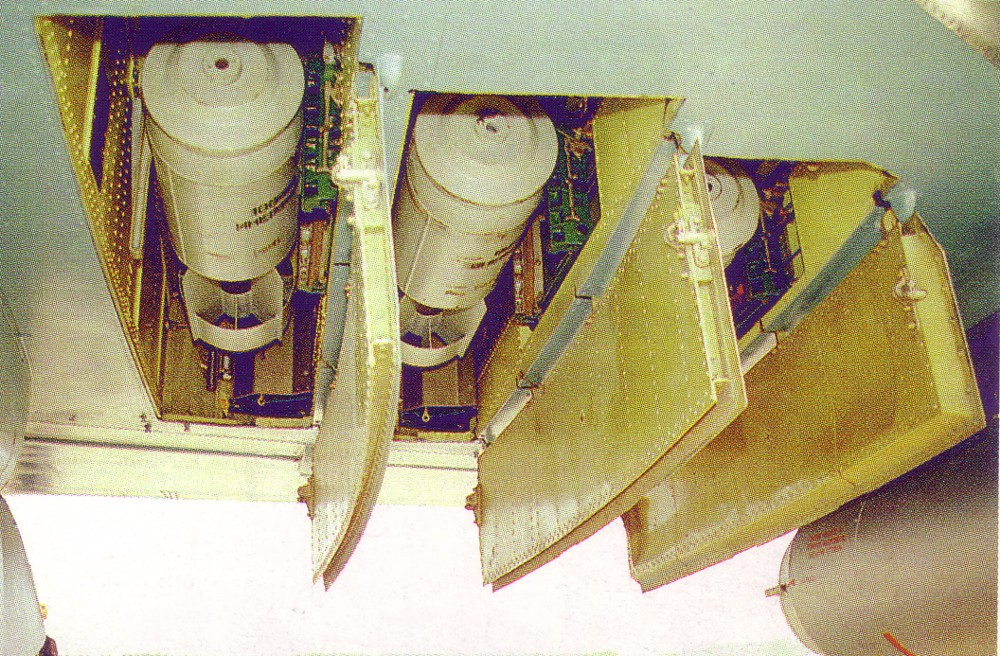
  The under-wing bomb-bays of the Il-102, armed with bombs

== See also ==
Related development

- Ilyushin Il-40

Aircraft of comparable role, configuration, and era

- Fairchild Republic A-10 Thunderbolt II – (United States)
- Northrop YA-9 – (United States)
- Sukhoi Su-25 – (Soviet Union, Russia, Georgia)
- Nanchang Q-6 – (China)
