= Ilyushin Il-26 =

1940s Soviet projected bomber

General information
- Type: Strategic bomber project
- National origin: USSR
- Manufacturer: Ilyushin

The Ilyushin Il-26 was a late 1940s project for a strategic heavy bomber by the Ilyushin Design Bureau. There were a variety of alternative engines proposed for the Il-26, including the 3,400 kW (4,500 hp) Shvetsov ASh-2TK piston engine and 4,500 kW (6,000 hp) Yakovlev M-501 diesel engine. The specifications varied according to the number and type of engines proposed.

== Specifications (Il-26 estimated) ==
Data from Unflown wings : Soviet and Russian unrealized aircraft projects 1925-2010.

General characteristics

- Crew: 12
- Length: 39 m (127 ft 11 in)
- Wingspan: 61 m (200 ft 2 in)
- Height: 13.7 m (44 ft 11 in)
- Wing area: 475 m^{2} (5,110 sq ft)
- Max takeoff weight: 190,000 kg (418,878 lb)
- Powerplant: 6 × Klimov VK-2 turboprop engines, 3,700 kW (5,000 shp) each

Performance

- Maximum speed: 545 km/h (339 mph, 294 kn) at sea level

560 km/h (350 mph) at 9,300 m (30,500 ft)

- Range: 11,560 km (7,180 mi, 6,240 nmi) with 5,000 kg (11,000 lb) load
- Service ceiling: 10,000 m (33,000 ft)

Armament

- Guns: 5 x paired 23 mm (0.906 in) cannon in twodorsal, 2 ventral and one tail remote controlled turrets
- Bombs: 12,000 kg (26,000 lb) of bombs (maximum)
