= Ilyushin Il-106 =

Heavy military transport airplane

General information
- Type: Heavy military transport
- National origin: Russia
- Manufacturer: Ilyushin
- Number built: None

History
- Developed into: Ilyushin PAK VTA

The Ilyushin Il-106 (Russian: Илью́шин Ил-106) was a proposed 1990s Russian heavy military transport to replace the Il-76. It would have been a four-engined high-wing cantilever monoplane with a large 34 m (111 ft 7 in) cabin.

In 2016 it was announced that the Il-106 airframe would be re-used for the PAK VTA project, a proposed large military transport aircraft for the Russian Air Force.

== Specifications ==
Data from

General characteristics

- Length: 57.6 m (189 ft 0 in)
- Wingspan: 58.5 m (191 ft 11 in)
- Height: 19.93 m (65 ft 5 in)
- Wing area: 370 m^{2} (4,000 sq ft)
- Empty weight: 135,000 kg (297,624 lb)
- Gross weight: 258,000 kg (568,792 lb)
- Useful lift: 80,000 kg (180,000 lb)
- Powerplant: 4 × Kuznetsov NK-92 or D-100 turbofans , 176.53 or 186 kN (39,690 or 41,810 lbf) thrust each

Performance

- Cruise speed: 850 km/h (528 mph, 459 kn)
- Range: 5,000 km (3,107 mi, 2,700 nmi)
- Service ceiling: 14,000 m (46,000 ft)

== See also ==
Aircraft of comparable role, configuration, and era

- C-17 Globemaster III
