= Ilyushin =

Russian aircraft manufacturer

PJSC Ilyushin Aviation Complex

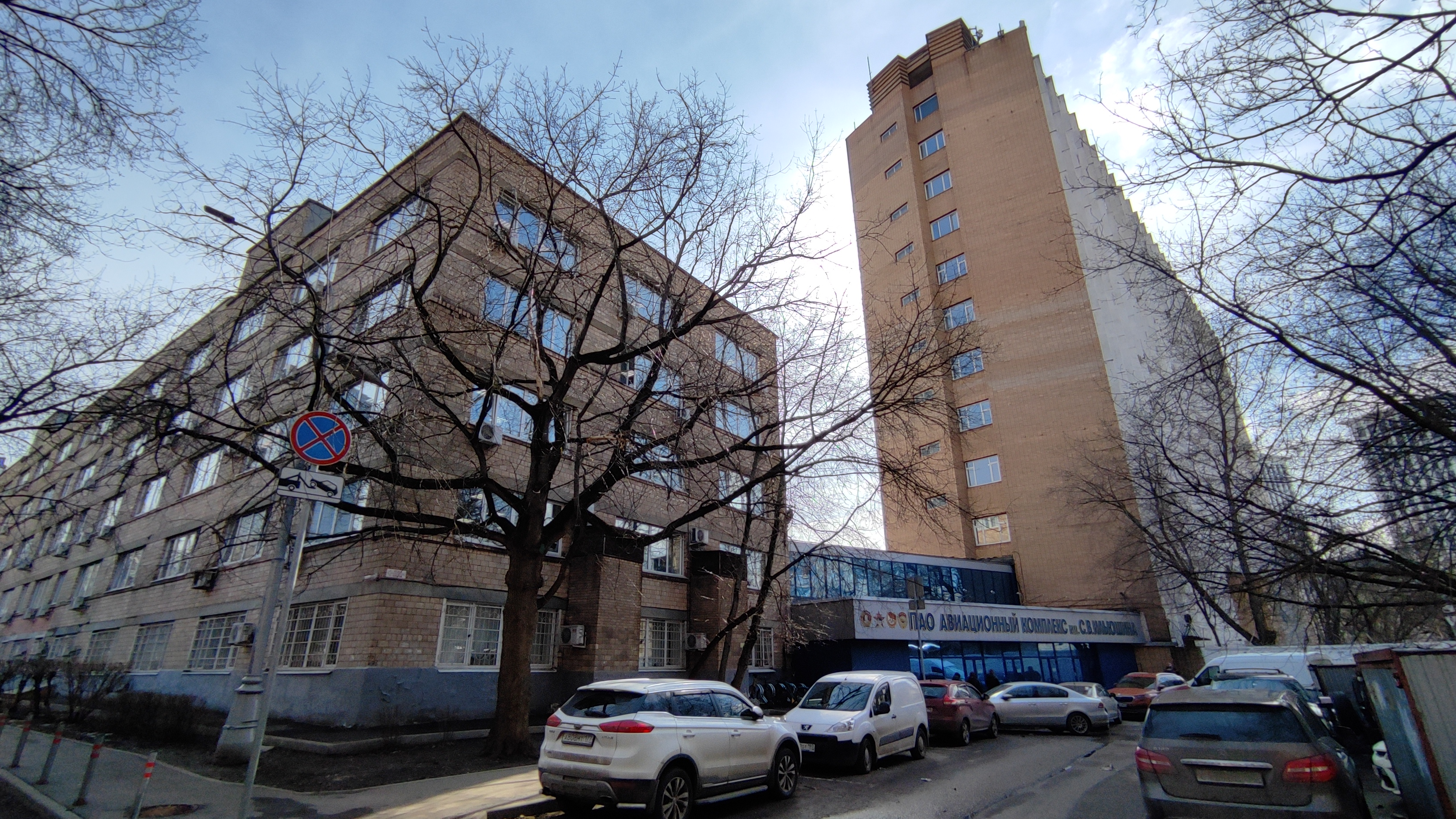
- Type: Division
- Industry: Aerospace; Defense
- Founded: 13 January 1933; 93 years ago
- Founder: Sergey Vladimirovich Ilyushin
- Fate: merged into United Aircraft Corporation
- Headquarters: Moscow, Russia
- Products: Military, transport and civilian aircraft
- Parent: United Aircraft Corporation
- Website: www.uacrussia.ru/en

The public joint stock company Ilyushin Aviation Complex, operating as Ilyushin (Russian: Илью́шин) or as Ilyushin Design Bureau, is a Russian aircraft manufacturer and design bureau, founded in 1933 by Sergey Vladimirovich Ilyushin. Soviet/Russian nomenclature identifies aircraft from Ilyushin with the prefix "Il-" (Russian: Ил-). Ilyushin has its head office in Aeroport District, Northern Administrative Okrug, Moscow.

== History ==
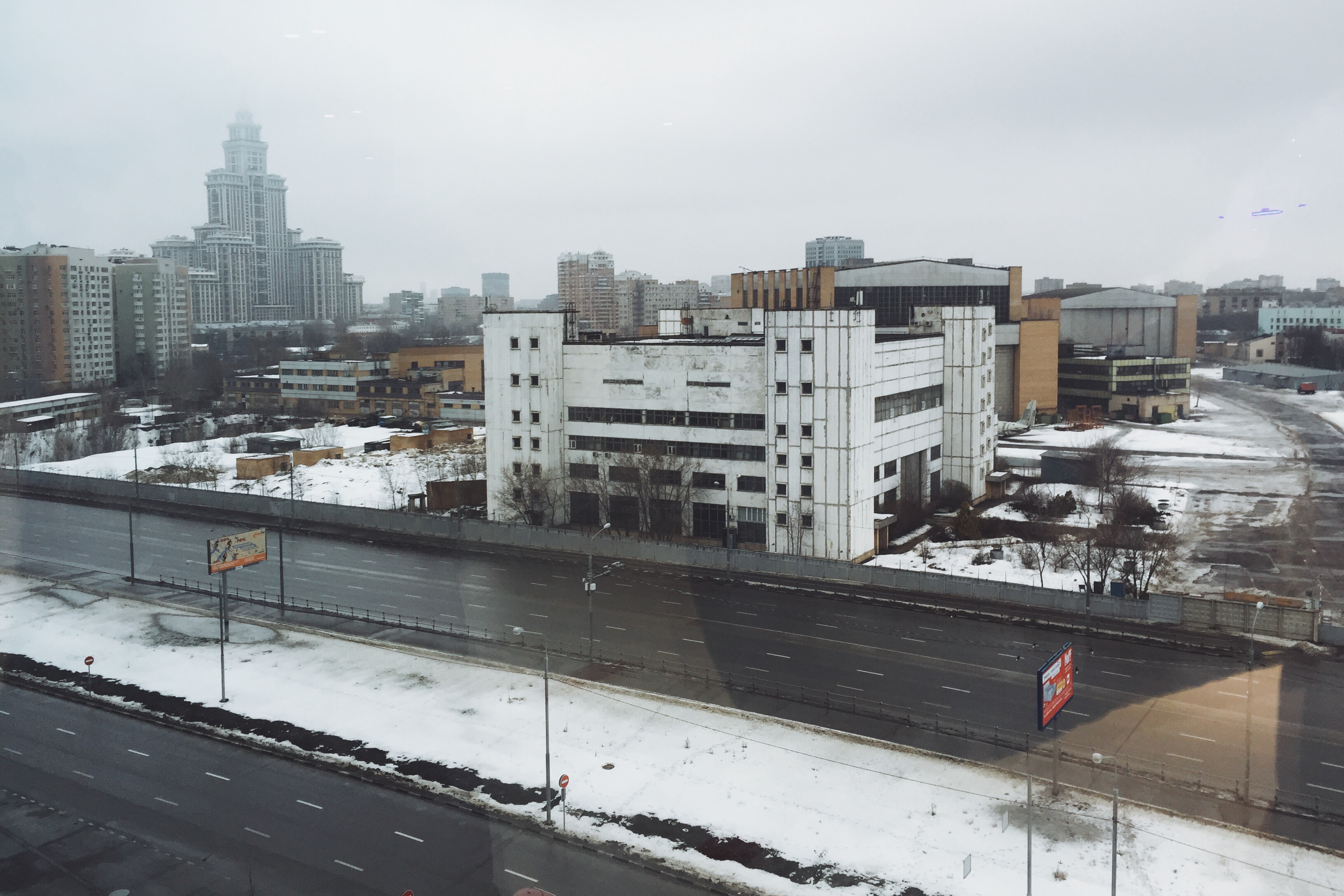
Ilyushin prototyping facility on Khodynka Field in Moscow

Ilyushin was established under the Soviet Union. Its operations began on 13 January 1933, by order of P. I. Baranov, People's Commissar of the Heavy Industry and the Head of the Main Department of Aviation Industry.

In 1970, the position of chief designer was taken by G. V. Novozhilov.

In 2006, the Russian government merged Ilyushin with Mikoyan, Irkut, Sukhoi, Tupolev, and Yakovlev under a new company named United Aircraft Corporation.

In July 2014, it was reported that Ilyushin and Myasishchev would merge to form the United Aircraft Corporation business unit Transport Aircraft.

== Subsidiaries and divisions ==
Aviation Industries Ilyushin is a subsidiary established in 1992 to act as Ilyushin's marketing and customer service arm.

Ilyushin Finance Co is a dedicated leasing and finance subsidiary that provides financial services for Ilyushin as well as other manufacturers.

== Awards ==
- 1942 — Order of Lenin
- 1944 — Order of the Red Banner
- 1969 — Order of the Red Banner of Labour
- 1983 — Order of the October Revolution

== Directors ==
- CEO from December 1995 to May 2014 — Viktor Vladimirovich Livanov;
- CEO since May 2014 — Yuri Mikhailovich Yudin;
- CEO since September 2014 — Sergey Alekseevich Sergeev;
- CEO since April 2015 — Sergey Vladimirovich Velmozhkin;
- CEO from May 2017 to April 2019 — Aleksey Dmitrievich Rogozin;
- CEO since April 2019 — Yuri Vladimirovich Grudinin;
- Managing Director since June 2020 — Sergey Yarkov.

== Shareholders ==
- PJSC United Aircraft Corporation — 8.99 % of shares
- JSC United Aircraft Corporation — Transport Aircraft — 78,49% of shares
- Private investors — 12,52% of shares

== See also ==
- List of Ilyushin aircraft
- List of military aircraft of the Soviet Union and the CIS
