= CASA C-207 Azor =

C-207 Azor
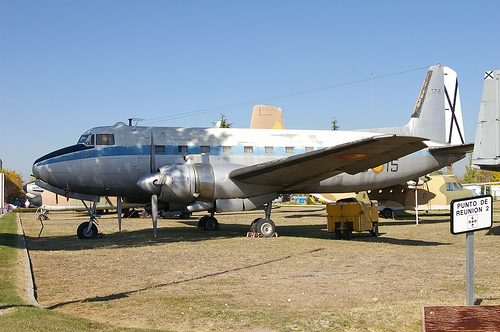
- T.7-6 CASA C-207 'Azor' 405-15 in the Museo del Aire de Cuatro Vientos, Madrid (Spain)

General information
- Type: Short/medium-range troop/cargo transport
- National origin: Spain
- Manufacturer: CASA
- Status: Retired
- Primary user: Spanish Air Force
- Number built: 20 with 2 Prototypes

History
- Manufactured: 1958–1967
- Introduction date: 1960
- First flight: 28 September 1955
- Retired: 1980s

The CASA C-207 Azor was a transport aircraft produced by Construcciones Aeronáuticas SA (CASA). It was a scaled-up version of the CASA C-202 Halcón and was designed for the domestic civil market. The C-207 received no civil orders, but the Spanish Air Force ordered ten. The first model, designated T.7A entered service in 1960. Ten more aircraft were ordered and configured for paratroop or cargo transport, designated CASA 207C(T.7B). The CASA 207 was one of the first aircraft to be designed by CASA in order to replace the transports in current service at the time, like the CASA 2.111 (Heinkel He 111) and the CASA 352 (Junkers Ju 52).

The two prototypes and 20 production aircraft served in the military until the early 1980s. Additionally, most of the aircraft were delivered to the 35th Transport wing.

== Development ==
The CASA 207 was developed as an airline-suited aircraft, for the short- to mid-range routes that were common in Spain and Europe. The Azor was deemed to be obsolete and uneconomical for its time and standards, for which better aircraft were available for its role. So, CASA turned its marketing attention to the Spanish Air Force, which had interest in a "modern" transport aircraft. CASA had previously experimented with transport aircraft to replace types already in service, such as the CASA C-201 and CASA C-202. They were plagued with underpowered engines and were cancelled. CASA decided to make a version of the 207 for the Spanish Air Force that would follow up to the C-201 and 202. The CASA 207A was built for the Air Force with a capacity of 40 passengers plus a crew of four. A batch of ten C-207C (or T.7B) were built with large doors and capacity for 37 Paratroopers.

The Hamburger Flugzeugbau and CASA offered a version driven by turboprop engines, but this plan was dropped due to the availability of the CASA 212 Aviocar.

== Variants ==
- C-207A/Prototypes – Used in military service; two built.
- C-207B – Capacity for 40 passengers or 4,000 kg of cargo. two of the batch of ten were fitted experimentally with the Pratt and Whitney Double Wasp engine. ten built.
- C-207C – Large cargo doors at the rear fuselage and space for 37 paratroopers. ten built.

== Operators ==
Spain

- Spanish Air Force

== Surviving aircraft ==
- T.7-1 – T.7 on static display at Getafe Air Base in Madrid.
- T.7-6 – T.7 on static display at the Museum of Aeronautics and Astronautics in Madrid.
- T.7-16 – T.7 on static display in Gelves, Seville.
- T.7-17 – T.7 on static display at the Museum of Aeronautics and Astronautics in Madrid.
- T.7-19 – T.7 on static display at the CASA factory at Getafe Air Base in Madrid.

== Specifications (207B) ==
Data from The Encyclopedia of World Aircraft

General characteristics

- Crew: four
- Capacity: 40 passengers or 4,000 kilograms of cargo.
- Length: 20.85 m (68 ft 5 in)
- Wingspan: 27.8 m (91 ft 2.5 in)
- Height: 7.75 m (25 ft 5 in)
- Wing area: 85.8 m^{2} (923.5 sq ft)
- Empty weight: 10,600 kg (23,370 lb)
- Gross weight: 16,500 kg (35,640 lb)
- Powerplant: 2 × Bristol Hercules 730 radial piston , 1,522 kW (2,040 hp) each

Performance

- Maximum speed: 420 km/h (261 mph, 227 kn)
- Cruise speed: 400 km/h (249 mph, 216 kn)
- Range: 2,350 km (1,460 mi, 1,270 nmi)
- Service ceiling: 8,000 m (26,250 ft)
- Rate of climb: 5.5 m/s (1,080 ft/min)

== See also ==
Related development

- CASA C-201 Alcotán
- CASA C-202 Halcón
