= CASA C-101 Aviojet =

Trainer aircraft family by CASA

C-101 Aviojet
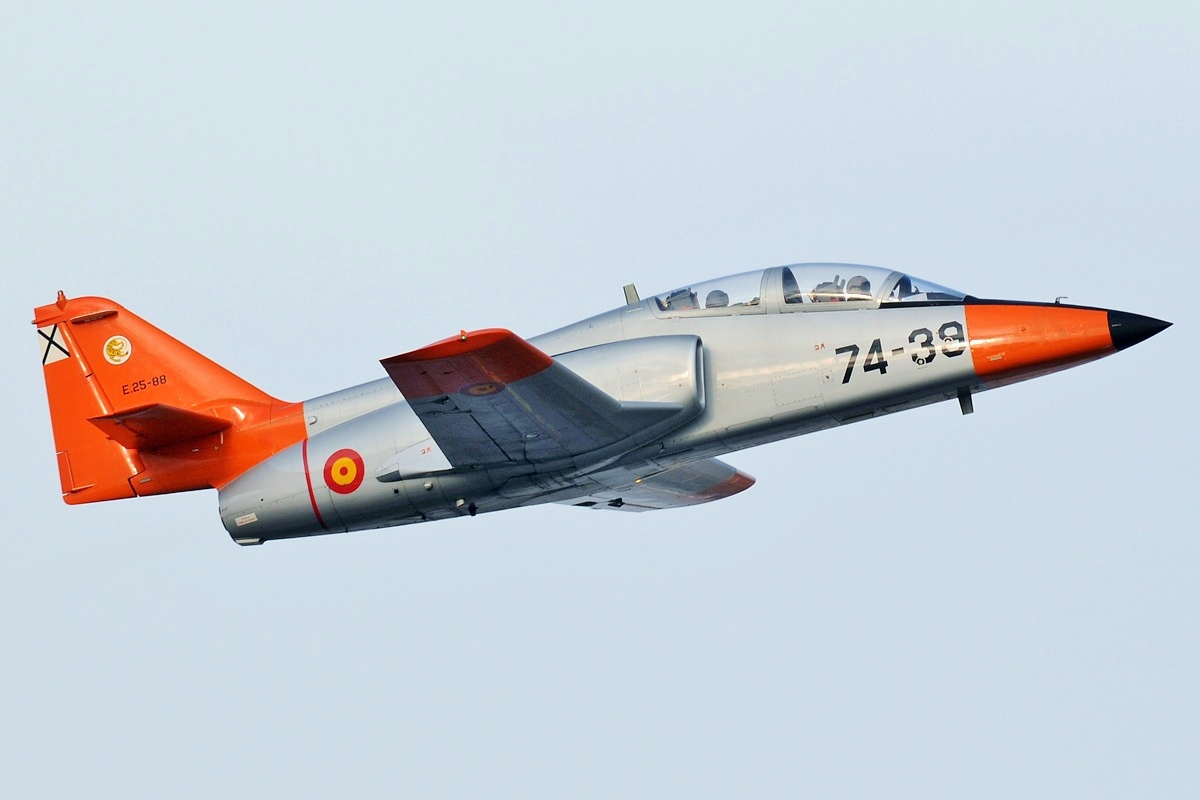
- Spanish Air Force C-101

General information
- Type: Advanced jet trainer and light attack aircraft
- Manufacturer: CASA
- Primary users: Spanish Air and Space Force Chilean Air Force; Honduran Air Force; Royal Jordanian Air Force
- Number built: 166

History
- Introduction date: 17 March 1980
- First flight: 27 June 1977
- Retired: 2025

The CASA C-101 Aviojet is a low-wing single engine jet-powered advanced trainer and light attack aircraft designed and manufactured by Spanish aircraft company Construcciones Aeronáuticas SA (CASA).

The C-101 was developed in response to a Spanish Air Force requirement, which needed a replacement for the outdated Hispano Saeta. During 1975, CASA commenced work on what would become the C-101. In addition to its own design team, technical assistance was provided by Germany's Messerschmitt-Bölkow-Blohm (MBB) and the United States' Northrop. In June 1977, the first of four prototypes performed the type's maiden flight. The design was somewhat reminiscent of other jet trainers of the era, such as the BAE Hawk and the Alpha Jet, but was less aerodynamically sophisticated, being equipped with an unswept wing. Performance of the C-101 during flight testing was reported in excess of predictions.

On 17 March 1980, the first examples were introduced to operational service with the Spanish Air Force, which would be the principal customer for the C-101. The initial model possessed only a limited weapons capability, this attack capability was expanded upon later-built aircraft. Several models were exported to overseas operators; the C-101 has been adopted by the Chilean Air Force, Honduran Air Force and the Royal Jordanian Air Force. A final improved model, designated C-101DD, was demonstrated but did not find customers and thus it did not enter serial production. In addition to its use as a trainer aircraft, it has been used to perform aerobatics; in the latter context, it has been flown by the Patrulla Aguila aerobatics team. As of 2019, the C-101 remains in service in the Spanish Air Force and several other countries.

Early on in the 2010s there were talks about the replacement of the C-101. Finally, in 2020 it was decided that the C-101 would be replaced by the Pilatus PC-21 (24) and the Airbus Future Jet Trainer (50 - 55). Later the Spanish Air Force decided to order up to 30 turkish Hürjets instead of the now-cancelled AFJT.

== Design and development ==
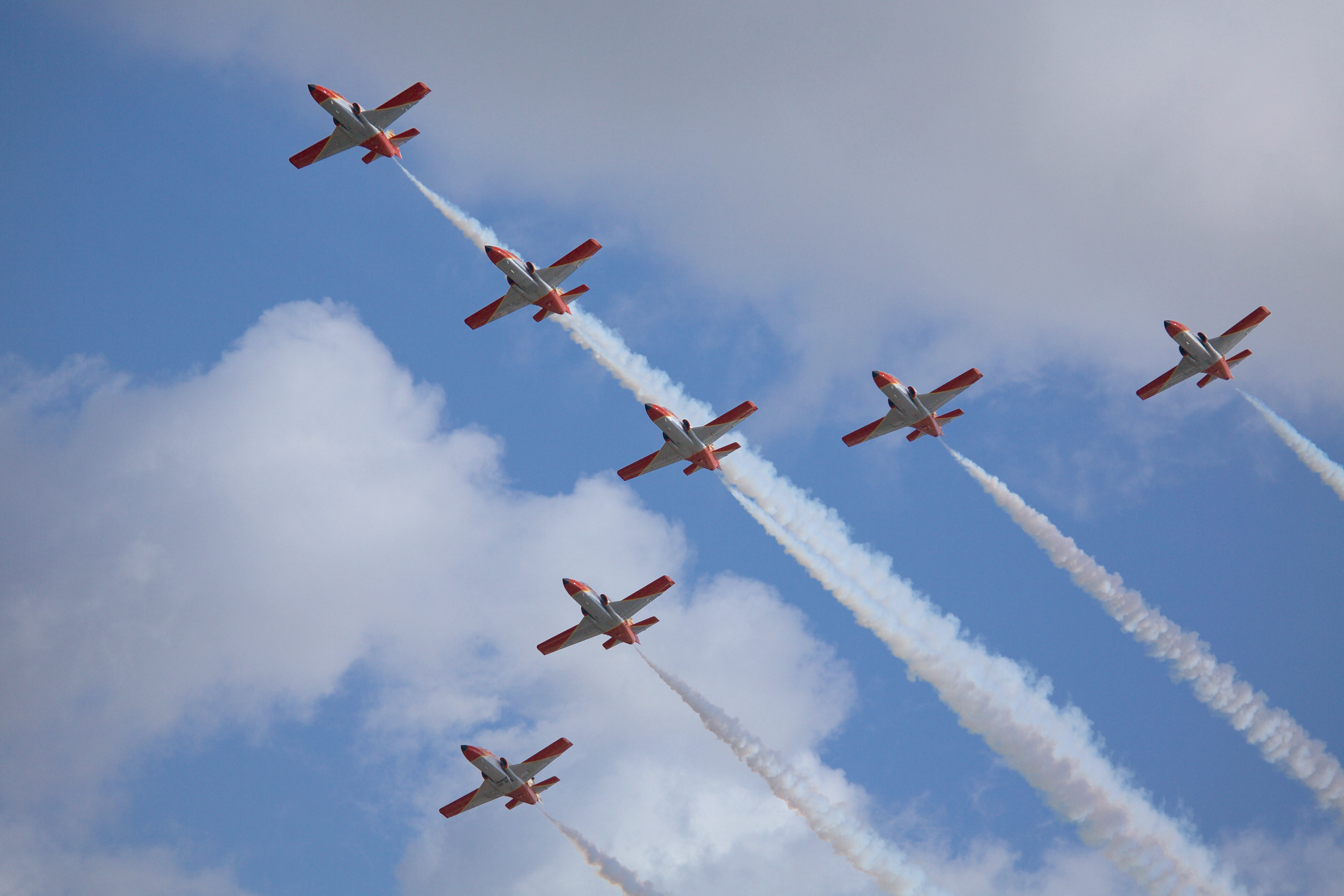
Patrulla Águila acrobatic team flying the C-101

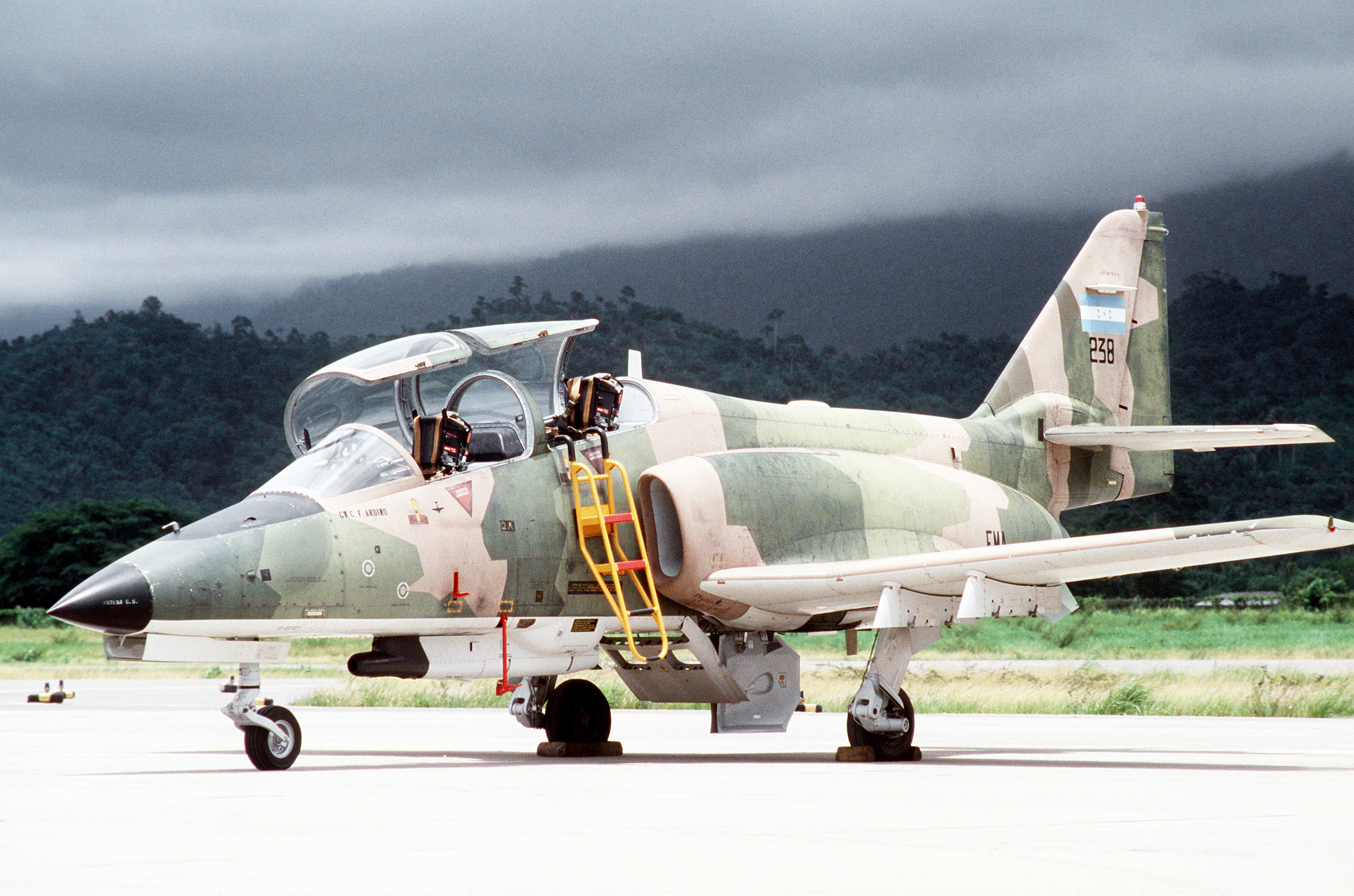
A C-101 Aviojet aircraft of the Honduran Air Force

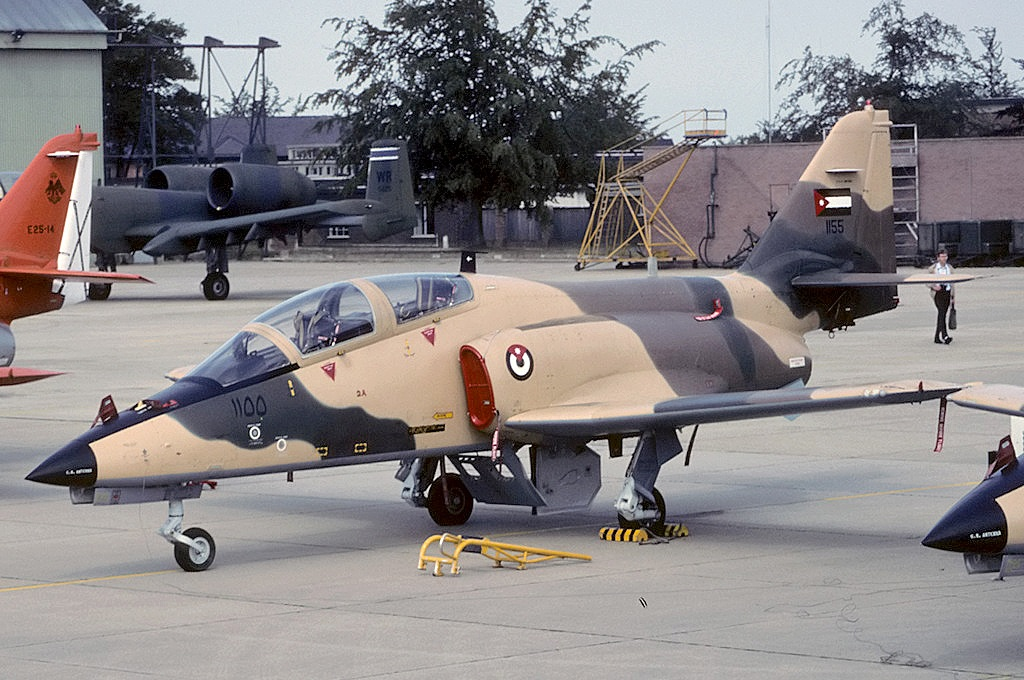
A C-101 Aviojet aircraft of the Jordanian Air Force

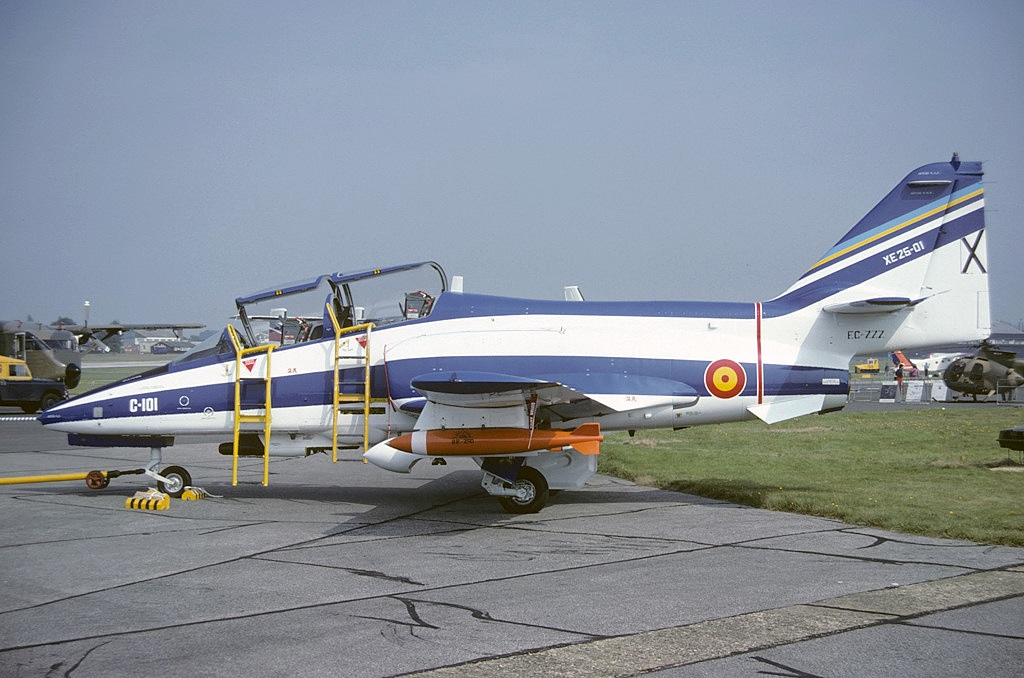
CASA C-101 prototype.

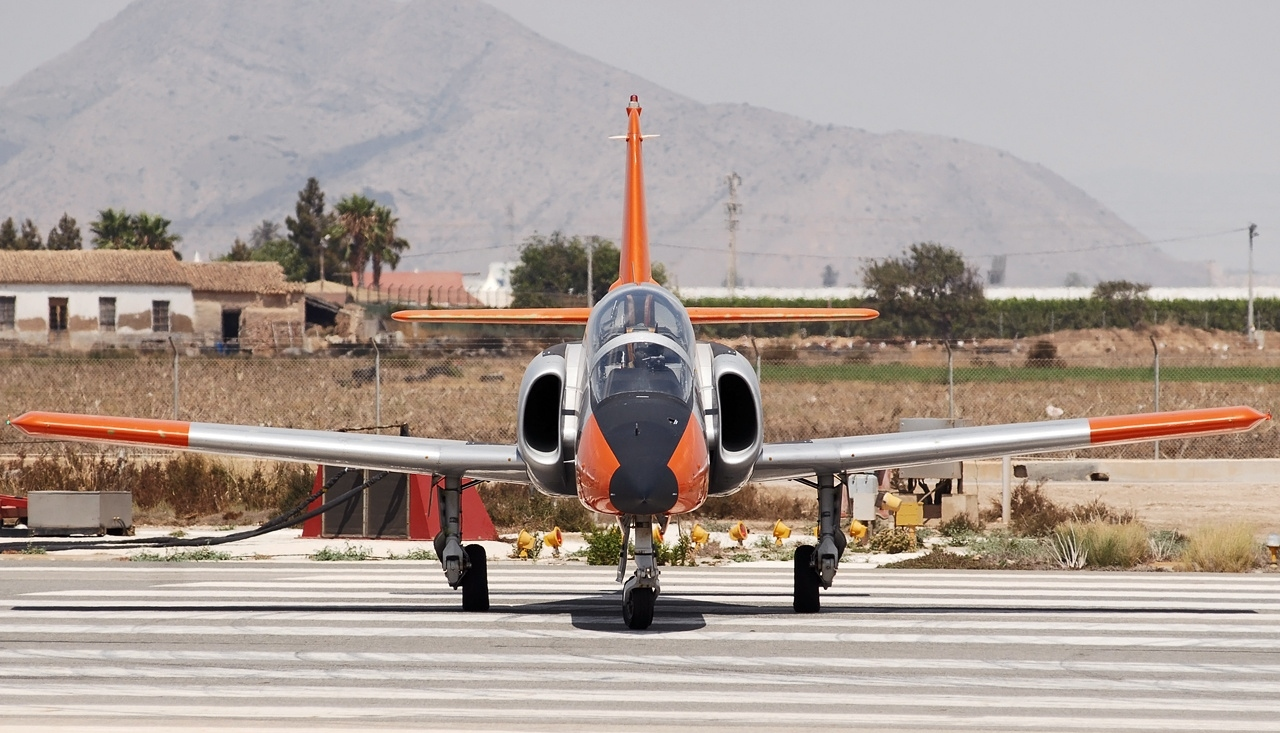
Spanish CASA C-101

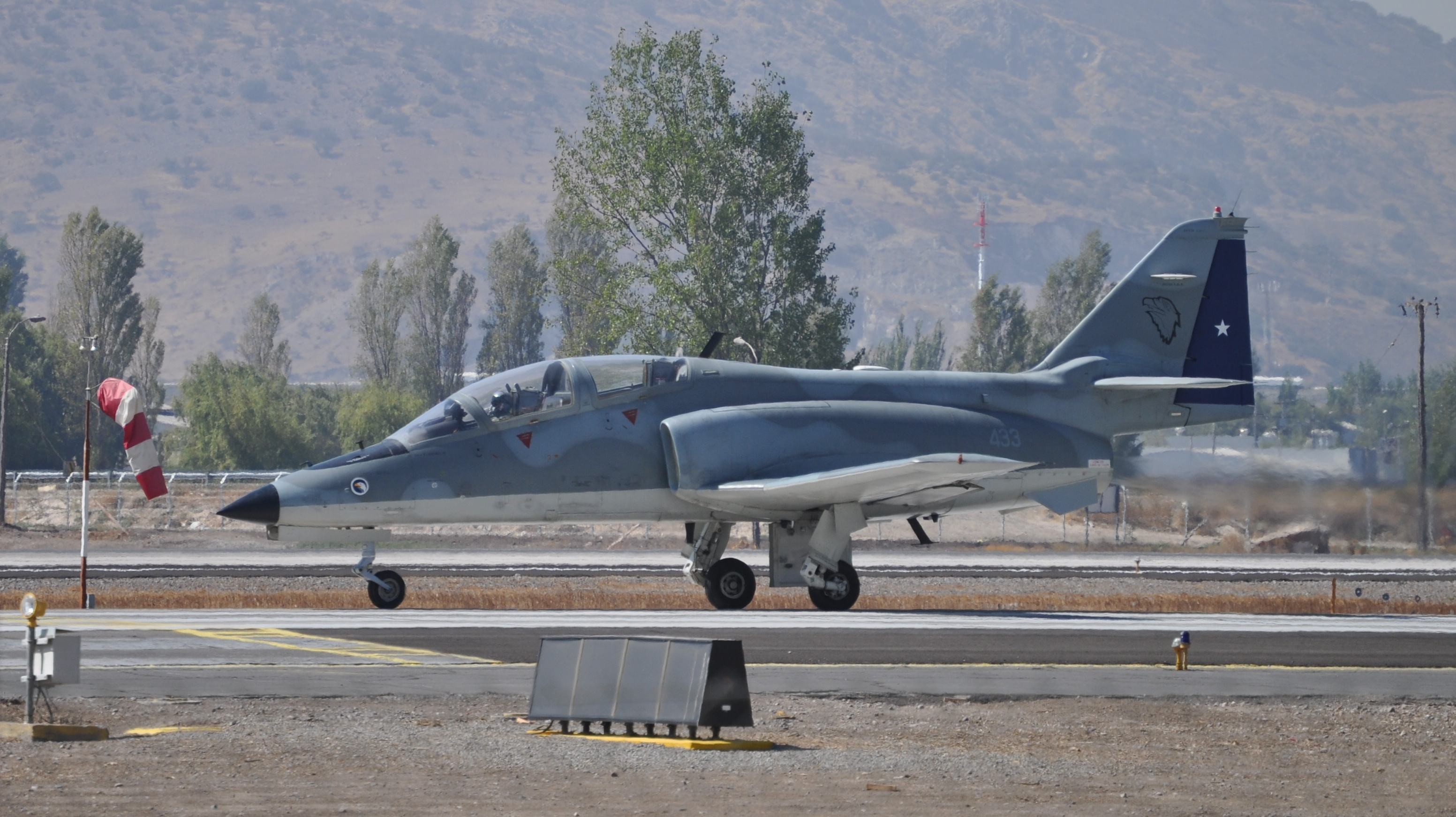
CASA C-101 of the Chilean Air Force in 2010

The C-101 was designed in response to a Spanish Air Force requirement issued in 1975, calling for a new jet trainer to replace its aging fleet of Hispano HA-200s and Ha.220s. Akin to the majority of contemporary European jet trainers, it was also to have a limited attack capability. During 1972, Hispano had been absorbed by Spanish aircraft company Construcciones Aeronáuticas SA (CASA), who took an interest in the trainer requirement. During October 1975, CASA was awarded a development contract based upon their submission, requiring a pair of static airframes and four flight-capable prototypes to be built for testing purposes at a cost of 1,297 million pesetas ($22 million).

To develop the aircraft, CASA sought technical assistance from abroad. Both the German manufacturing conglomerate Messerschmitt-Bölkow-Blohm (MBB) and American defense company Northrop opted to participate in the venture; specifically, engineers at MBB worked on the design of the rear fuselage and tail section while Northrop's team were responsible for the design of the aircraft's wings and engine inlets. Out of these efforts, a relatively conventional design was developed; according to aviation author John C. Fredriksen, the principles of simplicity and economy were highly emphasised by the design, shunning high performance features.

In terms of its basic configuration, the C-101 is a low-mounted monoplane, with unswept wings. The cockpit, which was relatively spacious amongst its peers, accommodated a crew of two in a tandem seating; the seats were staggered to provide the instructor in the rear position with greater visibility. The fuselage provided considerable internal space, permitting the installation of various additional aviation or supplemental systems as to suit future requirements or other secondary roles. Foreseen secondary roles included ground attack, armed escort, photographic reconnaissance, and as an electronic countermeasures (ECM) platform.

The only unconventional feature of the aircraft was the presence of a large internal weapons bay located beneath the rear cockpit; this allowed for a wider variety of armament to be carried than the underwing hard points could accommodate; alternatively, this bay enabled the carriage of other equipment, including reconnaissance payloads. In addition to the weapons bay, both armaments and stores could be fitted upon six underwing hard points. The design was produced in a modular fashion, which eases both manufacture and maintenance activities. It was provisioned with a considerable endurance range as a result of the initial requirement having called for a self-deployment capability to the Canary Islands from the Spanish mainland.

The powerplant selected for the aircraft was the Honeywell TFE731-5-1J turbofan engine. This unit was actually a commercial engine that had been re-developed for military use. Even from an early stage of development, the TFE731 was viewed as a front runner for the aircraft. According to Fredriksen, it provided relatively favourable performance and a high level of fuel economy amongst its peers. Overall, the aircraft provided mainly favourable characteristics while remaining an affordable trainer in comparison to international competition.

== Operational history ==
Although the first flight took place on 27 June 1977, the test flight phase, which included vibration, flutter and spin tests, did not commence until 17 April 1978. The prototype was flown in the Farnborough International Airshow during late July 1978. Performance was reportedly found to be better than anticipated by the designers. An initial order for 88 aircraft was placed by the Spanish Air Force; built as a dedicated trainer version, designated as C-101EB-01 by CASA and E.25 Mirlo ("Blackbird") by the air force. On 17 March 1980, the first aircraft entered service with the Spanish Air Force.

Shortly after this dedicated trainer model was introduced, the aircraft was followed in production by a combination attack/trainer variant. Equipped with an uprated engine, this variant was designated C-101BB-02. It was bought by numerous export customers, including Honduras, which bought four, and Chile, which bought four aircraft and parts for another eight to be assembled locally by ENAER. The Chilean BB-02s are designated T-36 Halcón.

In 1983, CASA flew a dedicated attack version, the C-101CC-02, which was again ordered by Chile. This time, only the prototype was built in Spain, with the remaining 22 machines built by ENAER. This variant featured yet another engine upgrade and increased fuel capacity; it has been designated A-36 Halcón ("Falcon"). All chilean T-36 and A-36 were finally retired in 2022.

Sixteen similar aircraft, the C-101CC-04 were sold to Jordan. During 2018, the last of these aircraft were phased out by the Royal Jordanian Air Force, with at least one aircraft being sold to Chile for ground insctructional use.

The final version of the C-101 to be developed, designated C-101DD, was first demonstrated by CASA during 1985. This model featured vastly improved avionics and featured systems such as a head-up display, HOTAS-cockpit, AN/ALR-66 radar warning receiver, chaff and flare countermeasures, as well as the capability to carry the AGM-65 Maverick air-to-ground missile; however, as of 2000 it had not attracted any orders.

Between 1990 and 1992, all Spanish Air Force C-101s received an extensive upgrade package which mainly focused on the aircraft's navigation and armament systems. After 45 years of service, the Spanish Air and Space Force retired the CASA C-101 jet trainer in June 2025 following its final air display at the Aire25 festival in San Javier. Having accumulated 285,000 training flight hours and served as the primary aircraft for the Patrulla Águila aerobatic team for four decades. The regular training services already ended in 2022.

== Operators ==
Chile

- Chilean Air Force (35 -12 C-101BB and 23 C-101CC) - retired in 2022

Honduras

- Honduran Air Force (4 C-101BB)

Jordan

- Royal Jordanian Air Force (16 C-101CC) – retired in 2018

Spain

- Spanish Air and Space Force (88 C-101EB) - retired in 2022 (Training) an 2025 (Patrulla Águila)

== Specifications (CASA C-101CC) ==
Data from Jane's all the World's Aircraft 1989–90

General characteristics

- Crew: 2
- Length: 12.5 m (41 ft 0 in)
- Wingspan: 10.6 m (34 ft 9 in)
- Height: 4.25 m (13 ft 11 in)
- Wing area: 20 m^{2} (220 sq ft)
- Aspect ratio: 5.6
- Airfoil: Norcasa 15 (15%)
- Powerplant: 1 × Honeywell TFE731-5-1J turbofan engine, 19.13 kN (4,300 lbf) thrust
- Military Power Reserve (MPR): 20.91 kN (4,700 lbf)

Performance

- Maximum speed: 769 km/h (478 mph, 415 kn) at 4,500 kg (9,921 lb) at sea level

806 km/h (501 mph; 435 kn) at 6,100 m (20,000 ft)
834 km/h (518 mph; 450 kn) at 4,575 m (15,000 ft) at MPR

- Cruise speed: 656 km/h (408 mph, 354 kn) / M0.6 at 9,145 m (30,000 ft)
- Unstick speed: 213 km/h (132 mph; 115 kn)
- Touchdown speed: 176 km/h (109 mph; 95 kn)
- Stall speed: 183 km/h (114 mph, 99 kn) flaps up

164 km/h (102 mph; 89 kn) flaps down

- Never exceed speed: 834 km/h (518 mph, 450 kn) / M0.8 at 4,500 kg (9,921 lb)
- Combat range: 519 km (322 mi, 280 nmi) typical lo-lo-lo interdiction, with 4x 250 kg (551 lb) bombs and 1x 30 mm (1.181 in) cannon

Typical CAS lo-lo-lo 370 km (230 mi) with 4x rocket launchers and 1x 30 mm (1.181 in) cannon
Typical CAS lo-lo-lo 315 km (196 mi) with 4x rocket launchers plus 2x 125 kg (276 lb) bombs and 1x 30 mm (1.181 in) cannon
Typical CAS lo-lo-lo 602 km (374 mi) with 2x AGM-65 Maverick and 1x 30 mm (1.181 in) cannon
Typical ECM 611 km (380 mi)
Typical Phot/recce 964 km (599 mi)

- Ferry range: 2,000 km (1,200 mi, 1,100 nmi) with 30 minutes reserve
- Endurance: typical armed patrol – three hours and 30 minutes

typical training mission one hour and 10 minutes
maximum endurance seven hours

- Service ceiling: 12,800 m (42,000 ft)
- g limits: +7.5 -3.9 at 4,500 kg (9,921 lb)

+5.5 -1 at 6,300 kg (13,889 lb)

- Rate of climb: 24.9 m/s (4,900 ft/min) (normal)

101.67 m (334 ft) (MPR)

- Thrust/weight: 0.322
- Take-off run: 560 m (1,840 ft)
- Landing run from 15 m (49 ft): 800 m (2,600 ft)

Armament

- Guns:

- 1 × 30 mm (1.181 in) DEFA cannon
or
- 2 × 12.7 mm (0.5 in) M3 machine guns in detachable pods underneath the forward fuselage

- Missiles:

- 2 – Rafael Shafrir (A-36 "Toqui") air-to-air missiles

- Bombs:

- Up to 2,220 kg (4,894 lb) disposable stores on 6 underwing pylons

== See also ==
Aircraft of comparable role, configuration, and era

- Aero L-39 Albatros
- Aermacchi MB-339
- AIDC AT-3
- BAE Systems Hawk
- Dassault/Dornier Alpha Jet
- FMA IA-63 Pampa
- HESA Yasin
- Hongdu JL-8
- IAR 99
- Kawasaki T-4
- Soko G-4 Super Galeb

Related lists

- List of fighter aircraft
