= Hispano HA-100 =

Spanish trainer aircraft

HA-100 Triana

General information
- Type: Military trainer
- National origin: Spain
- Manufacturer: Hispano Aviación
- Designer: Willy Messerschmitt
- Primary user: Spanish Air Force
- Number built: 2

History
- First flight: 10 December 1954

The Hispano HA-100 Triana (named for the district of Seville where the Hispano Aviación plant was located) was a military trainer aircraft developed in Spain in the 1950s. The first aircraft designed by Willy Messerschmitt after World War II, it was a conventional, low-wing cantilever monoplane with retractable tricycle undercarriage. The pilot and instructor sat in tandem.

The programme was initiated when the Spanish government issued a requirement in 1951 for a replacement for the Hispano HS-42s and HA-43s then in service. Hispano proposed two versions with different engine power, the HA-100E and HA-100F, the former for basic training, the latter for advanced training, and the construction of two prototypes of each was undertaken. Development was fraught with problems, mostly in obtaining suitable parts, and most particularly with engines. The ENMASA Sirio was originally selected for the HA-100E, but when this proved unavailable, the ENMASA Beta was used instead, a heavier and much more powerful engine than had been wanted for the basic trainer. As it transpired, the performance of this engine was far from satisfactory, and when the second prototype flew in February 1955 (the first HA-100F), it was powered by a Wright R-1300.

Flight testing was very positive, and the HA-100 performed well in comparative tests against the American T-28 Trojan, leading to a contract for 40 of the aircraft. However, obtaining engines remained a stumbling block, with Spain unable to afford to import the Wright engine in quantity. Eventually, production ground to a halt, and the decision was taken to scrap the airframes under construction, salvaging only the wings and empennages for use on the HA-200 project.

== Variants ==
HA-100E-1
basic trainer intended to have 336 kW (450 hp) ENMASA Sirio engine; prototype flew with 560 kW (750 hp) ENMASA Beta instead (1 built)
HA-100F-1
advanced trainer with Wright R-1300 engine and provision for underwing guns and disposable stores (1 built)
HA-110-C1
A proposed derivative of the HA-100E-1 with a different powerplant.

== Specifications (HA-100E) ==
Data from Jane's All The World's Aircraft 1961–62

General characteristics

- Crew: 2
- Length: 8.98 m (29 ft 6 in)
- Wingspan: 10.40 m (34 ft 1 in)
- Height: 2.90 m (9 ft 6 in)
- Wing area: 17.35 m^{2} (186.8 sq ft)
- Airfoil: 6.25:1
- Empty weight: 1,970 kg (4,343 lb)
- Gross weight: 2,930 kg (6,460 lb)
- Fuel capacity: 600 L (130 imp gal; 160 US gal)
- Powerplant: 1 × ENMASA B-4 Beta 9-cylinder radial engine, 563 kW (755 hp)

Performance

- Maximum speed: 444 km/h (276 mph, 240 kn)
- Cruise speed: 381 km/h (237 mph, 206 kn) at 2,900 m (9,500 ft) (70% power)
- Stall speed: 104 km/h (65 mph, 56 kn)
- Range: 1,323 km (822 mi, 714 nmi)
- Service ceiling: 10,250 m (33,630 ft)
- Rate of climb: 10.83 m/s (2,132 ft/min)
