= Hispano HA-200 =

1955 trainer aircraft family by Hispano Aviation

HA-200 Saeta
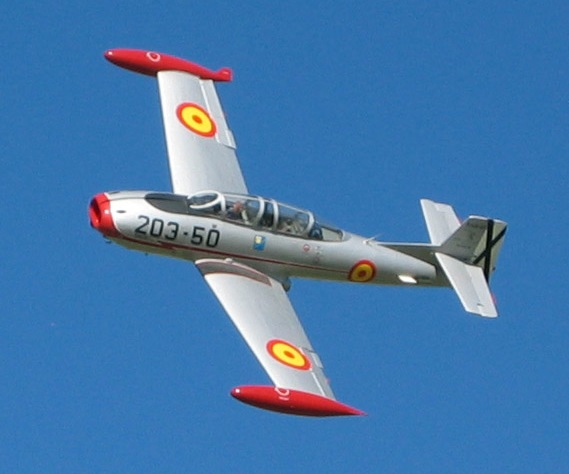

General information
- Type: Two-seat advanced jet trainer
- Manufacturer: Hispano Aviación
- Designer: Rafael Rubio Elola; Willy Messerschmitt
- Primary users: Spanish Air Force Egyptian Air Force
- Number built: 212 (90 in Egypt)

History
- Introduction date: 1962
- First flight: 12 August 1955
- Developed from: HA-100 Triana

The Hispano HA-200 Saeta (English: Arrow) is a twin-seat jet advanced trainer designed and produced by Spanish aircraft manufacturer Hispano Aviación. It has the distinction of being the first Spanish aircraft to harness jet propulsion.

The German aircraft designer Willy Messerschmitt can be largely credited for his role in designing the HA-200, which reused a substantial portion of the earlier piston-powered HA-100 Triana. On 12 August 1955, the first prototype conducted its maiden flight. It was not until 1962 that the first production aircraft performed its first flight. That same year, deliveries of the trainer aircraft commenced to the Spanish Air Force. It would be used in this capacity by the service for multiple decades.

The HA-200 was later further developed into the Hispano Aviación Ha-220 "Super Saeta", which functioned as a dedicated ground attack platform, armed with rockets, bombs, and other munitions. The HA-220 served in the Spanish Air Force throughout the 1970s, seeing action during the Polisario uprisings against insurgents. The HA-200 was also exported, the type being produced under license by Egypt, where it was designated as the Helwan HA-200B Al-Kahira. During the 1980s, the more capable CASA C-101 was introduced to Spanish service, supplementing and eventually succeeding the older HA-200 in both trainer and light attack roles.

== Development ==
=== Background ===
The origins of the HA-200 Saeta are heavily intertwined with the German aircraft designer Willy Messerschmitt, who was responsible for producing a significant proportion of its design. Following the end of the Second World War, Messerschmitt emigrated from Germany and begun offering his services to various other nations, including South Africa. During 1951, he had settled in Francoist Spain and shortly thereafter begun to design aircraft for the government in conjunction with local aircraft manufacturer Hispano Aviación. During the early 1950s, Messerschmitt worked on the HA-100 Triana, a piston-powered prototype trainer aircraft; while never attaining production, this design would subsequently serve as the basis for the HA-200. In fact, the two aircraft directly shared many design features, including the wing, tail unit, and tricycle undercarriage; original elements were largely confined to the area forward of the cockpit.

As early as 1951, Messerschmitt had promoted the idea of Spain developing its independent aviation industry, as well as suggesting the pursuit of both an indigenous jet fighter and jet engine. Throughout the 1950s, progress on the HA-200 programme was supervised by Messerschmitt from Hispano's office in Seville. It would be Spain's first indigenously-developed aircraft to be powered by the turbojet engine. On 12 August 1955, the first prototype conducted its maiden flight, flown by Major Fernando de Juan Valiente, the company's chief test pilot. Valiente later praised the prototype's handling qualities, stating them to be light and responsive, including "viceless and straightforward" stall characteristics.

Early on, the French Turbomeca Marboré turbojet engine had been selected to power the type; Spain had successfully negotiated a license to locally produce this engine. Development was protracted, the first production aircraft, which was designated by the manufacturer as HA-200A, first flew during October 1962. Shortly thereafter, the initial version of the aircraft were delivered to the Spanish Air Force; in service, it was operated under the service designation E.14.

=== Further development ===
The initial trainer model of the aircraft was shortly followed on by a single-seat version, designated as the HA-220, which was designed to perform ground attack missions. On 25 April 1970, this new model made its first flight. During the early 1970s, the ground attack-orientated HA-220 entered into service with the Spanish Air Force, which designated the type as C.10. It remained in service for barely a decade, all of the C.10s being withdrawn from Spanish service by the end of 1981.

During the late 1950s, the emerging HA-200 had drawn the attention of Egyptian President Gamal Abdel Nasser; around this time, Nasser was passionate on the subject of developing Egyptian industrial and military capabilities alike, which included the domestic production of modern jet aircraft. Negotiations between Spain and Egypt were facilitated by Messerschmitt, who acted as a key go-between for the two parties. During 1959, an arrangement was reached that led to the HA-200 being produced under license in Egypt at the Helwan Air Works. Hispano provided documentation pertaining to the aircraft's design and manufacture to support these efforts. Both the airframe and the engines were locally manufactured. According to aerospace periodical Flight International, a total of 65 HA-200s were reportedly constructed at Helwan between 1960 and 1969. In Egyptian Air Force service, the type was commonly referred to as the Helwan HA-200B Al-Kahira.

According to Flight International, during the early 1960s, Egypt and Spain were collaborating on the development of a six-seater business jet directly derived from the HA-200. Around this time, the two nations jointly worked on various aviation projects, including the Helwan HA-300, a cancelled supersonic fighter aircraft.

== Design ==
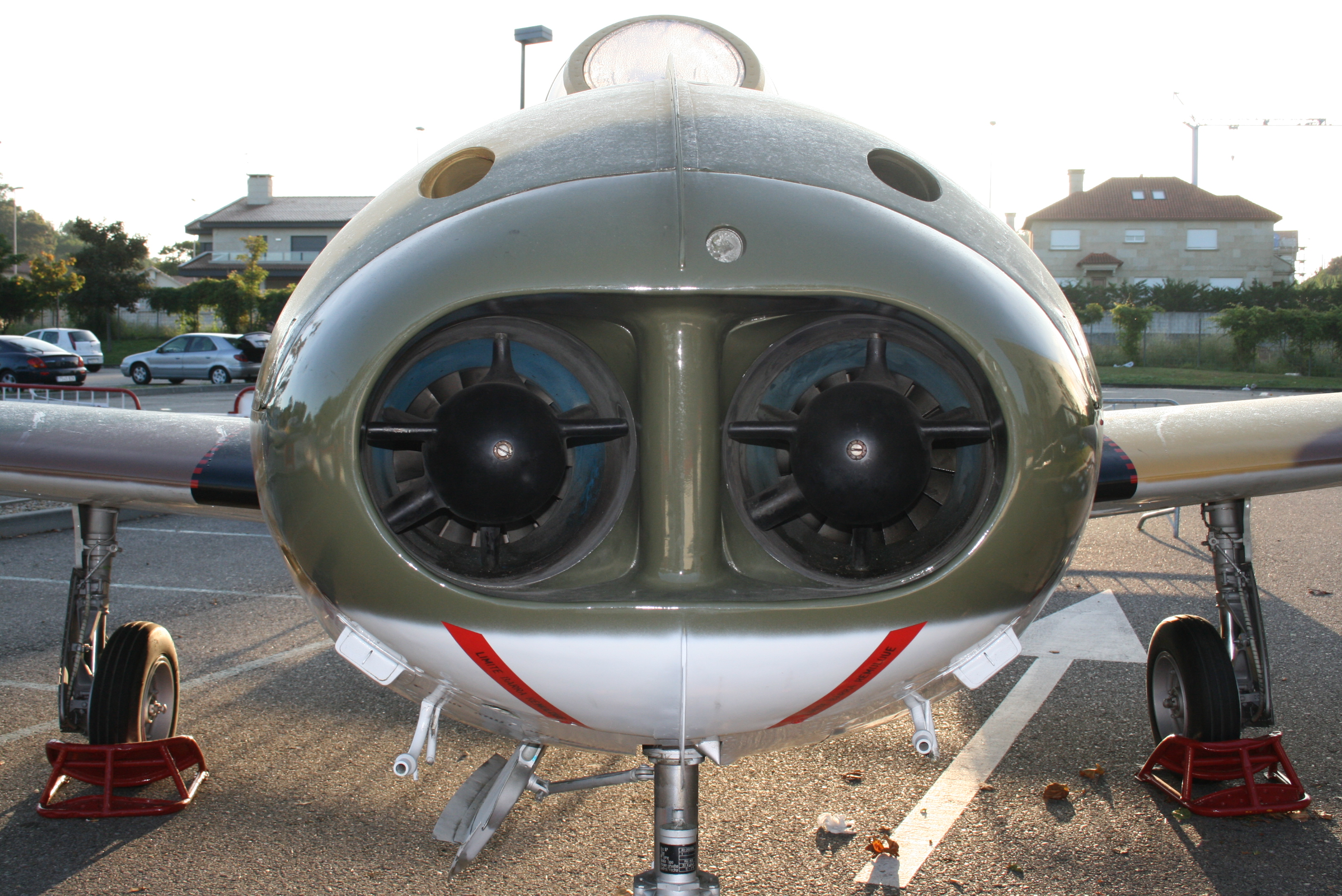
Close-up view of the nose intake

The HA-200 Saeta is a jet-powered trainer aircraft. In terms of its configuration, it is a low-winged monoplane, featuring all-metal construction and a retractable tricycle undercarriage arrangement. Structurally, it was relatively conventional for the era, using semi-monocoque lightweight alloy construction. The cockpit of the HA-200 accommodated a crew of two in a tandem seating configuration; however, the ground-attack orientated HA-220 was furnished with a single-seat cockpit instead. For greater crew comfort, this cockpit was pressurised, the HA-200 being the first Spanish aircraft to possess this facility.

The HA-200's propulsion consisted of a pair of Turbomeca Marboré turbojet engines, which were installed in a side-by-side arrangement inside the forward fuselage and mounted on a stressed-skin structure that forms the outer surface of the fuselage's underside. Air was fed to the engines via a large intake on the front of the nose; this particular intake arrangement has been described as being unique amongst jet aircraft. The engine's exhaust nozzles were located upon the lower fuselage, just aft of the trailing edge of the wing. A maximum of 261 gallons of fuel could be carried across a pair of fuselage tanks, two wing tanks and two permanently-attached tip tanks; provisions were made for jettisoning fuel in emergency situations. For weapons training purposes, the HA-200 featured provisions for the carriage of armaments.

== Operational history ==
In 1970, the HA-200 replaced the aging CASA 2.111 (a Spanish development of the Heinkel He 111) in Escuadrón 462 on the Canary Islands. From there, they frequently flew on detachments to Spanish Sahara.

On 18-19 December 1974, during the Polisario uprisings, the HA-200 conducted its first combat missions against the Polisario Front, when taking off from the Smara airfield, they supported troops of the Spanish Legion during an assault on a Polisario stronghold embedded in rocky caves. Polisario guerillas had ambushed a police patrol from higher ground, keeping them pinned from their protected positions. In response, a pair of Saetas, armed with 2.75-inch FFARs, were called to pound the rebel entrenchments. Diving at a 45-degree angle while firing rocket salvos with minimal dispersion and high accuracy at the cave entrances, the HA-200's qualities proved itself most suitable for the role. Following the airstrike, and after an offensive recce mission carried out by UH-1 attack helicopters, airborne Legion troops landed from UH-1s transports and cleared the position. At least six insurgents were killed, three wounded and three taken prisoners, not before the Legion suffered some casualties (1 officer, 1 NCO and four indigenous policemen killed ).

== Variants ==
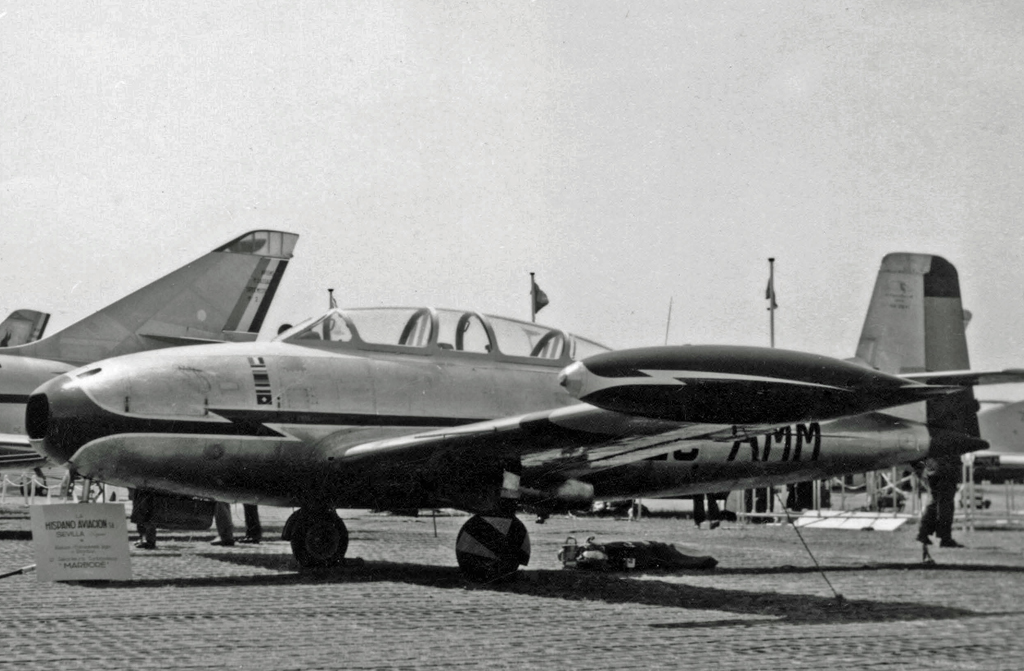
The prototype HA-200R Saeta displayed at the 1957 Paris Air Show

HA-200R Saeta
Two prototype aircraft
HA-200A Saeta
Initial production version with, 30 built.
HA-200B Saeta
Ten pre-production aircraft with Turbomeca Marboré IIA engines for delivery to Egypt, another 90 built under licence in Egypt.
HA-200D Saeta
Improved version for the Spanish Air Force with updated systems, 55 built.
HA-200E Super Saeta
HA-200D re-engined with Marbore VI engines, updated avionics and provision for air-to-ground rockets, 40 conversions.
HA-220 Super Saeta
Ground attack version of the HA-200E for Spanish Air Force, 25 built.

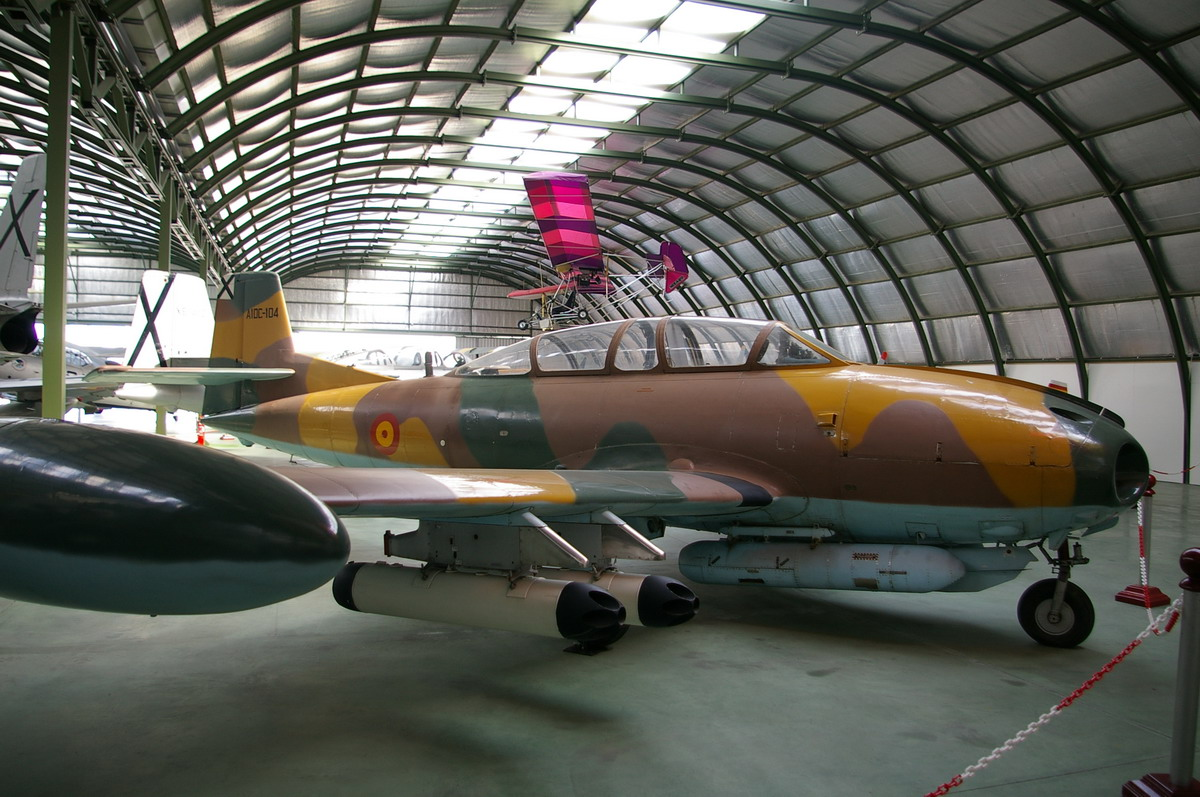
Hispano Aviacion HA-220D Super Saeta

E.14 Saeta
Spanish military designation of the two-seat versions of the HA-200.
C.10 Super Saeta
Spanish military designation of the single-seat ground-attack HA-220D & HA-220E versions. Later redesignated A.10.
Helwan HA-200B Al-Kahira
Designation of 90 Egyptian licence built aircraft.
HA-56
Proposed six-seat business jet derivative of HA-200, to be named HA-230 if taken forward. Unbuilt.

== Operators ==
Egypt

- Egyptian Air Force

Spain

- Spanish Air Force

== Specifications (HA-200E) ==
Data from Jane's All The World's Aircraft 1965-66

General characteristics

- Crew: 2
- Length: 8.92 m (29 ft 3 in)
- Wingspan: 11.02 m (36 ft 2 in) (over tip tanks)
- Height: 3.26 m (10 ft 8 in)
- Wing area: 17.40 m^{2} (187.3 sq ft)
- Airfoil: 6.22:1
- Empty weight: 1,990 kg (4,387 lb)
- Max takeoff weight: 3,450 kg (7,606 lb)
- Fuel capacity: 1,389 L (367 US gal; 306 imp gal) (including tip tanks)
- Powerplant: 2 × Turbomeca Marboré VI turbojets, 4.71 kN (1,058 lbf) thrust each

Performance

- Maximum speed: 700 km/h (430 mph, 380 kn) at 8,000 m (26,000 ft)
- Cruise speed: 600 km/h (370 mph, 320 kn) at 8,000 m (26,000 ft)
- Stall speed: 130 km/h (81 mph, 70 kn) (flaps down)
- Never exceed speed: 790 km/h (490 mph, 430 kn) (max dive speed)
- Range: 1,400 km (870 mi, 760 nmi)
- Service ceiling: 13,000 m (43,000 ft)
- Rate of climb: 16.99 m/s (3,345 ft/min)

Armament

- Hardpoints: Two

== See also ==
Related development

- Hispano HA-100

Aircraft of comparable role, configuration, and era

- BAC Jet Provost
- Cessna T-37 Tweet
- Fokker S.14 Machtrainer
- Fouga CM.170
