= CASA III =

1920s Spanish two-seat monoplane

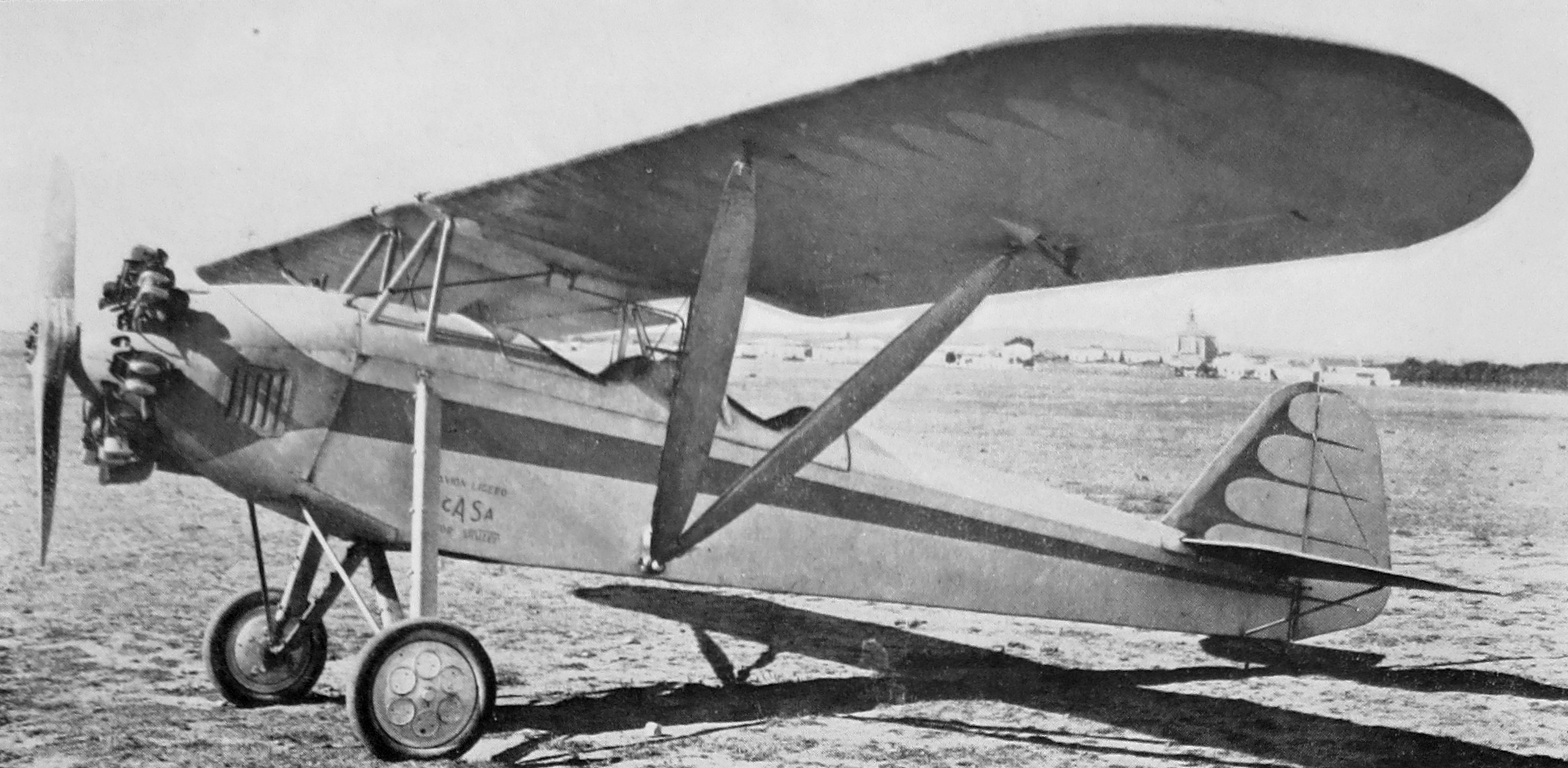

General information
- Type: Two-seat trainer monoplane
- National origin: Spain
- Manufacturer: Construcciones Aeronáuticas SA
- Designer: Luis Sousa Peco
- Number built: 9

History
- First flight: 2 July 1929

The CASA III was a 1920s Spanish two-seat monoplane, designed by Luis Sousa Peco and built by Construcciones Aeronáuticas SA (CASA) at Getafe near Madrid.

== Design and development ==
In 1929 using experience from the production of licence-built aircraft the company built the CASA III. It was originally designed as a light bomber monoplane for the Aeronáutica Naval air arm of the Spanish Navy, but since its performance was poor the prototypes were used as touring aircraft, ending up as trainers at Pollensa´s Naval Air School.

The CASA III was a parasol wing monoplane with a fabric-covered steel tube fuselage. It had two tandem open cockpits and wide track fixed conventional landing gear with a tail skid. The wings were hinged at the rear spar and they could be folded for storage or transport.

The M-CAGG registered prototype first flew on 2 July 1929 and was powered by a 90 hp (67 kW) Cirrus III piston engine. Within a few weeks the aircraft took part in a handicap air race between Madrid and Burgos and on 23 December 1929 it became the first light aircraft to land in the Canary Islands. The second aircraft was fitted with a 100 hp (75 kW) Isotta Fraschini Asso 80A engine but it was not a success. In 1930 three CASA III aircraft entered the 1930 Aerial Tour of Europe, but only two actually competed; the prototype which retired with a broken landing gear, and the de Havilland Gipsy I powered third-aircraft (M-CMAM) which arrived too late for the start although it completed the course. A total of nine aircraft were built, all with different engines, including the de Havilland Gipsy III and the Elizalde A6 radial engine. The last aircraft built was delivered to the Spanish Navy.

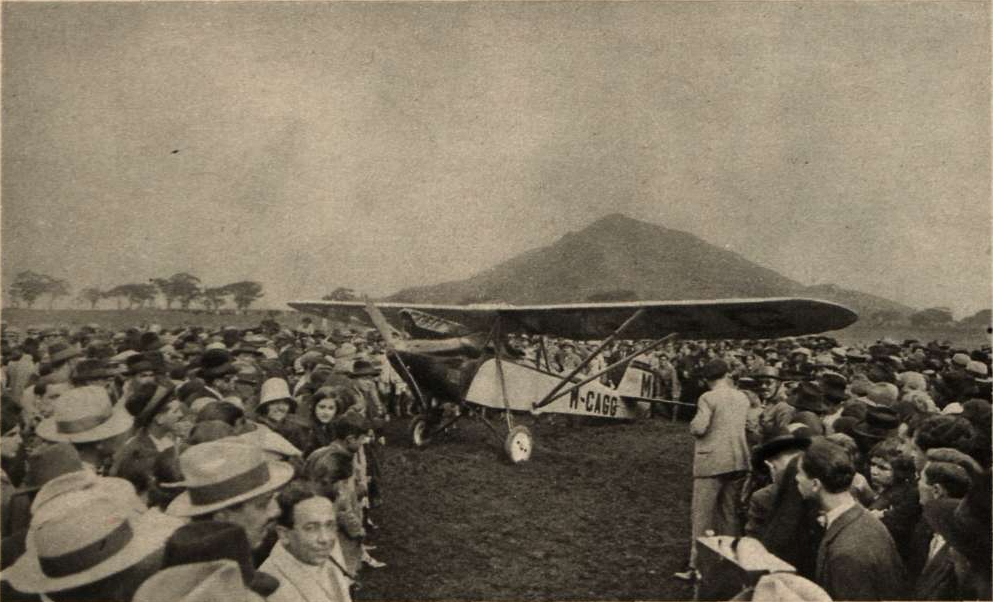
CASA III at Los Rodeos airport piloted by Ernesto Navarro Márquez.

Suitable power plants included:- de Havilland Gipsy I, de Havilland Gipsy II, de Havilland Gipsy III, Isotta Fraschini Asso 80 R., Lorraine 5P, Walter Venus and Elizalde D V.

== Operational history ==
During the Spanish Civil War all the remaining CASA IIIs were operated by the Republican forces and none of them survived.

== Operators ==
Spain (Kingdom)

- Aeronáutica Naval

Spain

- Spanish Republican Air Force

== Specifications (Gipsy I-powered) ==
Data from Jane's all the World's Aircraft 1931

General characteristics

- Crew: 2
- Length: 7.5 m (24 ft 7 in)
- Wingspan: 11.6 m (38 ft 1 in)
- Height: 2.5 m (8 ft 2 in)
- Wing area: 18 m^{2} (190 sq ft)
- Empty weight: 480 kg (1,058 lb)
- Gross weight: 800 kg (1,764 lb)
- Powerplant: 1 × de Havilland Gipsy I 4-cylinder air-cooled upright in-line piston engine, 71 kW (95 hp)
- Propellers: 2-bladed wooden fixed-pitch propeller

Performance

- Maximum speed: 200 km/h (120 mph, 110 kn) at sea level

170 km/h (110 mph; 92 kn) at 2,000 m (6,600 ft)
155 km/h (96 mph; 84 kn) at 4,000 m (13,000 ft)

- Stall speed: 68 km/h (42 mph, 37 kn)
- Ferry range: 1,000 km (620 mi, 540 nmi) with fuselage auxiliary tank
- Service ceiling: 4,500 m (14,800 ft) (absolute)
- Time to altitude: 1,000 m (3,300 ft) in 5 minutes 40 seconds

2,000 m (6,600 ft) in 14 minutes 30 seconds
3,000 m (9,800 ft) in 27 minutes
4,000 m (13,000 ft) in 48 minutes

- Wing loading: 44 kg/m^{2} (9.0 lb/sq ft)
- Power/mass: 0.094 kW/kg (0.057 hp/lb)

== See also ==
Aircraft of comparable role, configuration, and era

- Loring T-1

Related lists

- List of Interwar military aircraft
- List of aircraft of the Spanish Republican Air Force
