= CASA C-102 =

C-102

General information
- Type: Military trainer
- Manufacturer: CASA
- Status: Cancelled project
- Number built: 0

The CASA C-102 was a military trainer aircraft designed in Spain in the late 1970s but never actually built. The project was initiated by a 1977 request to CASA by the Ejército del Aire for such an aircraft. The company's response was a conventional all-metal monoplane with a T-tail, fixed tricycle undercarriage and side-by-side seating for the pilot and instructor.

At the end of the following year, the Air Force commenced the formal tendering process for the Futuro Avión Ligero Selectivo ("Future Selective Light Aircraft"), to which CASA submitted a developed and refined version of the design, now known as the C-102S. The company had also laid out a four-seat utility version as the C-102SE.

Interest by the Air Force waned after this, and no order for the aircraft was placed. It was to be a full decade before the Ejército del Aire filled this niche with a modern aircraft, which would eventually be the Chilean ENAER Pillán built under licence by CASA.
