= CASA C-202 Halcón =

C-202 Halcón
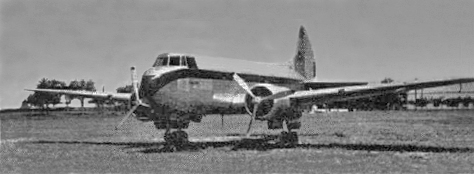

General information
- Type: transport
- National origin: Spain
- Manufacturer: CASA
- Primary user: Spanish Air Force
- Number built: 20

History
- First flight: May 15, 1952

The CASA C-202 Halcón was a twin-engine transport aircraft, constructed by CASA.

The Halcón was designed for use on Spain's international air routes. It had tricycle landing gear and a heated/air-conditioned cabin which could accommodate fourteen passengers. Twenty aircraft were initially ordered, and delivered to the Spanish Air Force with the designation T.6.

== Operators ==
Spain

- Spanish Air Force

== Specifications (CASA-202) ==
Data from Jane's All The World's Aircraft 1961–62

General characteristics

- Crew: three
- Capacity: 14 passengers
- Length: 16.0 m (52 ft 6 in)
- Wingspan: 21.58 m (70 ft 10 in)
- Height: 1.85 m (6.06 ft)
- Wing area: 57.50 m^{2} (618.9 sq ft)
- Aspect ratio: 8.11:1
- Airfoil: NACA 23018 at root, NACA 23009 at tip
- Empty weight: 5,364 kg (11,826 lb)
- Gross weight: 7,750 kg (17,086 lb)
- Fuel capacity: 2,140 L (570 US gal; 470 imp gal)
- Powerplant: 2 × ENMASA Beta B-41 nine-cylinder air-cooled radial engines, 578 kW (775 hp) each (take-off power)

Performance

- Maximum speed: 375 km/h (233 mph, 202 kn) at 2,900 m (9,500 ft)
- Cruise speed: 335 km/h (208 mph, 181 kn)
- Range: 1,210 km (750 mi, 650 nmi)
- Service ceiling: 7,250 m (23,790 ft)

== See also ==
Related development

- CASA C-201 Alcotán
- CASA C-207 Azor
