= CASA (aircraft manufacturer) =

Defunct Spanish aircraft manufacturing company (1923-2009)

EADS CASA
- Company type: Subsidiary
- Industry: Aviation
- Founded: 1923
- Founder: José Ortiz-Echagüe
- Defunct: 2009
- Fate: Merged into Airbus Military
- Successor: Airbus Military
- Headquarters: Getafe
- Products: various types of aircraft and aerospace components
- Revenue: 15,740,000,000 United States dollar (2013)
- Parent: EADS

Construcciones Aeronáuticas SA (CASA) was a Spanish aircraft manufacturer that was founded in 1923 and began manufacturing aircraft the following year. In 1999 it became a subsidiary of the EADS (European Aeronautic Defence and Space Company) under the name EADS CASA and in 2009 was absorbed into Airbus Military. CASA designed and produced military transport aircraft such as the CASA C-212 Aviocar, the CASA CN-235, the CASA C-295 and the CASA C-101 trainer/ground attack aircraft.

== History ==
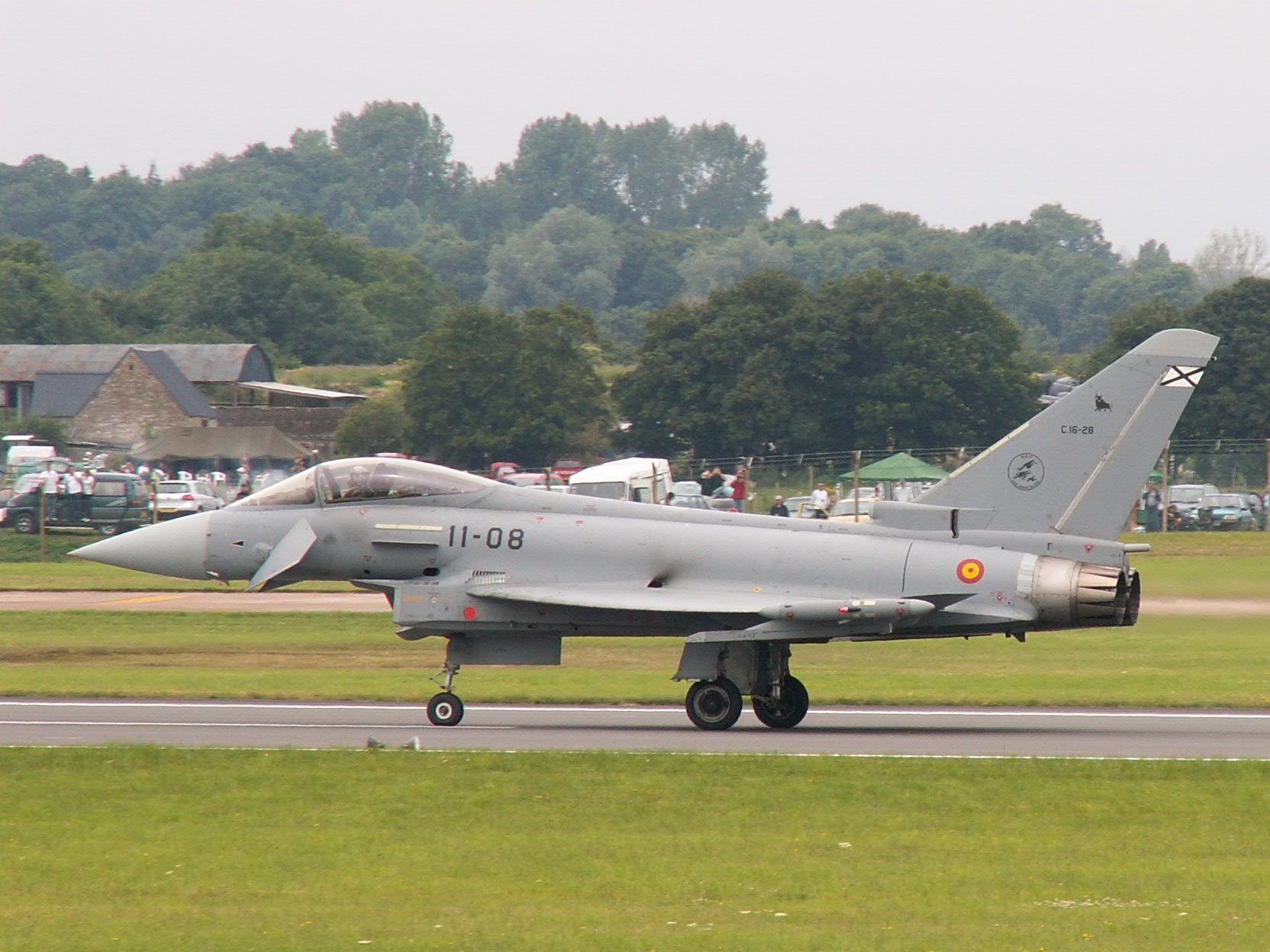
The Eurofighter Typhoon is assembled in Spain by EADS-CASA for the Spanish Air Force

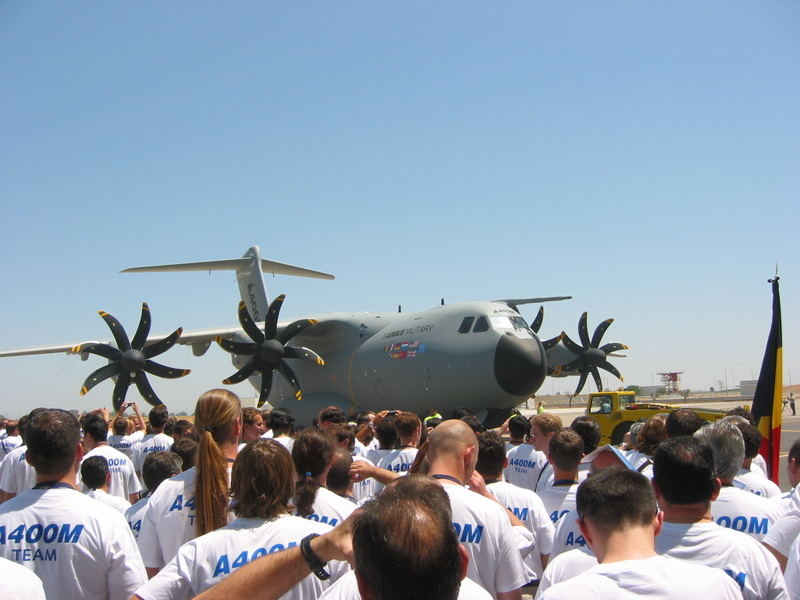
The first A400M, surrounded by EADS employees, during the aircraft's roll-out in Seville on 26 June 2008

Construcciones Aeronáuticas SA (CASA) was founded by José Ortiz-Echagüe in 1923 and began work on a factory in Getafe in May 1924, building Breguet aircraft under license. The first order covered 26 19 A.2s; total production of this type eventually reached 400 units.

CASA built a second factory in Cádiz in 1926 to construct a licensed copy of the German Dornier Do J Wal seaplane. They built 17 aircraft for the Spanish Air Force, 12 for the Naval Aviation branch of the Spanish Navy and two for commercial use. CASA also operated several branch facilities in Spain for the repair and overhaul of aircraft. In 1929 the CASA-1 flew - the first CASA designed aircraft. King Alfonso XIII visited the main factory in 1930. CASA also built the French Breguet 19, two of which would be made especially famous. One, was the Breguet XIX GR (Grand Raid) named the Jesus del Gran Poder, currently preserved in the Museo del Aire de Cuatro Vientos (Madrid), which flew between Seville and Bahia (in Brazil), in 1929. This aircraft was piloted by Captains Ignacio Jiménez and Francisco Iglesias and covered 6746 km in 43 hours 50 minutes. The other was the Breguet XIX Super Bidon, named Cuatro Vientos (Four Winds); it was flown by Mariano Barberán and Joaquín Collar Serra to Havana in Cuba in 1933. In 1932 CASA obtained a license from the UK aircraft company, Vickers, to build 25 Vickers Vildebeest land-based torpedo bombers, which were powered by French Hispano 600 hp engines.

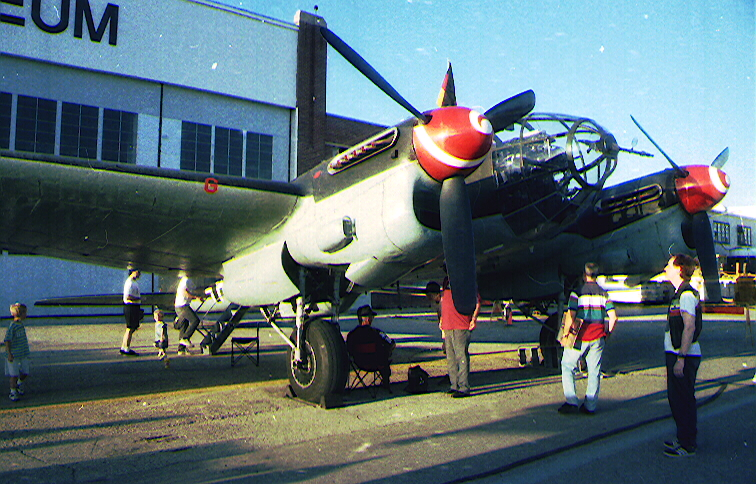
CASA 2.111 a licensed production version of the He 111-H Bomber, re-engined in Spain with imported Rolls-Royce Merlins at the end of World War II. CASA built 236 of these aircraft between 1940 and 1956

During the Spanish Civil War, the CASA Getafe factory was located in the Republican zone. It was moved to Alicante, and another opened in Sabadell. At the end of the war, production returned to Getafe. CASA manufactured the Russian Polikarpov I-15 biplane fighter, producing 287 aircraft before the end of the civil war.

After the Spanish Civil War, CASA opened a new plant in Tablada in Seville, after obtaining various aircraft licenses from Germany and built 25 Gotha Go 145A as the CASA 1145, 25 Bücker Bü 133 as the CASA 1133 and 555 Bücker Bü 131 as the CASA 1131. Production of these aircraft continued until the late 1950s. The CASA 201, is a twin-engine transport, (its engines were the Spanish-made ENMASA VAT Tigre G-125). In 1940 CASA began the licensed manufacture of 200 Heinkel He 111 twin-engine bombers with imported Rolls-Royce Merlins, as the CASA 2.111. (These are the aircraft that were used as World War Two German Luftwaffe He 111s in various movies such as Battle of Britain and Patton.)

Starting in 1943, the Spanish government began investing in CASA, first obtaining a 33 per cent share of the company, by 1992 this had increased to a controlling 99.2 per cent. In 1945 CASA opened a factory in Madrid dedicated to manufacturing the parts and sub-assemblies of their various aircraft and those that they had contracts to repair and overhaul. In 1946 CASA re-established the Projects Office and resumed the design of aircraft based on the firm's proprietary technology. In 1957 CASA won a contract from the United States Air Force for the maintenance of the F-100 Super Sabres based in Europe and Turkey and a contract from the Spanish Air Force to overhaul T-33s in the Spanish Air Force. They began the manufacture of the Northrop F-5A fighter-bomber under license in 1962. In 1971, CASA merged with Hispano Aviación.

CASA was one of the original members of the Airbus Consortium with France, Germany and the United Kingdom in 1972. In 1977, CASA was awarded the contract to design and build the C-101, a trainer and attack aircraft for the Spanish Air Force. CASA joined the Eurofighter 2000 project in 1996.

CASA has been a part of EADS, the European aerospace corporation, with Aérospatiale-Matra of France, Dornier GmbH and DASA of Germany since 1999. From then, the Spanish branch of EADS is called EADS-CASA. The current CEO and Chairman of EADS-CASA is Domingo Ureña-Raso. EADS-CASA currently employs around 7,500 workers.

EADS was formed in July, 2000 following the merger of Aerospatiale Matra of France, DaimlerChrysler Aerospace of Germany and Construcciones Aeronáuticas S.A. from Spain. It is the third largest aerospace company in the world with approximately 100,000 employees.

In July 2001 EADS-CASA Military Aircraft marked the beginning of the Eurofighter Typhoon Final Assembly Phase at Getafe. It is one of four assembly lines for the Eurofighter (the other three are at Warton in the United Kingdom, Manching in Germany and Turin in Italy). Production was expected to be up to seven Typhoon wings per month and 12 aircraft per year. EADS CASA is producing the right wing for the Eurofighter and assembling 87 aircraft for the Spanish Air Force. First delivery was realized together with the other partner air forces in the second half of 2002.

=== Military Transport Aircraft Division ===
EADS CASA's Military Transport Aircraft Division (MTAD) was based in Madrid. One of the aircraft it produces is the Airbus A330-200, which has been modified to provide air-to-air refuelling. It has provided one variant to the Royal Australian Air Force and another to the UK's Royal Air Force via the AirTanker company. MTAD's main focus is in the light to medium end of the military transport market covering three to nine tonnes.

The MTAD managed the industrial and technical activities of participating companies for the A400M project. This responsibility is now managed by Airbus Military.

== Products ==
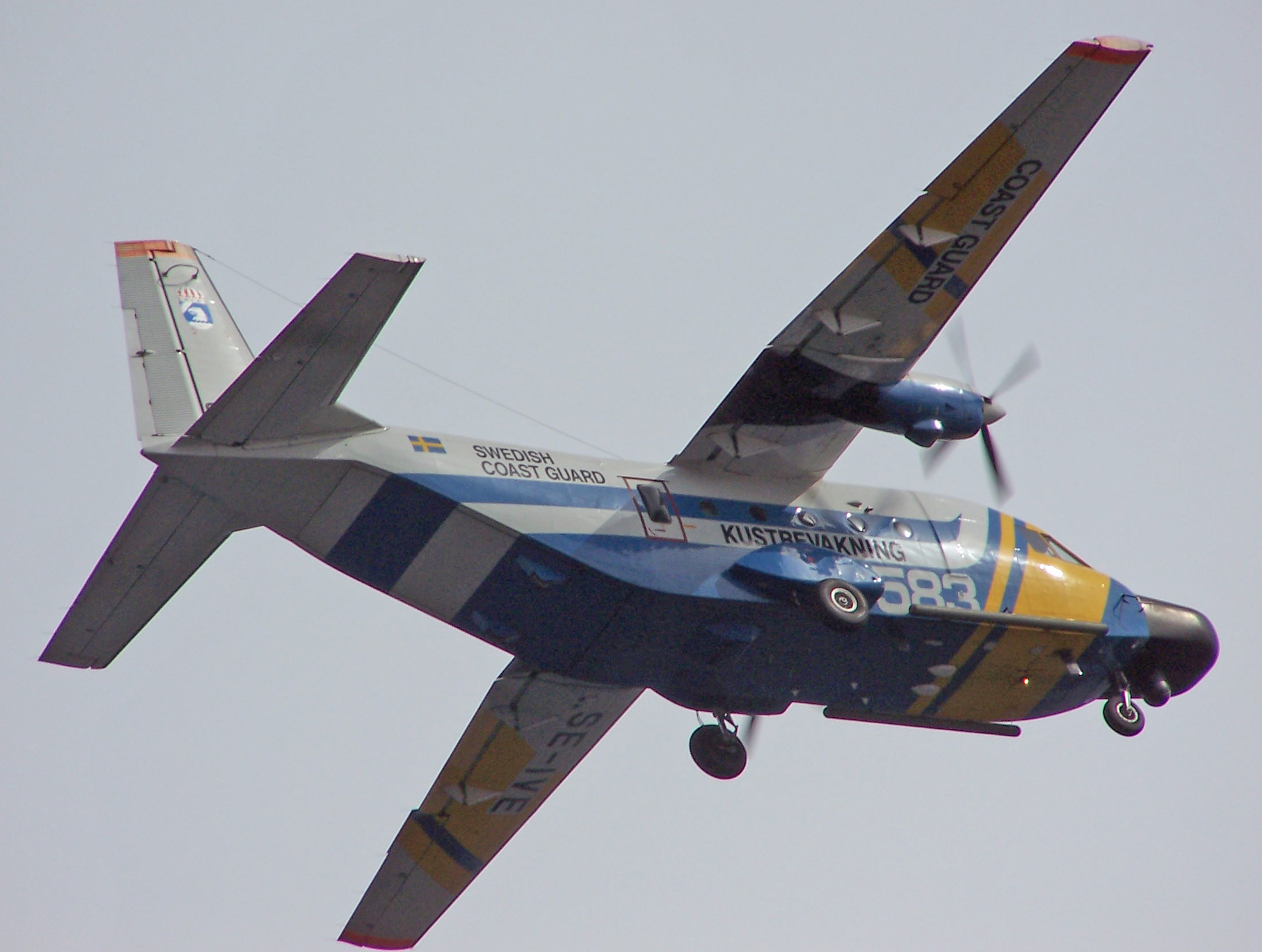
Former CASA C-212 Aviocar of the Swedish Coast Guard

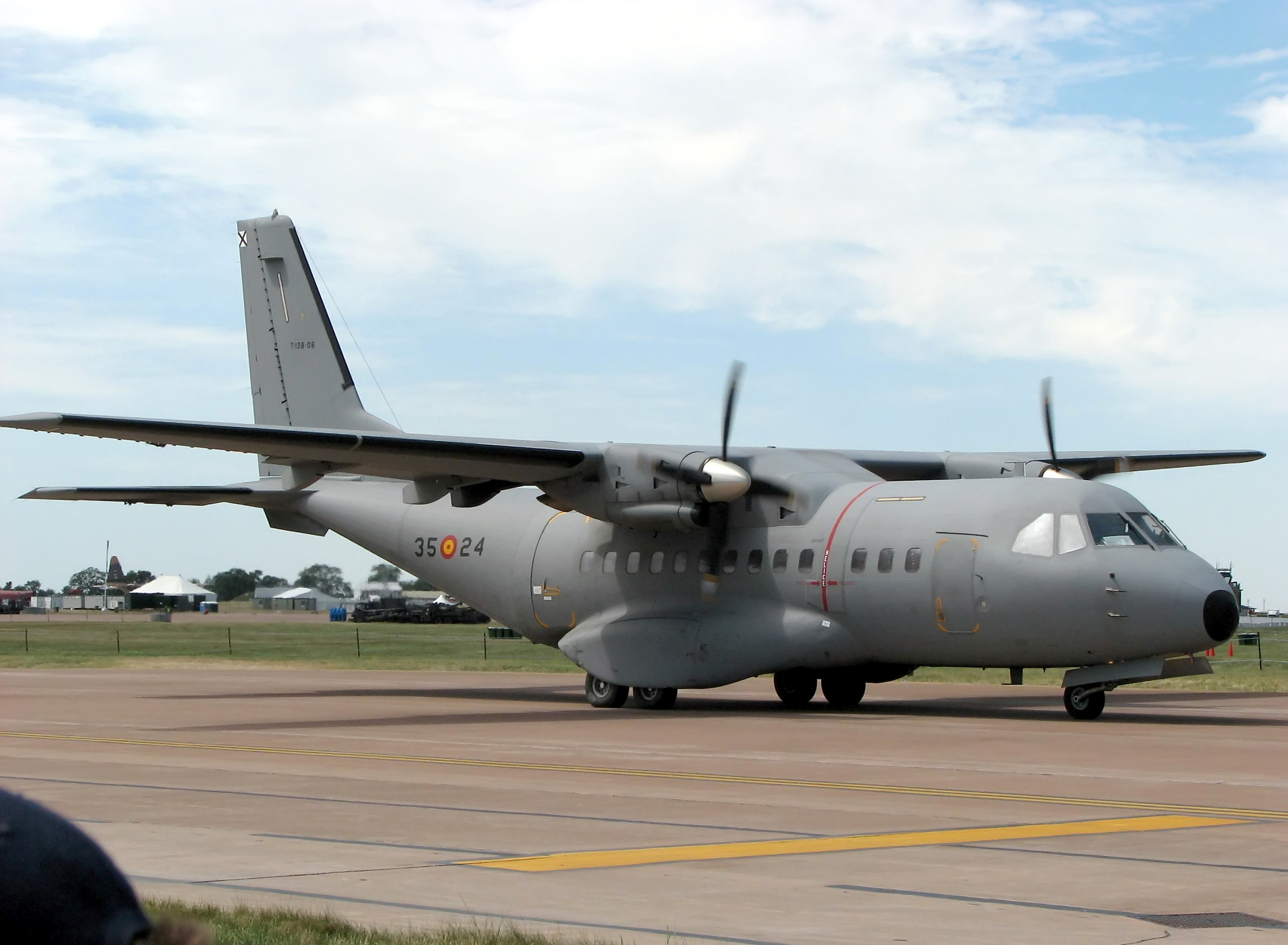
CASA CN-235M-100 of the Spanish Air Force

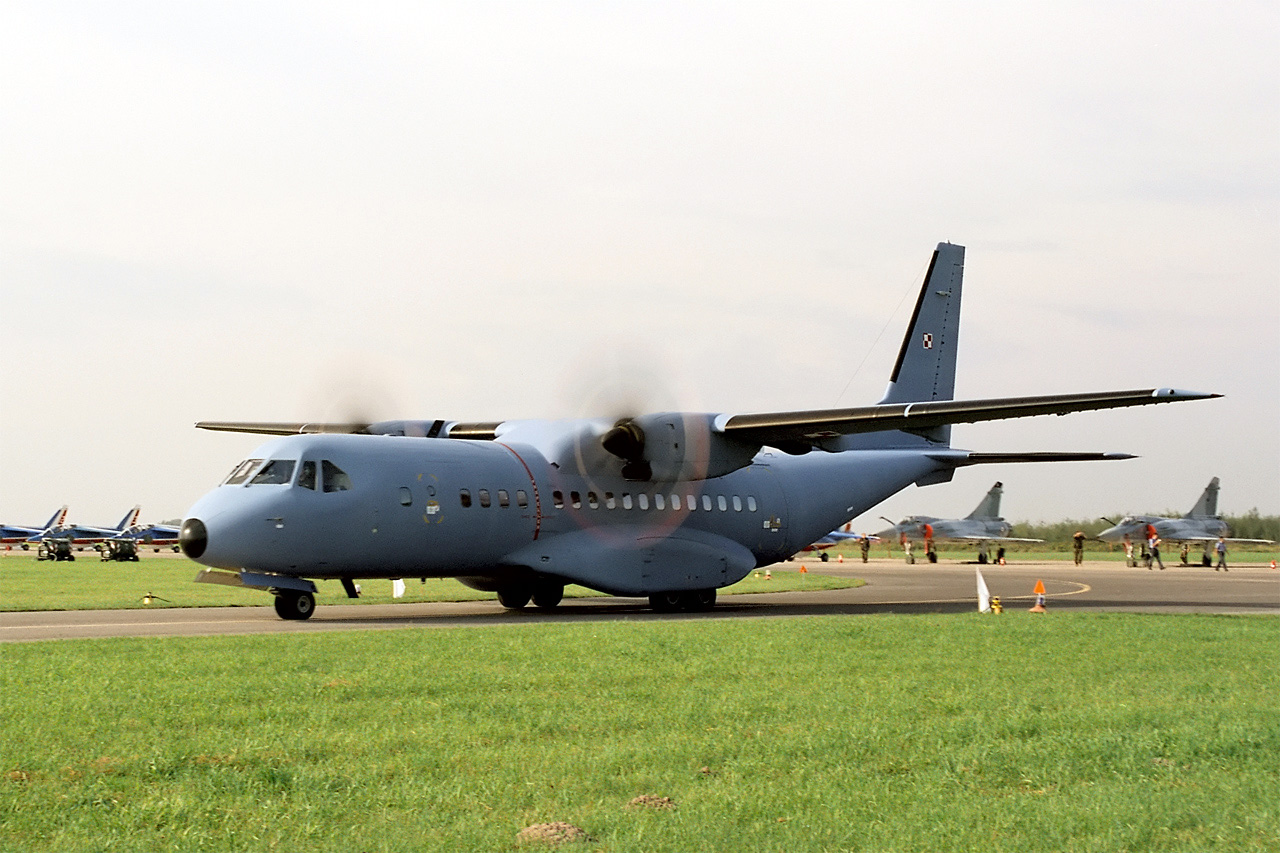
CASA C-295 of the Polish Air Force

- CASA I prototype of the CASA III
- CASA III 1929 two-seat sporting monoplane
- CASA 1.131 Jungmann license-built version of the Bücker Bü 131
- CASA 1.133 Jungmeister license-built version of the Bücker Bü 133
- CASA 2.111 license-built version of the Heinkel 111
- CASA 352 license-built version of the Junkers Ju 52
- CASA C-101 Aviojet
- CASA C-102
- CASA C-112 two-seat trainer
- CASA C.127 license-built version of the Dornier Do 27
- CASA C-201 Alcotán
- CASA C-202 Halcón
- CASA C-207 Azor
- CASA C-212 Aviocar
- CASA C-223 Flamingo license-built version of the MBB 223 Flamingo
- CASA CN-235 regional airliner and military transport.
  - EADS CASA HC-144 Ocean Sentry
- CASA C-295 regional airliner and military transport.
- Eurofighter Typhoon
- CASA SF-5A; license-built version of the Northrop F-5A
- CASA SF-5B; license-built version of the Northrop F-5B
- CASA SRF-5A; license-built version of the Northrop RF-5A
- EADS ATLANTE unmanned aerial vehicle (UAV)
- Polikarpov I-15
- Polikarpov I-16

=== Others ===
- Airbus; as subcontractor supplying parts for Airbus series of civilian passenger aircraft
- Airbus Military; Subcontractor for Airbus A400M Atlas
- Boeing; as subcontractor supplying parts for Boeing series of civilian passenger aircraft
- Eurofighter GmbH; as subcontractor for the right wing of all production Eurofighter Typhoon
