= Patrulla Águila =

Aerobatics display team of the Spanish Air and Space Force

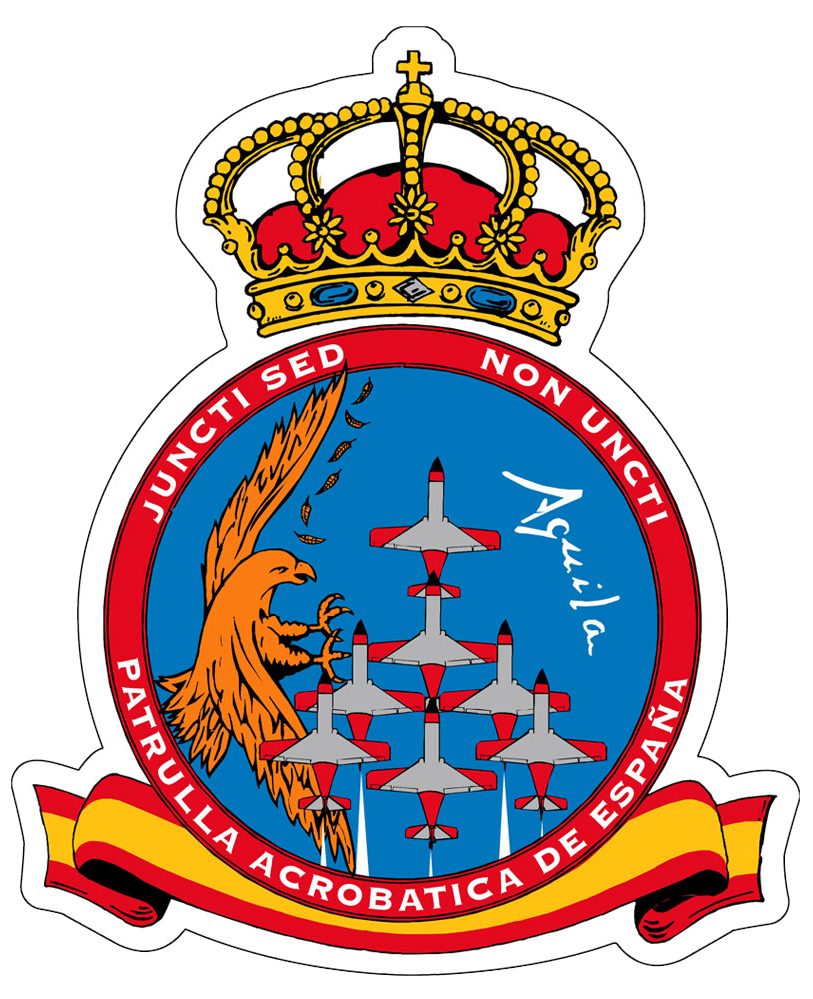
- Badge of the Patrulla Águila
- Active: 1985
- Disbanded: 2025
- Country: Spain
- Branch: Spanish Air and Space Force
- Role: Aerobatic flight demonstration team
- Garrison/HQ: San Javier Air Base
- Nickname(s): Las Águilas (The Eagles)
- Colors: Red, yellow, white

Aircraft flown
- Fighter: 12 Casa C-101 Aviojet

Patrulla Águila (Spanish for "Eagle Patrol"), formed 4 July 1985, is the former aerobatic demonstration team of the Spanish Air and Space Force (1985-2025). It is based at San Javier Air Base at the location of the academy of officers of the Spanish Air and Space Force, near Mar Menor and La Manga, in the Murcia region of Spain. Flying seven Casa C-101 Aviojets, they are the only team to use yellow smoke and are also known for their formation landings.

== History ==
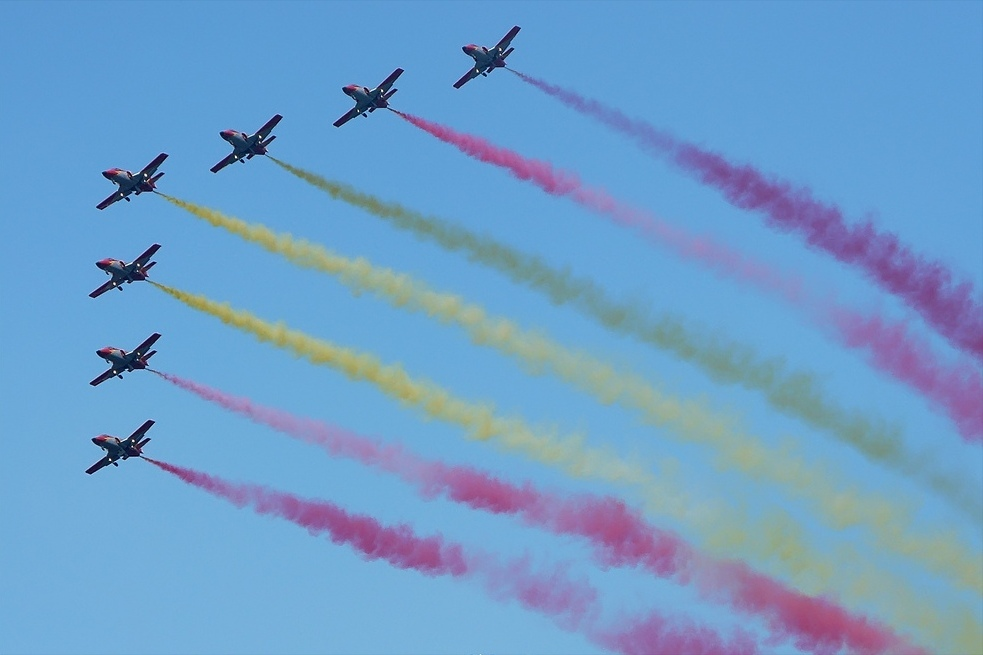
Planes of the Spanish Patrulla Águila ("Eagle Patrol") in an exhibition parade. The colors are those of the Spanish flag

During the 1950s and 1960s the Spanish aerobatic teams which preceded the creation of the Patrulla Águila were:

- Basic Air School of Matacán (Salamanca) Patrol, founded in 1954 with six T-6 Texan aircraft.
- Jet Training Air School Patrol, Talavera la Real Air Base (Badajoz), established in 1955 with T-33 Shooting Stars.
- Ascua Patrol Manises Air Base (Valencia) established in 1956 (officially in 1958 became the Patrulla Ascua) equipped with the F-86 Sabre.
- Los Llanos Air Base Patrol (Albacete) in 1980 with the Mirage F-1.

On 4 June 1985, Patrulla Águila made its first training flight from pilots were selected among the teachers of the Air Force Academy and equipped with the Casa C-101 Aviojet.

== Members of the team ==
Pilot	Position
Miguel Puertas (Granada)	Chief of the team
Ignacio Sánchez-Heredero (Madrid)	Leader
César Piquer (Valencia)	Right Point
Antonio Monge (Madrid)	Left Point
Pedro M. Monleón (Valencia)	Dog
Antonio Gutiérrez (Granada)	Solo
Moisés Roca (Murcia)	Right pair
Mariano M. Navarro (Murcia)	Left pair
Alberto Bello (Cádiz)	Reserve

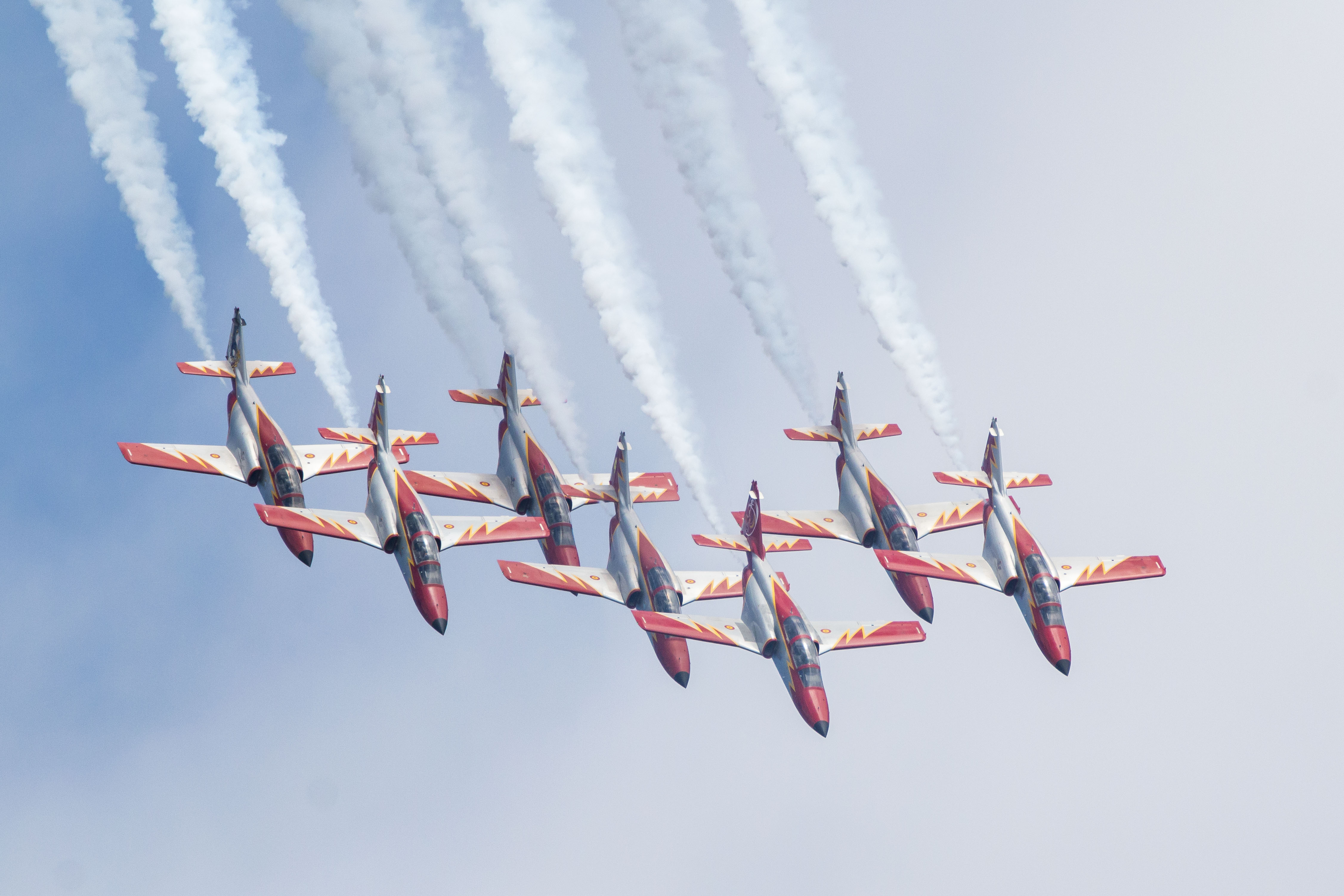
Patrulla Águila flying in formation

The team has seven pilots (plus a chief and support personnel).

- Leader or Eagle 1: in the standard formation of the team, the leader occupies the head, the other extending to the sides and behind him. The leader directs the whole team.
- Points right and left or Eagles 2 and 3 : the points go behind and on both sides of the leader.
- Dog or Eagle 4: the 'dog' flies behind the leader and of the points, forming the four one diamond.
- Solo or Eagle 5: the one in charge of the maneuvers that show off the aircraft.
- Pair right and left or Eagles 6 and 7 make up the sides of the formation. They are responsible for the maneuvers that require more precision and coordination.

== Information ==
- To mark the 25th anniversary of the Patrulla Águila Aviojet #5 was painted.
- Aviojet #5 has got stickers that say "World Champion 2010", which were given by the Netherlands Air Force, who planned to put them on their planes but finally it was Spain who won the football World Cup.

In January 2022, at the entrance to the Ciudad del Aire neighborhood, located in the Madrid town of Alcalá de Henares, a C-101 of the Patrulla Águila was installed as a tribute to Commander Eduardo Garvalena, who died in the line of duty on February 27, 2020. The plane bears the pilot's name on the fuselage and the number five on the tail.

== Incidents ==
- 27 Feb 2020: Commander Eduardo Fermín Garvalena was killed when his #5 jet crashed into the ocean near La Manga.
