= ENMASA Beta =

1950s Spanish piston aircraft engine

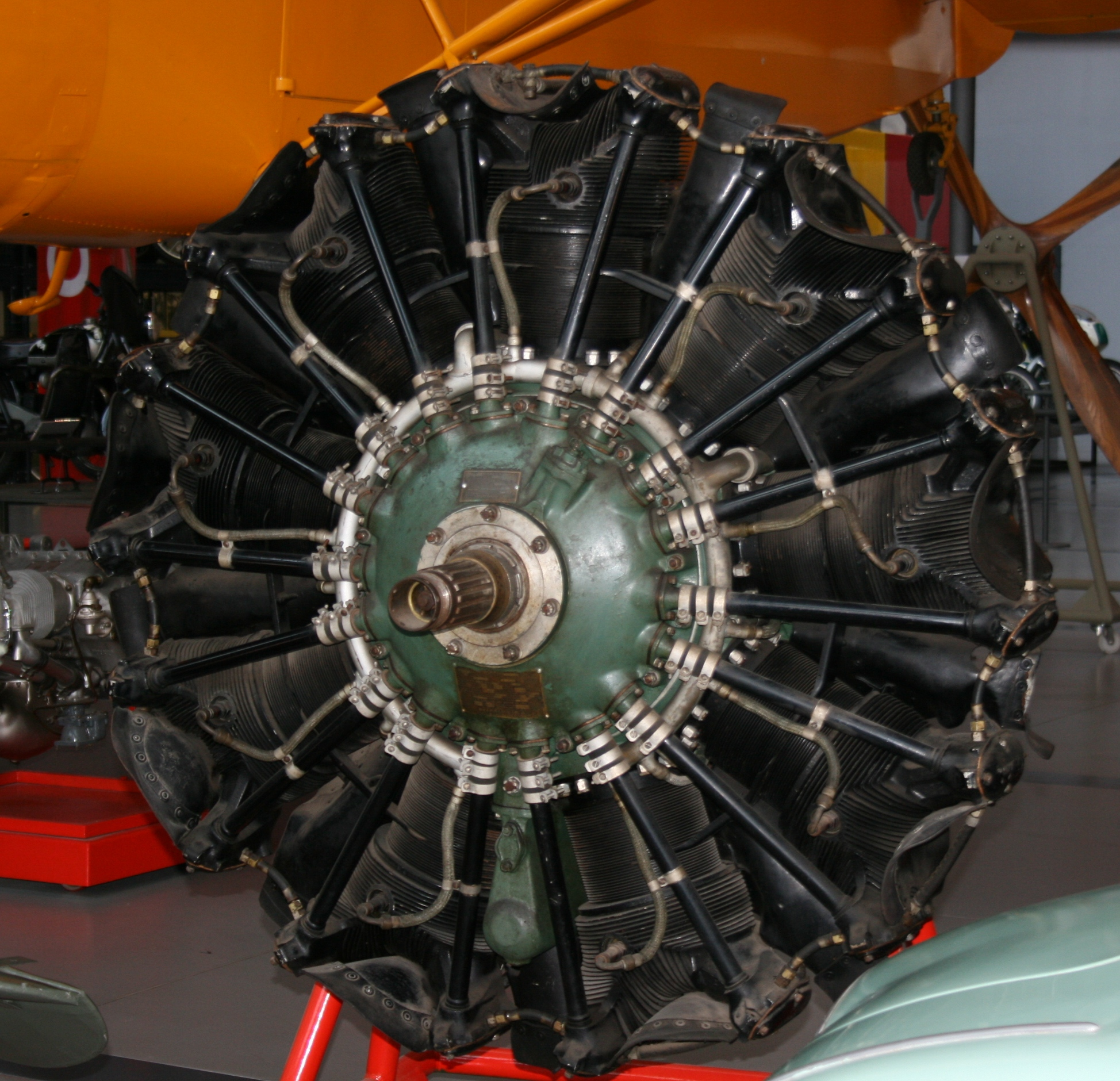
- Type: Air-cooled radial
- National origin: Spain
- Manufacturer: Empresa Nacional de Motores de Aviación S.A.

The ENMASA Beta was a Spanish air-cooled radial engine of the 1950s. A copy of the American Wright R-1820 Cyclone, the Beta was the powerplant of a number of post Spanish Civil War aircraft, including the Spanish version of the Junkers Ju 52 transport, the CASA C-202 Halcón and the Hispano HA-100 trainer.

== Specifications (Beta B-4) ==
Data from Bridgman, 1953

=== General characteristics ===
- Type: Nine-cylinder single-row air-cooled radial engine
- Bore: 155.5 mm (6.1 in)
- Stroke: 174.6 mm (6.8 in)
- Displacement: 29.85 L (1,820 in³)
- Length: 1,170 mm (46 in)
- Diameter: 1,365 mm (53.7 in)
- Dry weight: 468 kg (1,030 lb)

=== Components ===
- Valvetrain: One inlet valve and one sodium cooled exhaust valve per cylinder
- Supercharger: Centrifugal type
- Fuel system: One 4-barrel down-draught carburettor
- Fuel type: 87 octane minimum
- Cooling system: Air-cooled

=== Performance ===
- Power output: 578 kW (775 hp) at 2,200 rpm (take-off power)

== See also ==
Related development

- Wright R-1820

Related lists

- List of aircraft engines

== Bibliography ==
- Bridgman, Leonard (1953). Jane's All The World's Aircraft 1953–54. London: Jane's.
