= Hispano HS-42 =

Spanish military trainer aircraft

HS-42 and HA-43

General information
- Type: Military trainer
- National origin: Spain
- Manufacturer: Hispano-Suiza/Hispano Aviación
- Primary user: Spanish Air Force
- Number built: >100

History
- Manufactured: 1942–1948
- First flight: 1942

The Hispano HS-42 and its derivative, the HA-43, were advanced military trainer aircraft produced in Spain in the 1940s. The basic design was that of a conventional, low-wing, cantilever monoplane with seating for the pilot and instructor in tandem. The HS-42 had fixed, tailwheel undercarriage with spatted mainwheels, while the HA-43 had retractable main units. Produced on the assembly line that had been used to build Fokker D.XXI fighters, the HS-42 shared some components with this aircraft.

== Variants ==
HS-42
Original production version with fixed undercarriage and Piaggio Stella P.VII C.16 engine
HA-43
Improved variant with retractable undercarriage and Armstrong Siddeley Cheetah 27 engine

== Operators ==
Spain

- Spanish Air Force

== Specifications (HA-43) ==
Data from Jane's All The World's Aircraft 1953-54

General characteristics

- Crew: 2
- Length: 7.95 m (26 ft 1 in)
- Wingspan: 10.00 m (32 ft 10 in)
- Height: 2.60 m (8 ft 6 in)
- Wing area: 16.3 m^{2} (175 sq ft)
- Aspect ratio: 6.13:1
- Empty weight: 1,504 kg (3,316 lb)
- Gross weight: 2,050 kg (4,519 lb)
- Fuel capacity: 400 L (110 US gal; 88 imp gal)
- Powerplant: 1 × Armstrong Siddeley Cheetah 27 seven-cylinder radial engine, 290 kW (390 hp)
- Propellers: 2-bladed Rotol wooden variable-pitch propeller, 2.84 m (9 ft 4 in) diameter

Performance

- Maximum speed: 335 km/h (208 mph, 181 kn)
- Cruise speed: 295 km/h (183 mph, 159 kn)
- Stall speed: 118 km/h (73 mph, 64 kn) (flaps down)
- Range: 1,200 km (750 mi, 650 nmi)
- Endurance: 4 hr 15 min
- Service ceiling: 6,000 m (20,000 ft)
- Rate of climb: 7.2 m/s (1,410 ft/min)

Armament

- Guns: 2 × fixed, forward-firing 7.7 mm Breda-SAFAT machine guns in wings
