= CASA C-201 Alcotán =

Spanish military transport aircraft

C-201 Alcotán
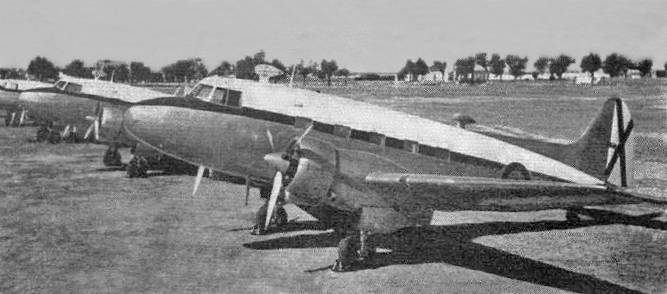

General information
- Type: Military transport
- National origin: Spain
- Manufacturer: CASA
- Primary user: Spanish Air Force
- Number built: 11

History
- First flight: 11 February 1949

The CASA C-201 Alcotán ("Kestrel") was a 1950s transport aircraft, built by CASA for the Spanish Air Force.

== Design and development ==
The C-201 was the result of an agreement between the Spanish government and manufacturer Construcciones Aeronáuticas SA (CASA), to develop a transport aircraft for the air force capable of carrying a payload of one tonne over a range of 1,000 km (620 mi). The design was a twin-engine low-wing cantilever monoplane of conventional configuration. The main units of the tailwheel undercarriage retracted into the engine nacelles.

== Operational history ==
Two prototypes were constructed, and the first of those first flew on 11 February 1949. An order for twelve pre-production aircraft and one hundred series aircraft was then placed. The pre-production machines were planned to demonstrate a range of different equipment fits for the airframe, enabling it for a variety of roles including personnel transport, training for bombing and photo-reconnaissance work, and instrument flying training. A number of engines were also to be evaluated, including the Armstrong Siddeley Cheetah that had powered the prototypes, the Pratt & Whitney R-1340, and the locally produced ENMASA Sirio.

The Alcotán project stalled, due to problems in the supply of powerplants and propellers. Spain's domestic engine industry was not capable of producing powerplants in sufficient quantity for the project, and Spain was unable to afford to import foreign engines. The production run had been scheduled to be completed before 1955, but the shortage of engines meant that by 1956, only eleven complete aircraft had been finished and delivered. In 1962, the project was finally cancelled, without the engine problem ever having been resolved. By then, CASA had 96 complete airframes in storage awaiting powerplants. Those were scrapped, and the Spanish government compensated the manufacturer for the debacle.

== Variants ==
- C-201A - personnel transport with Armstrong Siddeley Cheetah engines
- C-201B - personnel transport with ENMASA Sirio engines
- C-201D - instrument flying, navigation, and radio training version with Armstrong Siddeley Cheetah engines
- C-201E - bombing and photo-reconnaissance training version with Armstrong Siddeley Cheetah engines
- C-201F - instrument flying, navigation, and radio training version with ENMASA Sirio engines
- C-201G - bombing and photo-reconnaissance training version with ENMASA Sirio engines

== Operators ==
Spain

- Spanish Air Force

== Specifications (C-201A) ==
Data from Jane's All The World's Aircraft 1953–54

General characteristics

- Crew: 2 pilots
- Capacity: 10 passengers
- Length: 13.80 m (45 ft 3 in)
- Wingspan: 18.40 m (60 ft 4 in)
- Height: 3.85 m (12 ft 8 in)
- Wing area: 41.80 m^{2} (449.9 sq ft)
- Empty weight: 3,560 kg (7,848 lb)
- Gross weight: 5,100 kg (11,244 lb)
- Powerplant: 2 × Armstrong Siddeley Cheetah XXVII seven-cylinder radial engine, 354 kW (475 hp) each

Performance

- Maximum speed: 325 km/h (202 mph, 175 kn)
- Range: 1,000 km (620 mi, 540 nmi)
- Endurance: 4 hr
- Service ceiling: 5,600 m (18,400 ft)

== See also ==
Related development

- CASA C-202 Halcón
- CASA C-207 Azor

== Bibliography ==
- Bridgman, Leonard (1953). Jane's All The World's Aircraft 1953–54. London: Jane's All The World's Aircraft Publishing Co.
- Taylor, Michael J. H. (1989). Jane's Encyclopedia of Aviation. London: Studio Editions. p. 238.
- World Aircraft Information Files. London: Bright Star Publishing. pp. File 891 Sheet 12.
