= Lockheed Saturn =

Small commercial aircraft

Model 75 Saturn
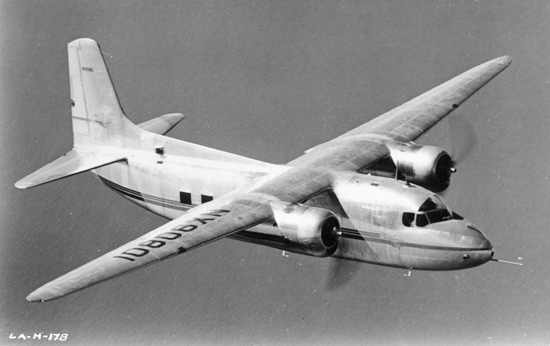

General information
- Type: Airliner
- National origin: United States
- Manufacturer: Lockheed Corporation
- Status: Scrapped
- Number built: 2

History
- First flight: June 17, 1946

The Lockheed Model 75 Saturn was a small, short-route commercial aircraft produced by the Lockheed Corporation in the mid-1940s. Lockheed announced the project on November 19, 1944. The design team, led by Don Palmer, created a high-wing, twin-engine monoplane with 14 seats and a top speed of 228 mph (367 km/h). Lockheed touted the Saturn's capability to take on passengers and cargo without ramps or stairs, making it suitable for small-town airports with limited facilities.

Tony LeVier piloted the first flight on June 17, 1946. Lockheed had received 500 conditional orders for this aircraft, priced at $85,000 each. But, by the time the design was completed, the selling price had risen to $100,000 and these orders had been cancelled, with war surplus C-47s filling the same market at a quarter the price. Lockheed lost $6 million from the development of the two prototypes, which were scrapped in 1948.

== Specifications ==
Data from Francillon, p. 281

General characteristics

- Crew: Two
- Capacity: 14 passengers
- Length: 56 ft 6 in (15.69 m)
- Wingspan: 74 ft 0 in (22.56 m)
- Height: 19 ft 10 in (6.05 m)
- Wing area: 502 sq ft (46.6 m^{2})
- Empty weight: 11,361 lb (5,153 kg)
- Gross weight: 16,000 lb (7,257 kg)
- Powerplant: 2 × Wright 744C-7BA-1 seven cylinder radial engine, 700 hp (522 kW) each

Performance

- Maximum speed: 198 kn (228 mph, 367 km/h) at sea level
- Cruise speed: 163 kn (187 mph, 301 km/h)
- Range: 522 nmi (600 mi, 965 km)
- Service ceiling: 26,500 ft (8,075 m)
- Rate of climb: 1,325 ft/min (6.7 m/s)
