= Wright R-1300 Cyclone 7 =

R-1300
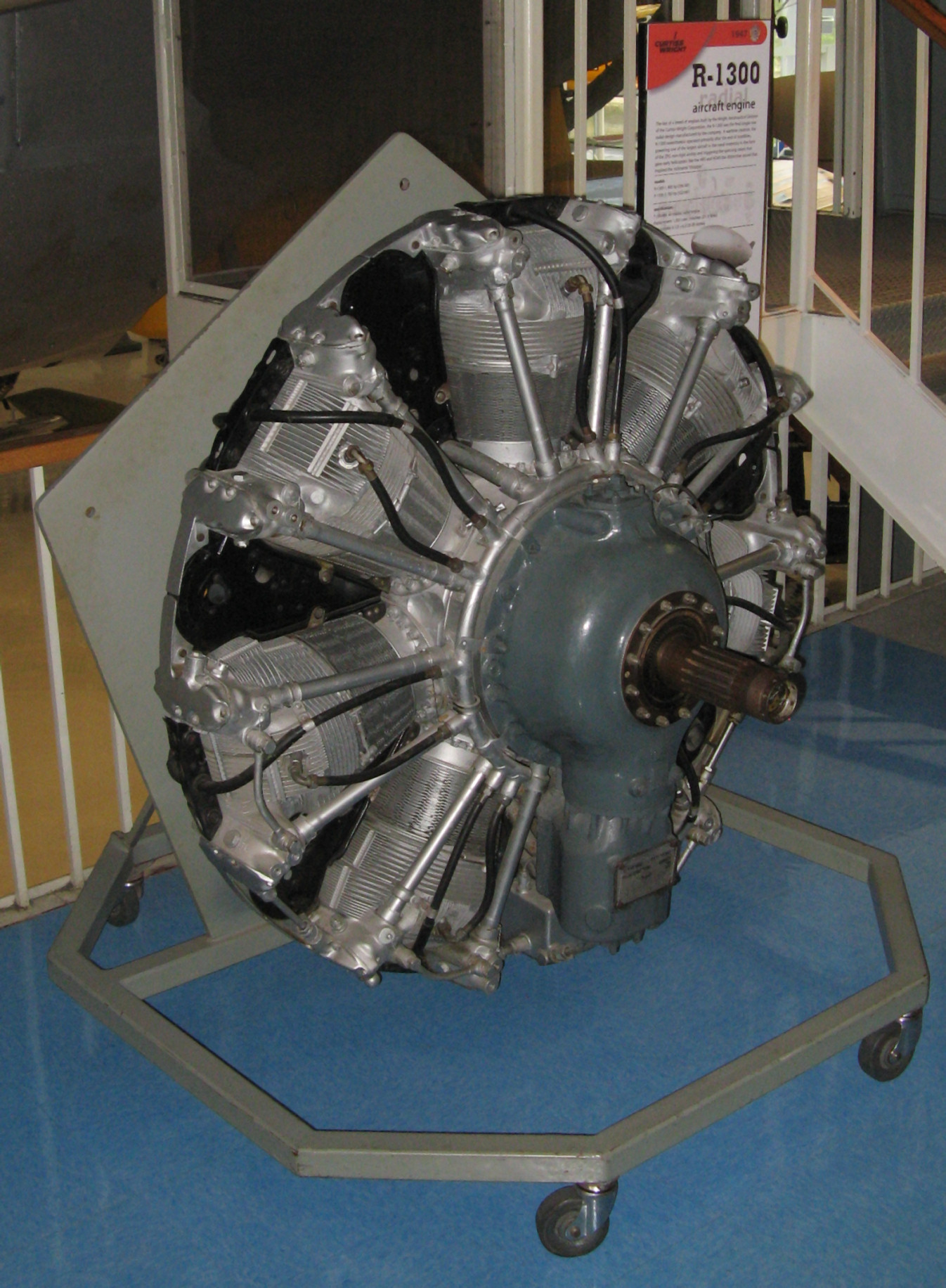
- Type: Radial engine
- National origin: United States
- Manufacturer: Wright Aeronautical
- First run: 1942
- Major applications: North American T-28 Trojan
- Number built: 3,545
- Developed from: Wright R-2600

The Wright R-1300 Cyclone 7 is an American air-cooled seven-cylinder supercharged radial aircraft engine produced by Curtiss-Wright.

== Design and development ==
The R-1300 is basically a single row Wright R-2600. The engine was mass-produced but not widely used. Engineering began in 1942 but the first flight of an R-1300 did not take place until 1949. The engine was produced under license by Kaiser-Frazer and later by AVCO Lycoming.

The engine was used in combat — the R-1300-1A and -1B in the A model North American T-28 Trojan and the R-1300-3, -3A, -3C and -3D in the Sikorsky H-19 Chickasaw. The R-1300-1B was used to power the Ayres Thrush. The R-1300-4 and -4A were used in the N class blimp; 50 of these variants were produced by AVCO.

Early-production engines had vibration problems, an improved lateral dampener in the crank brought about most of the model changes.

== Variants ==
R-1300-1A
R-1300-2
A direct drive version of the R-1300-1. It had a 0.5625:1 reduction drive. Both used the PD9F1 carburetor.
R-1300-2A
R-1300-3
Derated to 690.3 hp (515 kW), uses forced-air cooling fan and uses a PD9G1 carburetor.
R-1300-4
Similar to the R-1300-1, uses some different accessory components.
R-1300-CB7A1
With reduction gear for use on fixed wing aircraft.

== Applications ==
- Hispano HA-100
- Lockheed Saturn
- N class blimp
- North American T-28 Trojan
- Rockwell Thrush Commander
- Sikorsky H-19
- Westland Whirlwind

== Specifications (R-1300-1A) ==
Data from Type Certificate Data Sheet 5E-14.

=== General characteristics ===
- Type: 7-cylinder supercharged air-cooled single row radial engine
- Bore: 6.125 in (155.6 mm)
- Stroke: 6.312 in (160.3 mm)
- Displacement: 1,301 cu in (21.32 L)
- Length: 48.22 in (1,225 mm)
- Diameter: 55 in (1,397 mm)
- Dry weight: 1,055 lb (478 kg)

=== Components ===
- Valvetrain: Two pushrod-actuated valves per cylinder with sodium-cooled exhaust valve
- Supercharger: 1-stage
- Fuel system: Bendix-Stromberg PD9F1 downdraft carburetor with automatic mixture control
- Cooling system: Air-cooled

=== Performance ===
- Power output: 800 hp (596 kW)
- Specific power: 0.61 hp/in³ (27.94 kW/L)
- Compression ratio: 6.20:1
- Power-to-weight ratio: 0.76hp/lb (1.25 kW/kg)

== See also ==
Related development

- Wright Cyclone series
- Wright R-1820 Cyclone 9
- Wright R-2600 Twin Cyclone
- Wright R-3350 Duplex Cyclone

Related lists

- List of aircraft engines
