= CASA 2.111 =

Spanish medium bomber

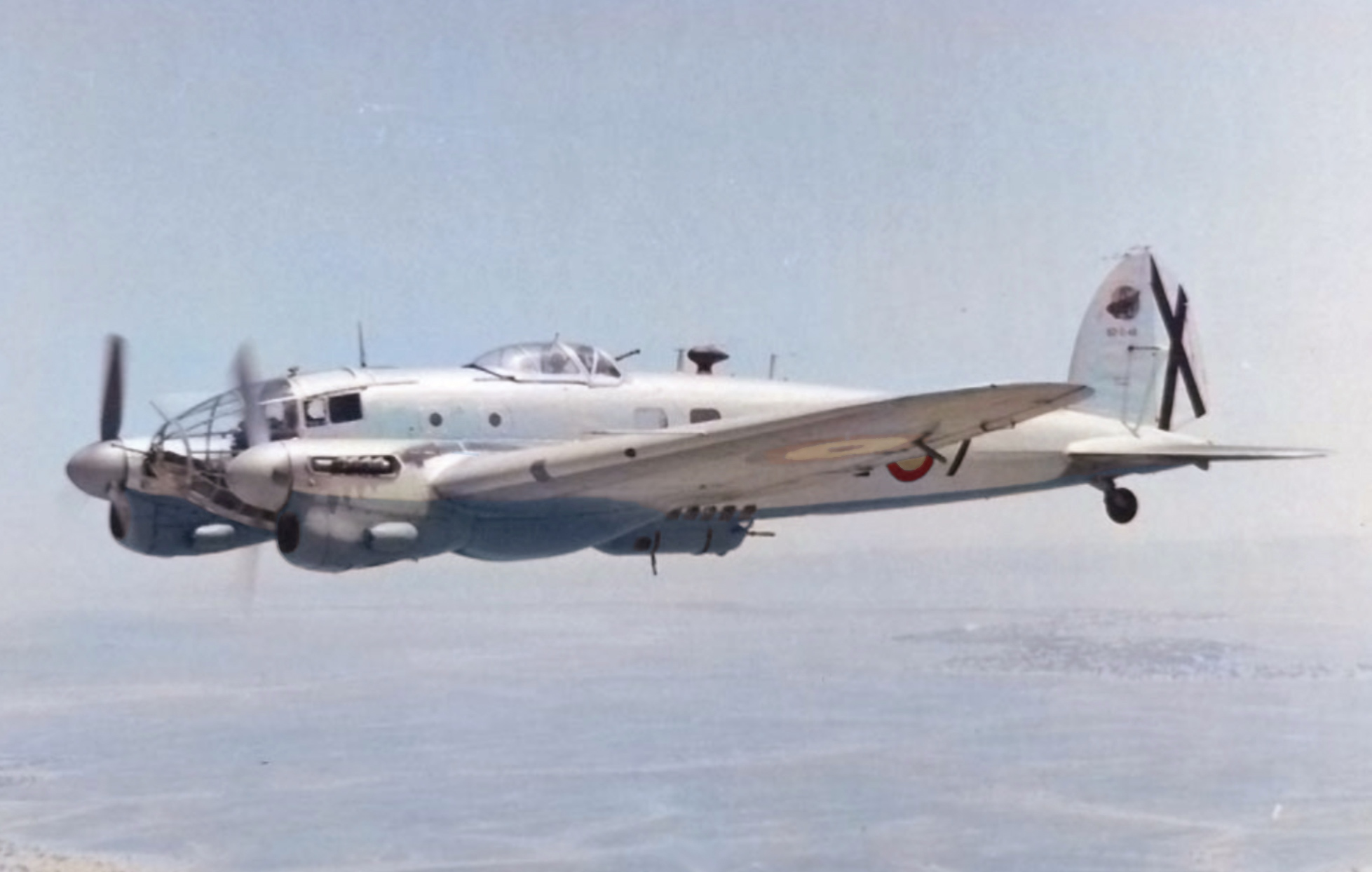
- CASA 2.111B

General information
- Type: Medium bomber
- Manufacturer: CASA
- Primary user: Spanish Air Force
- Number built: 236

History
- Manufactured: 1945–1956
- First flight: 23 May 1945
- Retired: 1973
- Developed from: Heinkel He 111

The CASA 2.111 is a medium bomber derived from the Heinkel He 111 and produced in Spain under licence by Construcciones Aeronáuticas SA (CASA). The 2.111 models differed significantly in details from Heinkel's wartime He 111H design while using essentially the same airframe in appearance, featuring heavier armament and eventually Rolls-Royce Merlin engines.

== Design and development ==
In 1937, during the Spanish Civil War, the Spanish Nationalist Air Force received a number of He 111Bs from Germany, which had begun to receive the improved He 111D model, receiving He 111Es following the end of the war. There was a need for more modern aircraft, however, so in 1940, CASA negotiated a contract with Heinkel to produce 200 examples of the newer He 111 H-16 in Seville.

Setting up production was slow, with relatively little support received from Germany as World War II continued. Spain managed to locate a store of Jumo 211F-2 engines in France, and this allowed completion of 130 Jumo powered examples (although only 117 were delivered owing to the need to cannibalise engines). These were in three versions: the 2.111A, a medium bomber; the 2.111C, a reconnaissance bomber; and the 2.111F, a dual-control trainer.

== Operational history ==
The first Spanish-built aircraft flew on 23 May 1945. Following the end of the war, access to new German-built Junkers engines and parts became impossible, and CASA found an alternative with the Rolls-Royce Merlin 500. In April 1956, 173 Merlin engines were ordered and installed on the aircraft in a "power plant" nacelle of a type originally developed by Rolls-Royce for the Beaufighter II and later used on the Avro Lancaster. The newly Merlin-powered bombers and reconnaissance bombers became the 2.111B and 2.111D, respectively; some were re-engined, while others were built new. A nine-passenger transport, the 2.111T8, was also developed and produced. Spanish 2.111s served into the late 1960s and, in the case of the transports, early 1970s. Many of the aircraft retired in the 1960s.

The CASA 2.111 was used in combat in the close air support role during the Ifni War in 1957–1958.

== Variants ==
2.111A
Licensed He 111H-16 with Junkers Jumo 211 engines

2.111B
Engines replaced by Rolls-Royce Merlin Series 500-29 engines

2.111C
Reconnaissance variant

2.111D
Reconnaissance variant with Merlin engines

2.111E
Transport variant

2.111F
Trainer aircraft

== Accidents and incidents ==
One modified Spanish 2.111D served as a transport for Spanish VIPs, including Generalissimo Francisco Franco, before being purchased in England by the Confederate Air Force in 1977. It remained the last He 111 in flyable condition until 10 July 2003, when it was destroyed in a fatal crash landing. The aircraft was attempting a landing at the Cheyenne Municipal Airport, near Cheyenne, Wyoming, while en route from Midland, Texas to an air show in Missoula, Montana. Eyewitness reports indicate the aircraft lost power to one engine on final approach and ploughed through a chain link fence before colliding with a building under construction. Killed were CAF pilot Neil R. Stamp and co-pilot Charles S. Bates.

== Surviving aircraft ==
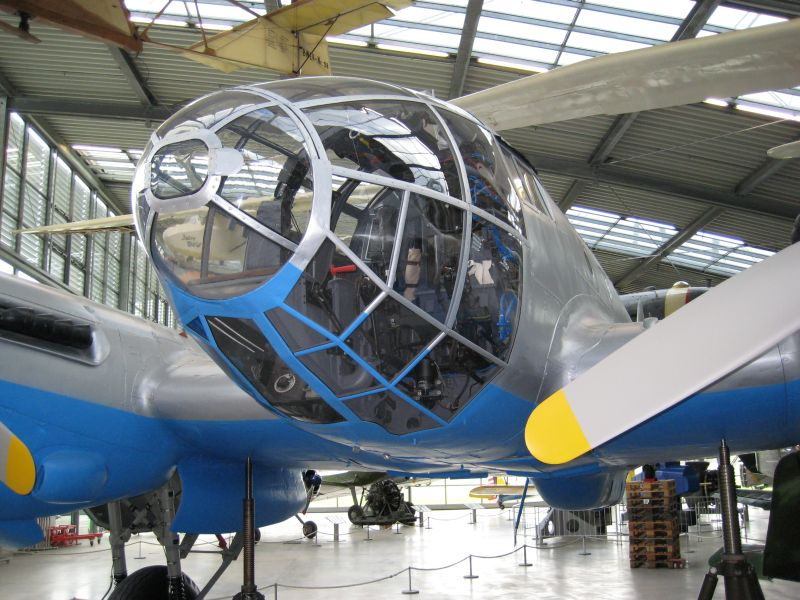
CASA 2.111B Cockpit at the Deutsches Museum Flugwerft Schleissheim

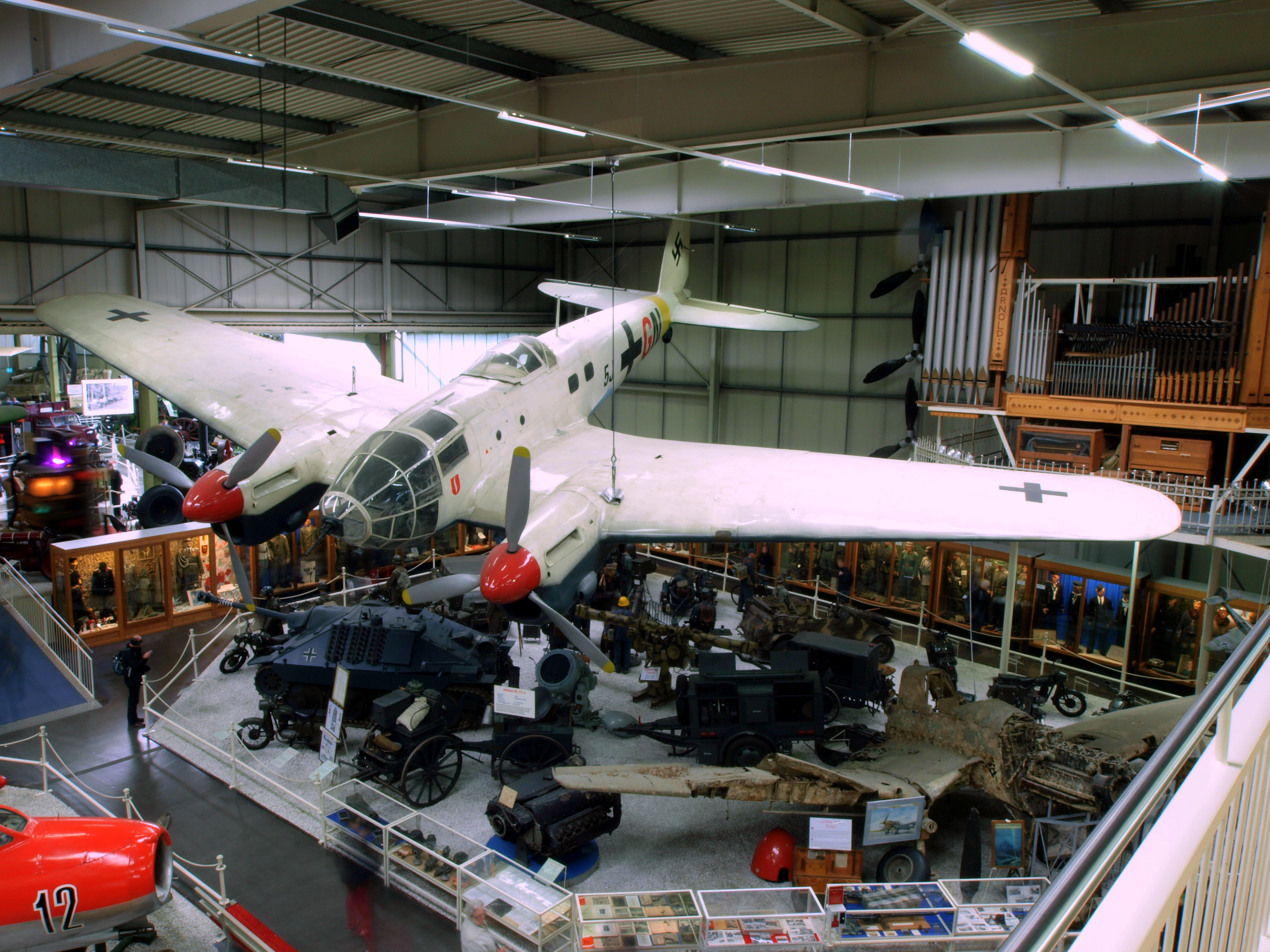
CASA 2.111B at the Technik Museum Sinsheim

- B.2I-27 – 2.111E in storage at the Cavanaugh Flight Museum in Addison, Texas. Removed from public display when the museum indefinitely closed on 1 January 2024. To be moved to North Texas Regional Airport in Denison, Texas.
- B.2I-29 – 2.111D in storage at the National Museum of the United States Air Force in Dayton, Ohio.
- B.2I-39 – 2.111B in storage at the Flying Heritage & Combat Armor Museum in Everett, Washington.
- B.2I-77 – 2.111B on display at the Flugwerft Schleissheim branch of the Deutsches Museum in Oberschleißheim, Bavaria.
- B.2I-82 – 2.111B on static display at the Technik Museum Sinsheim in Sinsheim, Baden-Württemberg.
- B.2I-97 – 2.111E on display at the Museo del Aire in Madrid.
- B.2I-103 – 2.111B under restoration at the Kent Battle of Britain Museum in Hawkinge, Kent.
- B.2I-117 – 2.111B on display at the Militärhistorisches Museum Flugplatz Berlin-Gatow in Gatow, Berlin.
- BR.2I-14 – 2.111D on display at Flugausstellung Peter Junior in Hermeskeil, Rhineland-Palatinate.
- BR.2I-37 – 2.111D in storage in Duxford, Cambridgeshire for the Flying Heritage & Combat Armor Museum.
- BR.2I-129 – 2.111D on display at the Musée de l’air et de l’espace in Le Bourget, Île-de-France.
- Composite – Composite in storage in Austria. It is made up of the forward fuselage and center section of 2.111B, serial number B.2I-20, and the wreckage of He 111 H-16, werk nummer 2117.

== Specifications (2.111B) ==
General characteristics

- Crew: 5
- Length: 16.4 m (53 ft 10 in)
- Wingspan: 22.5 m (73 ft 10 in)
- Height: 3.9 m (12 ft 10 in)
- Wing area: 86.5 m^{2} (931 sq ft)
- Max takeoff weight: 14,000 kg (30,865 lb)
- Powerplant: 2 × Rolls-Royce Merlin 500-29 V-12 liquid-cooled piston engines, 1,176 kW (1,577 hp) each

Performance

- Maximum speed: 440 km/h (270 mph, 240 kn)
- Range: 1,950 km (1,210 mi, 1,050 nmi)
- Service ceiling: 7,800 m (25,600 ft)

Armament

- Guns: 1 x 12.7mm Breda SAFAT & 2 x 7.92mm MG-15
- Bombs: 8 x 250 kg or 32 x 8 kg or 28 x 10 kg

== Aircraft in film ==
Due to their close resemblance to the He 111s they were developed from, CASA 2.111s were sometimes used to represent their German counterparts in films. They were used in this way in films such as Battle of Britain and Patton. Often accompanying it in these films were Hispano Aviación HA-1112 fighters, which represented the Messerschmitt Bf 109.

== See also ==
Related development

- Heinkel He 111

Aircraft of comparable role, configuration, and era

- Bristol Brigand
- Douglas A-26 Invader
- SNCAO CAO.600
