= Hispano Aviación =

Spanish aircraft manufacturer

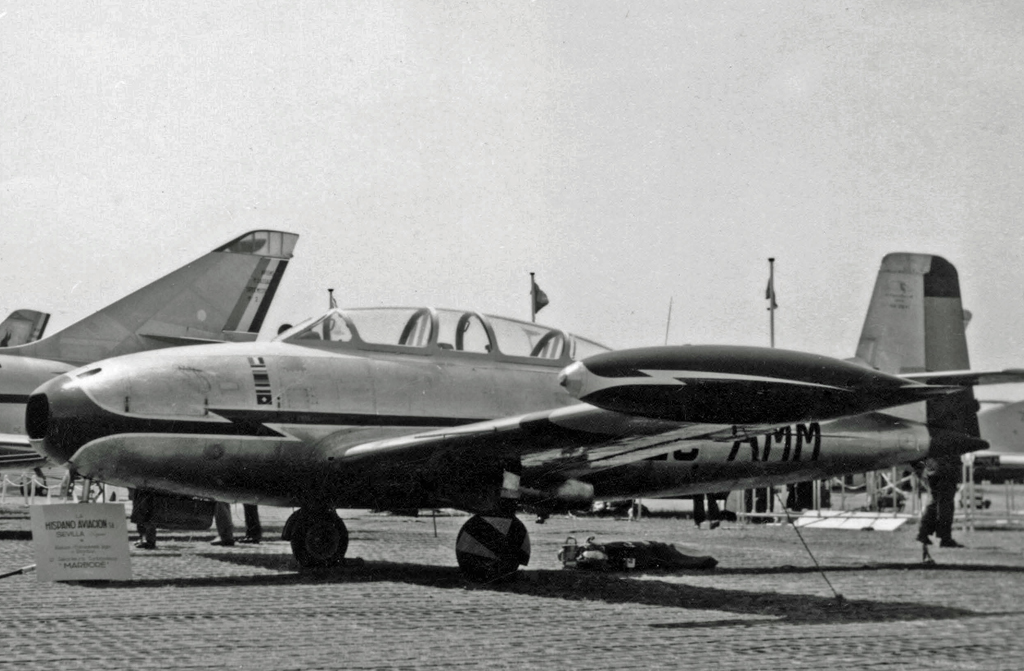
The prototype Hispano HA-200 Saeta exhibited at the 1957 Paris Air Show

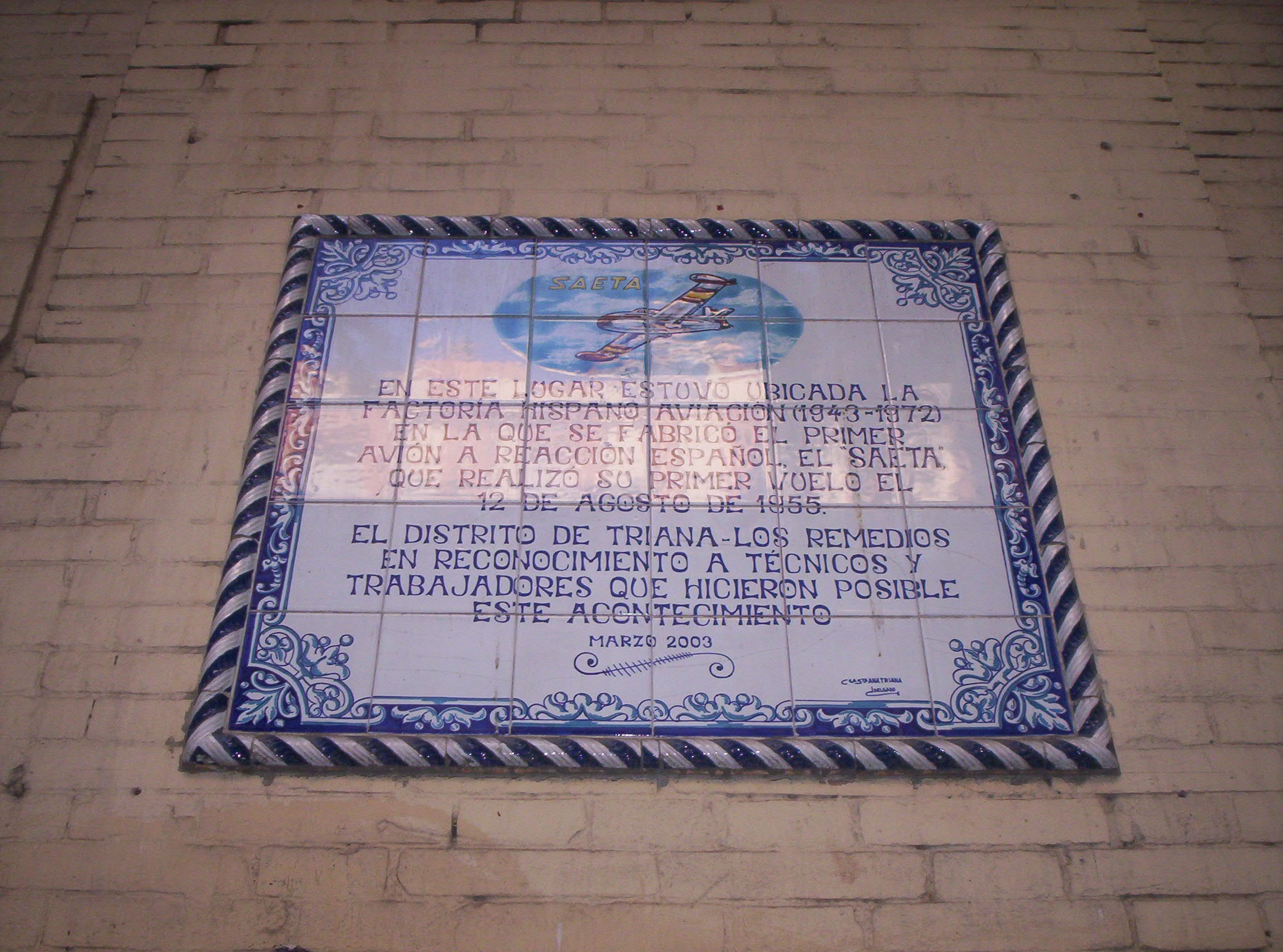
Tiles on the wall of the former Hispano Aviación factory

Hispano Aviación was a Hispano-Suiza aircraft factory in Andalusia, southern Spain which became a separate enterprise when taken over by the Francisco Franco led Nationalist forces in 1939, during the Spanish Civil War.

Located in Tablada, in the Triana district of Seville, the Hispano factory produced several aircraft designs, including the HA-1109 also named Me-109J, Spanish licence built version of the famous Messerschmitt Bf 109G equipped with a 1,300 hp Hispano-Suiza 12Z engine, HA-1112 (HA-1109 re-engined with Rolls-Royce Merlin), Hispano HA-100 Triana; the Hispano HA-200 Saeta jet trainer and light attack aircraft designed by Professor Willy Messerschmitt.

Hispano Aviación was taken over by Construcciones Aeronáuticas SA (CASA) in 1972, which is now part of Airbus.

== Bibliography ==
- Green, William (1955). The Aircraft of the World. Macdonald & Co Publishers Ltd.
