= Pashinin I-21 =

I-21

General information
- Type: Fighter
- Manufacturer: Pashinin OKB
- Designer: Mikhail M. Pashinin
- Status: Cancelled
- Number built: 3

History
- Manufactured: 1940-1941
- First flight: 18 May 1940

The Pashinin I-21 (not to be confused with the Ilyushin TsKB-32, also known as "I-21") was an early 1940s Soviet fighter prototype. Designed by Mikhail M. Pashinin, the I-21 was built to incorporate lessons learned from the combat experiences of Soviet pilots during the Spanish Civil War and the Nomonhan Incident with the Empire of Japan. Despite showing promising performance, the I-21 did not get past the prototype stage, as it was felt the type did not offer a significant enough increase in capability over competitors already in production, such as the Yakovlev Yak-1 or Mikoyan Gurevich MiG-3.

== Development ==
Mikhail Pashinin began development of his monoplane fighter in early 1939. A former employee of N. N. Polikarpov, Pashinin envisioned the I-21 as a replacement for the increasingly obsolescent I-16 in Soviet service. The resulting I-21 featured a low set wing with retractable undercarriage, a Klimov M-107 engine, and a framed canopy with good visibility. The I-21 was of mixed construction, as was typical of many contemporary designs, and had a monocoque rear fuselage made of wood, whereas the forward fuselage was built from welded steel tubing for increased rigidity. Wings were of metal with plywood covering.

The cockpit was placed well aft, behind the wing, and the pilot was seated under a swinging canopy. The I-21's armament consisted of an engine mounted 20 millimeter ShVAK automatic cannon and two 7.62 millimeter ShKAS machine guns, one in each wing. This armament was typical of other Soviet fighters of the period such as the Yak-1. The 20mm ShVAK was later replaced by a harder-hitting 23mm BT-23 cannon. (This gun developed by Jacob Taubin (Яков Таубин) and M. Baburin (М.Н. Бабурин) and is also known under the designation MP-6.)

The prototypes were ultimately powered by Klimov M-105P engines, since the M-107 had run into development troubles of its own, and production of the engine was delayed. Flight testing with the 1,050-hp M-105 began with the first flight on 18 May 1940. Official testing by Soviet authorities was conducted from 6 June, in test pilots discovered that the I-21 had stability problems. As a result, Pashinin made modifications to the second prototype, consisting of new outer wing panels with tapered leading and trailing edges to improve stability. Although an improvement, the I-21 still was not performing as expected, despite some promising speeds of over 480 km/h (300-mph) at sea level. The third prototype featured more extensive remodeling of the wings, with clipped wingtips (reducing wingspan by 1.57-m) and sweeping back the leading edges. In addition, the tailplane was also improved. This last prototype also was fitted with a ventral oil cooler

The third prototype displayed improved performance and handling, but officials complained of the I-21's need for an unacceptably long runway and its tricky character on landing. In the event, a planned pre-series run for five aircraft was canceled by Soviet officials, who likely felt the I-21 simply did not offer much more than types already in established production.

== Specifications (I-21) ==
Data from

General characteristics

- Crew: 1
- Length: 8.73 m (28 ft 8 in)
- Wingspan: 9.4 m (30 ft 10 in)
- Wing area: 15.46 m^{2} (166.4 sq ft)
- Gross weight: 2,670 kg (5,886 lb)
- Powerplant: 1 × Klimov M-105P V-12 liquid-cooled piston engine, 780 kW (1,050 hp)
- Propellers: 3-bladed constant-speed propeller

Performance

- Maximum speed: 580 km/h (360 mph, 310 kn)
- Range: 760 km (470 mi, 410 nmi)
- Service ceiling: 10,600 m (34,800 ft)
- Rate of climb: 21 m/s (4,100 ft/min)
- Wing loading: 173 kg/m^{2} (35 lb/sq ft)

Armament

- Guns: 2 × 7.62×54mmR ShKAS machine guns, in wings, and one 20×99mmR ShVAK cannon or 23 mm BT-23 cannon firing through propeller hub.
