= Hispano Aviación HA-1112 =

Spanish fighter aircraft

HA-1109 & HA-1112
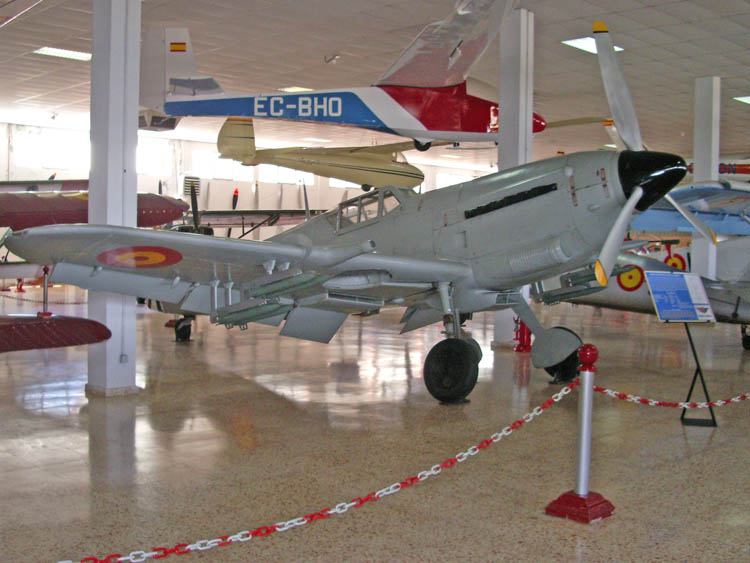
- Hispano HA.1112-K1L Tripala

General information
- Type: Fighter
- Manufacturer: Messerschmitt; Hispano Aviación
- Status: Retired
- Primary user: Spanish Air Force
- Number built: 239

History
- First flight: 2 March 1945
- Retired: 27 December 1965
- Developed from: Messerschmitt Bf 109

The Hispano Aviación HA-1109 and HA-1112 are licence-built versions of the Messerschmitt Bf 109 G-2 developed in Spain during and after World War II.

== Design and development ==
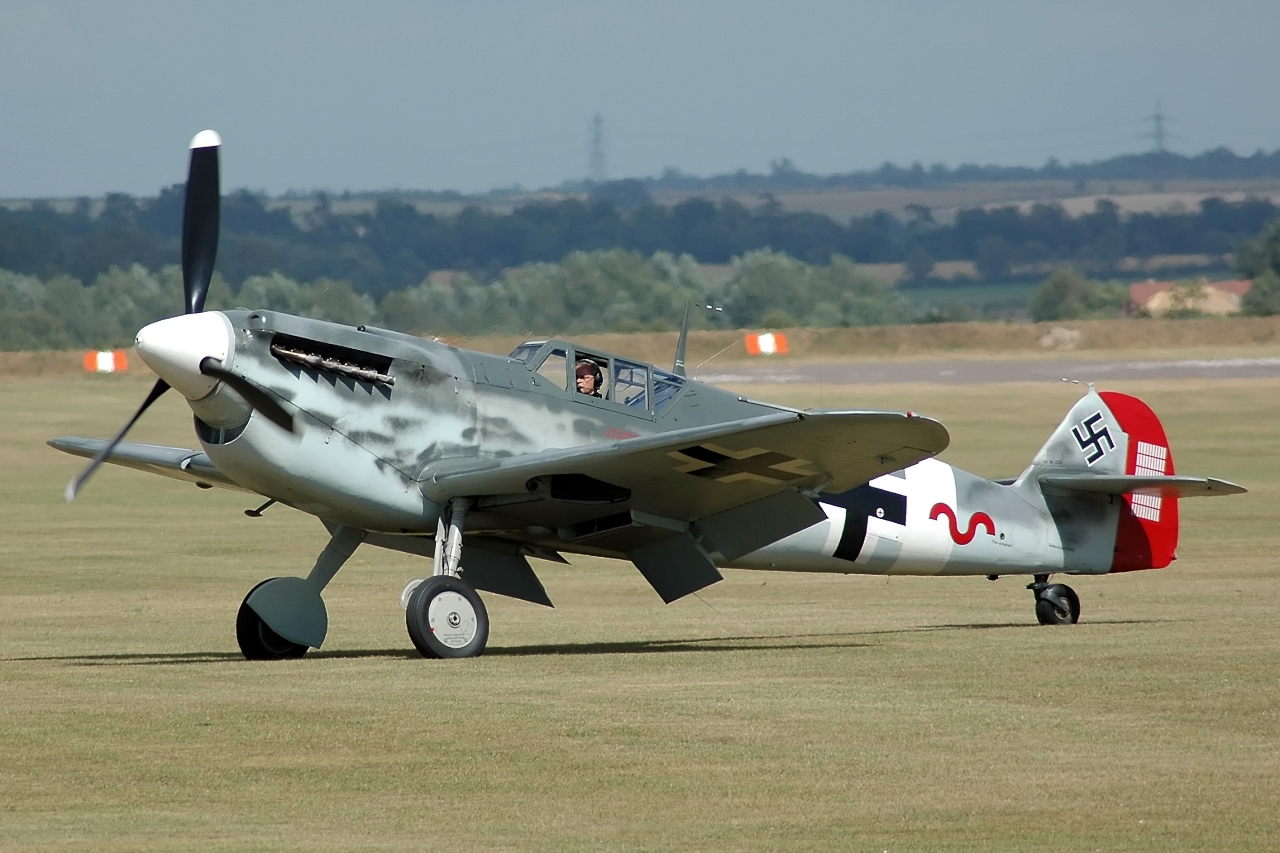
One of the last HA-1112-M1L Buchóns, repainted to represent a German Bf 109, with Luftwaffe markings, and still flying. It can be recognized by the exhaust pipes at the top of the nose, like the Spitfire (tri-blade propeller retrofitted)

In 1942, the Spanish government arranged a manufacturing licence with Messerschmitt to build the Bf 109 G-2, although the DB 605A engines, propellers, instruments and weapons were to be supplied from Germany. This proved impossible as Germany was incapable of meeting its own needs, let alone Spain's, and only 25 airframes (without their tails) and less than half the necessary drawings were actually delivered. Consequently, Hispano Aviación replaced the DB 605A engine with the 1,300 hp HS 89-12Z and the project was renamed Bf 109 J by Messerschmitt. The HS 89-12Z engine performed a successful flight in a Bf 109 E used as a flying testbed in Barcelona in 1944, and the first HA-1109-J1L made its maiden flight on 2 March 1945 in Seville, using a VDM propeller and lash-up engine mounting. The remaining 24 airframes were flown during 1947–9 with Escher-Wyss props, but never became operational.

In May 1951, a developed version, the HA-1112-K1L, improved the Hispano-Suiza, HS 17-12Z engine installation, and carried either one or two 12.7mm Breda machine guns and Pilatus eight-packs of 80mm rockets. Its three-bladed de Havilland Hydromatic propeller earned it the nickname Tripala ("three blades").

It first flew in 1951, and although 200 were planned only 65 were built. The Hispano engine was an upright V12 instead of the inverted V12 Daimler-Benz DB 601 & 605 engines used in the Bf 109 but, being of compact design, it fitted the airframe of the Bf 109 well and was able to credibly represent the Bf 109 in the German 1957 film Der Stern von Afrika (The Star of Africa) about Luftwaffe ace Hans-Joachim Marseille. The original design, starting with the Bf 109F, had an asymmetrical tail-fin aerofoil with a left deflection to counteract the torque from the Daimler-Benz's clockwise rotation. Because this was left unchanged in the Tripala despite the Hispano V12 having a counter-clockwise rotation, the tail and the engine together induced a right swing on takeoff that was hard to counteract.

A second version, the HA-1110-K1L, was a two-place tandem trainer model.

=== HA-1112-M1L ===
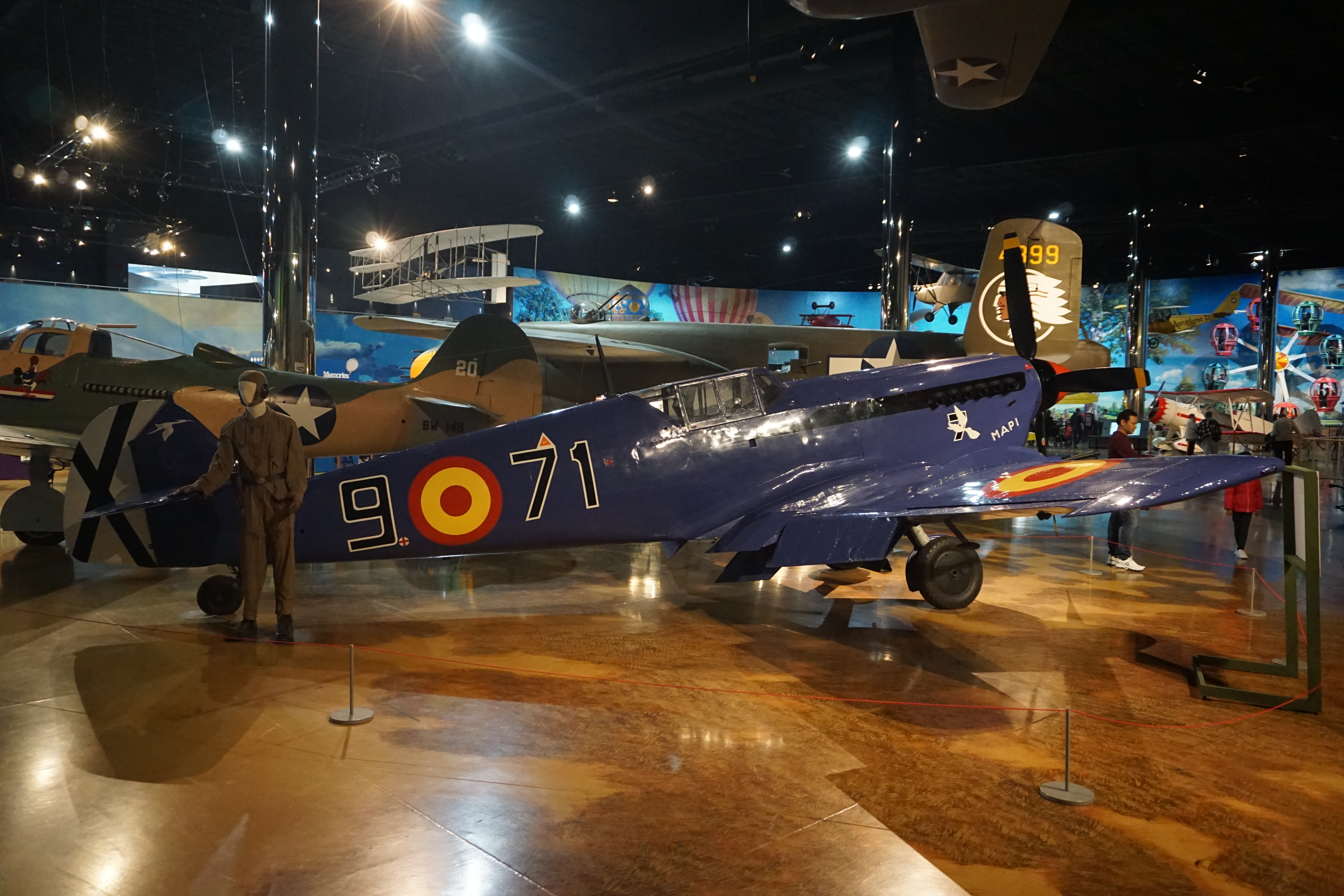
Hispano Aviación HA-1112 Buchón on display at the Air Zoo

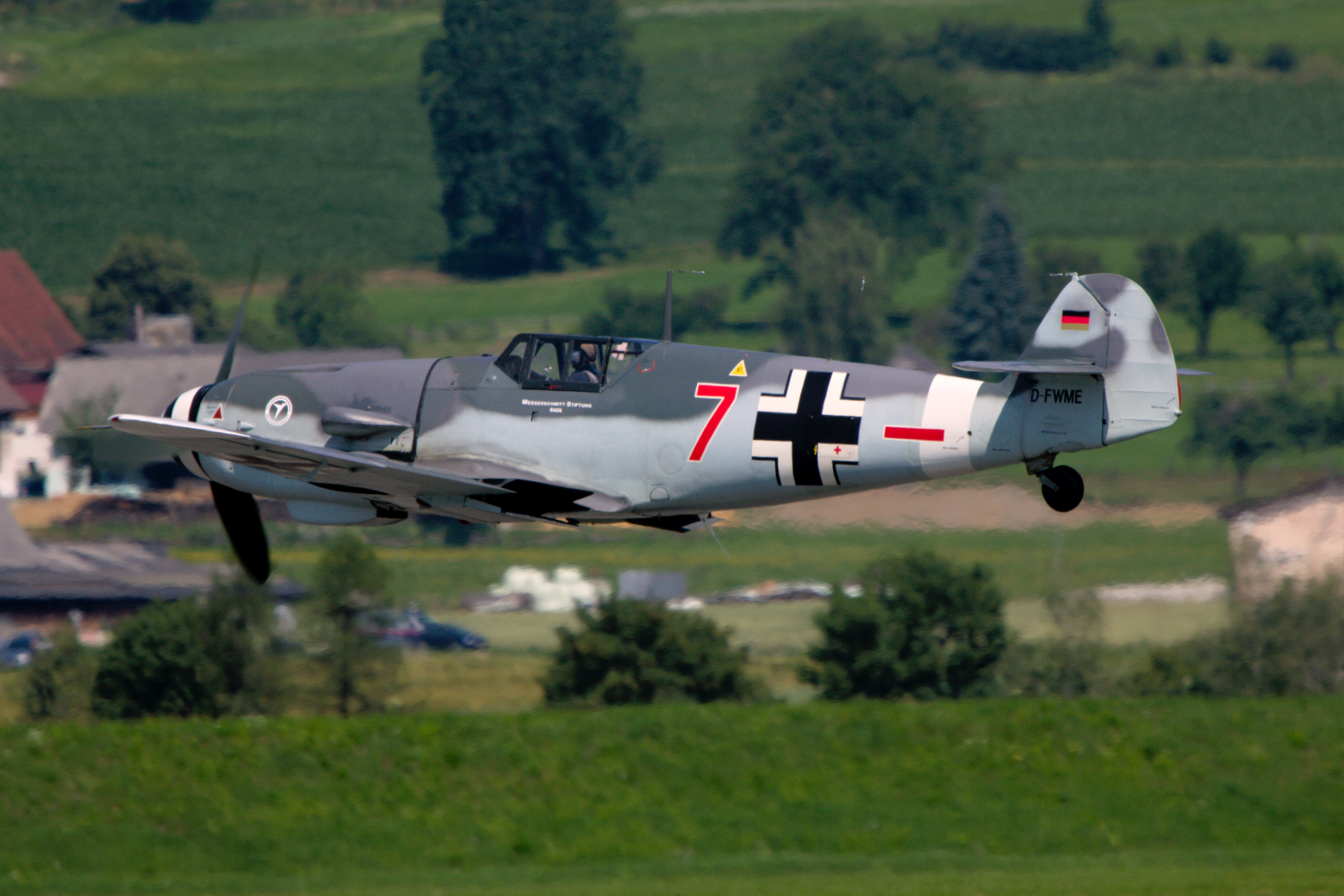
The "Rote Sieben" (Red-7), a privately owned Hispano HA-1112-M1L Buchon rebuilt as a Bf 109 G in Germany

The final variant was the HA-1112-M1L Buchón (Pouter), which is a male dove in Spanish. It first flew on 29 March 1954 with a 1,600 hp Rolls-Royce Merlin 500-45 engine and Rotol four bladed propeller, both purchased as surplus from the UK. This engine had a chin intake that altered the lines of the Bf 109's airframe. It was an improvised assembly of outdated components but this was appropriate for the intended purpose of controlling Spanish colonial territories in Africa, where more sophisticated technology was both unnecessary and unavailable in isolated Spain at the time. It carried two 20 mm Hispano-Suiza 404/408 cannons and two Oerlikon or Pilatus eight-packs of 80 mm rockets and remained in service until 27 December 1965.

==== In film ====
Due to their longevity, Buchóns have appeared in several war films masquerading as Bf 109s. In films such as Battle of Britain (alongside CASA 2.111 bombers, a Spanish-built version of the Heinkel He 111), Der Stern von Afrika, Piece of Cake (TV series), Memphis Belle, Dunkirk and The Tuskegee Airmen. Buchons also played the Bf 109's opposition, the Hawker Hurricane, in one scene in Battle of Britain.

== Variants ==
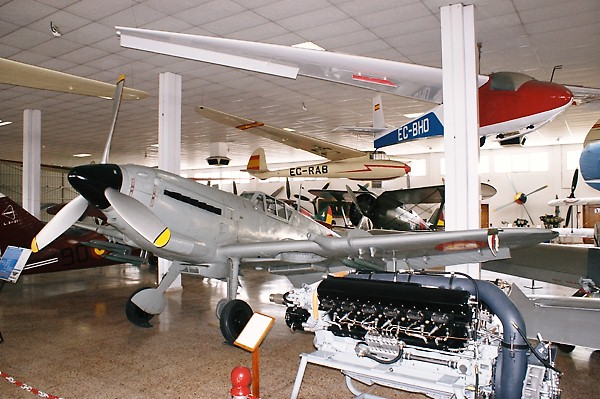
HA-1112-K1L Tripala in Museo del Aire, Madrid, Spain

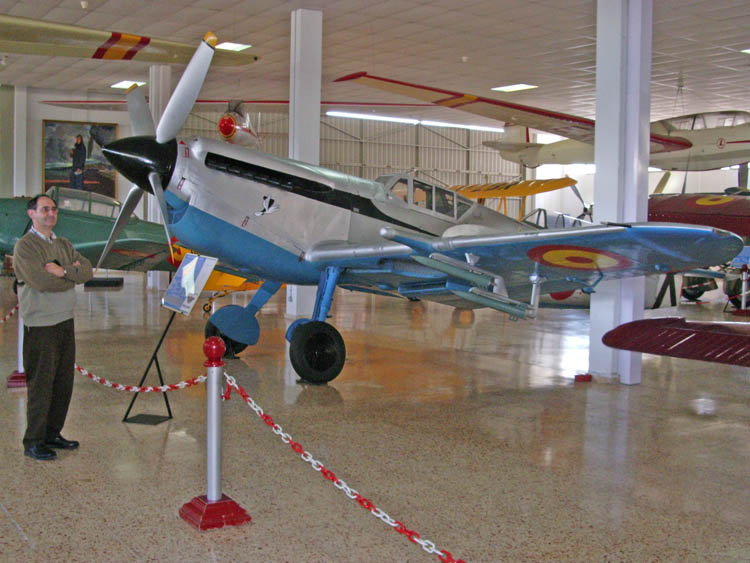
Hispano Aviación HA-1112-M1L Buchon with the original paint of the Spanish Air Force. Museo del Aire, Madrid, Spain

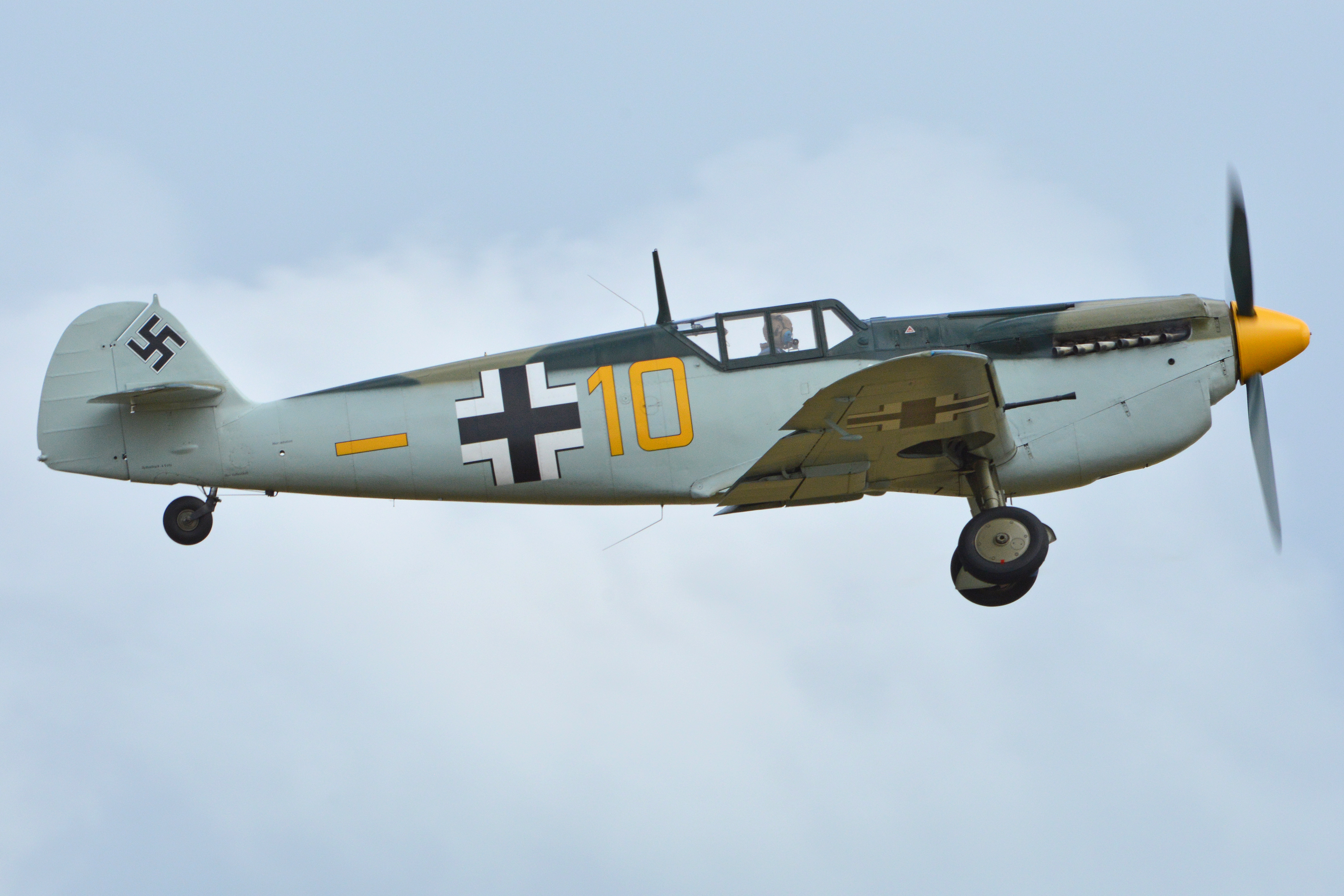
HA-1112 Buchón in 2015, still sporting the livery worn during filming of the 1969 film Battle of Britain. It was also used in the 2017 film Dunkirk

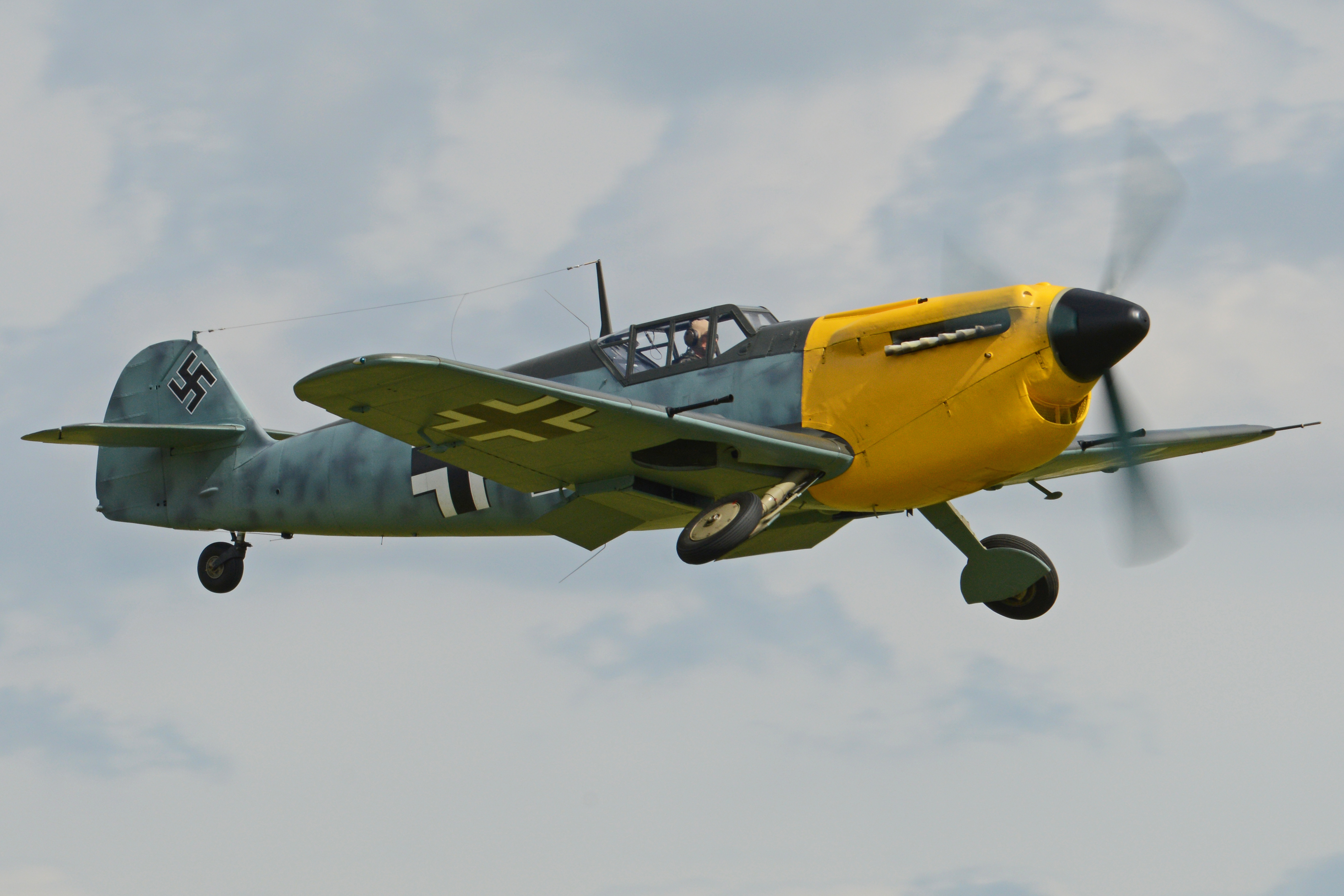
HA-1112-M1L, used in the films Battle of Britain and Dunkirk. It is seen here wearing a temporary paint scheme for the latter

HA-1109-J1L
1945 – the initial 25 units built of the Bf 109 G-2 aircraft, from German production, with Hispano-Suiza 12Z-89 engines fitted, in lieu of Daimler-Benz DB 605A's, using VDM or Escher-Wyss propellers. Not used operationally.

HA-1109-K1L
1951 – first production of HA-1112-K1L. Fitted with a Hispano-Suiza 12Z-17 engine and a de Havilland Hydromatic propeller in an improved installation, this version appeared in May 1951 armed with two Hispano HS-404 20mm cannon and 80mm rockets. 25 conversions from a HA-1109-J1L.

HA-1109-M1L
prototype of HA-1112-M1L. A single aircraft modified with a Rolls-Royce Merlin 500-45 engine. One conversion from a HA-1112-K1L.

HA-1110-K1L
Hispano powered two-seat trainer version. Used operationally. One built.

HA-1110-M1L
RR Merlin powered two-seat trainer version. Project only.

HA-1111-K1L
Hispano powered two-seat trainer version with wingtip mounted fuel tanks. Project only.

HA-1112-K1L "Tripala"
1951 – used operationally. 65 built (25 conversions from a HA-1109-K1L).

HA-1112-M1L "Buchon"
1954 – the final variant fitted with a RR Merlin engine and armed with two Hispano HS-404 20mm cannon and 80mm rockets. Used operationally. 172 built.

HA-1112-M4L
Merlin engined two-seat trainer. Used operationally. One built and one conversion from a HA-1110-K1L.

== Aircraft on display ==
- 56 – HA-1112-K1L on static display at the Museo del Aire in Madrid.
- 67 – HA-1112-M1L airworthy with Spitfire Ltd. of St. Helier, Jersey.
- 133 – HA-1112-M1L airworthy at the Military Aviation Museum in Virginia Beach, Virginia. It has been converted to resemble a Bf 109 by Meier Motors.
- 156 – HA-1112-M1L in storage at the Musée de l'air et de l'espace in Paris.
- 164 – HA-1112-M1L on display at the Bomber Command Museum of Canada in Nanton, Alberta.
- 171 – HA-1112-M1L on static display at the Air Zoo in Portage, Michigan.
- 186 – HA-1112-M1L on static display at the Museum of Flight in Seattle, Washington.
- 193 – HA-1112-M1L airworthy at the Erickson Aircraft Collection in Madras, Oregon. It was restored to resemble a Bf 109 by Pacific Fighters.
- 199 – HA-1112-M1L on static display at the EAA AirVenture Museum in Oshkosh, Wisconsin.
- 211 – HA-1112-M1L on static display at the Museo del Aire in Madrid.
- 235 – HA-1112-M1L airworthy at the Cavanaugh Flight Museum in Addison, Texas. Removed from public display when the museum indefinitely closed on 1 January 2024. To be moved to North Texas Regional Airport in Denison, Texas.

== Specifications (HA-1112-K1L) ==
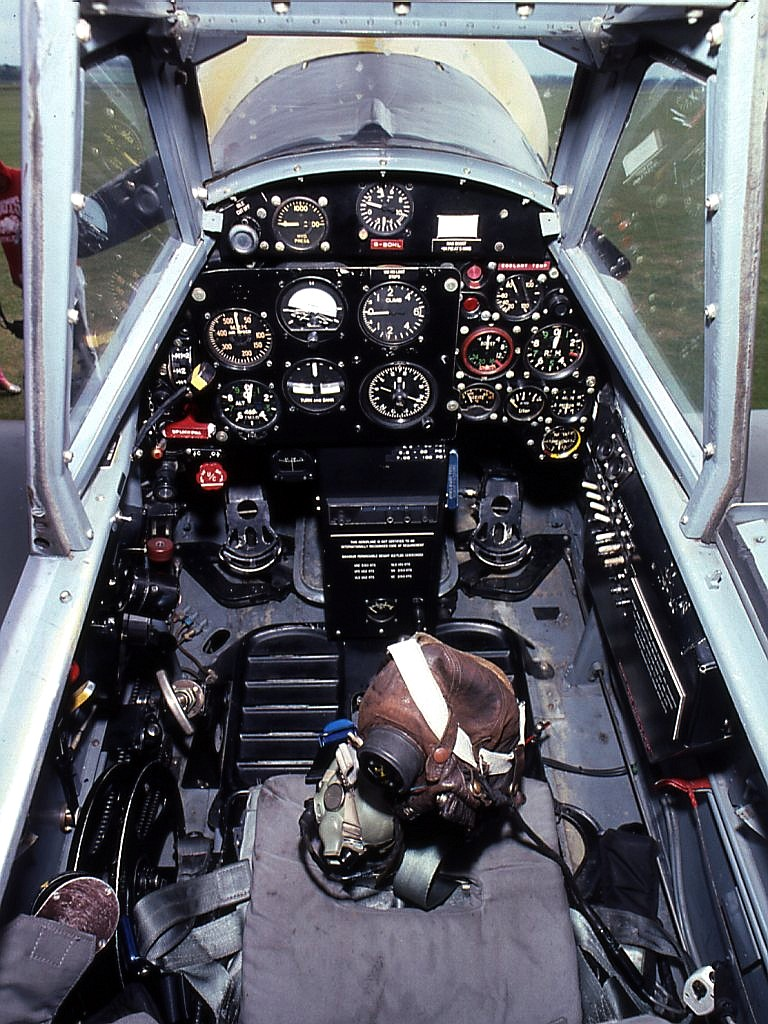
Cockpit HA-1112-M1L Buchon

General characteristics

- Crew: one
- Length: 8.49 m (27 ft 10 in)
- Wingspan: 9.92 m (32 ft 7 in)
- Height: 2.60 m (8 ft 6 in)
- Wing area: 16 m^{2} (170 sq ft)
- Empty weight: 2,475 kg (5,456 lb)

HA-1112-M1L 2,666 kg (5,878 lb)

- Max takeoff weight: 3,200 kg (7,055 lb)

HA-1112-M1L 3,330 kg (7,341 lb)

- Powerplant: 1 × Hispano-Suiza 12Z-17 V-12 liquid-cooled piston engine, 970 kW (1,300 hp)

HA-1112-M1L 1 × 1,193 kW (1,600 hp) Rolls-Royce Merlin 500/45 V-12 liquid-cooled piston engine

- Propellers: 3-bladed Hamilton-Standard constant speed propeller

HA-1112-M1L 4-bladed Rotol propeller

Performance

- Maximum speed: 600 km/h (370 mph, 320 kn)

HA-1112-M1L 665 km/h (413 mph)

- Cruise speed: 400 km/h (250 mph, 220 kn)
- Range: 690 km (430 mi, 370 nmi)

HA-1112-M1L 765 km (475 mi)

- Service ceiling: 9,800 m (32,200 ft)

HA-1112-M1L 10,200 m (33,465 ft)

- Rate of climb: 28.33 m/s (5,577 ft/min)

HA-1112-M1L

- Wing loading: 200 kg/m^{2} (41 lb/sq ft)

HA-1112-M1L 206 kg/m^{2} (42.2 lb/ft^{2})

Armament

- Guns: 2 × 20 mm Hispano-Suiza HS.404/408 cannon
- Rockets: two racks of 8 × 80 mm Oerlikon rockets

== See also ==
Related development

- Messerschmitt Bf 109
- Avia S-99/S-199

Aircraft of comparable role, configuration, and era

- Fiat G.55 Centauro
- Ikarus S-49
- Kawasaki Ki-61 Hien
- Macchi C.205 Veltro
- North American P-51D Mustang
- Supermarine Spitfire Mk. IX
- Yakovlev Yak-9
