= M106 =

M106 or M-106 may refer to:

- M106 (New York City bus), a New York City Bus route in Manhattan
- M-106 (Michigan highway), a state highway in Michigan
- BMW M106, a motor
- Messier 106, a spiral galaxy about in the constellation Canes Venatici
- Klimov VK-106 or M-106 aircraft engine
- M106 mortar carrier a tracked, self-propelled artillery vehicle formerly in service with the United States Army
