= Klimov =

Aerospace manufacturer in Russia

JSC UEC-Klimov
- Native name: АО «ОДК-Климов»
- Company type: Joint-stock company
- Industry: Aerospace
- Founded: 1912; 114 years ago
- Headquarters: Saint Petersburg, Russia
- Key people: Alexander Grachev (deputy general manager, managing director; Dmitry Tverdokhleb (deputy managing director)
- Products: Gas turbines, Rocket engines, Auxiliary power units, Gearboxes
- Revenue: $327 million (2017)
- Operating income: $9.84 million (2017)
- Net income: $2.91 million (2017)
- Total assets: $482 million (2017)
- Total equity: $76.6 million (2017)
- Number of employees: 3300 (2022)
- Parent: United Engine Corporation
- Website: www.uecrus.com

UEC-Klimov (ОДК-Климов) is a Russian manufacturer of gas turbine engines, main gearboxes and accessory drive gearboxes for transport aircraft.

Originally established as Kirill Klimov Experimental Design Bureau in Saint-Petersburg under the direction of Vladimir Yakovlevich Klimov (Влади́мир Я́ковлевич Кли́мов) (1892–1962), Klimov designed engines for Soviet aircraft based on Renault aircraft engine designs. It may have used the designation Aircraft Repair Factory (aviazavod, ARZ) 117 during the Soviet period.

== History ==
The Klimov OKB was formed in the early 1930s to produce and improve upon the liquid-cooled Hispano-Suiza 12Y V-12 piston engine for which the USSR had acquired a license. At that time Klimov also manufactured motorcycles.

In 1946 the British government allowed Rolls-Royce to sell a number of Nene and Derwent V turbojet engines to the Soviet Union. Klimov OKB was given the task of "metrifying" the British designs, without the knowledge or permission of the West, as the VK-1 and RD-500.

Klimov United Engine Company is now located in Saint Petersburg.

It used the nationalised buildings originally erected by 1914 in the city's present-day Vyborgsky District for the joint stock Russian Renault automotive works, adding new workshop and administrative premises on the land in Bolshoy Sampsoniyevskiy Prospect avenue near the present Kantemirovskaya Street. By 2020 the premises have been vacated for redevelopment for a housing project.

== Piston engines ==
- M-100 – Hispano-Suiza 12Ydrs built under license
- M-103 – improved M-100
- M-105 – improved M-103; redesignated as VK-105 in 1943
- M-110
- M-120 – prototype inline 18-cylinder with three M-103A blocks in an inverted Y configuration; cancelled due to engine malfunction

During World War II, designations were changed from M (motor) to VK (the lead designer's initials)

- VK-106 (M-106 before March 1944) – prototype developed from M-105 with improved performance at lower altitudes; cancelled due to cooling problems
- VK-107 (M-107 before March 1944) - development of M-105 and VK-106 with four valves per cylinder and more power
- VK-108 – prototype version of VK-107 with 1850 hp on takeoff; never entered production
- VK-109 - 1945-1946 development of the VK-108 with water injection, intended for the Myasishchev VB-109
- VK-110 - based on VK-109, 2100 hp; only a project
- VK-150 - inline 24-cylinder concept, 3700 hp

== Gas turbine engines ==
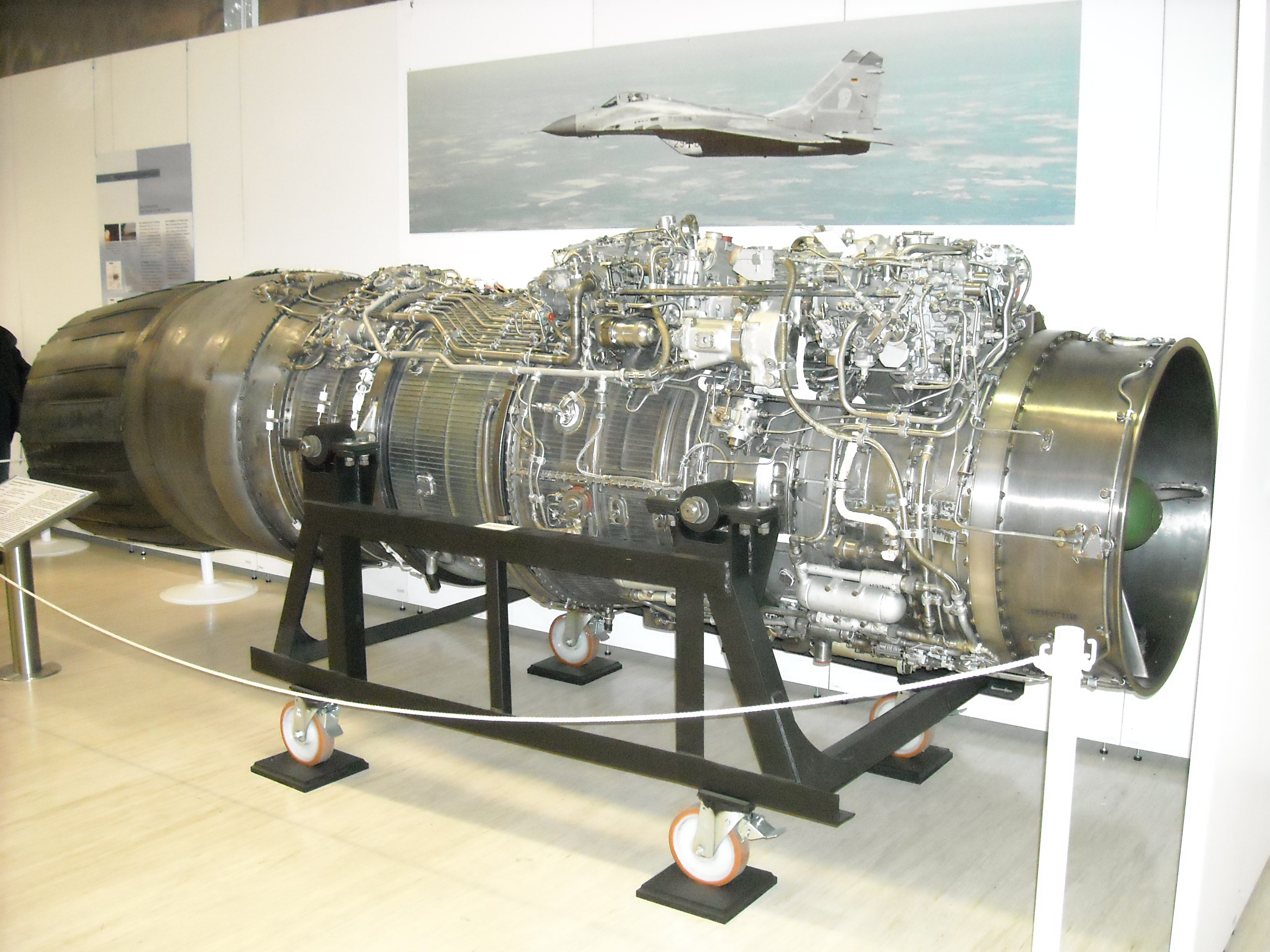
Klimov RD-33 turbofan from Mig-29

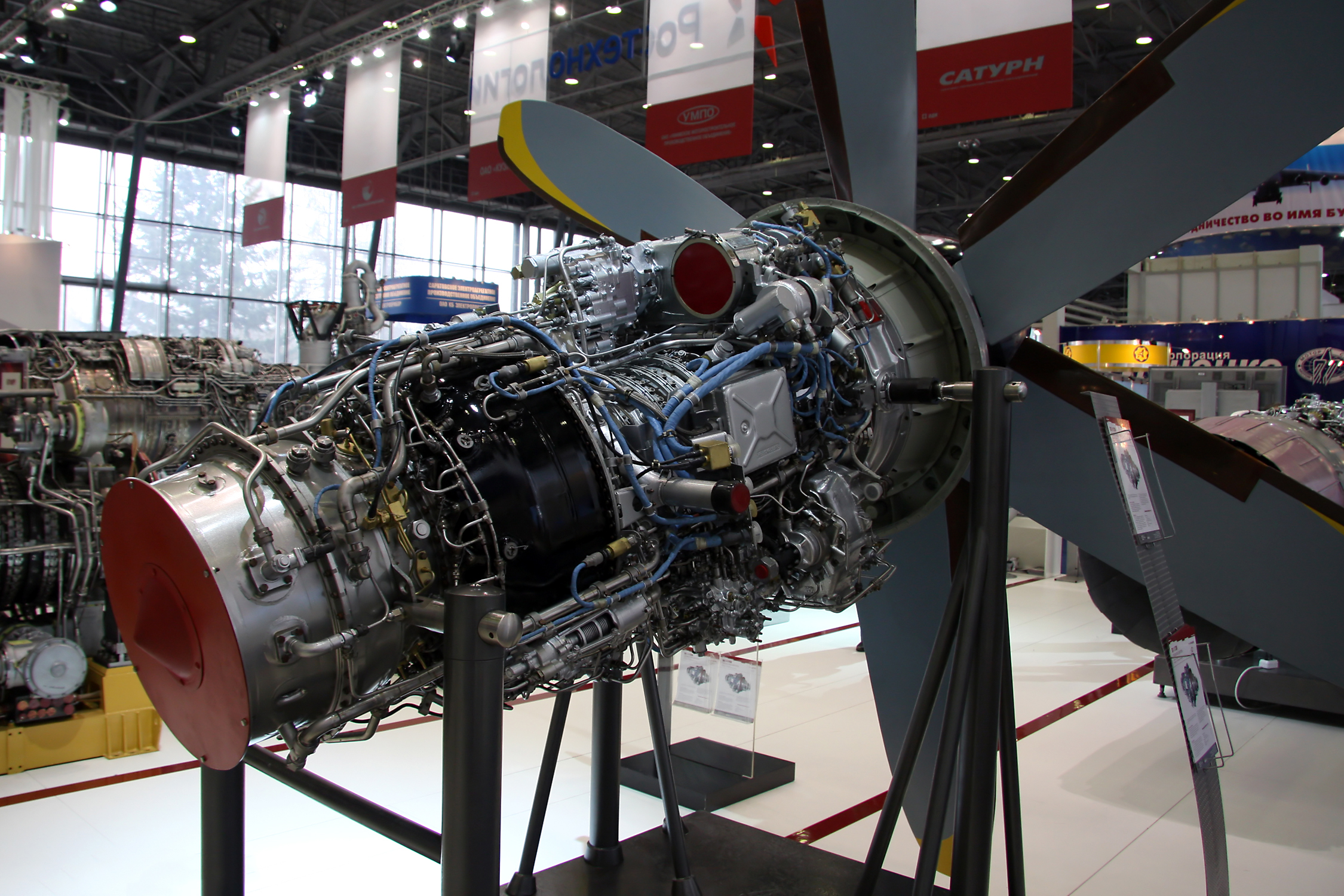
Klimov TV7-117 turboshaft

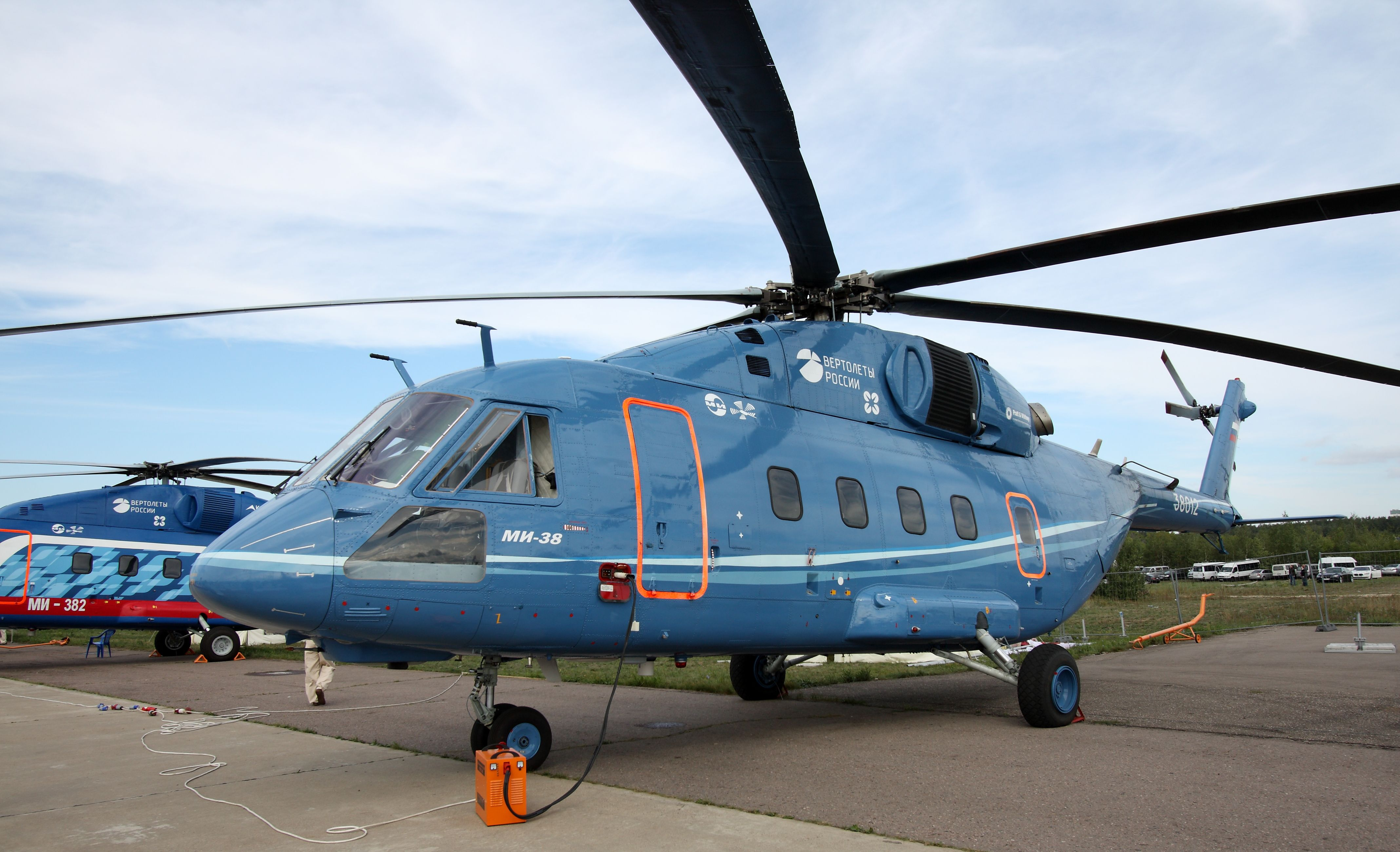
Mi-38 powered by Klimov TV7-117

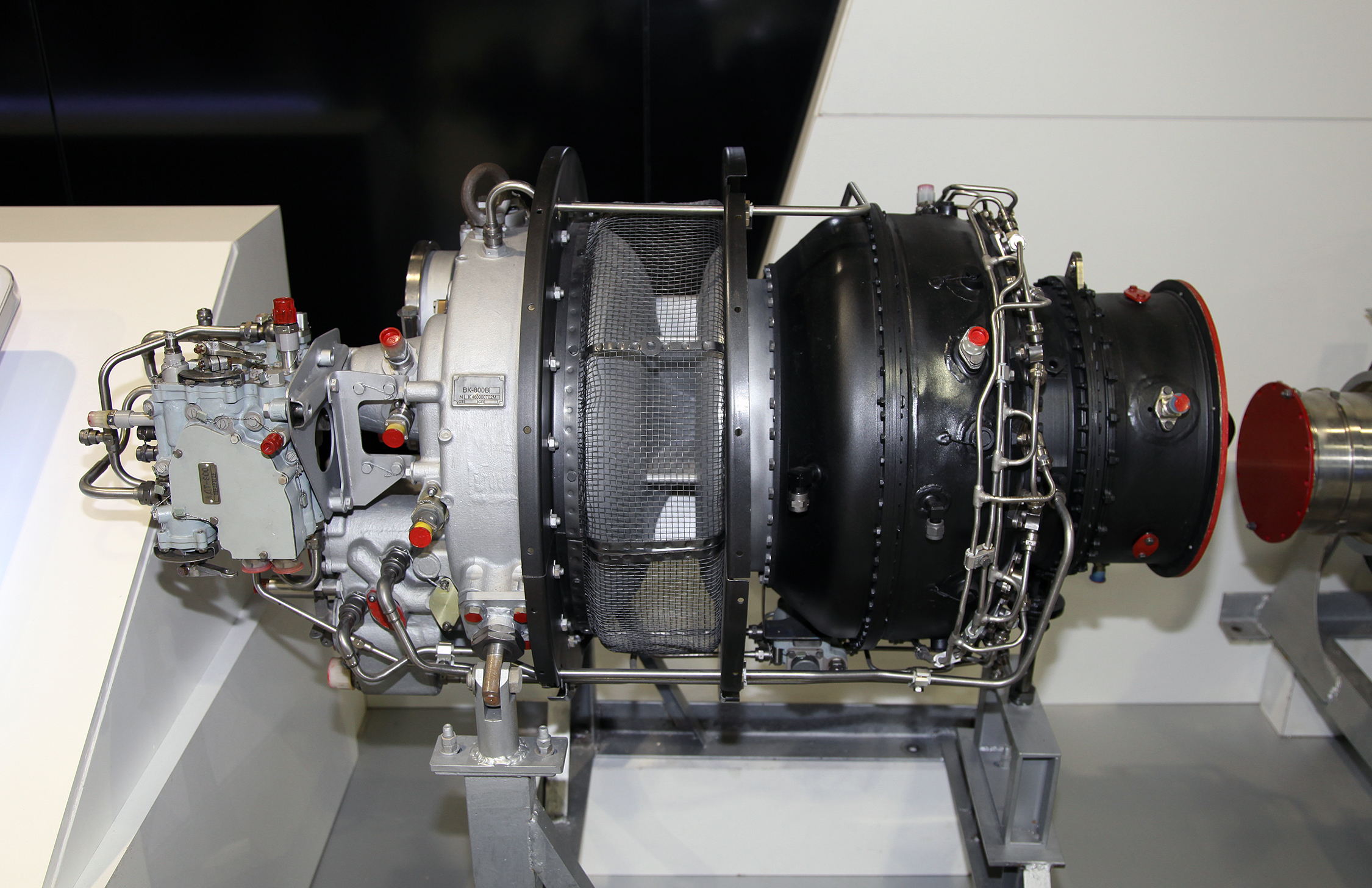
Klimov VK-800 turboshaft

- RD-10 (along AI Ivchenko Progress (Motor Sich), KMPO & SNTK Kuznetsov (OAO Motorostroitel), elsewhere)
- RD-33 and variants, derivatives: RD-5000B for UCAV UAV like MiG Skat
- RD-93MA is a derivative of the RD-33 and is specifically designed for single engine light fighter jets. It uses the BARK-93MA automatic control system
- Klimov VK-10M 22 to 24,200 lbf (97.87 - 107.647 kN)
- RD-35, agreement with Slovakian PSLM ZVL
- RD-45
- GTD-350
- RD-500, copy of the Rolls-Royce Derwent V
- TV2-117 (built by Isotov from 1959–1964)
- TV3-117 variants

TV3-117VM VMA for Mil and Kamov helicopters
TV3-117VMA-SBM1 Turboprop for the An-140, MiG-110, Be-32K

- ТV7-117 TV7-117ST-01 TV7-117ST-02 Gas turbines

TV7-117S Turboprop for Aircraft
TV7-117K naval variant

- Klimov TV and VK derived Turboprop and Turbofan engines powerplants
- Klimov TV17-117 new perspective engine, follow up of the TV family
- VK-1
- VK-3 turbojet
- VK- (and TV-) turbojets turbofan, gas turbines, turboprop turboshafts
- VK-13 turbojet turbofan
- TR3-117 turbojet for UAV Tu-143
- VK-800, VK800V also at Motor Sich
- VK-1500 variant or derivative of TV3-117 engine
- VK-2500 VK-2500PS-03 enhancement of TV3-117
- VK-650V 400 5 - 750 hp turboshaft for Ka-226 . VK-1600V project for Ka-62
- PDV-4000 4 5000 hp (3 3.8 MW) turboshaft, turboprop
- VK-3000 (VK300V also at OMKB OMO Baranov), VK3500 (TVa-3000) also at Motor Sich, VK-5000 and/or VK-6000 perspective
- GTU-18P GTU-14F GTU-24R GTU-28N Gas Turbines

MBT and vehicles, wagon locomotives GTs

- GTD-1000T, GTD-1250
- GTD-1400, GTD-1500

== Auxiliary power unit ==
- GTDE-117
- VK-100
- VK-150
