= Klimov M-120 =

1940s Soviet piston aircraft engine

M-120
- Type: Liquid-cooled, 18-cylinder, three-block inline engine
- National origin: Soviet Union
- Manufacturer: Klimov
- First run: 1940
- Manufactured: 1939–40
- Number built: 5?
- Developed from: Klimov M-103

The Klimov M-120 was a Soviet prototype 18-cylinder liquid-cooled inline aircraft engine designed during the early years of World War II. Testing did not go well and it was cancelled in 1942.

== Development ==
The M-120 was developed by arranging three Klimov M-103A cylinder blocks in an inverted 'Y' configuration, driving a common crankshaft. It began development in 1938 and manufacture of five prototypes began in late 1939. The first prototype was completed on 30 October 1939 and began bench tests the next year. Two M-120TKs were flown in a prototype Ilyushin DB-4 bomber in November 1940. It was submitted for its State acceptance trials in August 1941, but the main connecting rod and the supercharger both broke down and the tests were not completed. The project was cancelled in 1942.

== Variants ==
M-120
1,600 hp (1,193 kW), weight of 850–895 kg (1,874–1,973 lb).
M-120TK
1600 hp, weight of 950 kg (2,094 lb), fitted with turbo-supercharger.
M-120UV
1,800 hp (1,342 kW). Version with a long shaft to the remote reduction gear.
M-120UV-TK
A 1940 project to combine the two variants.

== Specifications (M-120TK) ==
Data from Kotelnikov, p. 146

=== General characteristics ===
- Type: liquid-cooled, 18-cylinder, three-block inline engine
- Bore: 148 mm (5.8 in)
- Stroke: 170 mm (6.7 in)
- Displacement: 54 L (3,295 cu in)
- Dry weight: 950 kg (2,090 lb)

=== Components ===
- Supercharger: single stage, two-speed geared
- Cooling system: liquid

=== Performance ===
- Power output: 1,600 hp (1,193 kW)
- Compression ratio: 6.6:1

== See also ==
Related lists

- List of aircraft engines
