= Yakovlev Yak-1 =

1940s fighter aircraft family by Yakovlev

Yak-1
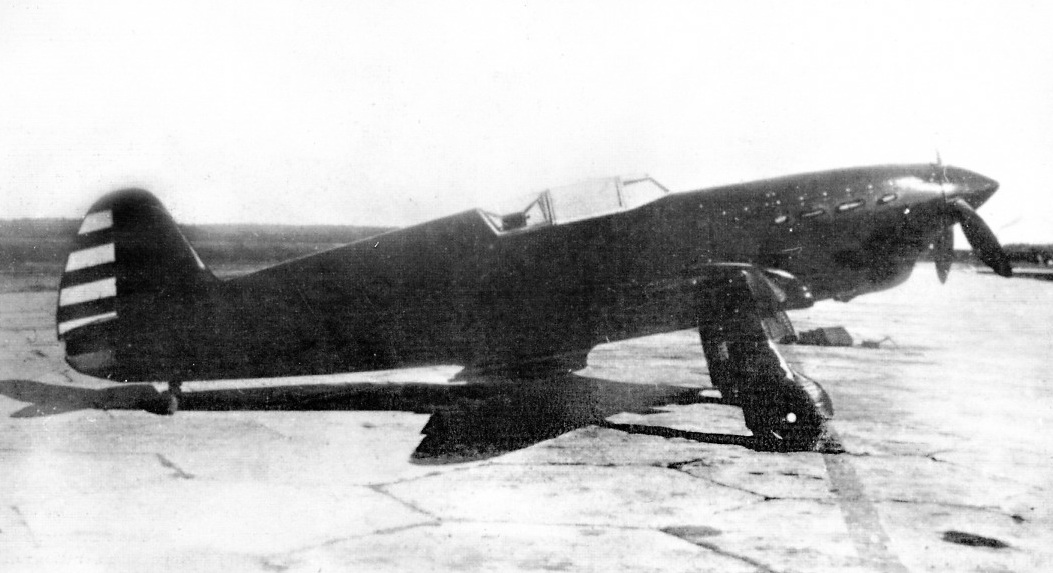
- An I-26 prototype of the Yak-1

General information
- Type: Fighter aircraft
- Manufacturer: Yakovlev OKB
- Primary user: Soviet Air Force
- Number built: 8,700

History
- Manufactured: 1940–1944
- Introduction date: 1940
- First flight: 13 January 1940
- Retired: 1950
- Variants: Yakovlev Yak-3; Yakovlev Yak-7

The Yakovlev Yak-1 (Russian: Яковлев Як-1) is a Soviet fighter aircraft of World War II. The Yak-1 was a single-seat monoplane with a composite structure and wooden wings; production began in early 1940.

The Yak-1 was a maneuverable, fast and competitive fighter aircraft. The composite-wooden structure made it easy to maintain and the engine proved to be reliable. It formed the basis for subsequent developments from the Yakovlev bureau and was the founder of a family of aircraft, with some 43,000 being built. As a reward, designer Alexander Yakovlev was awarded the Order of Lenin (Russian: Орден Ленина, Orden Lenina) (the highest civilian decoration bestowed by the Soviet Union), a 100,000 ruble prize, and a ZIS motor car.

== Design and development ==
Before the war, Yakovlev was best known for building light sports aircraft. His Yak-4 light bomber impressed the Soviet government enough to order the OKB to design a new fighter with a Klimov M-106 V-12 liquid-cooled engine. Formal specifications, which were released on 29 July 1939, called for two prototypes – I-26-1 with a top speed of 620 km/h (390 mph) at 6,000 m (20,000 ft), combat range of 600 km (370 mi), a climb to 10,000 m (33,000 ft)) of under 11 minutes, armed with 2 × 7.62 mm (0.300 in) ShKAS machine guns and 1 × 12.7 mm (0.50 in) Berezin BS heavy machine gun. I-26-2 had a turbocharged M-106 engine with a top speed of 650 km/h (400 mph) at 10,000 m (33,000 ft) and armament of 2 × 7.62 mm (0.300 in) ShKAS machine guns. The design took full advantage of Yakovlev OKB's experience with sports aircraft and promised agility as well as high top speed. Since the M-106 was delayed, the design was changed to incorporate the Klimov M-105P V-12 engine, with a 20 mm (0.787 in) ShVAK cannon in the "vee" of the engine block, in a motornaya pushka mount.

I-26-I first flew on 13 January 1940 and suffered from oil overheating which was never completely resolved, resulting in 15 emergency landings during early testing. On 27 April 1940, I-26-1 crashed, killing its test pilot Yu.I. Piontkovskiy. The investigation of the crash found that the pilot had performed two consecutive barrel rolls at low altitude, which was in violation of the test flight plan. It was believed that during the first roll, the main landing gear became unlocked, causing it to crash through the wing during the second roll. It has been speculated that Piontkovskiy's deviation from the flight plan was caused by frustration that his aircraft was being used for engine testing while I-26-2, built with the lessons of I-26-1 in mind, was already performing aerobatics.

Technical problems with sub-assemblies provided by different suppliers raised the I-26-2's weight 400 kg (880 lb) above projected figures, which restricted the airframe to only 4.4 G, while oil overheating continued to occur. The many defects caused I-26-2 to fail government testing in 1940. Fortunately for Yakovlev, its competitors, I-200 (future Mikoyan-Gurevich MiG-3) and I-301 (future LaGG-3), also failed testing. Requested improvements were incorporated into I-26-3, which was delivered for testing on 13 October 1940. Although it passed on 9 December 1940, the aircraft was still very much unfinished, its engine problems still unresolved.

Troublesome and slow testing and development concerned Soviet officials, since I-26 was ordered into production under the name "Yak-1" on 19 February 1940, a mere month after I-26-1 made its maiden flight. The gamble was intended to reduce the time between the prototype and the beginning of production of service aircraft; the I-200 and I-301 were also ordered into production. The Yak-1 was slower than the I-200 and less heavily armed than the I-301, it enjoyed the advantage of having been started earlier, which gave it a consistent lead in testing and development over its competitors. Due to Operation Barbarossa the Axis invasion of the Soviet Union on 22 June 1941, development of promising designs, like the Polikarpov I-185, proved unfeasible. Yakovlev might have been Joseph Stalin's favorite, which may have been in the Yak-1's favor.

Simultaneous manufacturing and testing of a design that required as many improvements as I-26 caused much disruption of production. Almost 8,000 changes were made to the blueprints by 1941, with an additional 7,000 implemented the following year and 5,000 more in 1942. Production was further slowed by shortages of engines, propellers, radiators, wheels and cannons. Shortages of quality materials resulted in plywood being shed from the wings of several aircraft. Factory No.292, the main manufacturer of Yak-1s was bombed on 23 June 1941 and burned to the ground; production resumed amid the ruins on 29 June. Due to loose tolerances, each aircraft was unique, with workers performing the final assembly having to mate dissimilar components. The left and right main landing gear could be of different lengths and different angles relative to the aircraft, which required adjusting their attachments to ensure an even stance for the aircraft and parts were often not interchangeable. Production of the Yak-1 ended in July 1944, with somewhere around 8,700 built.

== Operational history ==
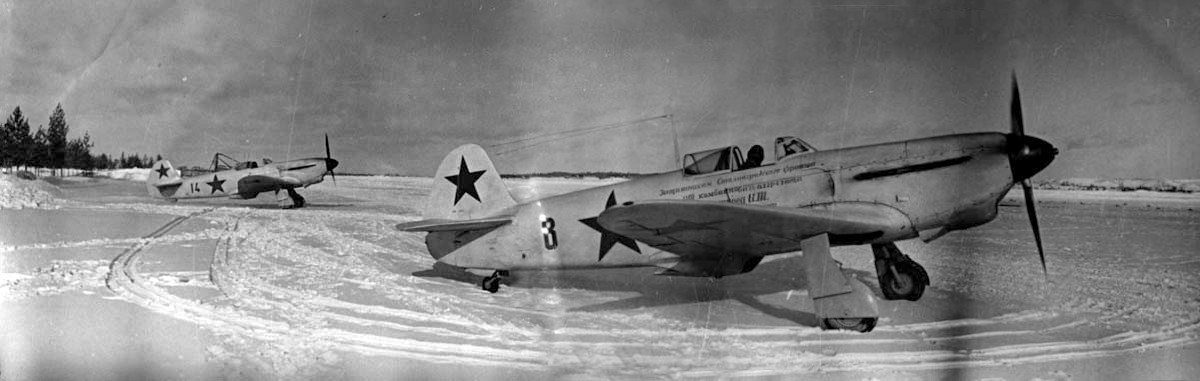
Yak-1Bs of the 14th Guards Fighter Aviation Regiment, Leningrad Front, before a combat sortie, 1943.

At the time of Operation Barbarossa on 22 June 1941, 425 Yak-1s had been built, although many were en route or still incomplete. 92 machines were fully operational in the Western Military Districts but most were lost in the first days. The Yak-1 was built as an escort fighter for Il-2 tactical bombers and combats took place below 4,000 m (13,000 ft), where the Yak-1 performed the best. The Yak-1 proved to have a significant advantage over its Soviet competitors. A full circle turn took just 17 seconds in the Yak-1M. The MiG-3, which had the best high-altitude performance, did poorly at low and medium altitudes and its light armament made it unsuitable for ground attack. The LaGG-3 experienced a significant degradation in performance (as much as 100 km/h (62 mph) on some aircraft) compared to its prototypes due to the manufacturer's inexperience with its special wooden construction, which suffered from warping and rotting when exposed to the elements. The Yak-1's plywood covering also suffered from the weather, but the steel frame kept the aircraft largely intact.

Early aircraft suffered from fuel leaks, spot-welded fuel tanks failing from vibration. The canopy could not be opened under certain conditions in earlier models and some pilots had the sliding portion of the canopy removed. The first 1,000 Yak-1s had no radios; wireless equipment became common by spring 1942 and obligatory by August 1942 but Soviet radios were notoriously unreliable and short-ranged, so they were frequently removed to save weight. The M-105 could not tolerate negative G forces which starved it of fuel and suffered from breakdowns of magnetos, speed governors and emitted oil from the reduction shaft.

The Yak-1 was better than the Bf 109E but inferior to the Bf 109F – its main opponent – in rate of climb at all altitudes, although it could complete a circle at the same speed (20–21 seconds at 1,000 m (3,300 ft)). The Bf 109, with its automatic wing slats, had a lower stall speed and was more stable in sharp turns and vertical aerobatic figures. A simulated combat between a Yak (with M-105PF engine) and a Bf 109F revealed that the Messerschmitt had only marginally superior maneuverability at 1,000 m (3,300 ft), though the German fighter could gain substantial advantage over the Yak-1 within four or five nose-to-tail turns. At 3,000 m (9,800 ft), the capabilities of the two fighters were nearly equal, as combat was essentially reduced to head-on attacks. At altitudes over 5,000 m (16,000 ft), the Yak was more manoeuvrable. The engine's nominal speed at low altitudes was lowered to 2,550 rpm, and the superiority of the Bf 109F at these altitudes was reduced.

The Yak-1's armament would be considered too light by Western standards but was typical of Soviet aircraft, pilots preferring a few guns grouped on the centerline to improve accuracy and reduce weight. Wing guns were rarely used on Soviet fighters and when they were supplied, they were often removed (as they were from US-supplied Bell P-39 Airacobras). Avoiding wing guns reduced weight and demonstrably improved roll rates (the same was true of the Bf 109F). The US and Britain considered heavy armament and high performance necessary, even at the cost of inferior maneuverability, while the Soviets relied on the marksmanship of their pilots coupled with agile aircraft. Even with the Yak-1's light armament, to reduce weight, modifications were made on the front line and on about thirty production aircraft: the 7.62 mm ShKAS machine-guns were removed, retaining only the single ShVAK cannon. Nevertheless, these lighter aircraft were popular with experienced pilots, for whom the reduction in armament was acceptable and combat experience in November 1942 showed a much improved kill-to-loss ratio. In the autumn of 1942, the Yak-1B appeared, with the more powerful M-105P engine and a single 12.7 mm UBS machine gun instead of the two ShKAS. Although this did not increase the total weight of fire much, the UBS machine-gun was much more effective than the two 7.62 mm ShKAS. The simple VV ring sight replaced the PBP gun-sight because of the very poor quality of the latter's lenses. The Yak-1 had a light tail, and it was easy to tip over and to hit the ground with the propeller. Often, technicians had to keep the tail down, which could lead to accidents, with aircraft taking off with technicians still on the rear fuselage.

The Yak-1 was well liked by its pilots; Nikolai G. Golodnikov considered that the Yak-1B, flown by experienced pilots, could meet the Bf 109F-4 and G-2 on equal terms. The French Normandie-Niemen squadron selected the primitive model Yak-1M (that had a cut-down fuselage to allow all-round vision) when it was formed, in March 1943. Twenty-four of these aircraft were sent to the all-female 586th Fighter Aviation Regiment, whose pilots included the world's only female aces: Katya Budanova, with 5, and Lydia Litvyak (claims range between 5 and 12, plus two shared). Litvyak flew Yak-1 "Yellow 44", with an aerial mast, at first in 296th Fighter Aviation Regiment and then with 73rd Guards Fighter Aviation Regiment, until her death in combat on 1 August 1943. Another ace who flew the Yak-1 was Mikhail Baranov, who scored all his 24 victories with it, including five in a day (four Bf 109s and a Ju 87, on 6 August 1942). The Yak-1 was also the first type operated by the 1 Pułk Lotnictwa Myśliwskiego "Warszawa" (1st Polish Fighter Regiment "Warsaw").

Soviet naming conventions obscure the fact that the Yak-1 and its successors – the Yak-7, Yak-9 and Yak-3 – are essentially the same design, comparable to the numerous Spitfire or Bf 109 variants. Were the Yaks considered as one type, the 37,000 built would constitute the most produced fighter in history. That total would also make the Yak one of the most prolific aircraft in history, roughly equal to the best known Soviet ground attack type of World War II, the IL-2 Shturmovik. Losses were the highest of all fighter types in service in the USSR: from 1941 to 1945, VVS KA lost 3,336 Yak-1s: 325 in 1941, 1,301 the following year, 1,056 in 1943, 575 in 1944 and 79 in 1945.

== Surviving aircraft ==
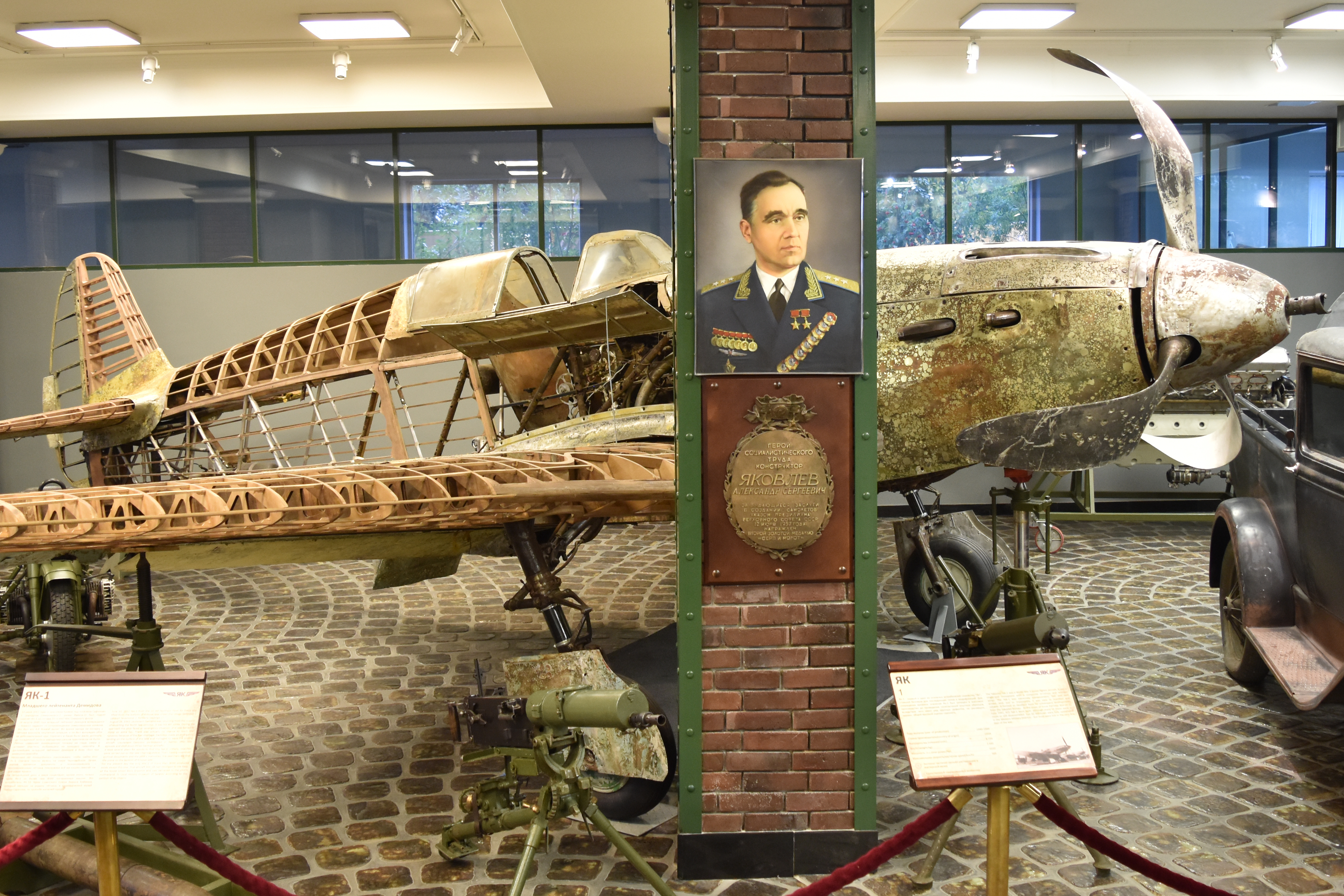
Technical Museum of Vadim Zadorozhny, Arkhangelsk, Moscow Oblast, Russia

There is only one complete Yak 1 still in existence, Yak 1 “22 white” is on display in a partially restored condition at the Technical Museum of Vadim Zadorozhny, Arkhangelsk, Moscow Oblast, Russia. A Yak 1 is currently being restored to airworthy condition by a private owner with its original engine.

== Variants ==
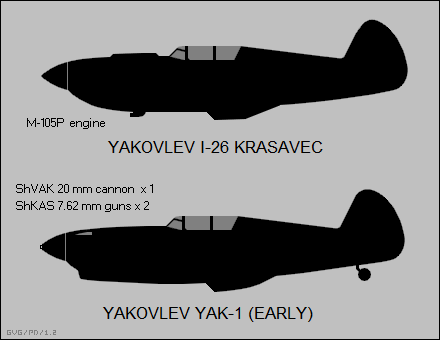
- Side-view silhouettes of the Yakovlev I-26 Krasevec and an early production Yak-1.
  I-26 (also known as Ya-26) – The first prototype of the Yak-1 and progenitor of all Yakovlev's piston-engined fighters of World War II. Of mixed steel tube and wood construction the lightweight I-26 displayed promising performance and was produced as the Yak-1.
- UTI-26 – The third and fourth I-26s were completed as dual control trainers, produced as a fighter as the Yak-7.
- I-28 – High-altitude interceptor prototype with Klimov M-105PD engine developed from I-26-2. Differed from I-26 in having an all-metal fuselage and tail and automatic, leading-edge slats on slightly smaller and reshaped wings. One aircraft was built, first flying on 1 December 1940. It did not enter production due to many deficiencies of the engine but served as the basis for high-altitude versions of Yak-7 and Yak-9.
- I-30 (Yak-3) – Development of I-26 with an all-metal wing with leading-edge slats, weight and space savings were used for additional armament and greater fuel capacity. Two prototypes built – I-30-1 armed with 3 × 20 mm (0.79 in) ShVAK cannons and 2 × 7.62 mm (0.300 in) ShKAS machine guns, and I-30-2 with two additional ShKAS. It did not enter production. The name Yak-3 was re-used for a different fighter. See Yakovlev Yak-3.
- Yak-1 – Single-seat fighter aircraft. Initial production version.
- Yak-1b – ("b" was an unofficial designation; after October 1942, all Yak-1s were built to this standard). New bubble canopy with lowered rear fuselage, increased armor, ShKAS machine guns replaced with a single 12.7 mm (0.50 in) Berezin UBS, electrical and pneumatic firing of the weapons instead of the mechanical system, new control stick based on the Messerschmitt Bf 109 design, new gunsight, airtight fuselage, retractable tailwheel, improved engine cooling, Klimov M-105PF engine with better low-altitude performance. The first flight (aircraft No.3560) took place in June 1942, with aircraft entering production in August. A total of 4,188 were built.
- Yak-1M – Yak-3 prototype with a smaller wing, revised cooling intakes, reduced overall weight and upgraded engine. Two were built.
- Yak-7UTI – Initial production version of the UTI-26.
- Yak-7 – Conversions of Yak-7UTI and new production of fighter version of Yak-7UTI.
- Several other Yak-1 variants did not receive special designations. These include prototypes with Klimov VK-106 and Klimov VK-107 engines, production aircraft capable of carrying external fuel tanks, production aircraft with the ability to carry 6 × RS-82 rockets or 2 × 100 kg (220 lb) bombs, and lightened versions for air defense.

== Operators ==
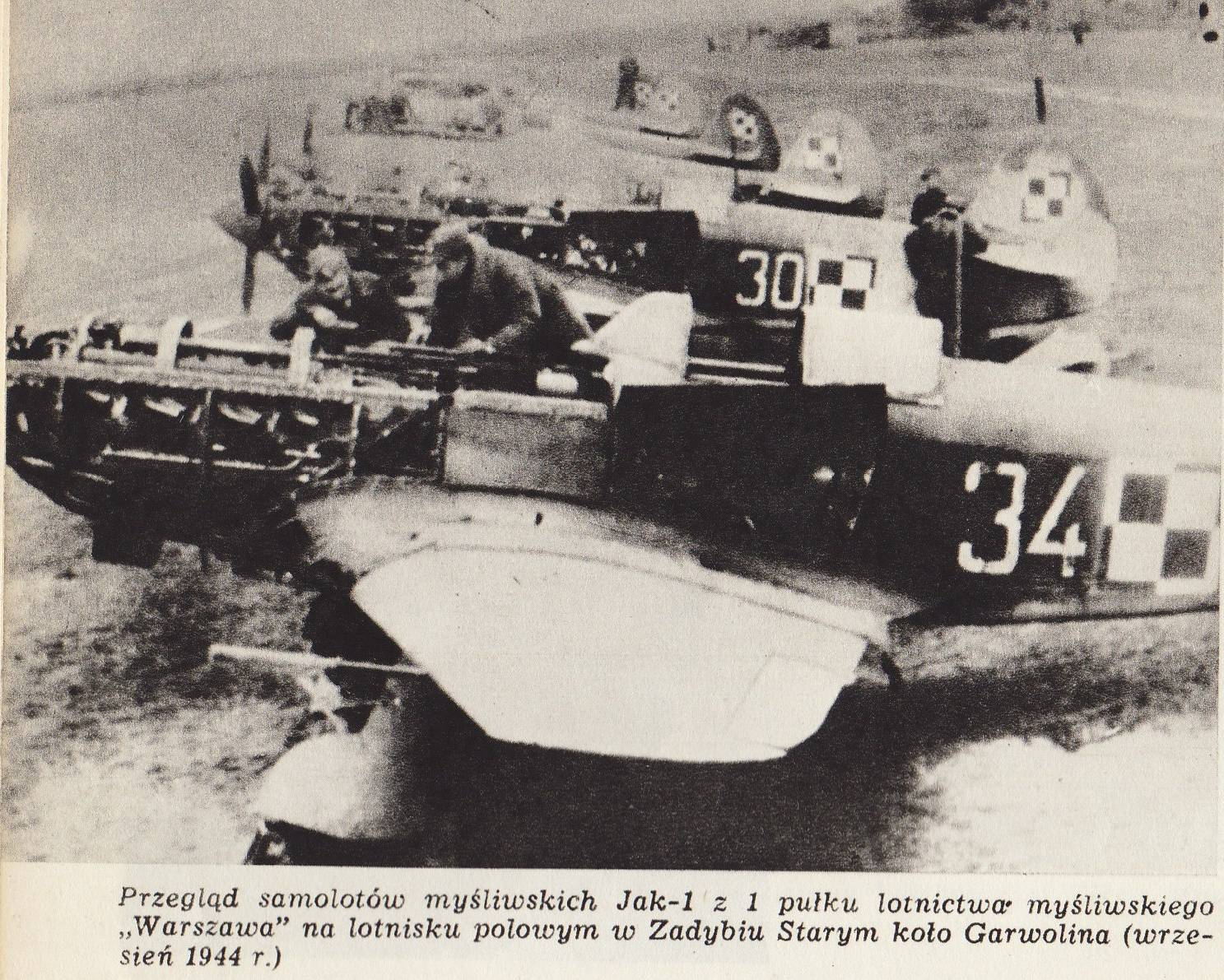
Airfield of 1 Pułk Lotnictwa Myśliwskiego in Stare Zadybie in September 1944. Yakovlev Yak-9 aircraft are being serviced.

France

- Free French Air Force
  - Normandie-Niemen Fighter Squadron

Poland

- Air Force of the Polish Army
  - 1st Polish Fighter Regiment "Warsaw"

Soviet Union

- Soviet Air Force

Yugoslavia

- SFR Yugoslav Air Force – 103 aircraft in 1944–1950
  - 111th Fighter Aviation Regiment (1944–1948)
  - 113th Fighter Aviation Regiment (1944–1948)
  - 112th Fighter Aviation Regiment (1944–1945)
  - 2nd Training Aviation Regiment (1946–1948)
  - 101st Fighter-Training Aviation Regiment (1948–1950)
  - 104th Training Aviation Regiment (1948–1950)

== Specifications (Yak-1b) ==
Yakovlev Yak-1 fighter.

Data from Dimensions from OKB Yakovlev, weights and performance from Yakovlev Aircraft since 1924

General characteristics

- Crew: 1
- Length: 8.48 m (27 ft 10 in)
- Wingspan: 10.0 m (32 ft 10 in)
- Height: 2.64 m (8 ft 8 in)
- Wing area: 17.15 m^{2} (184.6 sq ft)
- Airfoil: root: Clark YH (14%); tip: Clark YH (10%)
- Empty weight: 2,316 kg (5,106 lb)
- Max takeoff weight: 2,884 kg (6,358 lb)
- Powerplant: 1 × Klimov M-105PF V-12 liquid-cooled piston engine, 940 kW (1,260 hp) at 700 m (2,300 ft)
- Propellers: 3-bladed constant-speed propeller

Performance

- Maximum speed: 592 km/h (368 mph, 320 kn) at 4,900 m (16,100 ft)
- Range: 700 km (430 mi, 380 nmi)
- Service ceiling: 10,050 m (32,970 ft)
- Time to altitude: 5.4 min to 5,000 m (16,000 ft)
- Wing loading: 150 kg/m^{2} (31 lb/sq ft)
- Take-off run: 340 m (1,120 ft)
- Landing run: 560 m (1,840 ft)

Armament

- Guns: 1 × 20 mm (0.79 in) ShVAK cannon and 1 × 12.7 mm (0.50 in) Berezin UBS machine gun.

== See also ==
Related development

- Yakovlev Yak-7
- Yakovlev Yak-9
- Yakovlev Yak-3

Aircraft of comparable role, configuration, and era

- Curtiss P-40 Warhawk
- Hawker Hurricane
- Macchi C.202
- Messerschmitt Bf 109
- Rogožarski IK-3
- Supermarine Spitfire

Related lists

- List of aircraft of World War II

== Bibliography ==
- Angelucci, Enzo and Paolo Matricardi. World Aircraft: World War II, Volume II (Sampson Low Guides). Maidenhead, UK: Sampson Low, 1978. ISBN 978-0-562-00096-0.
- Bergström, Christer. Bagration to Berlin: The Final Air Battles in the East, 1944–1945. Hersham, UK: Classic Publications, 2008. ISBN 978-1-903223-91-8. OCLC 213447805
- Bock, Robert, and Wojtek Matusiak. Yak-1, Yak-3. Gdansk: AJ-Press, 1998. OCLC 846504236
- Donald, David and Jon Lake, eds. Encyclopedia of World Military Aircraft. London: AIRtime Publishing, 1996. ISBN 978-1-880588-24-6. Reprinted from World Air Power Journal. OCLC 46081988
- Drabkin, Artem. The Red Air Force at War: Barbarossa and The Retreat to Moscow, Recollections of Fighter Pilots on the Eastern Front. Barnsley, South Yorkshire, UK: Pen & Sword Military, 2007. ISBN 978-1-84415-563-7. OCLC 479028927
- Ethell, Jeffrey L. Aircraft of World War II: Glasgow, Harper Collins Publisher, 1995. ISBN 978-0-00-470849-2.
- Gordon, Yefim and Dmitri Khazanov. Soviet Combat Aircraft of the Second World War, Volume One: Single-Engined Fighters. Earl Shilton, Leicester, UK: Midland Publishing Ltd., 1998. ISBN 978-1-85780-083-8.
- Gordon, Yefim. Soviet Air Power in World War 2. London: Midland Publishing, 2008. ISBN 978-1-857-80304-4
- Gordon, Yefim, Dmitry Komissarov and Sergey Komissarov. OKB Yakovlev: A History of the Design Bureau and its Aircraft. Hinkley, UK: Midland Publishing, 2005. ISBN 1-85780-203-9.
- Green, William and Gordon Swanborough. WW2 Aircraft Fact Files: Soviet Air Force Fighters, Part 2. London: Macdonald and Jane's Publishers Ltd., 1978. ISBN 978-0-354-01088-7.
- Gunston, Bill. Aircraft of World War 2. London: Octopus Books Limited, 1980. ISBN 978-0-7064-1287-1.
- Gunston, Bill. Encyclopedia of Russian Aircraft 1875–1995. London: Osprey, 1995. ISBN 978-1-85532-405-3.
- Gunston, Bill. The Illustrated Directory of Fighting Aircraft of World War II. London: Salamander Book Limited, 1998. ISBN 978-1-84065-092-1.
- Gunston, Bill and Yefim Gordon. Yakovlev Aircraft since 1924. London, UK: Putnam Aeronautical Books, 1997. ISBN 1-55750-978-6.
- Kopenhagen, W., ed. Das große Flugzeug-Typenbuch (in German). Stuggart, Germany: Transpress, 1987. ISBN 978-3-344-00162-9.
- Jackson, Robert. Aircraft of World War II: Development, Weaponry, Specifications. Leicester, UK: Amber Books, 2003. ISBN 978-1-85605-751-6.
- Liss, Witold. The Yak 9 Series (Aircraft in Profile number 185). Leatherhead, Surrey, UK: Profile Publications Ltd., 1967. OCLC 442186799.
- Matricardi, Paolo. Aerei Militari: caccia e ricognitori. (in Italian) Milano, Mondadori Electa S.p.A., 2006. OCLC 799637978.
- Mellinger, George. Yakovlev Aces of World War 2. Botley, UK: Osprey Publishing Ltd., 2005. ISBN 978-1-84176-845-8.
- Morgan, Hugh. Gli assi Sovietici della Seconda guerra mondiale (in Italian). Edizioni del Prado/Osprey Aviation, 1999. ISBN 978-84-8372-203-9.
- Morgan, Hugh. Soviet Aces of World War 2. London: Reed International Books Ltd., 1997. ISBN 978-1-85532-632-3.
- Шавров В.Б. История конструкций самолетов в СССР 1938–1950 гг. (3 изд.). Kniga: Машиностроение, 1994 (Shavrov, V.B. Istoriia konstruktskii samoletov v SSSR, 1938–1950 gg.,3rd ed. History of Aircraft Design in the USSR: 1938–1950). Kniga, Russia: Mashinostroenie, 1994. ISBN 978-5-217-00477-5.
- Snedden, Robert. World War II Combat Aircraft. Bristol, UK: Parragon Books, 1997. ISBN 978-0-7525-1684-4.
- Stapfer, Hans-Heiri. Yak Fighters in Action (Aircraft number 78). Carrollton, Texas: Squadron/Signal Publications, Inc., 1986. ISBN 978-0-89747-187-9.
- Степанец А.Т. Истребители ЯК периода Великой Отечественной войны. Kniga: Машиностроение, 1992. (Stepanets, A.T. Istrebiteli Yak perioda Velikoi Otechestvennoi voiny (Yak Fighters of the Great Patriotic War). Kniga, Russia: Mashinostroenie, 1992. ISBN 978-5-217-01192-6.
- Williams, Anthony G. and Emmanuel Gustin. Flying Guns: The Development of Aircraft Guns, Ammunition and Installations 1933–45. Ramsbury, UK: Airlife, 2003. ISBN 978-1-84037-227-4.
- Christer Bergstrom, Andrey Dikov & Vlad Antipov, Black Cross – Red Star. Air War over the Eastern Front. Volume 3. Everything for Stalingrad. Eagle Editions Ltd., 2006. ISBN 978-0-935553-48-2.
- Mijail Yurevich Bykov, "Асы Великой Отечественной Войны: Самие ресултативные лётчики 1941–1945 гг." (Asy Velikoy Otechestvennoy Voyny. Samye resultativnye liotchiki 1941–45 gg = "Aces of the Great Patriotic War: The Pilots with the better results 1941–1945"), Yauza-EKSMO, Moscow, 2008.
