= Hispano-Suiza 12Z =

French aircraft engine during WWII

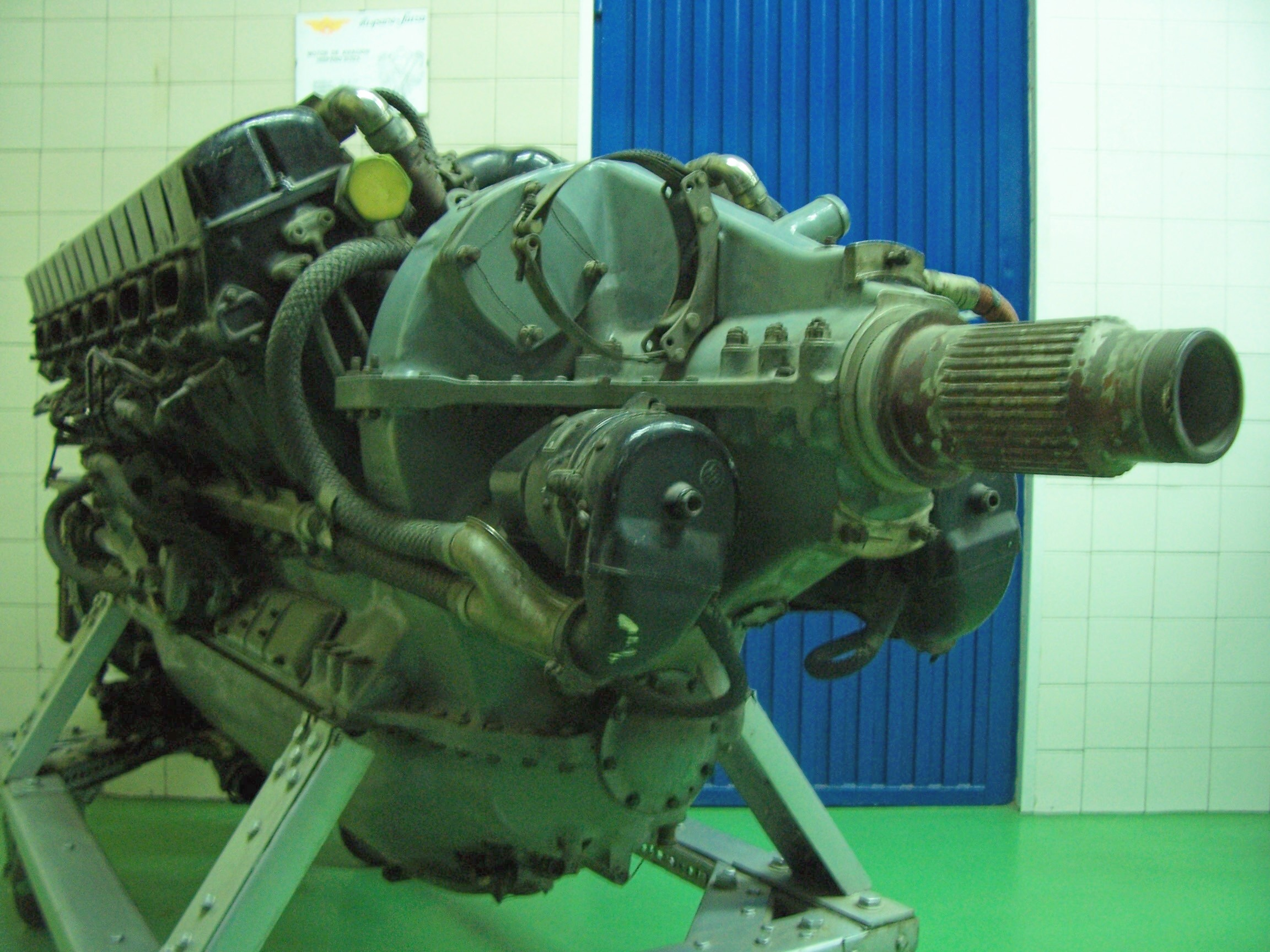
- Type: V-12 piston aero engine
- National origin: France
- Manufacturer: Hispano-Suiza
- First run: 1939
- Major applications: Arsenal VB 10; Hispano Aviación HA-1112; Ikarus S-49C
- Manufactured: 1944-1955
- Number built: 400
- Developed from: Hispano-Suiza 12Y

The 12Z, designated Type 89 by the company, was the final production evolution of the series of Hispano-Suiza V-12 aircraft engines. The Z model was in the middle of development when France fell to the Germans during World War II. A small number were produced before and during the war but following the occupation of Vichy France, the German occupation government did not allow full-scale production to start. After the war development would resume and small numbers were built to equip new designs, but the rapid introduction of the jet engine ended further development.

== Design and development ==
The 12Z differed from the earlier 12Y primarily in the use of four valves per cylinder operated by dual overhead cams, as opposed to two valves operated by a single camshaft. This gave the cylinders considerably better volumetric efficiency and faster operation, raising the RPM from 2,400 to 2,700. As with the later variants of the 12Y, the engine was designed to run on 100 octane fuel as well as operate at a higher 7.0:1 compression ratio. After the initial prototypes, fuel injectors built by Lavalette-Bosch would replace the original carburetors, raising the power from 1,000 to 1,300 hp (750 to 970 kW) at sea level.

The engine continued to use a single-stage, single-speed centrifugal supercharger and therefore lacked the all-altitude performance of German and British designs. But swapping the mediocre HS No.1 supercharger for the larger Szydlowsky-Planiol supercharger tuned for a higher critical altitude improved high-altitude performance considerably, delivering 1,500 hp (1,120 kW) at 6,400 m (21,000 ft) as opposed to 930 hp (690 kW) at 900 m (3,000 ft) for the 12Y-45.

Small prototype runs started in 1939, and were fitted to the French Air Force's front-line fighter aircraft, the M.S.410 and D.520, creating the M.S.450 and D.524 respectively. Production of the main model, the 12Zter, was still not ready at the time of the armistice when the factory had to move from Bois-Colombes to Tarbes. The earliest full-scale production order of 70 engines was placed in 1941, intended to support the first half of an order for 105 D.520Zs that was not permitted by the occupation government. Initial production instead was undertaken in Hispano-Suiza's Spanish factories in Barcelona where they were intended for the HA-1109. In 1943, La Hispano-Suiza received an order for 120 engines from the Spanish Air Force, but by late 1947 only 50 were completed. Rather than operate with 100/130 octane fuel as used by the French, the Spanish 12Zs were tuned to operate with 92 octane fuel. The lower grade fuel the power dropped slightly to 1,280 hp (950 kW) at 2,600 rpm (1,479 hp (1,100 kW) maximum take-off). Of these first 50 12Zs, three would be given to France post-war to speed up aircraft development.

Development would continue in Barcelona after the occupation of Southern France in 1942, but then would return to France after liberation in 1944. With the reestablishment of Hispano-Suiza in France, development and production would quickly pick back up in 1945 with the 12Z-17 family of engines and end in 1950 after producing about 200 engines. Spanish production would continue in 1948 with Hispano-Suiza partnered with ENASA for an order of 280 new 12Z-17s and 50 rebuilt 12Z-M. Of the 70 incomplete engines from the prior order, ENASA delivered 12 12Zs by 1950 and converted 58 to 12Z-Ms. Due to poor reliability and schedule issues, the order for 280 engines was reduced to 100, and only 104 12Z-17s were delivered by 1955 when the contract was canceled.

== Variants ==
With development and production being split between La Hispano Suiza of Barcelona and Hispano Suiza of Bois-Colombes and Tarbes, there were multiple designations for the same model created for the 12Z and its variants. Spanish serial numbers were in the 50XXX range and French serial numbers were in the 10XXX range.

=== Type 89 ===
12Z-01
Carbureted prototypes fitted with a single speed HS No.1 supercharger, first ran in 1939, for the D.524, MS.450, and later the D.520Z prototype.
12Zbis
Carbureted design fitted with a single speed Szydlowsky-Planiol (Turbomeca) supercharger proposed for the CAPRA R-80 trimotor.
12Zter
Known as just the 12Z by the Spanish Air Force and, incorrectly, as the 12Z-89 internally by Hispano Aviación and the Barcelona factory. First fuel injected variant for the VG 39, HS-50 prototype, second VB 10 prototype, and HA-1109J.
12Z-17
Main production variant fitted with a single speed Turbomeca supercharger. For the Bre.482 and SE.520Z prototypes, in service with S-49C and HA-1109K/1110K/1112K.
12Z-18
12Z-17 but opposite turning.
12Z-A
1944 design from Spain fitted with a 2-speed HS No.2 supercharger, proposed for a large-wing Hispano HS-50 variant.
12Z-B
1944 design from Spain fitted with a 2-stage, intercooled supercharger.
12Z-T
Fitted with Hispano-Boverli (HISBO) turbocharger, planned for Amiot 357.
12Z-M
12Zter rebuilt to 12Z-17 standard, not moteur-canon capable.
12Z-1
Also called the 12Z-I, prototypes fitted with a 2-speed HS No.3bis supercharger, planned for SE.520Z production models.
12Z-11
Also called the 12Z-II, design fitted with a 2-speed Turbomeca supercharger, proposed for enhanced CASA 2.111 or S-49 variants.

=== Type 91 ===
12Z-15
12Z-17 fitted with a larger 340 mm output gear instead of 300 mm, dedicated variant for VB 10.
12Z-16
12Z-18 fitted with a larger 340 mm output gear instead of 300 mm, dedicated variant for VB 10.

== Applications ==
- Arsenal VB 10
- Arsenal VG 39
- Breguet 482
- Hispano Aviación HA-1112
- Ikarus S-49C
- Morane-Saulnier M.S.450
- SNCASE SE.520Z — Development of the: Dewoitine D.520 Z prototype.

== Specifications (12Z-1) ==
Data from

=== General characteristics ===
- Type: V-12 60° liquid-cooled, gear driven supercharged four stroke piston engine
- Bore: 150mm (5.9in)
- Stroke: 170mm (6.69in)
- Displacement: 36.05 litres (2,199.9 cu in)
- Length: 2,384mm (93.8in)
- Width: 744mm (29.3in)
- Height: 1,074mm (42.3in)
- Dry weight: 620kg (1,367lb)
- Hollow propeller shaft to accommodate a cannon barrel

=== Components ===
- Valvetrain: Two intake and two sodium-cooled exhaust valves per cylinder actuated by dual overhead camshafts
- Supercharger: Gear-driven single-stage two-speed centrifugal type supercharger with automatic boost control - ratios 6.36:1 and 9.38:1
- Fuel system: Direct fuel injection @ 40 kgf/cm² (570 psi) 2x Lavalette P511-AS2 6-plunger injection pumps with 1x Lavalette KFD injector per cylinder
- Fuel type: 100/130-octane rating gasoline
- Oil system: Dry sump, pressure feed @ 5 kgf/cm² (70 psi), 20.5 centistokes (100 S.U. secs) viscosity oil
- Cooling system: Ethylene Glycol/water mix
- Reduction gear: Spur reduction gear ratio 0.6:1
- Air Equipment 1525 compressed gas starting system

=== Performance ===
- Power output:
  - Take-off: 1,342 kW (1,800 hp) @ 1,150mm (45.3in)Hg boost @ 2,800rpm
  - Military, low: 1,193 kW (1,600 hp) @ 2,500 m (8,202 ft) @ 2,800rpm
  - Military, high: 984 kW (1,320 hp) @ 8,000 m (26,247 ft) @ 2,800rpm
  - Cruising, low: 1,193 kW (1,600 hp) @ 3,000 m (9,843 ft) @ 2,100rpm
  - Cruising, high: 1,193 kW (1,600 hp) @ 5,600 m (18,373 ft) @ 2,100rpm
- Specific power: @ take-off power - 37.22kW/L (0.818hp/(cu in))
- Compression ratio: 7.0:1
- Specific fuel consumption: 0.29kg/(kW h) (0.48lb/(hp h))
- Oil consumption: 0.006 kg/(kW h) (0.018lb/(hp h))
- Power-to-weight ratio: @take-off power - 2.16kW/kg (1.32hp/lb)
- B.M.E.P. (Brake mean effective pressure) 16.3 kgf/cm² (232 psi)

== See also ==
Related development

- Hispano-Suiza 12Y
- Klimov VK-103
- Klimov VK-104
- Klimov VK-105P
- Klimov VK-106
- Klimov VK-107

Related lists

- List of aircraft engines
