= Beriev MBR-7 =

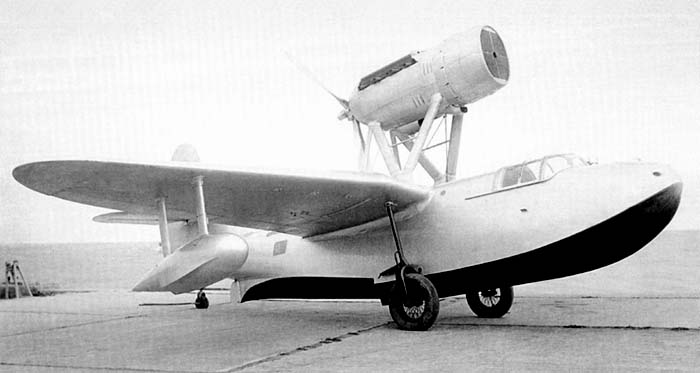
- Beriev MBR-7 in 1939

General information
- Type: Short-range reconnaissance bombing flying boat
- National origin: Soviet Union
- Manufacturer: Beriev

History
- First flight: 1939

The Beriev MBR-7 (sometimes Beriev MS-8) was a Soviet short-range reconnaissance/bomber flying boat developed by the Beriev design bureau at Taganrog. It was designed as a successor to the MBR-2 but did not go into production due to lack of engines.

== Development ==
The MBR-7 (Morskoy Blizhnii Razvedchik - naval short-range reconnaissance) was a similar configuration to the earlier MBR-2 but was a more advanced design. A mainly wooden cantilever shoulder-wing monoplane flying-boat. The Klimov M-103 inline piston engine was mounted on struts above the wing driving a pusher propeller. The pilot in an enclosed cockpit in the nose had access to a fixed forward-firing machine gun, the observer/gunner sat underneath a glazed canopy. The observers canopy slid forward to access a pintle-mounted ShKAS machine-gun.

It had an excellent performance but due to the lack of supply of Klimov engines the decision was made to continue building the MBR-2 and the MBR-7 did not go into production.

== Operators ==
Soviet Union

- Soviet Navy

== Specifications ==
Data from Orbis.

General characteristics

- Crew: 2 (pilot, observer/gunner
- Length: 10.6 m (34 ft 9 in)
- Wingspan: 13.0 m (42 ft 8 in)
- Wing area: 13.0 m^{2} (140 sq ft)
- Powerplant: 1 × Klimov M-103 V-12 liquid-cooled piston engine, 710 kW (950 hp)

Performance

- Maximum speed: 376 km/h (234 mph, 203 kn) at 4,300 m (14,100 ft)
- Range: 1,215 km (755 mi, 656 nmi)
- Service ceiling: 8,500 m (27,900 ft)

Armament

- Guns: one fixed and one flexible-mounted 7.63 mm (0.300 in) ShKAS machine-gun.
- Bombs: 500 kg (1,100 lb)

== See also ==
Related lists

- List of flying boats and floatplanes
