= Klimov M-105 =

V-12 piston aircraft engine

M-105
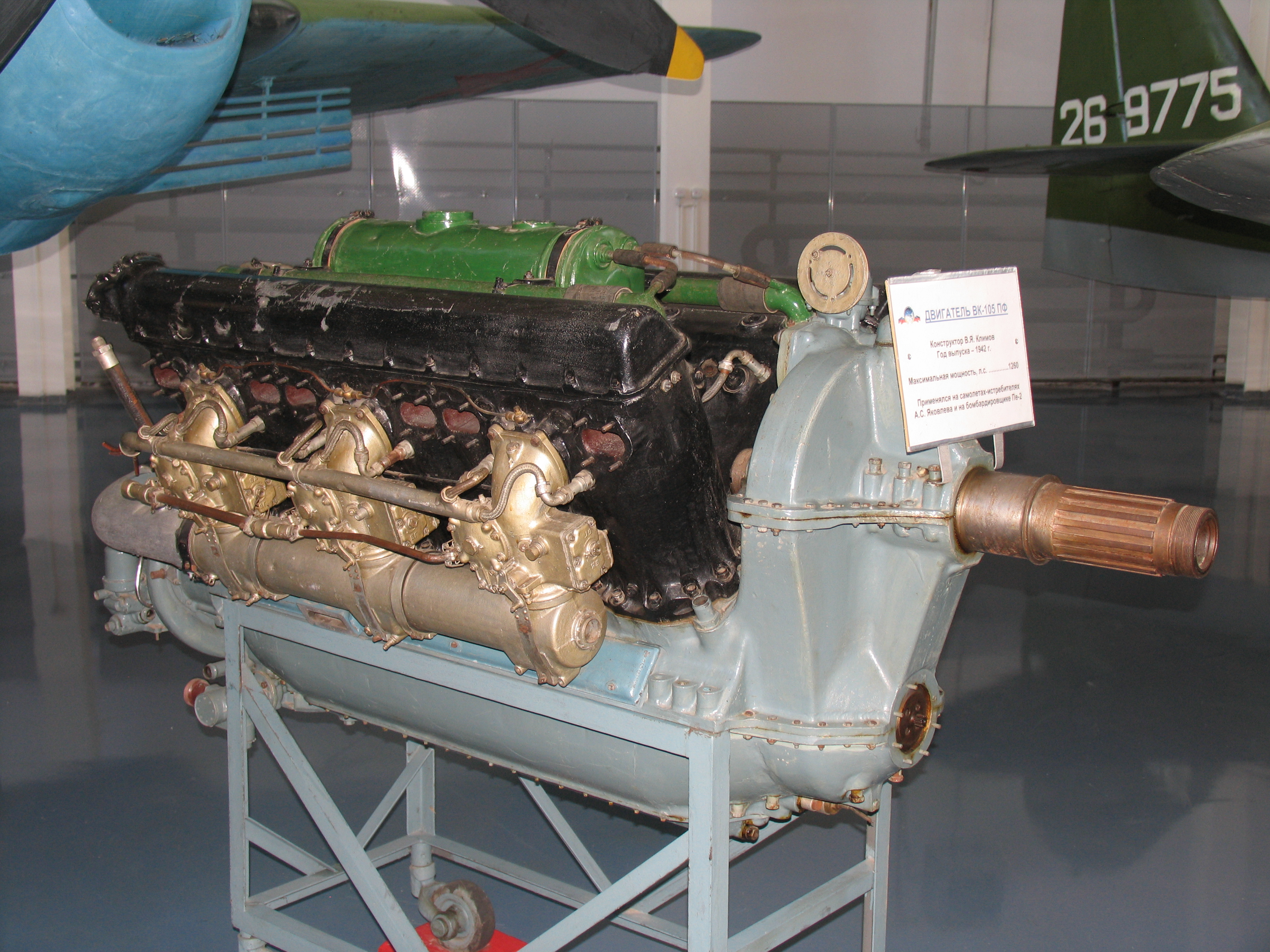
- A VK-105PF engine in Central Air Force Museum (Moscow)
- Type: V12
- National origin: Soviet Union
- Manufacturer: Klimov
- First run: 1938
- Major applications: LaGG-3; Petlyakov Pe-2; Yakovlev Yak-1; Yakovlev Yak-9; Yakovlev Yak-3
- Number built: c. 129,000
- Developed from: Klimov M-103
- Developed into: Klimov VK-106

The Klimov M-105 was a V12 liquid-cooled piston aircraft engine used by Soviet aircraft during World War II. Most versions produced about 1,100 horsepower (820 kW), making them competitive with other early-war designs like the Rolls-Royce Merlin and Daimler-Benz DB 601. Almost 130,000 were produced, and best known as the engines of the Petlyakov Pe-2 and Pe-3, and the long line of Yakovlev fighters.

== Development ==
The M-105, designed in 1940, drew heavily on Klimov's experience with the Hispano-Suiza 12Y which they license-built as the M-100. In addition to a two-speed supercharger, the M-105 had several improvements like two intake valves per cylinder and a counterbalanced crankshaft. The M-105 was the first Klimov V-12 engine design to use reverse-flow cylinder heads, forcing the induction system to be placed on the outside of the cylinder banks, with the exhaust system also exiting from the outboard side, with twin sets of "siamesed" exhaust ports adjacent to each other. About 129,000 M-105 and its variants were built.

During the war, Klimov's engines were redesignated from "M" (for "motor," engine) to "VK" for the lead designer's initials.

== Variants ==
- M-105 - (1,100 horsepower (820 kW)) First version produced at the end of 1939. Installed on some pre-war fighters.
- M-105P - (1,050 horsepower (780 kW)) First mass production engine (1940). Able to accept a motornaya pushka (моторная пушка - motor cannon)-mount autocannon in the "vee" between cylinder banks. Installed on the majority Soviet pre-war fighters - Yak-1, LaGG-1 and several experimental aircraft.
- M-105PA - (1,200 horsepower (890 kW)) Improved 1941 version.
- M-105PF (VK-105PF) - (1,260 horsepower (940 kW)) 1942 Modification with significantly increased power output at the expense of decreased critical altitude (high-altitude performance remained the same). In spite of Klimov's concerns about decreased service life, the engine was pressed into production at the insistence of Yakovlev, and further exploitation of "PF" version showed this was the right decision. The "PF" was installed on the most numerous versions of "Yak" fighters - Yak-1B, Yak-7B, Yak-9.
- VK-105PF2 & PF3 - (1,300 to 1,360 horsepower (970 to 1,015 kW)) Further increase in power output, which was believed to have exhausted the potential of the M-105 design for greater performance. The "PF2" was installed in the Yak-3 and Yak-9U.
- M-105PD - (1,170 horsepower (870 kW)) Engine with 2-stage E-100 turbocharger, experimental high-altitude version, unsuccessful prototype.
- M-105R - (1,100 horsepower (820 kW)) Decreased propeller reduction gear ratio for bomber aircraft. Installed on Pe-2, BB-22 (Yak-4) and others.
- M-105RA - (1,110 horsepower (830 kW)) M-105PA with decreased propeller reduction gear ratio for bomber aircraft.

== Applications ==
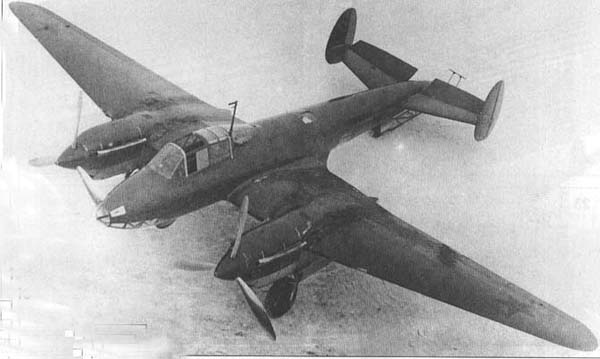
Petlyakov Pe-2

- Arkhangelsky Ar-2
- Bell P-39 Airacobra
- Curtiss P-40 Kittyhawk
- Ikarus S-49
- Lavochkin-Gorbunov-Gudkov LaGG-1
- Lavochkin-Gorbunov-Gudkov LaGG-3
- Mörkö-Morane
- Petlyakov Pe-2
- Petlyakov Pe-3
- Yakovlev Yak-1
- Yakovlev Yak-2
- Yakovlev Yak-3
- Yakovlev Yak-4
- Yakovlev Yak-7
- Yakovlev Yak-9
- Yermolayev Yer-2

== Specifications (VK-105) ==
Data from

=== General characteristics ===
- Type: Twelve-cylinder liquid-cooled 60° V12 engine
- Bore: 148mm (5.826 in)
- Stroke: 170mm (6.693 in)
- Displacement: 35.101 L (2,142.2 cu in)
- Length: 2,027 mm (79.8 in)
- Width: 777 mm (30.59 in)
- Height: 945 mm (37.20 in)
- Dry weight: 575 kg (1,266 lb)

=== Components ===
- Valvetrain: Two intake valves and one sodium-filled exhaust valve per cylinder actuated via a single overhead camshaft per bank.
- Supercharger: Gear-driven two-speed centrifugal type compressor. Gear ratios: 7.78:1 (1st speed) 11.0:1 (2nd speed). Maximum boost for take-off: 965 mmHg (128.7 kPa). Maximum boost at altitude: 920 mmHg (123 kPa). Emergency boost (maximum 2 minutes): 1,100 mmHg (150 kPa) at 2,800 rpm. Critical altitude: 2,000 m (6,600 ft) at 1st speed, 4,000 m (13,000 ft) at 2nd speed.
- Fuel system: Six K-105 carburettors (License copy of Solex-Hispano 56SVC self-adjusted carburettor), three on each outboard side of cylinder banks
- Fuel type: 94 (minimum grade), 95 or 100 octane rating gasoline.
- Cooling system: Liquid-cooled
- Reduction gear: 1: 0.666 (1: 0.591 for M-105R)

=== Performance ===
- Power output:
- 820 kW (1,100 hp) at 2,700 rpm for take-off, boost rated at 965 mmHg (130 kPa)
- 782 kW (1,049 hp) at 2,700 rpm at 2,000 m (6,600 ft), boost rated at 920 mmHg (123 kPa) 820 kW (1,100 hp)
- 372 kW (499 hp) at 2,700 rpm at 9,500 m (31,200 ft)
- Specific power: 23.36 kW/L (0.513 hp/in³)
- Compression ratio: 7.0:1
- Specific fuel consumption: 328 g/(kW•h) (0.54 lb/(hp•h))
- Oil consumption: 11 g/(kW•h) (0.28 oz/(hp•h))
- Power-to-weight ratio: 1.42 kW/kg (0.86 hp/lb)

== See also ==
Related development

- Hispano-Suiza 12Z
- Klimov VK-103
- Klimov VK-104
- Klimov VK-106
- Klimov VK-107

Comparable engines

- Allison V-1710
- Daimler-Benz DB 601
- Mikulin AM-35
- Rolls-Royce Merlin

Related lists

- List of aircraft engines
