= 8 cm Flz.-Rakete Oerlikon =

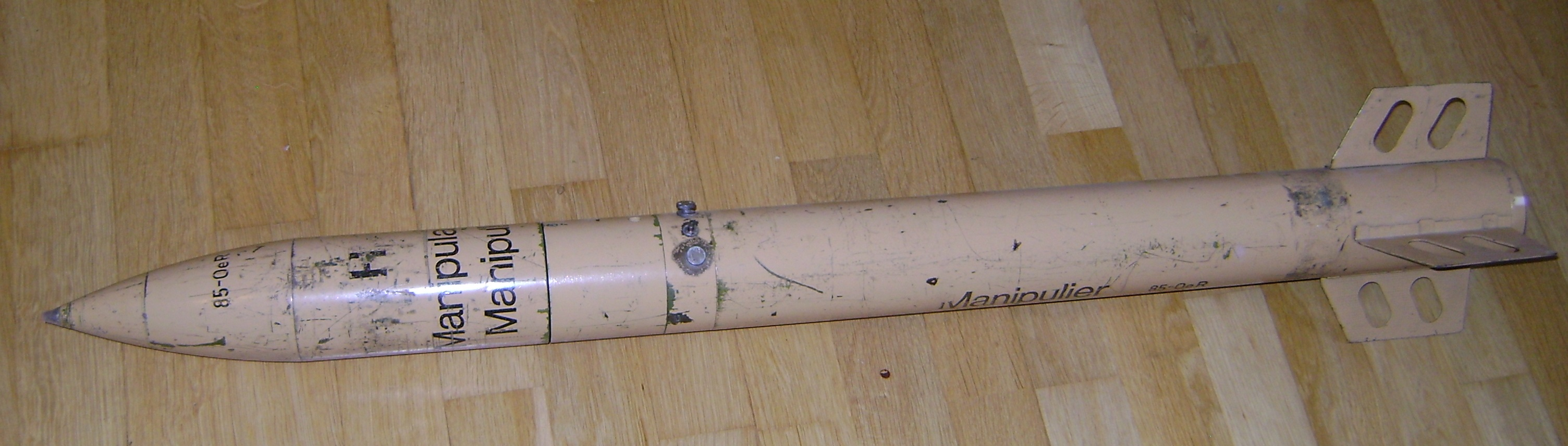
- 8 cm Flz.-Rakete Oerlikon Inert version
- Type: Unguided air-to-surface rocket
- Place of origin: Switzerland

Service history
- In service: until 1991
- Used by: Swiss Air Force

Production history
- Designed: 1947–1952
- Manufacturer: Oerlikon-Bührle
- Variants: HEF (impact fuze); HEF (proximity fuze); HEAT (25 cm penetration); Inert training

Specifications
- Mass: ca 10-12,3 kg without warhead
- Length: 600-1 050 mm (depending on variant)
- Diameter: 80 mm
- Caliber: 80 mm
- Muzzle velocity: 650-700 m/s
- Effective firing range: 1500 m (HEAT)
- Sights: Contrave

The Oerlikon-Bührle 8 cm Flz.-Rakete Oerlikon (8 cm aircraft rocket) is an 80-mm rocket produced in Switzerland by Oerlikon-Buehrle. Developed from 1947 to 1952 and used until 1991 by the Swiss Air Force under the name Oe85.

== Overview ==
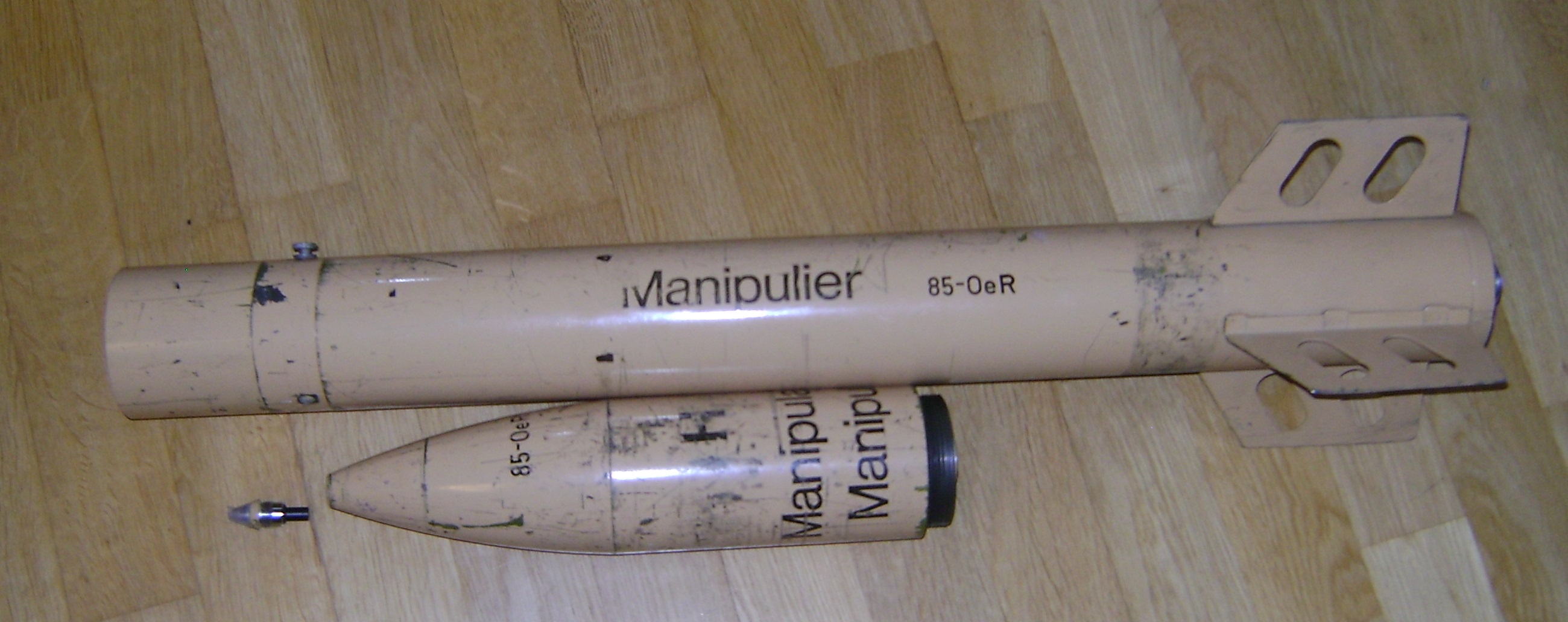
The three main parts of the rocket

The rocket consists essentially of three parts:

- The drive unit with the solid rocket fuel inside and four tail fins and two mounting devices with which the rocket is attached to the weapon carrier.
- The warhead, Optional is a high-explosive fragmentation and hollow-charge or for training an inert warhead.
- The impact fuse.

There is also a "Manipulier" (training / inert) version of the rocket, containing no explosives and no rocket propellant, but identical to the real projectile in shape, aerodynamic and weight.

The rocket was used on the de Havilland Venom and Hawker Hunter fighters. The use in the FFA P-16 was planned, but it was only used for trials and testing of the P-16 prototypes because these aircraft never went into serial production.

For the projectiles, there were three different weapons carrier / Pylons:

- Pylon for a single rocket
- Pylon for two rockets in tandem
- Pylon for four missiles on each pylon side in tandem

== External Pictures ==
- On aircraft fitted with 2 and 4 pylon
- various images of the rocket
