= Myasishchev DB-108 =

1940s Soviet experiment bomber aircraft

Myasishchyev DB-108
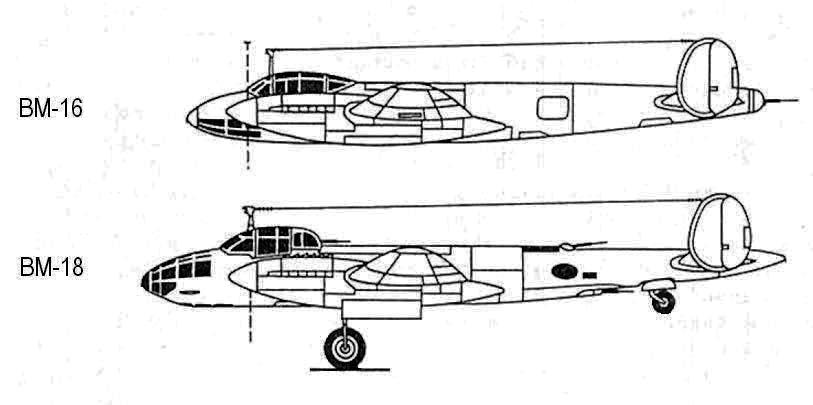

General information
- Type: Long range bomber
- National origin: USSR
- Designer: Vladimir Myasishchev
- Number built: 3

History
- First flight: 30 December 1944
- Developed from: Petlyakov Pe-2

The Myasishchev DB-108 was a 1940s Soviet experimental development of the Petlyakov Pe-2 bomber aircraft. Only three prototypes were built and only two of them flew.

== Design and development ==
After Vladimir Petlyakov's death in January 1942 Vladimir Mikhailovich Myasishchev continued the development of the Petlyakov Pe-2, beginning with the DB-108. DB stood for long range bomber and 108 was a NKVD, rather than design bureau, number. The three prototypes were identified by their designer's initials, VM.

All three had the same basic layout. Their cantilever wings were mid-mounted and had rectangular panels between roots and engines, with radiators in their leading edges. The engines were mounted ahead of the leading edges in long fairings that also housed the main landing gear. The oil radiators were nearby in the leading edges of the outer wing panels which tapered strongly to semi-elliptical tips and had about 5° dihedral.

Their fuselages were oval in cross-section and tapered rearwards to pointed extremities. Each had a glazed or semi-glazed nose and a cockpit, under raised, multi-part glazing, placed ahead of the leading edge. At the rear tetragonal plan, mid-mounted tailplanes with marked dihedral carried vertical endplate fins which, with their rudders, were roughly oval in profile. The trailing edges of broad chord elevators were slightly curved, with inboard trim tabs. A retractable tailwheel was positioned just ahead of the tailplane leading edge.

The first prototype, the VM-16, was crewed by just a pilot and navigator/gunner/bomb-aimer, seated alongside but facing rearwards. He remotely operated a 12.7 mm (0.50 in) calibre tail gun from this position but went into the semi-glazed nose for bombing. Development concentrated on increasing defensive armament. The ground-tested but unflown second prototype, the VM-17, added another crew member to operate its four guns. It was eventually modified into the Myasishchyev VB-109, described briefly below. The final prototype, the VM-18, had a 16% increase in span and 10% in length, with a fourth crew member in an extended rear cockpit to operate its guns, one in his cockpit and two more in remotely operated dorsal and ventral barbettes. There was also a forward firing gun.

The VM-16 was first flown on 30 December 1944. The VM-17 was not flown until late 1945, after modification into the VB-109; the VM-18 was flown in 1946, though flight tests were not completed before programme cancellation.

== Variants ==
Data from Russian Aircraft 1875-1995

VM-16
Two-seater. Single remotely operated 12.7 mm (0.50 in) calibre tail gun. First flown 30 December 1944. One only.

VM-17
Three crew and extra armament. Empty weight increased by 559 kg (1,232 lb) but dimensions unchanged. Ground-tested but unflown until converted into the VB-109. Four guns, three 20 mm (0.79 in) calibre, the other 12.7 mm (0.50 in). One only.

VM-18
Four crew, cockpit modified for gun. Span increased to 20.06 m (65 ft 10 in) and length to 15.02 m (49 ft 3 in). Four guns, one fixed, forward firing 20 mm (0.79 in) and the others 12.7 mm (0.50 in) calibre, rearward firing. It was flown in 1946 but its tests were not completed when the programme was abandoned. One only.

VB-109
Rebuilt two-seat VM-17, with the same span as the VM-16 and VM-17 and a length of 14.17 m (46 ft 6 in). It had two seats in a pressurized cabin and was more heavily armour-plated than its predecessors. There were two 20 mm (0.79 in) guns, one remotely operated in the tail as in the VM-16 and another fixed. It was intended to have upgraded, two-stage supercharged Klimov VK-109 engines, though interim Klimov VK-107As powered its first flight, made in late 1945. One only.

== Specifications (VM-16) ==
Data from Russian Aircraft 1875-1995.

General characteristics

- Crew: Two
- Length: 13.47 m (44 ft 2 in)
- Wingspan: 17.8 m (58 ft 5 in)
- Wing area: 43.0 m^{2} (463 sq ft)
- Empty weight: 6,953 kg (15,329 lb)
- Gross weight: 9,431 kg (20,792 lb)
- Powerplant: 2 × Klimov VK-108 liquid-cooled V-12 engine, 1,300 kW (1,800 hp) each
- Propellers: Four-bladed VISh-107

Performance

- Maximum speed: 583 km/h (362 mph, 315 kn) at sea level
- Combat range: 2,250 km (1,400 mi, 1,210 nmi) with 2,000 kg (4,400 lb)
- Service ceiling: 12,000 m (39,000 ft) service
- Time to altitude: 5 min to 5,000 m (16,000 ft)
- Take-off distance: 420 m (1,380 ft)
- Landing run: 485 m (1,591 ft) from 140 km/h (87 mph; 76 kn)

Armament

- Guns: One remotely controlled 12.7 mm (0.50 in) calibre tail gun
- Bombs: 2,000 kg (4,400 lb)

== See also ==
Related development

- Petlyakov Pe-2

Aircraft of comparable role, configuration, and era

- de Havilland Mosquito
- Junkers Ju 88
- Messerschmitt Bf 110
- Fokker G.I
- Lockheed P-38 Lightning
- Tupolev Tu-2

Related lists

- List of aircraft of World War II
- List of bomber aircraft
- List of military aircraft of the Soviet Union and the CIS
