= Klimov M-103 =

1930s Soviet piston aircraft engine

M-103
- Klimov M-103 on display at the Polish Aviation Museum
- Type: V12 inline engine
- Manufacturer: Klimov
- First run: October 1936
- Number built: 11,681
- Developed from: Klimov M-100
- Developed into: Klimov M-105

The Klimov M-103 is a V12 liquid-cooled piston aircraft engine used by Soviet aircraft during World War II. Offering around 1,000 hp for takeoff, it was used in a fairly small number of designs, with its greatest success being the Tupolev SB. It was soon replaced by the more powerful 1,100 hp Klimov M-105, which arrived in late 1939. Production continued until 1942, by which time almost twelve thousand had been delivered.

== Design and development ==
The M-103 was a further development of the Klimov M-100 engine that was itself a licensed copy of the French Hispano-Suiza 12Ybrs. It differed from both engines in a number of aspects such as increased compression ratio, increased supercharger ratio, increased rpm's, strengthened cylinder blocks, a new crankshaft, a more aggressive camshaft, and flat bottomed cylinders. Developed in 1936 it was ready for testing in October 1936. The first two models failed testing due to cracked cylinder blocks and the engine was resubmitted for testing in 1937. After passing its trials it was cleared for production in 1938 and 11,681 were produced until 1942 at its factory in Rybinsk. The M-103 was followed by the M-105.

== Variants ==
- M-103A - 148 mm rather than 150 mm bore cylinders.
- M-103P - A ShVAK cannon fitted to fire through the engine vee.
- M-103SP - A proposed version with two engines married to a common crankshaft.
- M-103G - With Glycol rather than water cooling.
- M-103A-TK - With an experimental Turbo-Supercharger
- M-103U - Improved service life variant.
- M-104 - Basically a M-103A with a two speed single stage supercharger for increased performance. 232 built.

== Applications ==
- Bolkhovitinov S
- Beriev MBR-7
- Polikarpov TsKB-44
- Polikarpov VIT-1 & VIT-2
- Tupolev SB
- Yakovlev Yak-2
- Yakovlev Yak-12
- Yakovlev Yak-22

== Specifications (M-103A) ==
Data from

=== General characteristics ===
- Type: Twelve-cylinder supercharged liquid-cooled 60° V12 engine
- Bore: 148 mm (5.826 in)
- Stroke: 170 mm (6.693 in)
- Displacement: 35.101 Liters (2,142.2 cu in)
- Length: 1,971 mm (77.6 in)
- Width: 764 mm (30.08 in)
- Height: 942 mm (37.08 in)
- Dry weight: 500 kg (1,101 lb)

=== Components ===
- Valvetrain: One intake and one sodium-filled exhaust valve per cylinder actuated via a single overhead camshaft per bank.
- Supercharger: Gear-driven single-speed centrifugal type compressor. Gear ratio: 11.0:1. Maximum boost for take-off: 1,100 mmHg (150 kPa). Maximum boost at altitude: 920 mmHg (123 kPa). Critical altitude: 13,000 ft (4,000 m)
- Fuel system: Six K-100A carburettors (license copy of Solex-Hispano 56S2 self-adjusted carburettor)
- Fuel type: 90 (minimum grade), 95 or 100 octane.
- Cooling system: Liquid-cooled
- Reduction gear: 2:3

=== Performance ===
- Power output:
- 750 kW (1,000 hp) at 2,450 rpm for take-off, boost rated at 1.44 atm (146 kPa)
- 720 kW (960 hp) at 2,400 rpm at 13,000 ft (4,000 m), boost rated at 1.21 atm (123 kPa)
- 370 kW (500 hp) at 2,450 rpm at 30,800 ft (9,400 m)
- Specific power: 21.22 kW/L (0.466 hp/in³)
- Compression ratio: 6.6:1
- Specific fuel consumption: 328 g/(kW•h) (0.54 lb/(hp•h))
- Oil consumption: 11 g/(kW•h) (0.28 oz/(hp•h))
- Power-to-weight ratio: 1.50 kW/kg (0.916 hp/lb)

== See also ==
Related development

- Hispano-Suiza 12Y
- Hispano-Suiza 12Z
- Klimov M-100
- Klimov M-105
- Klimov VK-106
- Klimov VK-107

Related lists

- List of aircraft engines
