= Klimov VK-106 =

1940s Soviet piston aircraft engine

VK-106
- Type: V12 inline engine
- Manufacturer: Klimov
- First run: 1943
- Number built: over 300 engines
- Developed from: Klimov M-105
- Developed into: Klimov VK-107

The Klimov VK-106 was an experimental liquid-cooled V12 piston aircraft engine intended for Soviet aircraft during World War II.

== Development ==
With the VK-105PF exhausting the potential of the M-105, Klimov prolonged its development into new VK-106 engine from 1941. Since air combat on the Eastern Front took place primarily at low altitudes under 4,000 m (13,000 ft) the new engine was built specifically for peak performance at those altitudes with a reduced compression ratio and a single-speed supercharger. Static testing was carried out from 27 October till 9 November 1942. Although reliable and easily installed in M-105-powered aircraft, VK-106 did not enter production because its cooling problems were not solved. Like M-105P, VK-106P could house an autocannon in the "vee" between the cylinder banks.

== Applications ==
- Yak-1b with M-106

== Specifications (VK-106-1sk) ==
Data from Kotelnikov

=== General characteristics ===
- Type: 12-cylinder supercharged liquid-cooled piston aircraft engine
- Bore: 148mm (5.83 in)
- Stroke: 170mm (6.69 in)
- Displacement: 35.08 liters (2,140 in³)
- Dry weight: 600 kg (1,320 lb)

=== Components ===
- Supercharger: Gear-driven single-stage single-speed centrifugal type supercharger
- Fuel type: 95-octane rating gasoline
- Cooling system: Liquid-cooled

=== Performance ===
- Power output:
- 1,007 kW (1,350 hp) at 2,600 rpm for takeoff
- 1,007 kW (1,350 hp) at 2,000 m (6,560 ft)
- Specific power: 28.8 kW/L (0.63 hp/in³)
- Compression ratio: 6.5:1
- Power-to-weight ratio: 1.68 kW/kg (1.02 hp/lb)

== See also ==
Related development

- Hispano-Suiza 12Y
- Hispano-Suiza 12Z
- Klimov VK-100
- Klimov VK-103
- Klimov VK-104
- Klimov VK-105P
- Klimov VK-107

Comparable engines

- Allison V-1710
- Daimler-Benz DB 601
- Junkers Jumo 211
- Mikulin AM-35
- Rolls-Royce Merlin

Related lists

- List of aircraft engines
