= Klimov VK-107 =

1940s Soviet piston aircraft engine

VK-107
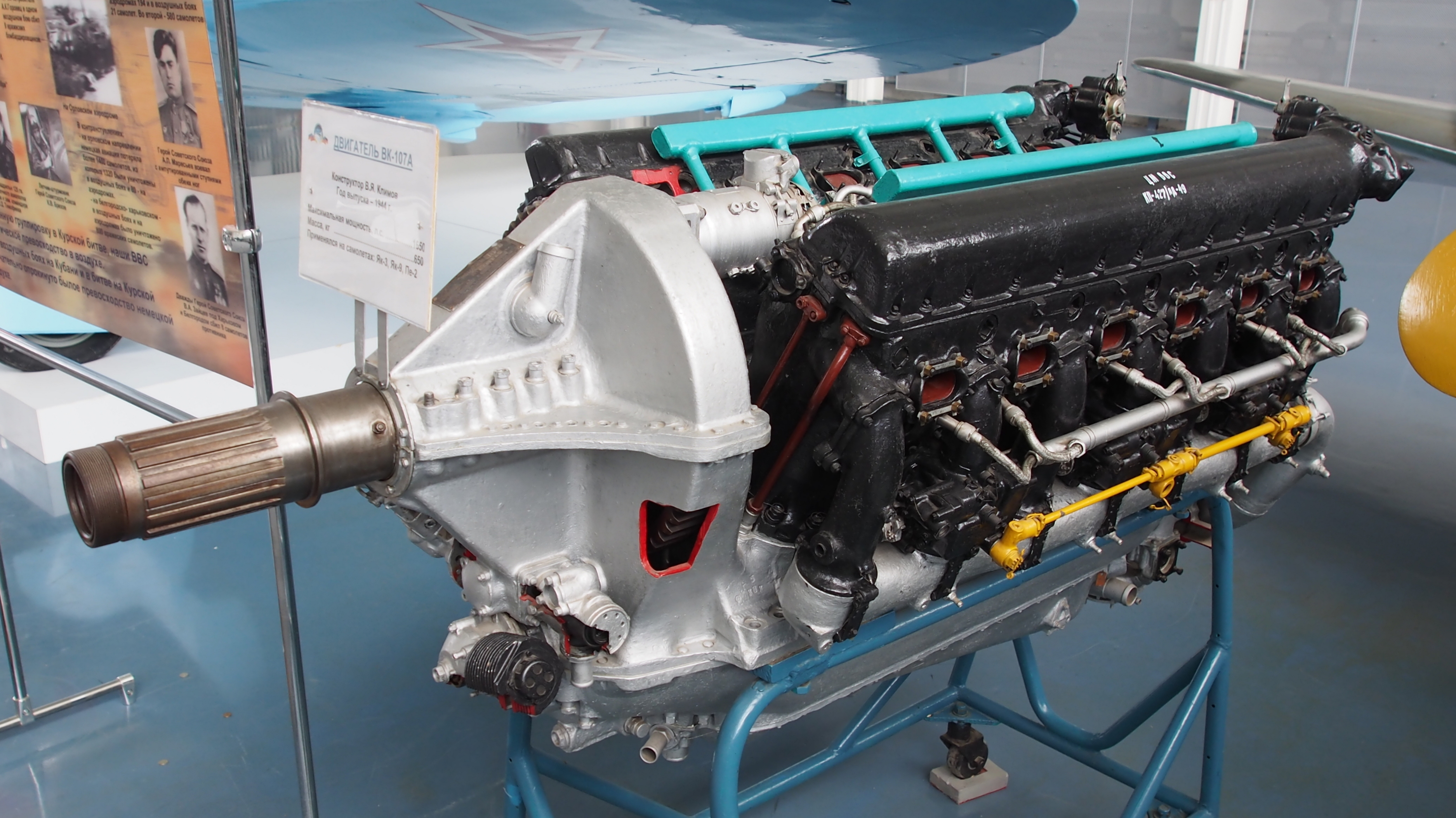
- VK-107A in Central Air Force Museum (Moscow)
- Type: V12 engine
- National origin: USSR
- Manufacturer: Klimov
- First run: 1942
- Major applications: Mikoyan-Gurevich MiG-7; Petlyakov Pe-2; Yakovlev Yak-3; Yakovlev Yak-9
- Number built: 7,902
- Developed from: M-105 and VK-106
- Developed into: Klimov VK-108

The Klimov VK-107 was a V12 liquid-cooled piston aircraft engine used by Soviet aircraft during World War II. It was a major update of the earlier Klimov M-105, adding four valves per cylinder and re-designing several components, allowing take-off power to be raised to 1,600 hp from the 105's 1,100 hp.

Although ready for production as early as 1942, the design was not put into widespread use as there was no pressing need for the design until the Germans introduced the Daimler-Benz DB 605 engine in 1943. Production examples began to arrive in 1944, and just under 8,000 had been produced by the war's end. It was not considered reliable and was also difficult to service, and saw little use other than among designs that had been designed for the M-105.

== Development ==
The VK-107 was developed from the M-105 and VK-106. To achieve a greater power output, each cylinder now had four valves (two intake and two exhaust), crankshaft and camshafts were completely revised, and a new supercharger design was implemented. Although the engine could have been ready for production as early as 1942, the Soviets' factories lacked the capacity to produce a brand new design. Thus, the less powerful Klimov VK-105PF and VK-105PF2 V12 engines were built instead. However, the appearance of Luftwaffe Messerschmitt Bf 109G with Daimler-Benz DB 605 engine in 1943 created an urgent demand for a more powerful engine.

The VK-107A was put into production in 1944 and was used on Yak-9U fighters. The engine was not well liked by either pilots or mechanics – it had a life expectancy of only 25 hours and war emergency power was almost never used for fear of decreasing this even more. The engine was also difficult to service, in part because its exhaust headers were on the inside of the cylinder banks, the reverse placement of most V-type liquid-cooled engine designs.

== Variants ==
Data from Aircraft engines of the World 1953 and Russian piston aero engines

M-107
(M-107P) Initial designation, produced 1941-1942; 686 built.
VK-107
Prototypes with take-off rating of 1,080 kW (1,450 hp)
VK-107A
1942 production version without water-injection with military (high) rating of 1,100 kW (1,500 hp) at 2800 rpm and 4,500 m (14,800 ft), remained in production until 1948
VK-107B
with water injection
VK-107R
version for hybrid piston-motorjet powered Mikoyan-Gurevich I-250 and Sukhoi Su-5 fighters fitted with the Kholshchevnikov VRDK
VK-107 coupled
A projected coupled powerplant driving contra-rotating propellers
VK-108
attempt to further develop VK-107 with a rating of 1,380 kW (1,850 hp) for takeoff, used on several Yakovlev Yak-3 and Myasishchev DB-108 prototypes but did not enter production.
VK-108F
Boosted VK-108
VK-109
1945-6 development of the VK-108, planned for use on the Myasishchev VB-109 bomber.

== Applications ==
- Mikoyan-Gurevich MiG-7
- Petlyakov Pe-2
- Yakovlev Yak-3
- Yakovlev Yak-9

== Specifications (VK-107B) ==
Data from Aircraft engines of the World 1953

=== General characteristics ===
- Type: 12-cylinder supercharged liquid-cooled Vee aircraft piston engine
- Bore: 148 mm (5.8 in)
- Stroke: 170 mm (6.7 in)
- Displacement: 35.08 L (2,141 cu in)
- Length: 2,030 mm (80 in)
- Width: 777 mm (30.6 in)
- Height: 960 mm (38 in)
- Dry weight: 620 kg (1,370 lb)
- Power boost:Water injection for take-off and combat boost

=== Components ===
- Valvetrain: Two intake and two exhaust valves per cylinder actuated via an overhead camshaft
- Supercharger: Single stage, two-speed, gear-driven centrifugal type supercharger with variable output impeller driven at 7.85:1 and 10:1.
- Fuel system: 6x K-105BP carburettors with automatic pressure regulation
- Fuel type: 95 Octane
- Oil system: Pressure feed at 5.9 bar (85 psi)
- Cooling system: Liquid-cooled
- Reduction gear: Spur gear 0.6:1 with hollow propeller shaft for cannon

=== Performance ===
- Power output: Take-off (wet): 1,300 kW (1,800 hp) at 2,800 rpm / 53.1 in (1,350 mm) / +11.6 lb (5.3 kg) boost

Take-off (dry): 1,200 kW (1,600 hp) at 2,800 rpm / 52.4 in (1,330 mm) / +11.2 lb (5.1 kg) boost
Military (low): 1,200 kW (1,600 hp) at 2,800 rpm / 1,700 m (5,600 ft) altitude
Military (high): 1,100 kW (1,500 hp) at 2,800 rpm / 6,000 m (19,700 ft) altitude
Normal (low): 1,110 kW (1,490 hp) at 2,600 rpm / 2,000 m (6,600 ft) altitude
Normal (high): 1,010 kW (1,350 hp) at 2,600 rpm / 5,000 m (16,400 ft) altitude

- Specific power: 38 kW/L (0.84 hp/cu in)
- Compression ratio: 7:1
- Specific fuel consumption: 0.29 kg/kWh (0.48 lb/(hp⋅h))
- Oil consumption: 0.011 kg/kWh (0.018 lb/(hp⋅h))
- Power-to-weight ratio: 0.46 kg/kW (0.76 lb/hp)
- BMEP: 16.4 bar (238 psi)

== See also ==
Related development

- Hispano-Suiza 12Y
- Hispano-Suiza 12Z
- Klimov VK-100
- Klimov VK-103
- Klimov VK-104
- Klimov VK-105P
- Klimov VK-106

Comparable engines

- Allison V-1710
- Daimler-Benz DB 605
- Rolls-Royce Griffon
- Rolls-Royce Merlin

Related lists

- List of aircraft engines
