= Tupolev ANT-53 =

ANT-53

General information
- Type: Airliner
- National origin: Soviet Union
- Manufacturer: Tupolev
- Designer: Vladimir Petlyakov
- Status: paper project only
- Primary user: Aeroflot (intended)
- Number built: 0

History
- Developed from: Tupolev TB-7

The Tupolev ANT-53 was a late 1930s project for a passenger aircraft by the Tupolev Design Bureau.

== Development and design ==
The Tupolev ANT-53 was developed as an airliner derivative of the Tupolev TB-7 heavy bomber, effectively constituting the Soviet counterpart to the Boeing 307 Stratoliner pressurized airliner. The pressurized cabin of the ANT-53 would have accommodated 48 passengers or 6 tons of cargo, and power was to be supplied by either 4 Mikulin AM-34FRNV or 4 Tumansky M-85 engines. However, development was abandoned due to shortages of aerospace engineers resulting from the 1937-1938 Great Purge.
