= Petlyakov Pe-2 =

Soviet dive bomber aircraft

Pe-2
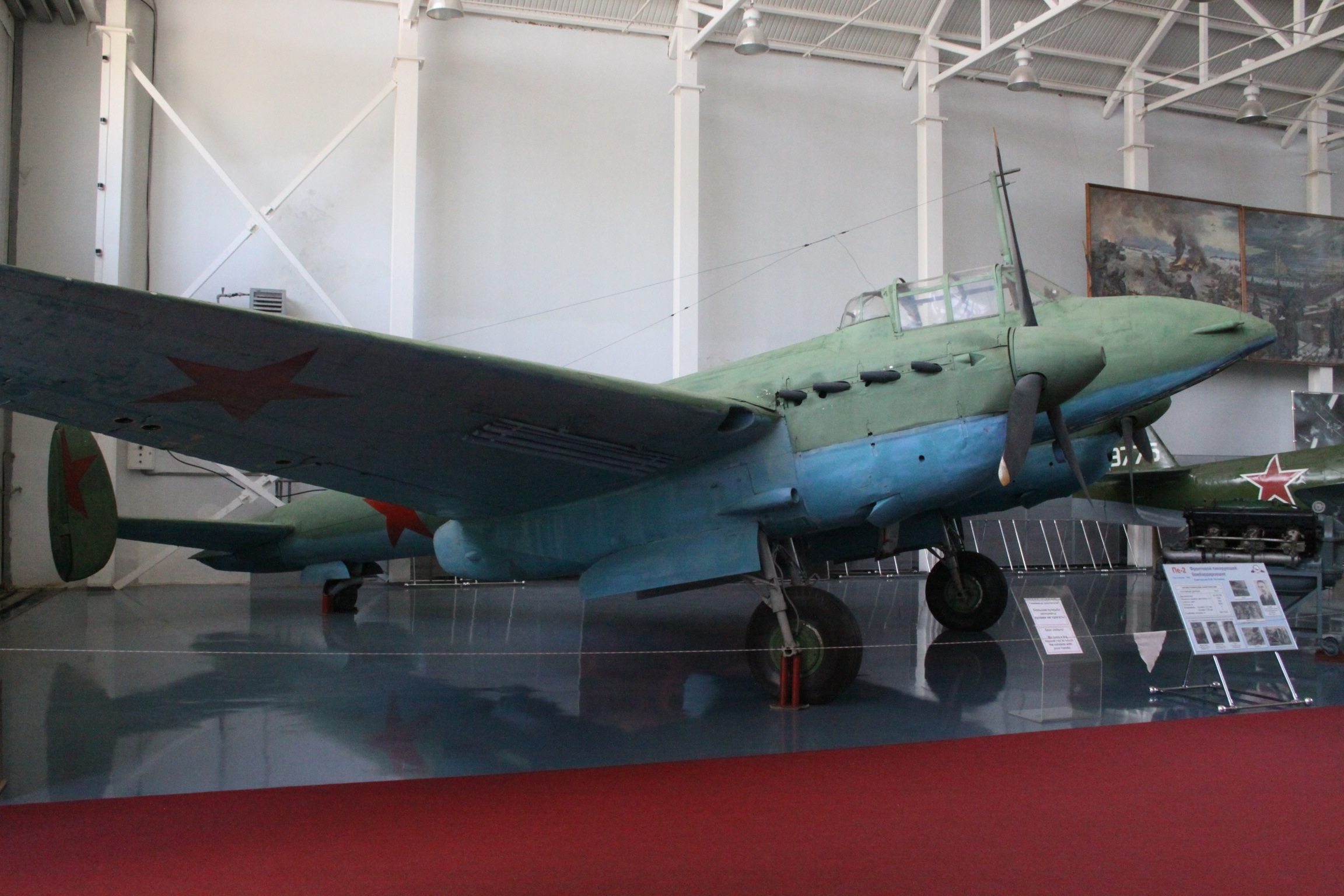
- Pe-2FT in the Central Air Force Museum, Monino, Russia

General information
- Type: Dive bomber
- National origin: Soviet Union
- Manufacturer: Plant No.22 (Kazan), Plant No.39 (Moscow), Plant No.124 (Kazan), Plant No.125 (Irkutsk)
- Designer: V.M. Petlyakov Design Bureau
- Primary users: Soviet Air Force Polish Air Force, Czechoslovak Air Force, Bulgarian Air Force
- Number built: 11,070 (+ 360 Pe-3)

History
- Manufactured: December 1940 - December 1945
- Introduction date: March 1941
- First flight: 22 December 1939 (VI-100)
- Retired: 1951 (Soviet Air Force), 1957 (Polish Air Force)
- Variant: Petlyakov Pe-3

The Petlyakov Pe-2 (Russian: Петляков Пе-2 — nickname «Пешка» (Pawn); NATO reporting name: Buck) was a Soviet twin-engine dive bomber used during World War II. One of the outstanding tactical attack aircraft of the war, it also proved successful as a heavy fighter, as a night fighter (Pe-3 variant) and as a reconnaissance aircraft. The Pe-2 was, numerically, the most important Soviet bomber of World War II, at their peak comprising 75% of the Soviet twin-engine bomber force. The Soviets manufactured Pe-2s in greater numbers (11,430 built) during the war than any other twin-engine combat aircraft except for the German Junkers Ju 88 and the British Vickers Wellington. Several Soviet bloc air forces flew the type after the war, when it became known by the NATO reporting name Buck.

== Development ==
In 1937, Vladimir Petlyakov was the leader of the Heavy Aircraft Brigade at the Tupolev OKB responsible for the development of the ANT-42 four-engined long-range bomber (which eventually entered service as the TB-7/Pe-8). However, that same year Stalin's Great Purge started, and none were spared suspicion; Andrei Tupolev, the head of the OKB, was coerced into signing a "confession" in October 1937 that he had formed an anti-Soviet group that included Petlyakov, and both men along with many others were arrested.

Too valuable to be simply executed, unlike many others arrested during the Great Purge, Petlyakov and other weapons designers were instead sent to sharashkas, special prisons run by the NKVD where such valuable prisoners could continue their work under close scrutiny. In 1938, Petlyakov was tasked with leading the first Special Technical Department (STO — SpetsTekhOd'yel) for aviation that also included other designers who became well-known such as Vladimir Myasishchev, a colleague of Petlyakov's at the Tupolev OKB.

=== VI-100 ===
Because the Russian word for "100" is "sto"("сто"), the STO was later renamed KB-100, and there Petlyakov proposed the development of a twin-engine interceptor against high-altitude long-range bombers, particularly those being developed in Germany such as the Junkers Ju 86P and Henschel Hs 130. His proposal was accepted in March 1938, with the requirement that the first prototype be ready for its first flight before the end of 1939. The project was initially given the name Samolyot 100 (lit. 'Aircraft 100') and later called VI-100 (Vysotnyi Istrebitel — "High-Altitude Fighter").

The VI-100 project was an ambitious one for its time, with advanced features such as a pressurised cabin, all-metal construction, turbo-superchargers, and many electrically actuated systems. The performance requirements were also quite demanding: it was to be capable of reaching 630 km/h (391 mph) at an altitude of 10,000 m, a ceiling of 12,500 m, and a range of 1,400 km. The aircraft would also need a reinforced structure in order to withstand the Mach stresses of making diving attacks from high altitude against enemy bomber formations. In order to assist with the challenging development of the "100", other OKBs such as those of Yakovlev, Mikoyan and Gurevich, and Sukhoi were also enlisted. The first full-scale VI-100 mock-up was completed in May 1939, and the first flight of the prototype occurred on 22 December 1939.

The VI-100 was an all-metal low-wing cantilever monoplane powered by two Klimov M-105R engines, licence-built Hispano-Suiza 12Y engines that were the most advanced then available in the Soviet Union, driving VISh-42 three-blade variable-pitch propellers, enhanced by two TK-3 turbo-superchargers fitted in the engine nacelles. Its primary armament were two 20 mm ShVAK cannon and two 7.62 mm ShKAS machine guns, with another ShKAS in a fixed mounting in the tailcone for self-defence. The first prototype VI-100 was also designed to carry KS-76 (48 modified 76 mm artillery shells with timed fuses) or KS-100 (96 AO-25 bomblets) cassettes in the fuselage for dropping on enemy bomber formations. The second prototype was instead fitted with external bomb racks for 1,000 kg of bombs and internal bomb bays for 600 kg of bombs.

The first VI-100 prototype was demonstrated publicly during the 1940 May Day parade, flown by Maj. Stefanovsky, as Petlyakov and his team watched on from the roofs of their sharashka. During testing in 1940, the second prototype VI-100 suffered a cockpit fire due to an improperly tightened nut in the fuel supply, and crashed into a kindergarten, killing a group of young children and a teacher. Despite the loss of the second prototype and several defects being found in the first prototype, the VI-100 was judged satisfactory and suitable for further development. Its performance was superior to other Soviet high-altitude fighters such as the Mikoyan-Gurevich I-200 (the future MiG-3), and compared favourably with contemporary aircraft such as the Potez 630, Messerschmitt Bf 110 C, and Bristol Beaufighter Mk. I. However, events led to substantial changes in the direction of the VI-100 project.

=== PB-100 ===
The value of tactical dive bombing had been proven by the Junkers Ju 87 Stuka dive bombers of the Luftwaffe during the Blitzkrieg campaigns of 1939 and 1940, and the need for such an aircraft in the VVS-RKKA (Workers & Peasants' Red Army Air Force) suddenly became very apparent. Furthermore, following the Molotov–Ribbentrop Non-Aggression Pact, Soviet experts were able to visit German aircraft factories, where they discovered that Germany had no large-scale development of high-altitude long-range bombers underway. Existing aircraft were also judged to be within the capabilities of single-engined fighters like the I-200.

Consequently it was decided in May 1940 that a dive-bomber using the good aerodynamics of the VI-100 would be designed and put into production. The new aircraft, now designated the PB-100 (Pikiruyushchiy Bombardirovshchik — "Dive-Bomber"), was required to achieve a maximum speed of 535 km/h at an altitude of 4800–4900 m, a range of 1,600 km at an altitude of 5,000 m, and a ceiling of 8000 m. Petlyakov and his team were instructed to redesign the two-seat high-altitude fighter into a three-seat dive-bomber within 45 days. In order to meet this deadline, Petlyakov's team were assisted by some 300 specialists from other OKBs.

The fuselage of the VI-100 had to be redesigned for the dive-bombing role. Initially, the PB-100 had three pressurised cabins for the three-man crew, but the VVS judged that pressurisation was an inessential luxury for the dive-bombing role, and was dropped. Furthermore, the high-altitude performance provided by the turbo-superchargers was also unnecessary, and these too were dropped. Extensive glazing was added to the lower portion of the nose to give the pilot maximum visibility during a dive-bombing attack. A bomb bay for a single 100 kg bomb was added in each engine nacelle, while the engines remained the same. The wing was modified, with dive brakes added. The cockpit was redesigned, bringing the navigator and pilot together, and given extensive glazing, while a defensive machine gun was added in the ventral position, operated by a gunner.

The redesign was completed in time, and the PB-100 was ordered into production without the construction of a prototype (only static tests were conducted for new components such as the fuselage), with the first two series production PB-100s completed by Zavod 39 in the late autumn of 1940. The trials of the lead machine (No. 390101) began on 15 December 1940. In accordance with the new rules also adopted in December 1940, the aircraft was also redesignated Pe-2 2M-105.

== Design features ==
The Pe-2 inherited the basic low-wing twin-engine monoplane configuration of the VI-100. It had an all-metal stressed-skin structure, with cloth only used to cover the ailerons and control surfaces. The tail had twin fins and rudders with a pronounced 8-degree dihedral on the tailplane; this had been added to the PB-100 to correct the poor lateral stability found on the VI-100 during testing.

The wing design of the Pe-2 was also inherited from the VI-100, but this had been optimised for high altitude performance at the cost of lower lift at low altitude, resulting in suboptimal manoeuvreability and take-off and landing characteristics. For example, while the Pe-2's flying characteristics were generally good once it was airborne, it took a good amount of force to pull the elevators up to rotate the plane for takeoff. Russian night bombing missions often flew with female pilots, and some of the women were not strong enough to get the airplane airborne by themselves. When such a situation occurred, the procedure was to have the navigator get behind the pilot's seat and wrap her arms around the control wheel and help the pilot pull the wheel back. Once the aircraft was airborne, the navigator returned to her duties and the pilot continued to fly the plane without assistance. In addition, the Pe-2 had a reputation for hard landings, as well as for its notorious "bounce" on landing due to the inadequate shock absorbers in the landing gear. This could be fatal if the pilot was not prepared for it. As designed, the wings were also fitted with "Venetian blind"-type slatted dive brakes for the dive-bombing role.

Pe-2s were equipped with an inert gas fire-suppression system for the self-sealing fuel tanks, which progressively filled the fuel tanks with nitrogen in order to reduce the risk of ignition when hit by enemy fire.

=== Armament ===
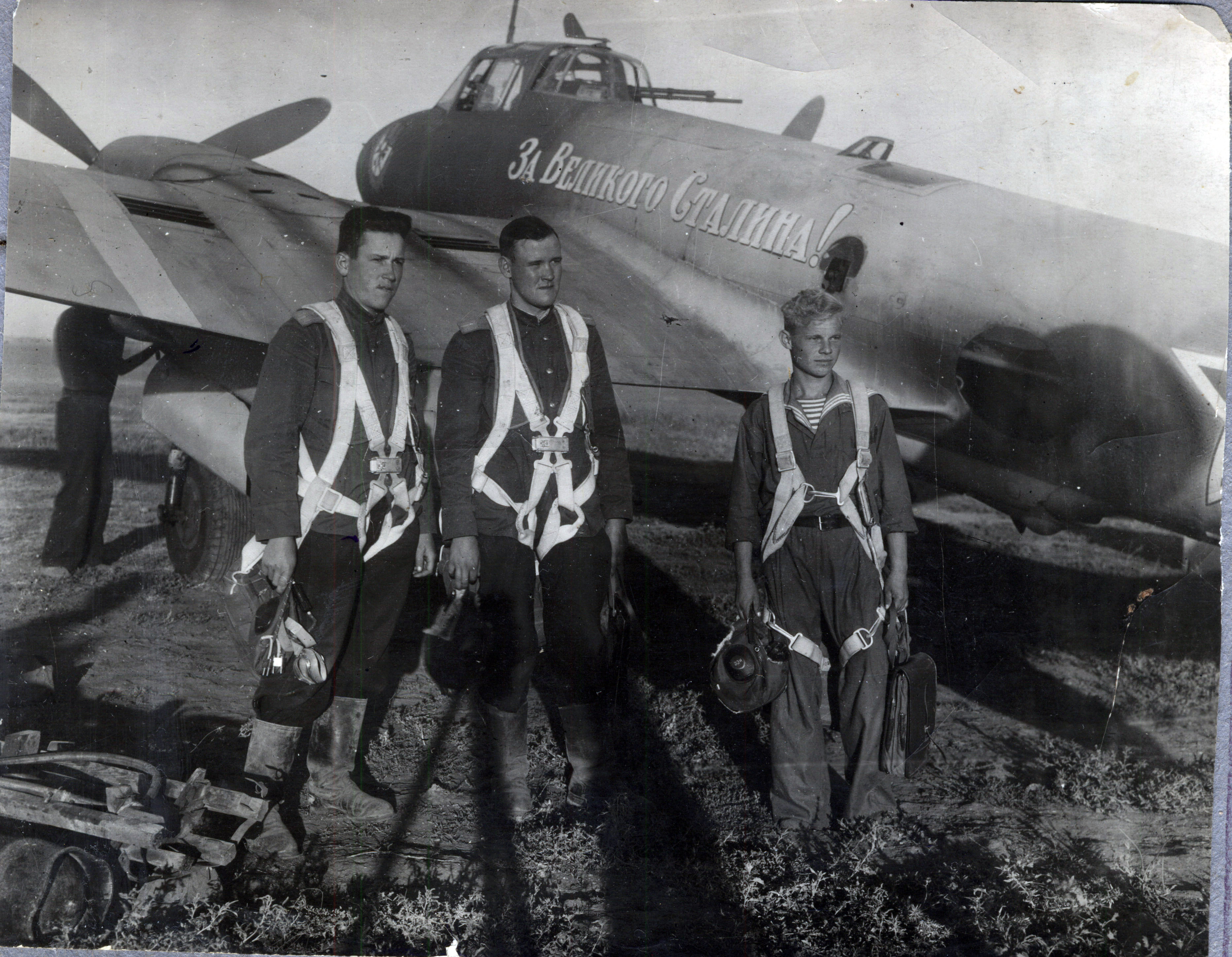
The crew of the Pe-2 dive bomber "For the Great Stalin" of the Bomber Aviation Regiment of the Black Sea Fleet after completing the mission

The Pe-2 had an internal capacity for six 100 kg bombs, for a total of 600 kg; this was no better than that of the older Tupolev SB bomber. The internal capacity consisted of a fuselage bomb bay capable of carrying four 100 kg bombs or an additional fuel tank, with two small internal bomb bays in the rear of the engine nacelles for a single 100 kg bomb each. This was supplemented by four external underwing racks. These were capable of carrying four 100 kg or 250 kg bombs, or two 500 kg bombs in overload configuration, giving a maximum bombload of 1,000 kg. Only the bombs in the external racks could be used in a dive-bombing attack; the internally carried bombs had no dive release gear and could not be dropped in a steep dive.

The offensive armament originally consisted of two 7.62 mm ShKAS fixed forward-firing machine guns in the nose. The right ShKAS was replaced by the more powerful 12.7 mm UBK heavy machine gun from Series 13 production aircraft onwards. From Series 32 onwards, provisions were made for underwing guide rails for up to ten RS-132 or RS-82 unguided rockets.

The defensive armament originally consisted of a single ShKAS machine gun in a dorsal TSS mounting, later MV-3 turret, manned by the navigator in the cockpit behind the pilot, and a ventral 7.62 mm ShKAS machine gun in a mounting in the fuselage behind the bomb bay aimed by a periscope. This defensive armament was found to be totally inadequate: from Series 13 onwards, the ventral ShKAS was replaced by one 12.7 mm UBT in an MV-2 mounting, while the dorsal ShKAS was also replaced by a UBT in various different mountings, some modified in the field and others from the factory:

- MV-7 turret: Turret mounting tested in September 1941. Unsatisfactory and not adopted.
- FT (Frontovoye Trebovaniye — "Frontline Demand") mounting: designed by Leonid Selyakov at Zavod 22 in response to the requests of Pe-2 crews to fit the standard Pe-2 with minimal changes to production and can be fitted in the field. Standardised from Series 83 onwards. This mounting required the canopy over the navigator to be removed, resulting in reduced comfort for the navigator manning the gun.
- VUB-1 turret: Turret mounting, standardised from Series 110 onwards. Pe-2s with this mounting are often known as "Pe-2FT" in Western literature, even though the VUB-1 turret has no connection to the actual FT mounting whatsoever.
- FZ (Frontovoye Zadaniye — "Frontline Mission") turret: Experimental turret mounting introduced in 1943. Uses magazines for the UBT instead of belts for easier and faster handling of the turret. Tests were successful, recommended for production, but not adopted in order to not disrupt Pe-2 production.

The replacement of the ShKAS defensive guns with the UBT was reported to increase the life expectancy of a Pe-2 from 20 sorties to 54.

== Operational service ==
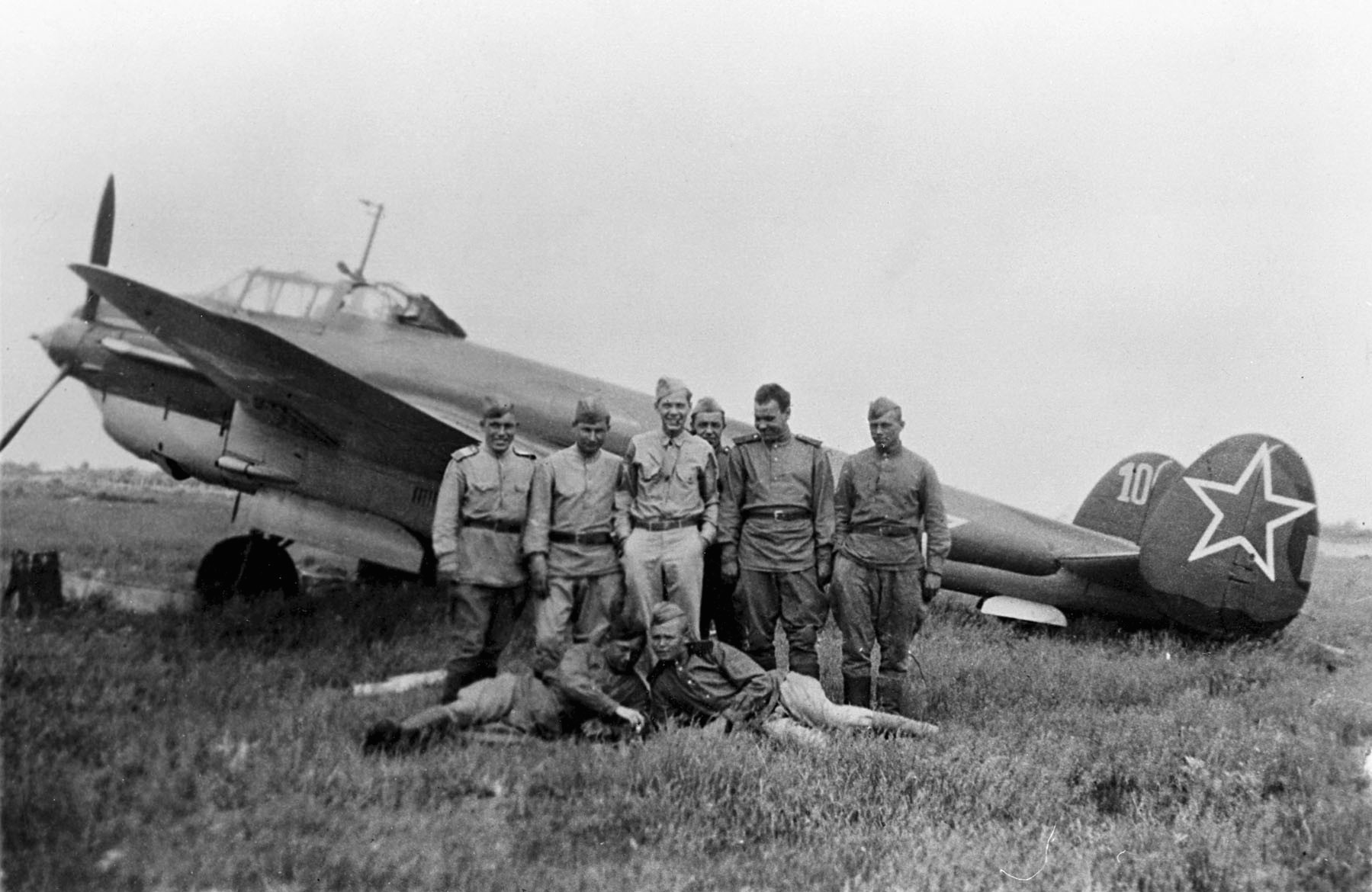
Soviet pilots and ground crew pose in front of a Pe-2 dive bomber at Poltava, June 1944.

The Pe-2 was first publicly demonstrated in the May Day Parade of 1941. Testing of the Pe-2 was completed and it was accepted for service in June 1941, shortly before the German invasion of the Soviet Union. During the early stages of the invasion, Pe-2 crews, who were poorly trained and unfamiliar with their new aircraft, were often sent on near-suicidal low-level bombing missions against advancing German forces, where they were highly vulnerable to light anti-aircraft guns and German fighters, or bombed from altitude with minimal accuracy and effectiveness against moving troops.

The aircraft did not show its true potential until the end of 1941, after the Soviet Air Force had a chance to regroup after the German onslaught, during the Winter. The Pe-2 quickly proved itself to be a highly capable aircraft, able to elude the Luftwaffe's interceptors and allowing their crews to develop great accuracy with their bombing. It could give German fighters fits when it could outrun them, at times reaching over 640 km/h (400 mph).

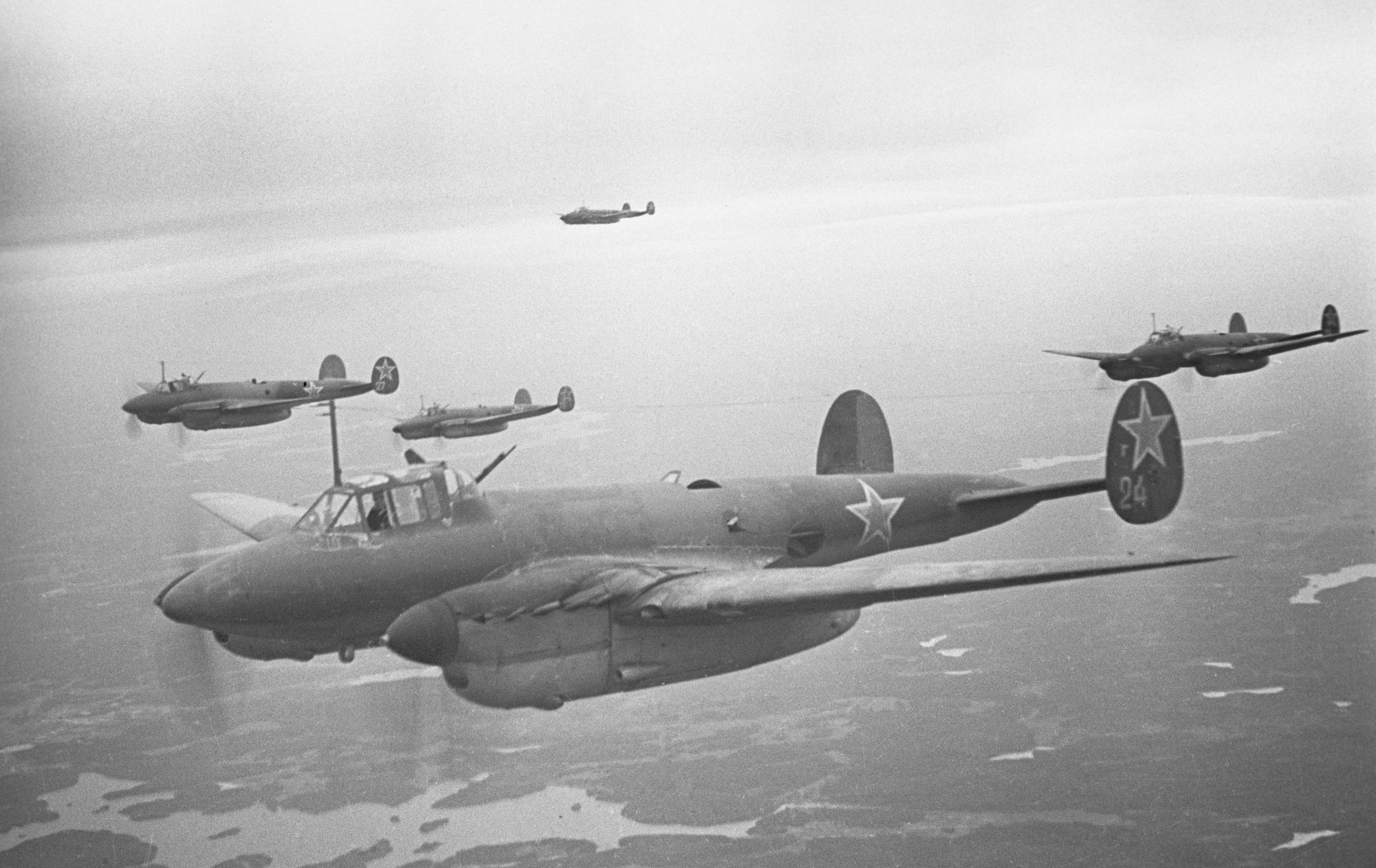
Pe-2s of the 34th Guards Bomber Aviation Regiment over the Karelian Isthmus during the Vyborg–Petrozavodsk offensive, June 1944

The records of the 16th and 39th BAPs of the Western Front Air Force note that the Pe-2's crews had the greatest success in repelling the attacks of enemy fighters in June and July 1941. On 1 July, for example, six Pe-2s fended off attacks by four Messerschmitt Bf 109s, shooting down two of them. A week later a group of Pe-2s was attacked by four Bf 109s and again brought down two of the attackers. On both occasions the Petlyakovs suffered no losses. On the southern front, a bombing mission against Ploiești, in Romania, by six Pe-2s, led by Capt. A. Tsurtsulin, was a great success: 250,450 kilograms (552,150 lb) of petroleum were burnt in the raid. The Romanian information agency claimed that at least 100 Soviet planes had bombed Ploiești.

The Pe-2 regiments' operations were not always successful and the service pilots complained about insufficient defensive armament and survivability: there was a great risk of fire and insufficient armour protection, especially for the navigators and gunners. German pilots soon discovered the limited sighting angles of the ventral gun mounting and its poor reliability. The ammunition belt of the UBT machine-gun often jammed after the first burst of fire when shooting in extreme positions. The navigator and the radio operator were poorly protected. On average, ten Pe-2 gunners were wounded for every pilot, and two or three were killed for the loss of one pilot.

Throughout 1942 the design was steadily refined and improved, in direct consultation with pilots who were actually flying them in combat. Improved armour protection and a fifth ShKAS machine-gun was installed and fuel tanks modified. Despite anecdotal reports by Soviet fliers, Pe-2s were daylight bombers, often crewed by comparative novices in the early years of the war, and took significant losses, even when well protected by fighters. In December 1942 General Ivan Turkel of the Soviet Air Force estimated the life expectancy of a Pe-2 was 30 combat flights. An example of loss rates after the Soviets gained the upper hand can be gained by the losses suffered by the 1st and 2nd BAK. The former started the month of July 1943 with 179 machines, and lost 52 that month, and 59 the next, ending August with 156 bombers after receiving replacements. The 2nd BAK started July with 122 Pe-2s, with monthly losses of 30 and 20, ending August 1943 with 114 Pe-2s after replacements arrived. Most of these losses were at the hands of the thinly stretched German fighter groups, which continued to inflict significant losses when present in strength, even in the closing months of the war. For example, in the Baltic where JG54 Grünherz were the main opposition, and greatly outnumbered, the Soviet 1st Gv BAK lost 86 Pe-2s shot down (another 12 to other causes), mostly to German fighters between 23 July 1944 and 8 February 1945. Western sources use mark Pe-2FT for production series after 83, where FT stands for Frontovoe Trebovanie (Frontline Request), although Soviet documents do not use this identification. Final versions Pe-2K (transitional version of Pe-2I) and Pe-2I were produced in small numbers, due to the unwillingness of Soviet industry to decelerate production numbers.

Starting on 14 April 1945, some Pe-2FT aircraft were operated by the 1st Czechoslovak Mixed Air Division made up of exiled Czechoslovak pilots in the Soviet Union. After the war, the reinstated Czechoslovak Air Force operated 32 Pe-2FT and 3 UPe-2 between May 1946 and mid 1951. The first aircraft arrived at Prague-Kbely airfield in April 1946 and formed two squadrons of the 25 Air Regiment in Havlíčkův Brod. Czechoslovak aircraft were known under the designation B-32 (Pe-2FT) and CB-32 (UPe-2).

=== Finnish Air Force ===
In 1941, after the outbreak of the Continuation War, Finland purchased six captured Pe-2 aircraft from Germany. These arrived at State Aircraft Factory facilities at Härmälä, near Tampere, in January 1942, where the airframes were overhauled and given Finnish serial numbers. The seventh Pe-2 was bought from the Germans in January 1944, and it was flown to Finland at the end of the month.

It was initially planned to use these planes as dive bombers in the 1st flight of LeLv 48, which began to receive its aircraft in July 1942, but during the training it was found out that this caused too much strain for the engines. Thus, the role of Pe-2s was changed to fly long-range photographic and visual reconnaissance missions for the Army General Headquarters. These sorties began in late 1942, and were often flown with two 250 kg (551 lb) bombs for harassment bombing and in order to cover the true purpose of missions.

By the time the Soviet Fourth strategic offensive started in June 1944, the secondary bombing role had already ended and the surviving Pe-2s began to be used solely over the Karelian Isthmus on photographic reconnaissance flights in order to find out enemy troop concentrations, usually escorted by four Finnish Air Force Bf 109 Gs. These vital missions allowed artillery and bombers of the Finnish Air Force and the Luftwaffe's Detachment Kuhlmey to strike against formations preparing for attack, which had an important impact on the outcome of the Battle of Tali-Ihantala, where the Soviet advance was halted.

During the Continuation War, three Pe-2s were lost in accidents or technical failures, one was destroyed in bombing of Lappeenranta airfield, one was shot down by Soviet fighters and one went missing in action. In the Lapland War the only remaining machine flew a single reconnaissance sortie in October 1944. On average, the aircraft flew some 94 hours per plane during the war.

The Finnish Air Force also operated one Petlyakov Pe-3 (PE-301) that had been captured in 1943.

PE-301 and PE-215 were destroyed when Soviet aircraft bombed the Lappeenranta airfield on 2 July 1944. PE-212 went down in 1943, PE-213 was destroyed in an emergency landing in 1942. PE-214 was destroyed in a failed take-off attempt at Härmälä on 21 May 1942. As Härmälä airfield was quite short, the pilot had to tried to lift off with too little speed, which caused the aircraft to stall and crash, killing the crew. PE-217 managed to shoot down a Soviet fighter in 1944. PE-216 was destroyed in a forced landing in 1944. PE-211 survived the war and was removed from FAF lists in 1946. It was still standing beside the Kauhava airfield in 1952, but further information on its fate is unknown.

== Variants ==
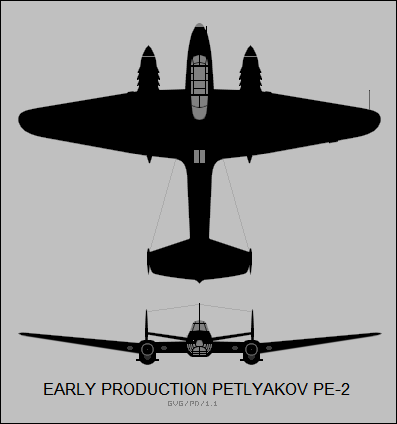
Top view of an early production prototype Pe-2.

In total, around 11,400 Pe-2s were built; a large number of minor variants were also developed.

PB-100
Prototype of the Pe-2 modified from the VI-100 in 1940.
Pe-2
First production variant.

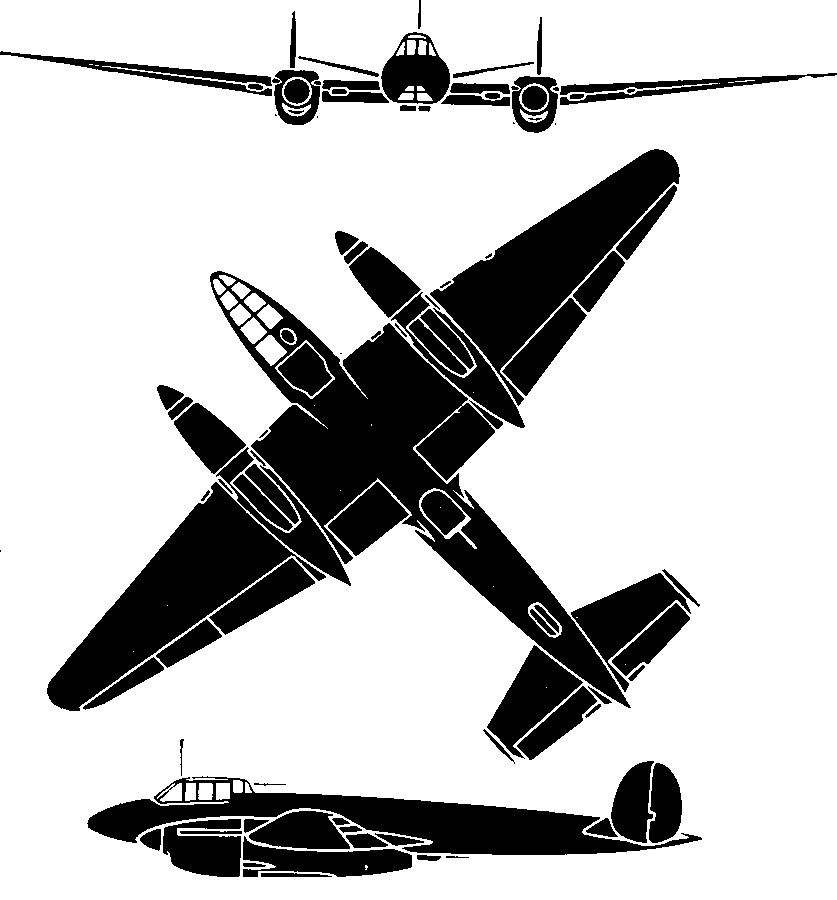
Bottom view of a Production Prototype Pe-2.

Pe-2B

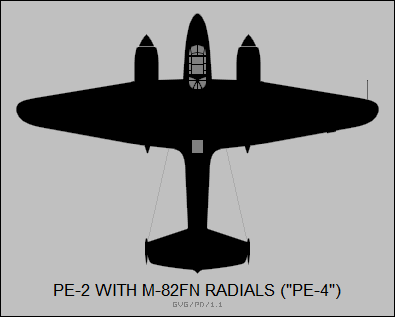
Top View of a Pe-2 with the M-82FN engines.

Standard bomber version from 1944.
Pe-2D
Three-seat bomber version, powered by two VK-107A piston engines.
Pe-2FT
Main production variant. In Czechoslovakia known as the B-32. Improved defensive armament (7.62 mm machine gun in dorsal turret), removal of the dive brakes, and an uprated engine. Nose glazing was also reduced.
Pe-2FZ
Built in small numbers.
Pe-2I
Improved version designed by Vladimir Myasishchev. VK-107 engines; revised wing profile; remote-controlled tail gun. Top speed 656 km/h (408 mph). Could carry 1,000 kg (2,204 lb) bombs. Five examples built.
Pe-2K
Radial-engined version, small number built.
Pe-2K RD-1
One Pe-2K equipped with additional RD-1 rocket engine. The 300 kg (661 lb) Glushko RD-1 rocket engine was installed in the tail of the aircraft.
Pe-2M
Variant of Pe-2I with heavier armament.
Pe-2MV
This version was armed with 20 mm ShVAK cannons and two 12.7 mm (0.5 in) in an underfuselage gondola, it also had one 7.62 mm (0.3 in) machine gun in the dorsal turret.
Pe-2R
Three-seat photo reconnaissance version, with a larger fuel tanks and extended range. small number built.
Pe-2S
Two-seat training version.
Pe-2Sh
The PB-100 prototype was fitted with two 20 mm ShVAK cannons, and a single 12.7 mm (0.5 in) machine gun was fitted beneath the fuselage.
Pe-2VI
High altitude fighter version.
Pe-2UTI (UPe-2)
Dedicated trainer version, small number built. In Czechoslovakia known as the CB-32.
Pe-2 Paravan
Anti-barrage balloon version.
Pe-3
Long-range night fighter version.
Pe-2 M-82FN
Pe-2 with Shvetsov M-82FN engines. Also known unofficially as the Pe-4.

== Operators ==
Bulgaria

- Bulgarian Air Force

People's Republic of China

- People's Liberation Army Air Force

Czechoslovakia

- Czechoslovak Air Force

Finland

- Finnish Air Force operated seven captured aircraft (given the Finnish serial numbers PE-211 to PE-217).

Hungary

- Hungarian Air Force

Poland

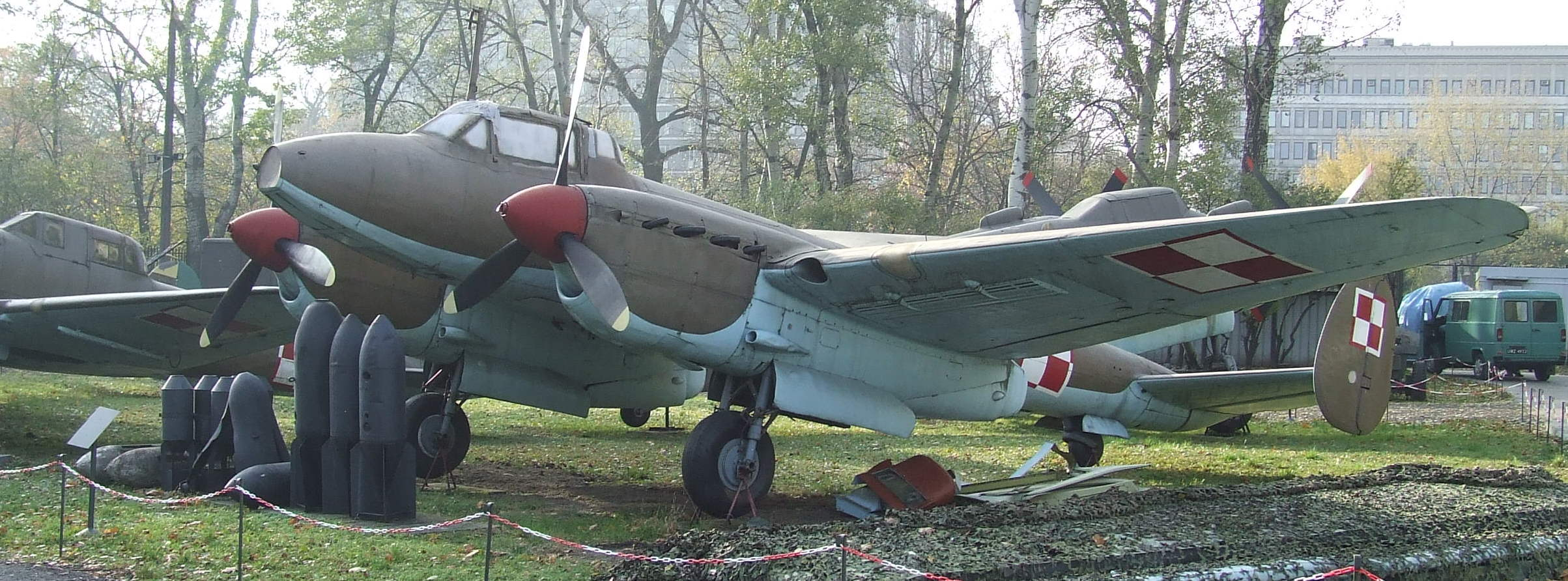
Pe-2

- Air Force of the Polish Army (after 1947 Polish Air Force)
- Polish Navy

Soviet Union

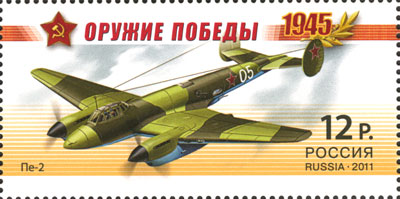
Pe-2, featured on 2011 postage stamp of Russia, Weapons of Victory stamp series

- Soviet Air Force

Yugoslavia

- SFR Yugoslav Air Force operated 123 Pe-2FT and 9 UPe-2 between 1945 and 1954.
  - 41st Bomber Aviation Regiment (1945–1948)
  - 42nd Bomber Aviation Regiment (1945–1948)
  - 43rd Bomber Aviation Regiment (1947–1948)
  - Night Bomber Aviation Regiment (1948)
  - 88th Bomber Aviation Regiment (1948–1952)
  - 97th Bomber Aviation Regiment (1948–1952)
  - 109th Bomber Aviation Regiment (1948–1952)
  - 185th Mixed Aviation Regiment (1949–1952)
  - 715th Independent Reconnaissance Squadron (1949–1952)

== Aircraft on display ==
Norway

- 16/141 – Pe-2FT on display at the Norwegian Aviation Museum in Bodø, Nordland. Only the cockpit section is on display, with the remainder of the aircraft awaiting restoration.

Poland

- Pe-2FT on display at the Museum of the Polish Army in Warsaw, Mazovia.

Russia

- Composite – On display at the Central Air Force Museum in Monino.
- On display at the UMMC Museum Complex in Verkhnyaya Pyshma, Sverdlovsk.

Czechia

- Cockpit on display at the Kbely Museum

== Specifications (Petlyakov Pe-2 - early production) ==
Petljakov Pe-2 3-view drawings. A rare variant with radial engines is depicted.

Data from From Sotka to Peshka

General characteristics

- Crew: 3
- Length: 12.66 m (41 ft 6 in)
- Wingspan: 17.16 m (56 ft 4 in)
- Height: 3.42 m (11 ft 3 in)
- Wing area: 40.50 m^{2} (435.9 sq ft)
- Airfoil: NACA 23012
- Empty weight: 5,950 kg (13,118 lb)
- Gross weight: 7,536 kg (16,614 lb)
- Max takeoff weight: 8,520 kg (18,783 lb)
- Powerplant: 2 × Klimov M-105RA V-12 liquid-cooled piston engines, 820 kW (1,100 hp) each
- Propellers: 3-bladed VISH-62 metal constant-speed propellers, 3.25 m (10 ft 8 in) diameter

Performance

- Maximum speed: 540 km/h (340 mph, 290 kn) at 5,000 m (16,400 ft)
- Cruise speed: 428 km/h (266 mph, 231 kn) (max continuous cruise)
- Range: 1,315 km (817 mi, 710 nmi) (with 1,000 kg (2,200 lb) bombs
- Service ceiling: 8,800 m (28,900 ft)
- Time to altitude: 3.76 min to 3,000 m (9,800 ft)

Armament

- Guns: *2 × 7.62 mm (0.3 in) fixed ShKAS machine guns in the nose
- 2 × rearward firing 7.62 mm (0.3 in) ShKAS machine guns (1 in dorsal mount, one in ventral mount)
  - Some aircraft were also equipped with a DAG-10 launcher, firing AG-2 parachute timed grenades.
- Bombs: 1,000 kg (2,200 lb) of bombs

== See also ==
Related development

- Pe-3
- Myasishchev DB-108

Aircraft of comparable role, configuration, and era

- de Havilland Mosquito
- Junkers Ju 88
- Messerschmitt Bf 110
- Fokker G.I
- Lockheed P-38 Lightning
- Tupolev Tu-2

Related lists

- List of aircraft of World War II
- List of bomber aircraft
- List of military aircraft of the Soviet Union and the CIS
