= Petlyakov Pe-3 =

Soviet long-range heavy fighter

- The first prototype of the Pe-3bis

General information
- Type: Heavy fighter, Night fighter
- Manufacturer: Petlyakov
- Designer: Vladimir Petlyakov
- Primary users: VVS; Naval Aviation Finnish Air Force
- Number built: 360

History
- Manufactured: 1941–1944
- Introduction date: 1941
- First flight: 7 August 1941
- Retired: 1945
- Developed from: Petlyakov Pe-2

The Petlyakov Pe-3 was the long-range heavy fighter version of the successful Petlyakov Pe-2 high-speed dive bomber used by the Soviet Union during World War II.

Its design and use followed a comparable path to those taken by the German Luftwaffe with the Junkers Ju 88 and the British Royal Air Force with the De Havilland Mosquito. The Soviets realized the need for a night fighter after the first night bombing of Moscow during Operation Barbarossa. The Petlyakov Pe-2 was selected for modification as the most suitable aircraft available.

It was initially used for daylight ground attack missions during the Battle of Moscow, but this proved to be costly since the aircraft was unarmored. Armor and additional guns were retrofitted to the existing aircraft to make it more effective, but the evacuation of the sole factory building the Pe-3 in October 1941 limited the number of aircraft available and many units of the Soviet Air Forces flying the Pe-3 were either disbanded or converted to other aircraft. Although production was stopped and restarted several times, the aircraft remained in service throughout World War II. Most of the later production runs were given to reconnaissance units.

== Development ==
A crash-development program began after the July 1941 German night bombing of Moscow to field a night fighter with heavy armament and long endurance. Only an aircraft currently in production could be used to satisfy the extremely tight deadline and the Pe-2 was selected for modification by the State Commissariat for Defence (Russian: Narodnyy Komissariaht Oborony—NKO) as the fastest twin-engined aircraft in service. The order only authorized four days to modify the aircraft's fuel, armament and radio systems, but this deadline was met when the modified aircraft made its first flight on 7 August and it passed its manufacturer's trials the following day.

Three additional fuel tanks, with a capacity of 700 liters (154 imp gal; 185 U.S. gal) were fitted in the prototype, one in the fuselage bomb bay and the other two replaced the ventral gunner's position. The nose armament was reinforced with an additional 12.7-millimeter (0.50 in) Berezin UBK machine gun with 150 rounds and a fixed 7.62-millimeter (0.300 in) ShKAS machine gun with 250 rounds was added in the tail cone. Removal of two of the fuselage bomb racks reduced the maximum bomb load to 700 kilograms (1,543 lb), one 250-kilogram (551 lb) bomb on each of the fuselage racks and one 100-kilogram (220 lb) in each of the engine nacelles. The electric bomb release system was removed and the bombs had to be dropped using the mechanical system, initially designed as the emergency system. The dive brakes under the wings were also removed. The BSBbis radio was exchanged for the RSI-4 model commonly used in single-seat fighters and the radio direction finder was also removed to save weight. The prototype weighed 5,890 kg (12,985 lb) empty and it had a normal take-off weight of 7,800 kg (17,196 lb), slightly heavier than the version of the Pe-2 then in production. During testing it demonstrated a maximum speed of 530 km/h (329 mph) at 5,000 meters (16,404 ft), a service ceiling of 9,000 meters (29,528 ft) and a maximum range of 2,150 km (1,336 mi). This was considered adequate and Factory (Russian: Zavod) Nr. 39 in Moscow was ordered on 14 August to build five pre-production aircraft for delivery by 25 August. This process proved difficult because drawings had not been made for many of the new parts and they had to be fitted by hand, slowing the production rate.

Slightly more extensive testing of a pre-production aircraft was done by the Air Force Scientific Test Institute (Russian: Nauchno-Issledovatel'skiy Institoot Voyenno-Vozdushnykh Seel—NII VVS) between 29 August and 7 September. Although they confirmed the initial performance figures, the tests revealed other problems. The lower nose Plexiglas windows cracked when the lower UBK machine gun was fired, a problem initially cured by replacing some of the glazing with a duralumin skin, but this too proved to be too weak, and it was itself later replaced by a steel panel. Pre-production testing also revealed that the casings and links from the large-caliber weapons damaged the skin of the wings and sometimes entered the radiator intakes, where they could cause extensive damage. Revising the shape of the ejector chutes did not help and the casings had to be collected in the nose. Pre-production testing also identified several other specific weaknesses that had to be corrected on the production line. The Pe-3's offensive firepower was too weak and a 20-millimeter (0.79 in) ShVAK cannon was added. The firepower of the dorsal 7.62mm ShKAS machine gun was considered inadequate, and on the production line, was replaced by a 12.7 mm Berezin UBT machine gun. To protect the crew, the production line added frontal armor and extended existing armor to the rear to protect the navigator. The production line also replaced the RSI-4 radio with model that had greater range and added a camera for the Pe-3's reconnaissance role. Although most of the initial aircraft were delivered without these adaptations, they were modified in the field by factory teams.

The first Pe-3s were issued to the 95th High-Speed Bomber Regiment in the Moscow Military District and the Regiment's experiences with the aircraft revealed other problems. Firing the guns at night dazzled the pilot and destroyed his night vision and the glare from searchlights through the glazing on the lower nose also blinded the pilot. Crews complained bitterly that the lack of frontal armor made them vulnerable to defensive fire from German bombers. Flash hiders installed on the guns and curtains covering the windows cured the first problems, but the lack of armor could not be rectified immediately. Many aircraft were also fitted with launchers for four to six RS-82 and RS-132 rockets for ground-attack missions. Another common addition was a launcher for DAG-10 aerial grenades mounted in the tail.

The Petlyakov design bureau addressed these concerns in September and they were tested in the Pe-3bis (Note: bis was a suffix used by the Soviets to mark a major upgrade of an aircraft or weapon) prototype between September and October. The armament was upgraded with 250 rounds provided for each of the UBK machine guns, a 20 mm ShVAK cannon with 250 rounds was mounted in the nose and a 12.7 mm Berezin UBT machine gun with 180 rounds in boxes replaced the 7.62 mm ShKAS in the dorsal position. Frontal armor was installed and the navigator's seat armor was thickened with a total weight of 136 kg (300 lb). Automatic leading edge slats were fitted and the nitrogen fuel tank pressurization system was replaced by one that used inert gases from the engine exhaust. The crash pylon was moved forward 48 centimeters (1 ft 7 in) and the cockpit canopy shortened.

Many of these changes were made to aircraft before Pe-3bis production resumed in April 1942 and combat-use revealed several additional problems that had to be addressed in a second Pe-3bis prototype, which began its State acceptance tests in May 1942. Reloading the nose guns proved to be time-consuming, taking up to 45 minutes, and the night-firing of the port-side UBK continued to blind the pilot. These problems prompted the transfer of both UBK guns to the wing center section where they were installed in a compartment that was hinged at the front to drop down and allow easier access to the guns and their ammunition. The starboard gun was given 230 rounds and the port gun had 265 rounds. This change reduced the capacity of the Nr. 7 fuel tank by 100 liters (22 imp gal; 26 U.S. gal), but an asbestos bulkhead was added to protect the tank from heat generated by the guns. The changes meant that the cartridge cases from the ShVAK cannon could not be collected, making the skin and lower fuselage vulnerable. These were reinforced with steel sheets to minimize the damage inflicted by the large-caliber cases. The original mounting for the dorsal UBT machine gun provided an excellent field of fire, but lack of aerodynamic balance prevented the gunner/navigator to use its full range. Pressure exerted by the airstream prevented the gunner from traversing more than about 40–50° from the centerline. A twin-petal compensator proved mostly ineffective. The crash pylon was removed to give the gunner more working space. The ammunition box of the UBT was too small, only 30 rounds, and took about a minute to reload. The boxes were deleted and the UBT was given a 200-round belt with an electric drive to help to prevent feed problems. An anti-icing system was added for the propellers and the pilot's windscreen. The nose glazing was replaced entirely and the crew's armor was increased to a total weight of 148 kg (326 lb). These changes moved the aircraft's center of gravity forward and the landing gear struts were lengthened, moving the wheels 60 mm (2.4 in) forward, which helped to reduce the chance of the aircraft tipping over.

=== Production ===
Zavod Nr. 39 built 16 Pe-3s in August, including the prototype, 98 in September and 82 in October before the factory was evacuated to Irkutsk late in October. Production was restarted in April 1942 with a total of 132 built during the year. All were Pe-3bis models except for eleven Pe-3s that had not been completed before the evacuation. Thirteen were built in 1943 before production was canceled in favor of Ilyushin Il-4 bombers. A final production batch of 19 was built at Zavod Nr. 22 in early 1944, but these were more lightly armed than earlier versions, with only a single ShVAK cannon in the wing center section and one UBK in the nose. The bomb racks in the engine nacelles were eliminated entirely, as was the fixed ShKAS machine gun in the tail. Two DAG-10 grenade launchers were fitted in the rear fuselage, each with ten grenades.

== Operational history ==
The first Pe-3s were issued to the 95th High-Speed Bomber Aviation Regiment in August 1941 and it was initially committed to the ground attack and escort roles after retraining through September. It was redesignated as the 95th Fighter Aviation Regiment on 25 September and assigned to the 6th Fighter Aviation Corps of the PVO defending Moscow. A few days later six Pe-3s escorted C-47s carrying a British military delegation flying from Vologda to Moscow and successfully defended against several German attacks on the transports. Pe-3s strafed German troop columns as they approached Moscow during Operation Typhoon. On 24 October the 95th and 208th Fighter Aviation Regiments, with a total of twenty-seven Pe-3s between them, attacked the German airfield at Kalinin, claiming thirty German aircraft destroyed for the loss of five Soviet aircraft and pilots, including the commander of the 208th Regiment, Major S. Kibirinym. The 9th, 40th, 54th and 511th Bomber Aviation Regiments also received Pe-3s during September and performed similar missions. Approximately 50 aircraft were lost during the Pe-3's first three months of combat, about 25% of the aircraft produced thus far. This was a very high loss rate and a number of units began to conduct less risky reconnaissance missions to minimize casualties. Pe-3s were issued to the 1st, 2nd and 3rd Reconnaissance Aviation Regiments in October as well.

With production terminated in October due to the evacuation of the factory, the number of available Pe-3s could not sustain as many units and many began to convert to other aircraft or roles. The 40th Fast Bomber Aviation Regiment was re-designated as the 40th Separate Long-range Reconnaissance Aviation Regiment on 15 December and mustered five Pe-3s on 1 May 1942 and eleven Pe-3s on 1 January 1943. The 9th Bomber Aviation Regiment was directly assigned to the Chief of Staff of the Air Force at the end of November 1941 and received the additional task of leading groups of fighters and attack aircraft to their targets because their pilots could not navigate on their own. Over 2000 aircraft were led to their targets in this manner before the regiment was converted to other roles. The 54th Bomber Aviation Regiment appears to have been disbanded on or after 20 May 1942. The 208th Short-Range Bomber Regiment lost ten aircraft before it transferred its surviving pilots and aircraft to the 95th Fighter Aviation Regiment in mid-January 1942 and reformed on the Ilyushin Il-2. On 5 February 1942 the 511th Bomber Aviation Regiment was based at Tula and lost three of its eight Pe-3s on strength to a German air raid. It was disbanded in late March 1942 for lack of aircraft. The 95th Fighter Aviation Regiment was transferred on 1 March 1942 to the Air Force of the Northern Fleet where it performed convoy escort, ground attack and reconnaissance missions in support of the Fleet. It operated Pe-3s as late as the end of 1942 when some of its crews, which had just picked up new aircraft, were diverted to participate in the Battle of Stalingrad, although most of the 1942 production aircraft were given to the 2nd, 4th, and 40th Separate Long-Range Reconnaissance Regiments.

A single Pe-3 was captured by the Finns when it had to make a forced landing in marshy ground near Lake Inari on 28 November 1942. It was relatively undamaged and was recovered, repaired and placed into service as 'PE-301'. It served with PLeLv 48 and was converted into a photo-reconnaissance aircraft in 1944 before being destroyed by a Soviet bombing raid on the airfield at Lappeenranta on 2 July 1944. By then, it had flown over 222 hours in Finnish service.

The Gneiss-2 airborne radar was evaluated in the Pe-3 beginning in July 1942 and it was sent to both Moscow and Stalingrad for combat trials in late 1942. Another round of trials was conducted by aircraft of the 2nd Guards Fighter Corps of the PVO in Leningrad between February and May 1943 and it was approved for service the next month. Very few appear to have been deployed as only fifteen were fitted on Pe-3s.

== Variants ==
Pe-3
Initial production model, 207 built.
Pe-3bis
Upgraded version put into production in 1942; 152 of these aircraft were built.
Pe-3M
Designation sometimes associated with the 1944 production aircraft.

== Operators ==
Finland

- Finnish Air Force operated one captured aircraft.

Soviet Union

- VVS
- PVO
- Naval Aviation
- Regimental listing:
  - 95th Fighter Aviation Regiment
  - 208th Fighter Aviation Regiment
  - 9th Bomber Aviation Regiment
  - 40th Fast Bomber Aviation Regiment, later the 40th Separate Long-Range Reconnaissance Regiment
  - 54th Bomber Aviation Regiment
  - 95th High-Speed Bomber Aviation Regiment, later the 95th Fighter Aviation Regiment
  - 208th Short-Range Bomber Regiment, later the 208th Fighter Aviation Regiment
  - 511th Bomber Aviation Regiment
  - 1st Separate Reconnaissance Regiment
  - 2nd Separate Long-Range Reconnaissance Regiment
  - 3rd Separate Reconnaissance Regiment
  - 4th Separate Long-Range Reconnaissance Regiment
  - 40th Separate Long-Range Reconnaissance Regiment
    - Note that regiments often changed branches

== Specifications (Petlyakov Pe-3bis) ==
Data from Gordon, Soviet Airpower in World War 2

General characteristics

- Crew: 2
- Length: 12.66 m (41 ft 6 in)
- Wingspan: 17.13 m (56 ft 2 in)
- Wing area: 40.5 m^{2} (436 sq ft)
- Empty weight: 5,858 kg (12,915 lb)
- Gross weight: 8,000 kg (17,637 lb)
- Powerplant: 2 × Klimov M-105RA liquid-cooled V12 engines, 820 kW (1,100 hp) each
- Propellers: 3-bladed

Performance

- Maximum speed: 530 km/h (330 mph, 290 kn) at 5,050 meters (16,570 ft)
- Range: 1,500 km (930 mi, 810 nmi)
- Service ceiling: 9,100 m (29,900 ft)
- Time to altitude: 6.65 minutes to 5,000 meters (16,000 ft)

Armament

- Guns:
  - 1 × 20 mm ShVAK cannon in the nose with 250 rounds
  - 2 × 12.7 mm UBK machine guns in the fuselage with 500 rounds
  - 1 × 12.7 mm UBT machine gun in dorsal turret with 300 rounds
  - 1 × 7.62 mm ShKAS machine gun in the tail cone with 250 rounds (later removed)
- Bombs: up to 700 kg (1,543 lb)

== See also ==
Aircraft of comparable role, configuration, and era

- de Havilland Mosquito
- Junkers Ju 88
- Tupolev Tu-2

Related lists

- List of military aircraft of the Soviet Union and the CIS
