= Sharashka =

Soviet-era prison-workplace for engineers and scientists

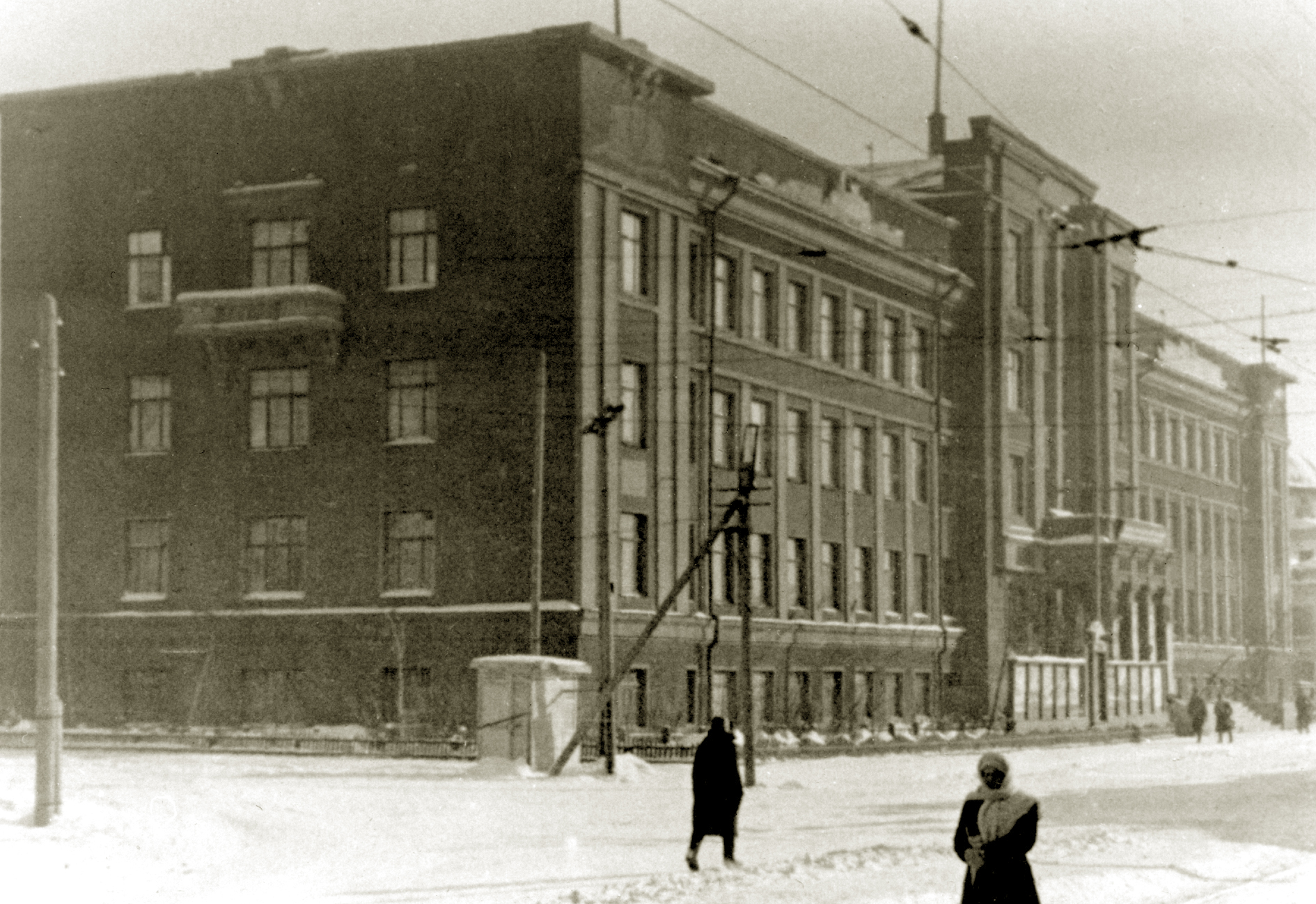
Tupolev's sharashka TsKB-29 of NKVD in Omsk (1943)

In the Soviet Union, a sharashka (Russian: шара́шка, [ʂɐˈraʂkə]; sometimes sharaga, sharazhka) was a type of secret research and development laboratory operating from the 1920s to the 1950s within the Gulag labor camp system, as well as in other facilities under the supervision of the Soviet secret service. Formally various secret R&D facilities were called "special design bureaus" (особое конструкторское бюро, ОКБ) and similar terms. Etymologically, the word sharashka derives from a Russian slang expression sharashkina kontora (lit. 'Sharashka's office'), an ironic, derogatory term to denote a poorly-organized, impromptu, or bluffing organization, which in its turn comes from the criminal argot term sharaga (шарага) for a band of thieves, hoodlums, etc.

The scientists and engineers at a sharashka were prisoners picked by the Soviet government from various camps and prisons and assigned to work on scientific and technological problems. Living conditions were usually much better than in an average taiga camp, mostly because of the absence of hard labor.

Some of the scientists and engineers imprisoned in sharashkas were released during and after World War II (1939–1945) to continue independent careers; some became world-renowned.

== History ==
On May 15, 1930, the Supreme Soviet of the National Economy and OGPU issued a secret circulaire "Об использовании на производстве специалистов, осужденных за вредительство" ("On the use in production of specialists convicted of wrecking"). It ordered the use of "engineers-wreckers" to "eliminate the consequences of wrecking" and to provide them with the necessary literature, materials and devices for this. It also said that "the use of the wreckers must be organized in such a way that their work was carried out on the premises of the organs of OGPU."

In 1930 Leonid Ramzin and other engineers sentenced in the Industrial Party Trial were formed into a special design bureau under the Joint State Political Directorate (OGPU), which was then the Soviet secret police.

In July 1931, the OGPU seized control of the Intercession Convent in Suzdal and the following year created a special prison laboratory (known as the Bureau of Special Purpose or BON) where around nineteen leading plague and tularaemia specialists were forced to work on the development of biological weapons. Colonel Mikhail Mikhailovich Faibich, a specialist in typhus, was the first director of BON. The laboratory was in operation until 1936, when the scientists were transferred to a Red Army microbiology facility on Gorodomlya Island on Lake Seliger.

In 1938, Lavrenty Beria, a senior NKVD official, created the Department of Special Design Bureaus at the NKVD USSR (Отдел особых конструкторских бюро НКВД СССР). In 1939, the unit was renamed the Special Technical Bureau at the NKVD USSR (Особое техническое бюро НКВД СССР) and placed under the control of General Valentin Kravchenko, under Beria's immediate supervision. In 1941 it received a secret name, the 4th Special Department of the NKVD USSR (4-й спецотдел НКВД СССР).

In 1949, the scope of the sharashkas significantly increased. Previously the work done there was of military and defense character. The MVD Order No. 001020 dated November 9, 1949 decreed installation of "Special technical and design bureaus" for a wide variety of civilian research and development, particularly in the "remote areas of the Union".

The 4th Special Department was disbanded in 1953.

== Notable sharashka inmates ==
- Robert Ludvigovich Bartini (or Roberto Oros di Bartini) an aircraft designer and scientist.
- Valentin Glushko, a chief rocket engine designer. (His biography at MN)
- Leonid Kerber, an aircraft radio equipment designer.
- Yuri Kondratyuk, a pioneer of astronautics and spaceflight, the inventor of the gravitational slingshot.
- Lev Kopelev, a writer, another inmate of Marfino (a prototype for Rubin from In the First Circle)
- Sergei Korolev, an aircraft and rocket designer, later the chief designer for the Soviet space program.
- Vladimir Myasishchev, an aircraft designer.
- Vladimir Petlyakov, the chief designer of the aircraft families Pe and VI
- Nikolai Nikolaevich Polikarpov, an aircraft designer (arrested for a brief period).
- Leonid Ramzin, the inventor of the straight-flow boiler
- Aleksandr Solzhenitsyn, a writer. His novel In the First Circle is a vivid account of life in sharashka Marfino.
- Léon Theremin, a pioneer of electronic music, the inventor of the theremin and a passive eavesdropping device.
- Nikolay Timofeev-Ressovsky, a geneticist and radiobiologist (His biography at genetics.org).
- Andrei Tupolev, the chief designer of the aircraft families Tu and ANT.
