= Petlyakov Pe-8 =

Soviet heavy bomber aircraft

Pe-8
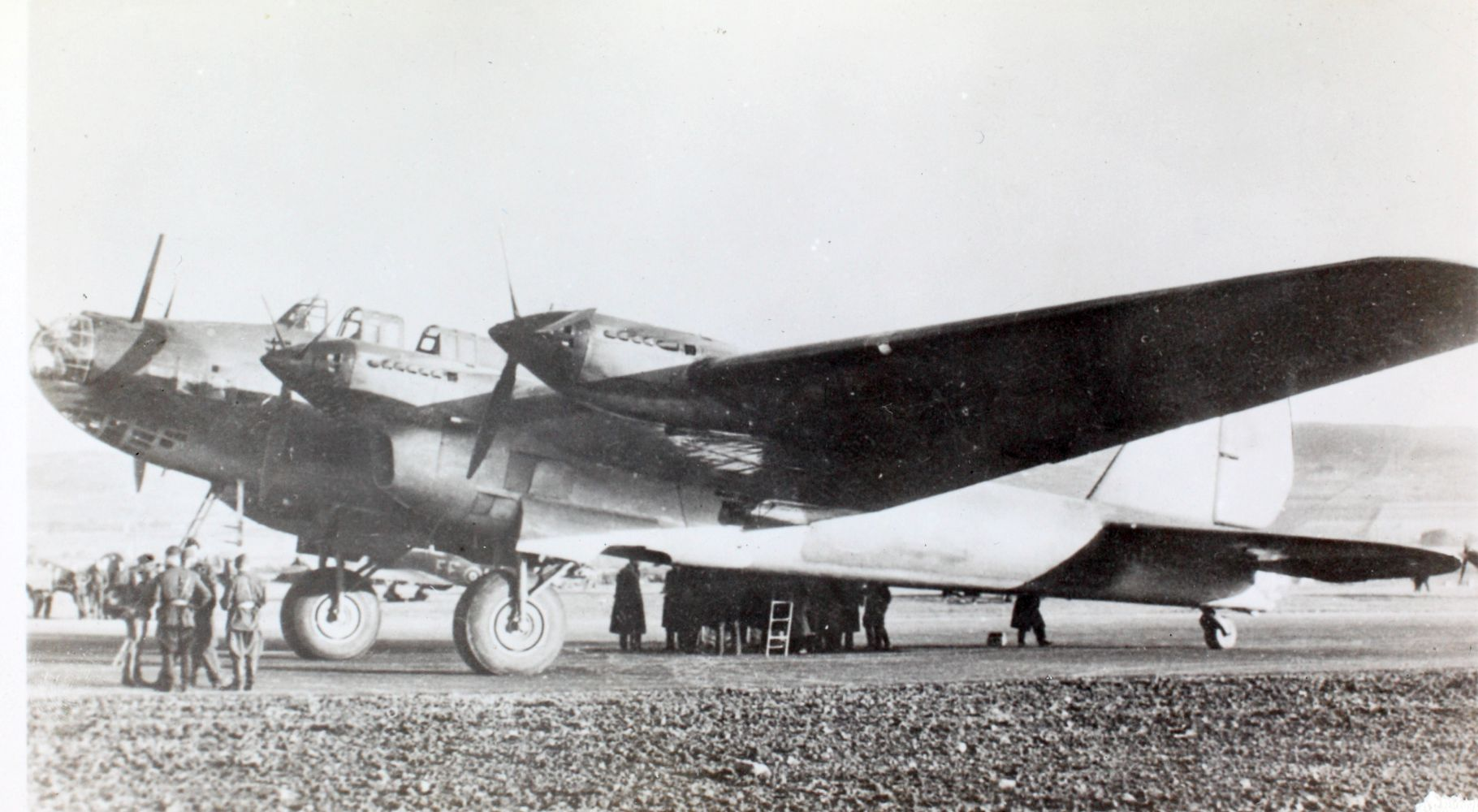

General information
- Type: Heavy bomber
- National origin: Soviet Union
- Designer: Petlyakov OKB
- Built by: Factory No. 124
- Status: Retired
- Primary user: Soviet Air Forces
- Number built: 93

History
- Manufactured: 1936–1944
- Introduction date: 1940
- First flight: 27 December 1936

The Petlyakov Pe-8 (Russian: Петляков Пе-8) was a Soviet heavy bomber designed before World War II, and the only four-engine bomber the USSR built during the war. Produced in limited numbers, it was used to bomb Berlin in August 1941. It was also used for so-called "morale raids" designed to raise the spirit of the Soviet people by exposing Axis vulnerabilities. Its primary mission, however, was to attack German airfields, rail yards and other rear-area facilities at night, although one was used to fly the People's Commissar of Foreign Affairs (Foreign Minister) Vyacheslav Molotov from Moscow to the United States in 1942.

Originally designated the TB-7, the aircraft was renamed the Pe-8 after its primary designer, Vladimir Petlyakov, died in a plane crash in 1942. Supply problems complicated the aircraft's production and the Pe-8s also had engine problems. As Soviet morale boosters, they were also high-value targets for the Luftwaffe's fighter pilots. The loss rate of these aircraft, whether from mechanical failure, friendly fire, or combat, doubled between 1942 and 1944.

By the end of the war, most of the surviving aircraft had been withdrawn from combat units. After the war, some were modified as transports for important officials, and a few others were used in various Soviet testing programs. Some supported the Soviet Arctic operations until the late 1950s.

== Design and development ==
Development of the Pe-8 began in July 1934, when the Soviet Air Forces (VVS) issued requirements for an aircraft to replace the obsolete and cumbersome Tupolev TB-3 heavy bomber. These requirements specified a bomber that could carry 2,000 kg (4,400 lb) of bombs 4,500 km (2,800 mi) at a speed greater than 440 km/h (270 mph) at an altitude of 10,000 metres (33,000 ft), figures that were twice the range, speed and service ceiling of the TB-3. The task was assigned to the Tupolev Design Bureau (OKB) where Andrei Tupolev handed the work to a team led by Vladimir Petlyakov and the project received the internal bureau designation of ANT-42. The resulting aircraft, a four-engined, mid-wing cantilever monoplane, was initially designated as the TB-7 (Russian: Тяжёлый Бомбардировщик, Tyazholy Bombardirovschik—Heavy Bomber) by the VVS and owed more to the streamlined design of the Tupolev SB than to the block-like design of the TB-3.

The bomber was built mainly of duralumin, with two steel spars in the wings, although the ailerons were fabric-covered. The pear-shaped monocoque fuselage required the pilots to sit in tandem, offset to the left. In the prototype, space for a fifth engine, an auxiliary Klimov M-100, was reserved inside the fuselage, in a fairing above the wing spars and behind the pilots. It was intended to drive a supercharger that supplied pressurized air to the Mikulin AM-34FRN engines, with the installation designated ATsN-2 (Russian: Agregat tsentral'novo nadduva—Central Supercharging Unit), an idea pioneered in 1918 by the Zeppelin-Staaken firm in the German Empire, and refined further for the Third Reich Luftwaffe's Do 217P and Hs 130E experimental bomber designs. Subsequent models of the Pe-8 omitted the internal engine, and provided seating for a flight engineer and radio operator, behind and below the pilots. The bombardier sat in the nose and manned a turret armed with a 20-millimeter (0.79 in) ShVAK cannon that covered a 120° cone ahead. A prominent chin gondola, nicknamed the 'beard', protruded beneath the nose. The dorsal gunner sat at the rear of the ATsN fairing with a sliding hood covering a 7.62-millimeter (0.30 in) ShKAS machine gun and another ShKAS mounted in a ventral hatch. The tail gunner had a powered turret with a ShVAK and, most unusually, there were manually operated ShVAK cannon mounted at the rear of each inner engine nacelle. Crewmen had access to these positions through the wing or by a trapdoor in the upper wing surface. The large internal bomb bay racks held up to 4,000 kg (8,800 lb) of bombs; external racks held a single 500-kilogram (1,100 lb) FAB-500 (Fugasnaya AviaBomba - high explosive bomb) bomb under each wing.

The maiden flight of the unarmed prototype, piloted by M. M. Gromov and without the ATsN installation, occurred at Khodynka Aerodrome on 27 December 1936. After successful initial trials, the ATsN system was installed for the State acceptance trials in August 1937 and the AM-34RNB engines were fitted during the tests. Gromov reported that the rudder was ineffective and that the outer engines overheated. Subsequent wind tunnel testing identified a problem with the aerodynamics of the radiators and nacelles. To solve this problem, the outer engines' radiators were moved into deep ducts under the inner nacelles. The Pe-8 now featured only two pronounced radiator intakes, one under each inner engine, each shared by both inner and outer engines, one of the distinctive and unique features of the aircraft. The rudder was also enlarged and redesigned with a smooth skin.

Construction of a second prototype began in April 1936, incorporating lessons from the first aircraft and feedback from the VVS. Designers widened the fuselage by 100 mm (3.9 in); the 'beard' was also widened and the tail section was modified to lessen resistance and improve rudder function. A reconfigured control system included an autopilot and the engineers redesigned portions of the electrical system. The engines were changed to the more powerful AM-34FRNVs and a redesigned undercarriage was fitted to the airframe. Two additional fuel tanks increased the craft's range. The defensive and offensive armament was revised, and the bomber's weaponry expanded to twin ShKAS guns in the nose, nacelle barbettes and tail turrets and a dorsal turret with a ShVAK; this design eliminated the ventral gun. The bomb bay was modified to allow for a single 5,000-kilogram (11,000 lb) FAB-5000 bomb to be carried and provisions were added to carry VAP-500 or VAP-1000 poison gas dispensers under the wings.

The arrests of both Tupolev and Petlyakov in October 1937, during the Great Purge, disrupted the program and the second prototype did not make its first flight until 26 July 1938. Although this prototype served as the basis for the series aircraft, further modifications were made to the armament. New weaponry included a retractable ShVAK in the MV-6 dorsal turret, another ShVAK in a KEB tail turret and a 12.7-millimeter (0.50 in) Berezin UBT machine gun in each ShU barbette in each inner engine nacelle, on the underside of the wing covering the lower rear arc of fire to left and right, respectively. Another fuel tank further increased the range, and the 'beard' was removed entirely, replaced by a more streamlined nose. Authorization for production was slow for several reasons, including the Great Purge, but also due to the scarcity of resources, and a shortage of workers. Although production facilities in the Kazan Factory No. 124 were ready as early as 1937, the order to begin was not given until 1939.

=== Manufacture and supply problems ===
Engine supply problems complicated the construction of the aircraft. Production of the ATsN superchargers could not be organized in any systematic way and only the first four Pe-8s were equipped with them. Factory No. 124 shut down its Pe-8 production line at the beginning of 1940 while alternative engines were evaluated. Somewhere in the massive Soviet chain of command, the decision was made to proceed without the superchargers. The unavailability of the Klimov M-100 engine of the ATsN-2 installation required a design change, although this modification allowed a commander and radio operator to be carried in its place. Then, to compound the problem further, the production of AM-34FRNV engines ended in the second half of 1939. Only two or four Pe-8s were equipped with them. Eighteen of the aircraft produced by the end of 1940 were fitted with AM-35A engines.

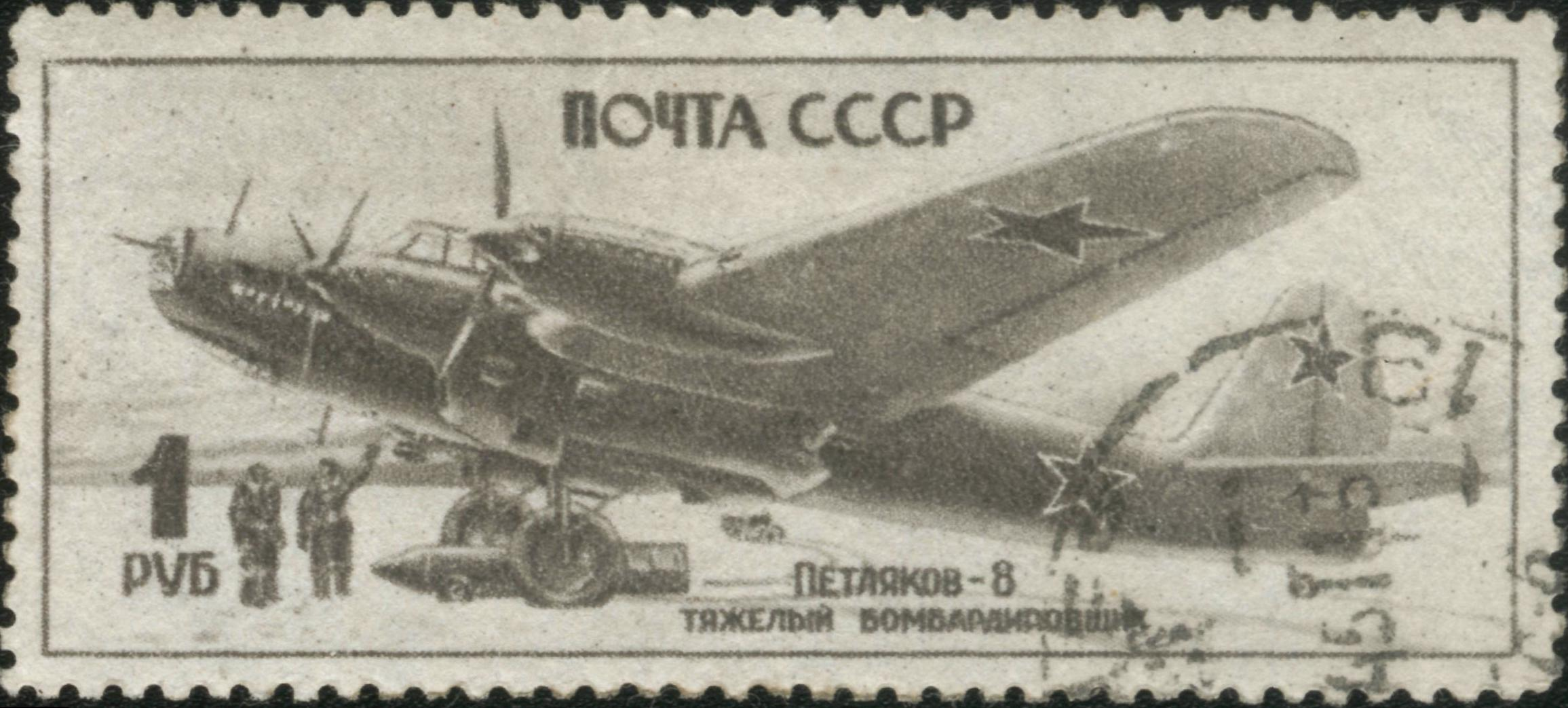
A Soviet stamp that reads "Post USSR / 1 Rub / Petlyakov-8 / Heavy bomber"

In 1940, six aircraft without engines were fitted with Mikulin AM-35A engines, while VVS officials evaluated both the Charomskiy ACh-30 and Charomskiy M-40 aircraft Diesel engines. At least nine Pe-8s were fitted with diesel engines in 1941, but neither the ACh-30 nor the M-40 were entirely satisfactory, despite greatly increasing the range of the aircraft. All surviving Pe-8s were re-engined with AM-35As by the end of 1941. Production continued slowly at Factory No. 124; most of the factory's resources were devoted to the higher-priority Petlyakov Pe-2, a successful light bomber. At this time, most of these aircraft, re-designated as the Pe-8 after Petlyakov was killed in a Pe-2 crash on 12 January 1942, were built with out-of-production AM-35A engines.

The 1,380-kW (1,850-hp) Shvetsov ASh-82 radial engine was proposed as a replacement to alleviate the shortage of engines and this modification went into production in late 1942. The exhaust arrangements of the ASh-82 were not compatible with the gun turrets in the rear of the engine nacelles and the guns were removed, reducing the aircraft's defensive capability. At the end of 1943, the nose turret was deleted in favor of a manually operated ShKAS machine gun in a more streamlined nose. This version of the aircraft proved to have much the same range as the diesel-engined versions, but reliability was greatly improved. Production of the Pe-8s totaled 93.

The last Pe-8s were completed in 1944 as Pe-8ONs (Osobovo Naznacheniya—Special Mission) with Charomskiy ACh-30B engines and a fillet at the base of the vertical stabilizer. These were special VIP transports with a seating capacity of twelve and a cargo capacity of 1,200 kilograms (2,600 lb). Sources disagree as to whether the armament was removed and, if it was, whether partly or entirely.

== Operational history ==
=== Wartime use ===
When Operation Barbarossa began on 22 June 1941, only the 2nd Squadron of the 14th Heavy Bomber Regiment (Tyazholy Bombardirovochnyy Avia Polk—TBAP), based at Boryspil was equipped with Pe-8s, but was not ready for combat. Two of its nine Pe-8s were destroyed by German air strikes shortly after the war began, before the Pe-8s were withdrawn out of reach of German bombers to Kazan. Stalin ordered that the squadron be reformed into a regiment, and that it strike targets deep inside German territory. Theoretically, this tactic would boost Soviet morale by demonstrating the vulnerability of the enemy. The squadron was re-designated on 29 June as the 412th TBAP and began training for long-range missions. On or about 27 July it was again renamed, this time as the 432nd TBAP. On the evening of 10 August, eight M-40-engined Pe-8s of the 432nd TBAP, accompanied by Yermolaev Yer-2s of the 420th Long-Range Bomber Aviation Regiment (DBAP), attempted to bomb Berlin from Pushkino Airfield near Leningrad. One heavily loaded Pe-8 crashed immediately upon take off, after it lost an engine. Only four managed to reach Berlin, or its outskirts, and of those, only two returned to their base. The others landed elsewhere or crash-landed in Finland and Estonia. The aircraft of the commander of the 81st Long-Range Bomber Division, Combrig Mikhail Vodopianov, to which both regiments belonged, was attacked mistakenly by Polikarpov I-16s from Soviet Naval Aviation over the Baltic Sea and lost an engine; later, before he could reach Berlin, German flak punctured a fuel tank. He crash-landed his aircraft in southern Estonia. Five more Pe-8s were lost during the operation, largely due to the unreliability of the M-40s. Seven Pe-8s were lost during the month of August alone, rendering the regiment ineffective. During this period, the surviving aircraft were re-equipped with AM-35As, which gave them a shorter range, but a more reliable engine.

By 1 October 1941, the regiment mustered fourteen Pe-8s after having been replenished by new aircraft from the factory. It spent the rest of the year conducting night raids on Berlin, Königsberg, Danzig and as well as German-occupied cities in the Soviet Union. The regiment was re-designated as the 746th Separate Long-Range Aviation Regiment (Russian: Otdel'nyy Avia Polk Dahl'nevo Deystviya—OAPDD) on 3 December. No aircraft were reported on hand two days later after this designation, but eleven were on strength on 18 March 1942. During the winter of 1941–42, the regiment was assigned the destruction of a railroad bridge over the Volga River, near Kalinin. In April 1942, one aircraft flew diplomatic personnel and mail on a non-stop flight from Moscow to Great Britain. This was a test run for a flight carrying Soviet Foreign Minister Molotov and his delegation from Moscow to London and then to Washington, D.C., and back, for negotiations to open a second front against Nazi Germany (19 May – 13 June 1942). The flight crossed German-controlled airspace on the return trip without incident. From August 1941 to May 1942, the regiment flew 226 sorties and dropped 606 tonnes (596 long tons; 668 short tons) of bombs. In the course of these missions, they lost 14 bombers, 5 in combat, and the rest from engine malfunction. The regiment received 17 Pe-8s as replacements. Sixteen aircraft were on hand on 1 May 1942, but the number had increased only to seventeen two months later; the regiment was losing aircraft almost as fast as they were being replaced.

The 890th Long-Range Aviation Regiment (Russian: Avia Polk Dahl'nevo Deystviya—APDD) was formed on 15 June 1942 and both regiments were used to bomb German-held transportation centers of, among others, Orel, Bryansk, Kursk and Poltava. The pace of activity increased and the regiments flew as many missions in August as they had in the first ten months of the war. By the eve of the Soviet counterattack at Stalingrad, Operation Uranus, on 8 November the regiments had fourteen Pe-8s on hand. Under the command of the 45th Long-Range Bomber Aviation Division (Russian: Dal'nebombardirovochnaya Aviatsionnaya Diviziya—DBAD), they did not participate in the Stalingrad air attacks.

In 1943, from the division's primary airfield at Kratovo, southeast of Moscow, the regiments bombed transportation centers, airfields and troop concentrations. The railroad yard at Gomel was a favorite target and the regiment dropped approximately 606 tonnes (596 long tons; 668 short tons) of bombs there between February and September 1943. It is not clear if these sorties were made by Pe-8s alone or in combination with other aircraft. In addition, the regiment dropped the first FAB-5000 bomb on Königsberg in April 1943, continuing the pin-prick attacks against targets deep in the German rear. In May 1943, efforts shifted to disrupt the German concentration of forces for the Battle of Kursk. In one sortie, the 109 bombers of the 45th DBAD struck the rail junction at Orsha during the evening of 4 May, most of which were not Pe-8s; the German High Command reported the destruction of 300 rail wagons and 3 ammunition trains.

By 1 July, the regiment had 18 Pe-8s for deployment during the early phase of the Battle of Kursk. The long-range aviation units continued to attack targets in the German rear areas at night, supporting the Soviet ground offensive in the Orel Bulge, called Operation Kutuzov, that began on 12 July. The Germans had transferred the nightfighters of the Fourth Group of the 5th Night Fighter Wing (IV./Nachtjagdgeschwader 5), flying a mix of Junkers Ju 88 and Dornier Do 217 aircraft, to counter the Soviet raids near the Orel area. Initially, the night fighters were ineffective against the Soviet raids, until the deployment of their ground radar "eyes". Once the Germans had use of their radar, after the night of 17–18 July, Soviet losses increased sharply. Although the Germans flew only fourteen sorties that night, they claimed eight kills (of course, throughout the war, night or day, the number of kills claimed was inevitably significantly higher than the actual number shot down, regardless of nationality or aircraft type). On the night of 20–21 July, Captain (Hauptmann) Heinrich Prinz zu Sayn-Wittgenstein, commander of IV./NJG 5, claimed to have shot down three himself. The exhaust plume of the ASh-82 engine may have been a contributing factor; the engines lacked flame dampening exhausts, making their plume visible from a distance. Despite its losses, the 746th was re-designated as the 25th Long-Range Guards Aviation Regiment (GAPDD) on 18 September 1943 in recognition of its achievements.

=== Removal from combat ===
The loss of Pe-8s to all causes—mechanical, combat, friendly fire—had steadily increased from one aircraft per 103 flights in 1942 to one per 46 sorties in 1944. Despite the losses, production kept pace with need. The number of aircraft belonging to the 45th DBAD continued to rise; 20 were on hand on 1 January 1944 and 30 on 1 June. The Pe-8s flew 276 sorties in 1944 against such targets as Helsinki, Tallinn and Pskov. Aviation historian Yefim Gordon maintains that the Pe-8 flew its last mission on the night of 1–2 August 1944, but the Statistical Digest of the VVS contradicts this claim, showing 31 Pe-8s assigned to 45th DBAD on 1 January 1945 and 32 on hand on 10 May 1945. However, during this period the 45th DBAD only had three regiments, none of which used the Pe-8 as their primary aircraft, so while the 45th DBAD may have had Pe-8s, these may not have been in use as the primary combat aircraft.

The 890th began to fly Lend-Lease B-25 Mitchells in the spring of 1944 and was itself re-designated as the 890th Bomber Aviation Regiment on 26 December 1944. The 362nd APDD was formed in early 1944 with four Pe-8s received from the other two regiments, but these were returned in the spring of 1944, when the regiment began to convert to the Lend-Lease Mitchells.

=== Post-war use ===
After the war, the Pe-8 was used extensively as a testbed for trials involving Soviet derivatives of the German V-1 flying bomb and it was designated as the Pe-8LL for prototype piston engine trials. It was also used as a mother ship for the experimental rocket-engined Bisnovat 5 in 1948–49. Aeroflot received several of the surviving Pe-8s for polar exploration. Their military equipment removed, they had additional fuel tanks installed, were painted orange, and had their engines upgraded to either ASh-82FNs or Shvetsov ASh-73s. One landed at the North Pole in 1954 and others helped to monitor the drift ice stations NP-2, NP-3 and NP-4 during the late 1950s.

== Operators ==
Soviet Union

- Soviet Air Forces

== Specifications (Pe-8/AM-35A) ==
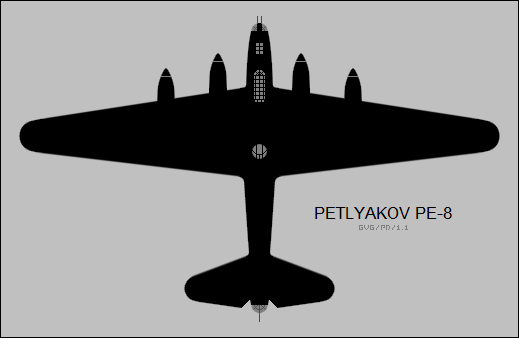
Petlyakov Pe-8

Data from Gordon, Soviet Airpower in World War 2, p. 398

General characteristics

- Crew: 11
- Length: 23.2 m (76 ft 1 in)
- Wingspan: 39.13 m (128 ft 5 in)
- Height: 6.2 m (20 ft 4 in)
- Wing area: 188.66 m^{2} (2,030.7 sq ft)
- Airfoil: root: TsAGI-40 (19%); tip: TsAGI-40 (15.5%)
- Empty weight: 18,571 kg (40,942 lb)
- Gross weight: 27,000 kg (59,525 lb)
- Max takeoff weight: 35,000 kg (77,162 lb)
- Powerplant: 4 × Mikulin AM-35A V-12 liquid-cooled piston engines, 999 kW (1,340 hp) each
- Propellers: 3-bladed constant-speed propellers

Performance

- Maximum speed: 443 km/h (275 mph, 239 kn)
- Range: 3,700 km (2,300 mi, 2,000 nmi)
- Service ceiling: 9,300 m (30,500 ft)
- Rate of climb: 5.9 m/s (1,160 ft/min)
- Wing loading: 143 kg/m^{2} (29 lb/sq ft)
- Power/mass: 0.140 kW/kg (0.085 hp/lb)

Armament

- Guns:
  - 2 × 20 mm (0.8 in) ShVAK cannons (dorsal and tail turrets)
  - 2 × 12.7 mm (0.50 in) UBT machine guns (engine nacelles)
  - 2 × 7.62 mm (0.30 in) ShKAS machine guns (nose turret)
- Bombs: Up to 5,000 kg (11,000 lb), including the FAB 5000 5,000 kg bomb

== See also ==
Aircraft of comparable role, configuration, and era

- Avro Lancaster
- Boeing B-17 Flying Fortress
- Boeing XB-15
- Heinkel He 177
- Nakajima G5N
- Nakajima G8N
- Piaggio P.108
- Short Stirling

Related lists

- List of aircraft of World War II
- List of bomber aircraft
- List of military aircraft of the Soviet Union and the CIS
