= Petlyakov =

V.M. Petlyakov Design Bureau (Russian: Опытное конструкторское бюро Петлякова, Opytnoe Konstructorskoe Byuro Petlyakova) was a Soviet OKB (design bureau) for military aircraft, headed by designer Vladimir Petlyakov. Following his death in 1942, the bureau was controlled by Izakson, Putliov, and Myasishchyev before being dissolved in 1946.

== Developments ==
- Pe-2 'Buck'/PB-100, 1939.
  - VI-100/"100" prototype, "high altitude fighter", 1939.
  - Pe-2I fighter
  - Pe-3 multirole fighter, 207 were built, 1941.
    - Pe-3bis multirole fighter, about 300 were built, 1941.
  - Pe-4 Pe-2 with Klimov VK-105PF engines.
  - Vb-109 (by V.Myasichev) high-altitude bomber.
- Pe-8/TB-7 The only four-engined bomber the USSR used during World War II, 1935.
