= Vladimir Petlyakov =

Soviet aerospace engineer

- Владимир Петляков
- Born: 15 June 1891; Sambek, Don Host Oblast, Russian Empire
- Died: 12 January 1942 (aged 50); Mamashevo, Sergachsky District, Gorky Oblast, Russian SFSR, Soviet Union
- Engineering career
- Discipline: Aeronautical Engineering
- Employer: Petlyakov Design Bureau
- Significant design: Pe-2, Pe-8

Vladimir Mikhailovich Petlyakov (Russian: Влади́мир Миха́йлович Петляко́в; 15 June 1891 – 12 January 1942) was a Soviet aeronautical engineer and aircraft designer.

Born in 1891 in Sambek, Don Host Oblast, Russian Empire (in present-day Neklinovsky District, Rostov Oblast of the Russian Federation), where his father served as a local official, Petlykov graduated from the Technical College in Taganrog (now "Taganrog Petlyakov Aviation College", Таганрогский авиационный колледж им. В. М. Петлякова). In 1910 he travelled to Moscow and started studying at the Moscow State Technical University; however, due to financial difficulties he failed to complete his studies. After the 1917 Russian Revolution he continued his education and was hired to work as a technician in the aerodynamics laboratory at Moscow State Technical University under the guidance of Nikolai Zhukovsky, while resuming his studies. He gained experience as a laboratory assistant on wind tunnels and on calculations for aircraft design. In 1922 he graduated from the same university.

From 1921 to 1936 Petlyakov worked at the Central Aerohydrodynamic Institute (TsAGI) (Russian: Центральный аэрогидродинамический институт (ЦАГИ)) under the guidance of Andrei Tupolev; there he became involved in wing-design and in the development of gliders. In 1936 he became a chief aircraft-designer at an aviation plant. Petlyakov was directly involved in the organization and development of Soviet metal-aircraft construction. In particular, Petlyakov (together with the engineer Nikolai Belyaev) elaborated methods of calculating durability of materials and theory on designing metal wings with multiple spars. Petlyakov assisted in designing the first Soviet heavy bombers — TB-1, TB-3 (1930–1935) — and a long-range high-altitude four-engine bomber, the Pe-8 (1935–1937).

On 21 October 1937, Petlyakov, together with Tupolev and the entire directorate of the TsAGI, was arrested on trumped-up charges of sabotage, espionage and of aiding the Russian Fascist Party. Many of his colleagues were executed. In 1939 he was moved from a prison to an NKVD sharashka for aircraft-designers near Moscow, where many ex-TsAGI people had already been sent to work. Petlyakov received the task of designing a high-altitude fighter, which he successfully accomplished. Operational experience in the Soviet-Finnish War of 1939–1940 and the success of Luftwaffe dive-bombers in the campaigns of 1939 and 1940 showed that this plane (the VI-100, Russian: ВИ-100) was not what the Soviet Air Force needed, and Lavrentiy Beria, head of the NKVD and of the sharashka system, ordered the redesign of the fighter as a dive bomber, with the promise that Petlyakov and his colleagues would be released on its successful completion.

The resulting aircraft, the Pe-2, which went into serial production at the Kazan Aviation Plant, proved to be one of the most successful designs of World War II. Petlyakov, released from the Gulag in 1940, was awarded a Stalin Prize (First Class) in 1941. At Kazan he faced increasing difficulties, with many of his trained technicians and machinists conscripted into the Soviet military and sent to the front lines, which adversely affected the quality of aircraft production. He protested to Soviet senior leadership, and while on his way to Moscow in January 1942 (flying in a Pe-2) he died in an air crash near Arzamas. His grave is at the Arskoe Cemetery in Kazan.

Vladimir Petlyakov received a Stalin prize (1941) and was awarded two Orders of Lenin and an Order of the Red Star.
