= Andrei Tupolev =

Soviet aerospace engineer (1888–1972)

- Андрей Туполев
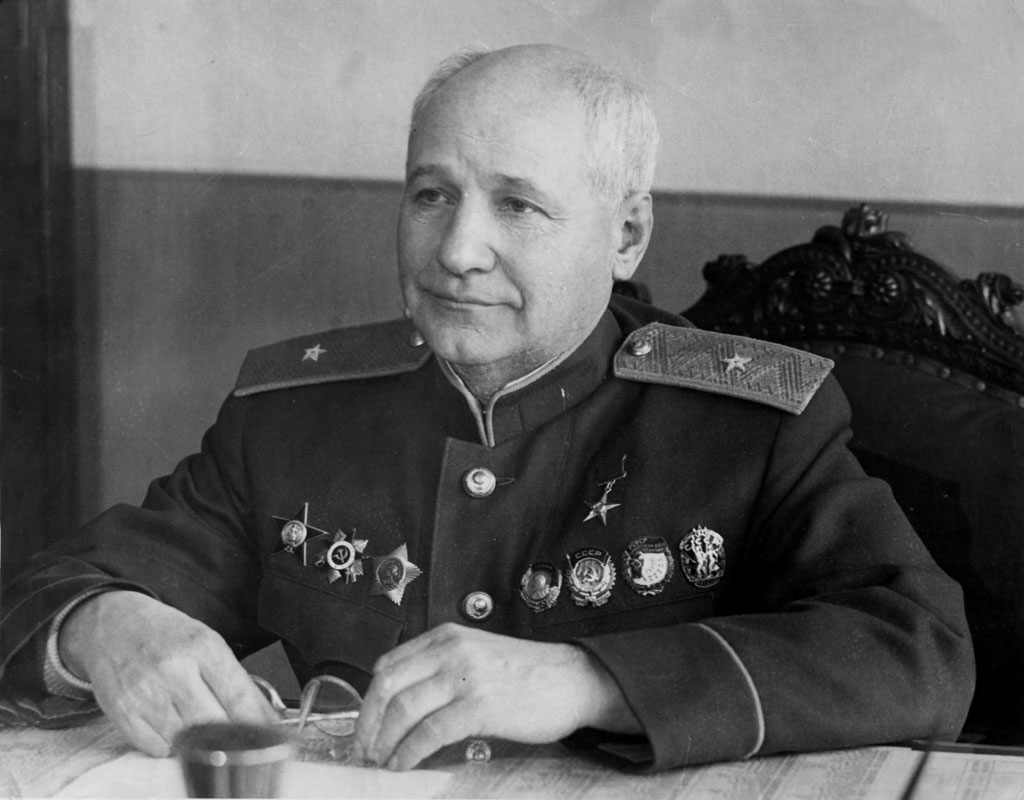
- Tupolev in 1944
- Born: 10 November 1888; Pustomazovo, Russian Empire
- Died: 23 December 1972 (aged 84); Moscow, Soviet Union
- Resting place: Novodevichy Cemetery
- Education: Imperial Moscow Technical School
- Engineering career
- Discipline: Aeronautical Engineering
- Employer: Tupolev Design Bureau
- Significant design: Tu-95, Tu-104
- Awards: Hero of Socialist Labor; Order of Lenin; Order of the Red Banner of Labour

Signature
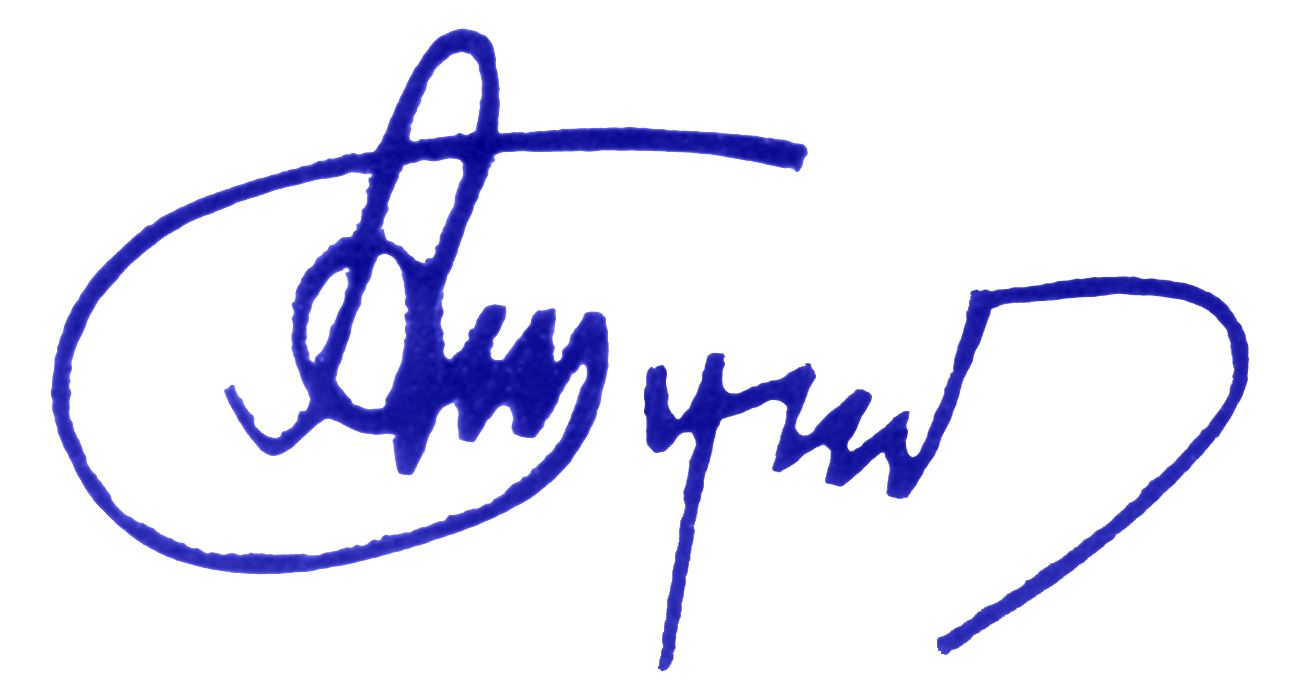

Andrei Nikolayevich Tupolev (Russian: Андрей Николаевич Туполев; 10 November [O.S. 29 October] 1888 – 23 December 1972) was a Russian and later Soviet aeronautical engineer known for his pioneering aircraft designs as the director of the Tupolev Design Bureau.

Tupolev was an early pioneer of aeronautics in Russia and served as a protégé of Nikolay Zhukovsky. Tupolev designed or oversaw the design of more than 100 types of civilian and military aircraft in the Soviet Union over 50 years, some of which set 78 world records. Tupolev produced many notable designs such as the Tu-2, Tu-16, Tu-95, and Tu-104, and the reverse engineered Tu-4.

Tupolev was highly honoured in the Soviet Union and awarded various titles and honours including the Hero of Socialist Labor three times, Order of Lenin eight times, Order of the Red Banner of Labour two times, made an academician of the Russian Academy of Sciences in 1953, and a Colonel-General of the Soviet Air Force in 1968. Tupolev was also honoured outside the Soviet Union as an honorary member of the British Royal Aeronautical Society and the American Institute of Aeronautics and Astronautics in recognition of his work. In 2018, Vnukovo International Airport was formally renamed to Vnukovo Andrei Tupolev International Airport in his honour.

== Early life ==
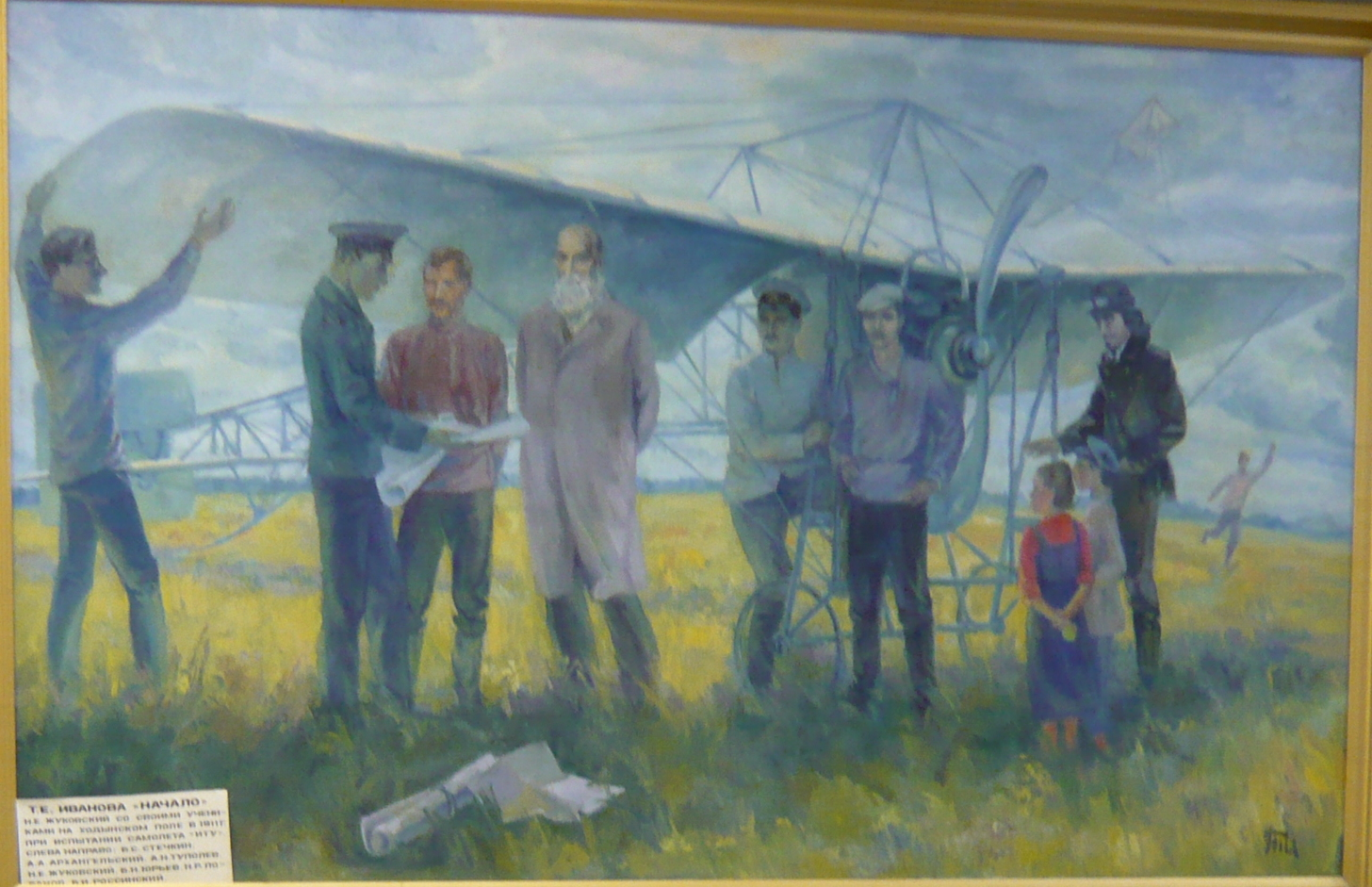
The Beginning by Tatyana Ivanova, depicting Tupolev (in cherry-coloured kosovorotka shirt), Nikolay Zhukovsky, and other Russian aviation pioneers at Khodynka Field, preparing the ITU monoplane for a test flight in 1911.

External image
- Tupolev takes off on a glider during a test flight from the snow-covered Khodynka Field in 1910.

Andrei Nikolayevich Tupolev was born on 10 November [O.S. 29 October] 1888 in Pustomazovo (Russian: Пустомазово), a village near the city of Kimry in Tver Governorate, Russian Empire, the sixth of seven children born to his Russian parents. Tupolev's father, Nikolai Ivanovich Tupolev (1842–1911), was a native of Surgut, who worked as a notary for the governorate. Nikolai had studied law at St. Petersburg University, but was expelled after the assassination of Alexander II for his ties to revolutionaries despite not being involved in their actions. Tupolev's mother, Anna Vasilievna (née Lisitsyna) (1850–1928) was born in Torzhok in the family of a judicial investigator, and graduated from the Mariinsky Gymnasium in Tver. Anna's parents purchased the small estate in Pustomazovo where Tupolev was born. After first being educated at home, Tupolev studied at the Gymnasium in Tver and finished in 1908. Tupolev then applied for courses at two Russian universities: Imperial Moscow Technical School (IMTU) and the Imperial Moscow Engineering School. Tupolev was accepted at both, but ultimately chose to attend at IMTU.

In 1909, Tupolev began studying aerodynamics under the Russian aviation pioneer Nikolay Zhukovsky, and volunteered for the Aeronautical workshop (Kruzhok) headed by Zhukovsky. In 1910, together with his workshop friends, Tupolev built and test piloted his first glider. During his workshop days, Tupolev also built a wind tunnel which led to the formation of an aerodynamic laboratory at IMTU. In 1911, Tupolev was accused of taking part in revolutionary activities, including demonstrations and distribution of subversive literature, and was arrested. Tupolev was later released on condition that he return to his family home in Pustomazovo. Tupolev was only allowed to return to IMTU in 1914, studying during World War I and the Russian Revolution. Tupolev completed his studies in 1918 and was awarded the degree of Engineer-Mechanic when he presented his thesis on the development of seaplanes. By 1920, the IMTU had been renamed the Moscow Higher Technical School (MVTU) and Tupolev was teaching a course there on the basics of aerodynamic calculations.

== Aircraft design ==
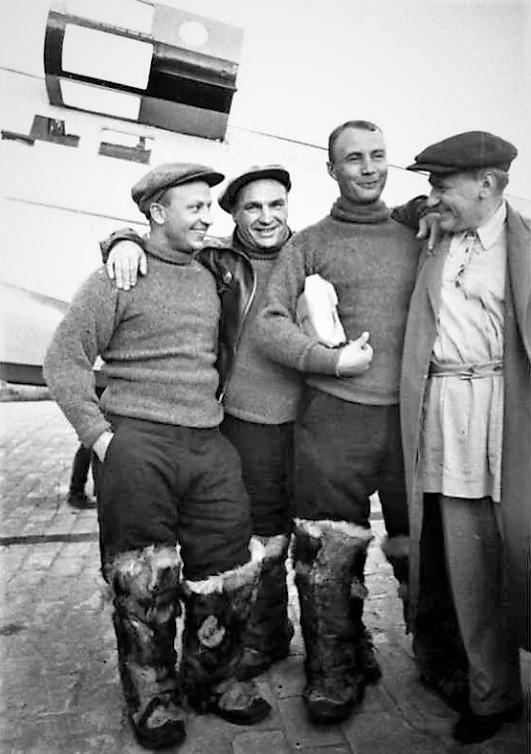
Tupolev (right) with the crew of the ANT-25 aircraft at the Shchyolkovo airfield in 1936. Photo by Mikhail Kalashnikov.

=== Central Aerohydrodynamic Institute ===
Tupolev was a leading figure of the Moscow-based Central Aerohydrodynamic Institute (TsAGI; Russian: Центральный аэро-гидродинамический институт; ЦАГИ) from 1929 until his death in 1972. The Central Design Office or TsKB (Russian: Центральное конструкторское бюро; ЦКБ) based there produced bombers for the Soviet Air Force and some airliners, which in the years before World War II and especially in his 1930s-era designs, were based partially on the all-metal aircraft design concepts pioneered by Hugo Junkers. In 1925, Tupolev designed a twin-engine bomber, the TB-1, which was considered one of the most advanced designs of the time. By 1934, Tupolev had led the design bureau that designed the largest aircraft flying in the world at the time, the 63-meter wingspan, eight-engined Maksim Gorki, again built with the Junkers metal structure airframe concepts. In 1937, an improved version of the earlier TB-1, the four-engined TB-3, made a landing at the North Pole. As the number of qualified aircraft designers increased, Tupolev set up his own office, producing a number of designs designated with the prefix ANT (Russian: АНТ) from his initials.

=== Sharashka ===
However, on 21 October 1937, Tupolev was arrested together with Vladimir Petlyakov and the entire directorate of the TsAGI and EDO during the Great Purge on trumped up charges of sabotage, espionage and of aiding the Russian Fascist Party. Many of his colleagues were executed but Tupolev himself was imprisoned. In 1939, Tupolev was moved from a prison to an NKVD sharashka for aircraft designers in Bolshevo near Moscow, where many surviving ex-TsAGI people had already been sent to work. The sharashka soon moved to Moscow and was dubbed "Tupolevka" after Tupolev, its most prominent inmate. In 1940, Tupolev was tried and convicted with a ten-year sentence, and during this time he developed the Tupolev Tu-2 which would become one of the most important aircraft of World War II. Tupolev was released in July 1941 around the time of the German invasion of the Soviet Union to "conduct important defence work" but was not fully rehabilitated by the Soviet state until 1955, two years after Joseph Stalin's death.

=== Post-war ===
Tupolev headed the B-4 project, as it was initially designated, to reverse engineer the American Boeing B-29 Superfortress strategic bomber, which had been the first aircraft to deliver a nuclear weapon. The Soviet Union had repeatedly asked for B-29s through the World War II Lend Lease program but these requests were all denied by the US. Tupolev succeeded in the complex task of re-engineering the design with Russian engines, weapons, equipment and airfoil sections, while using available metric sheetmetal which required a nearly complete redesign as the original had been built to imperial measurements, while new alloys also had to be brought into production. They used four B-29s which had come down in Soviet controlled territory as references, after having sustained light damage while bombing Japan in 1945. Tupolev's own design for the role had been ignored in the interest of getting the new long range bomber into service as rapidly as possible to respond to the multiple illegal American overflights, mostly with Martin PBM-5 Mariners that had already begun, and the overt threat of nuclear attack. Tupolev had several examples of the resulting Tu-4 flying in time for the 1947 May Day parade.

By the time of his rehabilitation on 9 April 1955, Tupolev had designed and was about to start testing his unique turboprop strategic bomber, the Tu-95. In the following years, Tupolev overcame competition from Vladimir Myasishchev and his M-4 series of jet-powered strategic bombers, to get the Tu-16 design into service. This was in part thanks to Tupolev's close rapport with Nikita Khrushchev, the new leader of the Soviet Union who had denounced Stalin's terror, of which Tupolev had been a victim. At about the same time, Tupolev introduced into service the Tu-104, the world's second operational production jet airliner.

== Later years and death ==
After Khruschev's removal from office in late 1964 and the rise of Leonid Brezhnev, the ageing Tupolev gradually lost positions at the centres of Soviet power to rivals in the aircraft industry. The prestigious Tu-144 programme enjoyed top level support until 1973, as did the important Tu-154 airliner, but the favored position the Tupolev Design Bureau enjoyed through Tupolev's personal political connections was largely eclipsed by the Ilyushin aircraft manufacturing and design company. To his contemporaries, Tupolev was known as a witty but crude master of obscene vocabulary who invariably and energetically insisted on fast and adequate technical fixes at the expense of scholastic ideal solutions. A hallmark of Tupolev was to get an aeroplane into service very rapidly, then began an often interminable process of improving the shortcomings of the "quick and dirty" initial design. To his competitors among the Soviet aircraft design community, he was known above all as politically astute; a shrewd and unforgiving rival.

Tupolev died on 23 December 1972 and was buried in Novodevichy Cemetery in Moscow.

=== Memorials ===
Various streets in cities across the Eastern Bloc were named in honour of Tupolev, as well as one in Western Europe, the Tupolevlaan near Amsterdam Airport Schiphol.

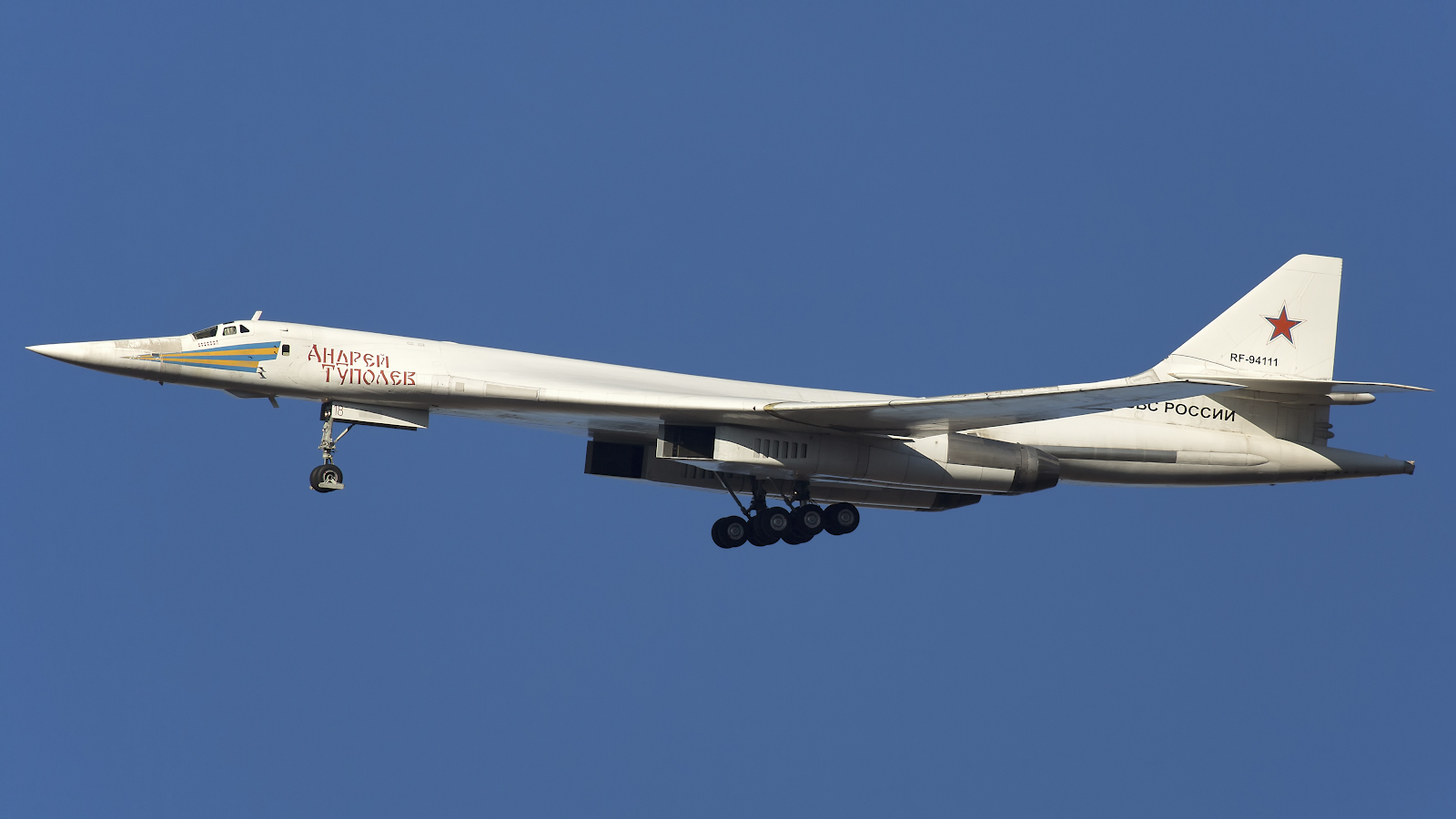
Russian strategic bomber Tupolev Tu-160 named after Andrei Nikolayevich Tupolev

In 1973, the Kazan Aviation Institute was named after Tupolev, and a monument of him was erected in Kazan in a public square at the intersection of Dekabristov, Gagarin and Korolev Streets. In 1979, a bust of Tupolev was erected at a public square in Kimry, near his birthplace Pustomazovo which no longer exists. Another memorial to Tupolev was erected in the estimated location of Pustomazovo in the present-day Ustinovo, north of Kimry in Kimrsky District, Tver Oblast. The local high school in Ustinovo was renamed after Tupolev and a memorial plaque was installed. In 1988, the Soviet Union issued a postage stamp dedicated to Tupolev. The 1979 biographical film Poema o kryl'yakh (Поэма о крыльях) directed by Daniil Khrabrovitsky is about the life and works of Tupolev and Igor Sikorsky, the Russian-American aviation pioneer. Prospekt Tupoleva, the main avenue in the Aviatsionny microdistrict of Domodedovo located next to Domodedovo Airport, was named after Tupolev. A memorial mural of Tupolev was painted on the side of the 20 Prospekt Tupoleva apartment building. In 2018, Vnukovo International Airport in Moscow was formally renamed to Vnukovo Andrei Tupolev International Airport.

On December 1, 2022, in honor of the 100th anniversary of aircraft designer Andrei Tupolev, his first monument was opened in Moscow. He appeared next to the building of the design bureau on the embankment of Academician Tupolev in the square of the same name. The sculpture is made of bronze and represents the figure of an aircraft designer and the outline of a Tu-144 taking off.

== Personal life ==
Tupolev was married to Yuliya Nikolaevna Tupoleva (née Zheltyakova) until her death in 1962. Tupolev's daughter Yuliya (1920–2011) was a doctor who was awarded the title of Honored Doctor of the Russian Federation. Tupolev's son Aleksey (1925-2001) was a successful pioneering aircraft designer who designed the Tupolev Tu-144 supersonic passenger jet, and helped design the Buran space shuttle and the Tu-2000 long-range heavy bomber.

Tupolev was never a member of the Communist Party of the Soviet Union despite his status and being elected to several deputy positions.

== Awards and honors ==
- Hero of Socialist Labour, three times (1945, 1957, 1972)
- Eight Orders of Lenin (1933, 1945, 1947, January 1949, December 1949, 1953, 1958, 1968)
- Order of the October Revolution (1971)
- Order of the Red Banner of Labour, twice (1927, 1933)
- Order of the Red Star (1933)
- Order of the Badge of Honour (1936)
- Order of Suvorov second degree (1944)
- Order of the Patriotic War first degree (1943)
- Lenin Prize (1957)
- Four Stalin Prizes first degree (1943, 1948, 1949, 1952)
- USSR State Prize (1972)
- Order of Georgi Dimitrov (People's Republic of Bulgaria, 1964)
- Laureate of the Zhukovskii Academy of Sciences of the USSR (1958)
- Gold Medal of the FAI Aviation (1958)
- Leonardo da Vinci Prize (1971)
- Gold Medal of the Society of the founders of Air France (1971)
- Honorary Fellow of the Royal Aeronautical Society of Great Britain (1970) and the American Institute of Aeronautics and Astronautics (1971)
- Honorary Citizen of Paris (1964), New York and the city of Zhukovsky, Moscow Oblast (1968)
- Inducted into the International Air & Space Hall of Fame at the San Diego Air & Space Museum in 1988.
- دبلوم صنايع جامعة الدقاهلية

== Aircraft designed by Andrei Tupolev ==
List (partial) of retired or active aircraft designed or made by aviation designer/engineer Andrei Tupolev; incl. both military and civilian planes, jets and other aircraft:

- Tupolev Tu-2
- Tupolev Tu-16
- Tupolev Tu-22
- Tupolev Tu-95/Tupolev Tu-116
- Tupolev Tu-104
- Tupolev Tu-114
- Tupolev Tu-124
- Tupolev Tu-126
- Tupolev Tu-134
- Tupolev Tu-144
- Tupolev Tu-154

== Literature ==
- "S. P. Korolev. Encyclopedia of life and creativity" - edited by C. A. Lopota, RSC Energia. S. P. Korolev, 2014 ISBN 978-5-906674-04-3
