= Jeju Aerospace Museum =

Aviation museum in Seogwipo, South Korea

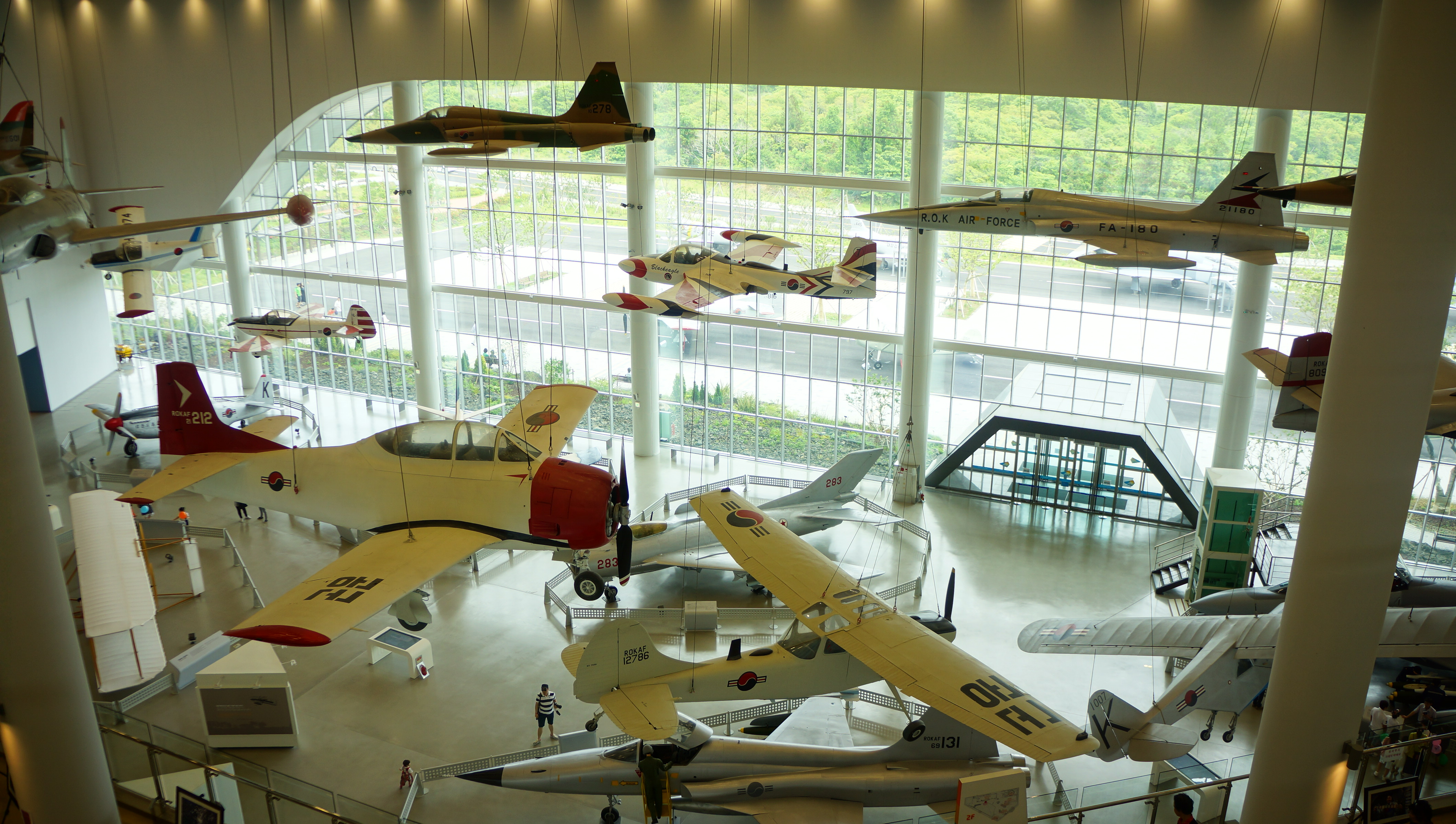
- Aviation Hall at the Jeju Aerospace Museum

- Location within South Korea
- Established: 2014
- Location: Seogwipo, Jeju Province, South Korea
- Coordinates: 33.304°N 126.299°E
- Type: Aviation museum
- Website: www.jdc-jam.com

The Jeju Aerospace Museum (Korean: 제주항공우주박물관) is an aerospace museum in Seogwipo, Jeju Province, South Korea.

The museum opened in April 2014 and cost 115 billion won (then US$106.7 million) to build. It comprises two indoor and one outdoor display areas.

== Aircraft on display ==
=== Indoor display ===
- Wright Flyer replica
- Bulwaho
- Murphy Renegade
- Pazmany PL-2
- Mudry CAP 10B
- Lockheed T-33A Shooting Star
- Cessna T-37C Tweet
- Cessna T-41 Mescalero
- BAE T-59 Hawk
- Zenith STOL CH 701
- Cessna O-1G Bird Dog
- McDonnell Douglas F-4D Phantom II
- Mikoyan-Gurevich MiG-19
- North American T-6 Mosquito
- North American F-51D Mustang
- North American T-28A Trojan
- North American F-86F Sabre
- Northrop F-5A
- Northrop F-5E

=== Outdoor display ===
- Bell UH-1B
- Cessna A-37 Dragonfly
- Douglas C-54 Skymaster
- Fairchild C-123K Provider 55–4509
- McDonnell Douglas F-4D Phantom II
- McDonnell Douglas F-4E Phantom II
- McDonnell Douglas RF-4C Phantom II
- North American T-28A Trojan
- North American F-86D Sabre
- Republic RC-3 Seabee
