= North American T-28 Trojan =

Family of military training aircraft

T-28 Trojan
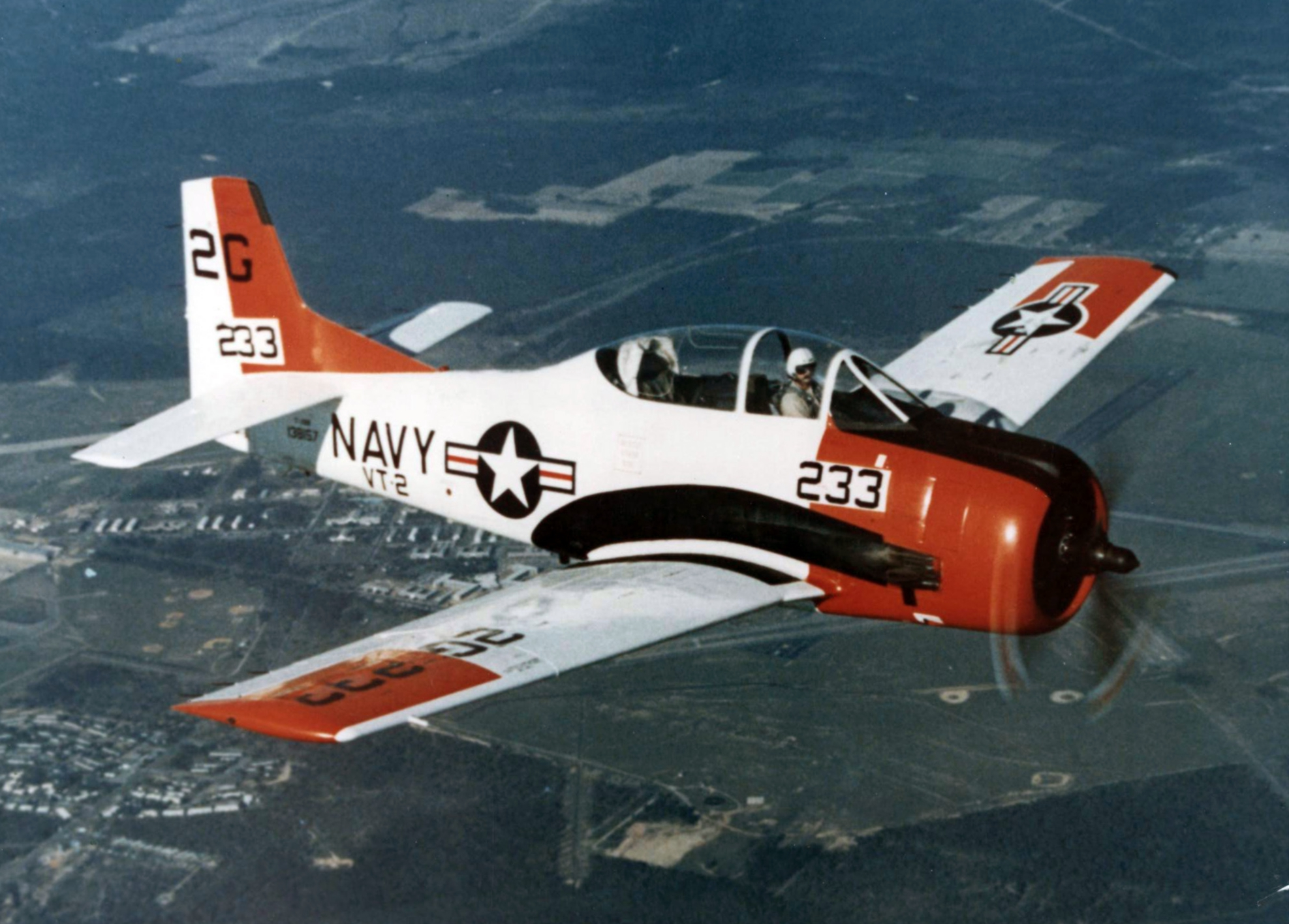
- A US Navy T-28B in 1973

General information
- Type: Trainer aircraft Light attack
- Manufacturer: North American Aviation
- Primary users: United States Air Force United States Navy; Republic of Vietnam Air Force; French Air Force
- Number built: 1,948

History
- Manufactured: 1950–1957
- First flight: 24 September 1949
- Retired: 1994 Philippine Air Force
- Developed from: North American XSN2J
- Developed into: AIDC T-CH-1

The North American Aviation T-28 Trojan is a radial-engined military trainer aircraft manufactured by North American Aviation and used by the United States Air Force and United States Navy beginning in the 1950s. Besides its use as a trainer, the T-28 was successfully employed as a counter-insurgency aircraft, primarily during the Vietnam War. It has continued in civilian use as an aerobatics and warbird performer.

== Design and development ==
On 24 September 1949, the XT-28 (company designation NA-159) was flown for the first time, designed to replace the T-6 Texan. The T-28A arrived at the Air Proving Ground, Eglin Air Force Base, Florida, in mid-June 1950, for suitability tests as an advanced trainer by the 3200th Fighter Test Squadron, with consideration given to its transition, instrument, and gunnery capabilities. Found satisfactory, a contract was issued and between 1950 and 1957, in total 1,948 were built.

Following the T-28's withdrawal from U.S. military service, a number were remanufactured by Hamilton Aircraft into two versions called the Nomair. The first refurbished machines, designated T-28R-1 were similar to the standard T-28s from which they were adapted, and were supplied to the Brazilian Navy. Later, a more ambitious conversion was undertaken as the T-28R-2, which transformed the two-seat tandem aircraft into a five-seat cabin monoplane for general aviation use. Other civilian conversions of ex-military T-28As were undertaken by PacAero as the Nomad Mark I and Nomad Mark II

== Operational history ==
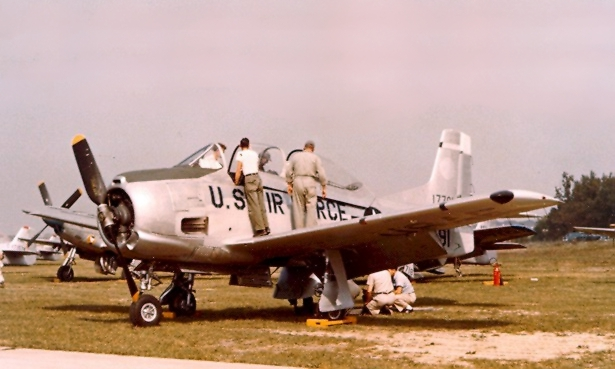
West Virginia Air National Guard T-28A in 1957

After becoming adopted as a primary trainer by the U.S. Air Force (USAF), the U.S Navy (USN) and U.S. Marine Corps (USMC) adopted it, as well. Although the USAF phased out the aircraft from primary pilot training by the early 1960s, continuing use only for limited training of special-operations aircrews and for primary training of select foreign military personnel, the aircraft continued to be used as a primary trainer by the USN (and by default, the USMC and U.S. Coast Guard) well into the early 1980s.

The largest single concentration of this aircraft was employed by the USN at Naval Air Station Whiting Field in Milton, Florida, in the training of student naval aviators. The T-28's service career in the U.S. military ended with the completion of the phase-in of the T-34C turboprop trainer. The last USN training squadron to fly the T-28 was VT-27 "Boomers", based at Naval Air Station Corpus Christi, Texas, flying the last T-28 training flight in early 1984. The last T-28 in the Training Command, BuNo 137796, departed for Naval District Washington on 14 March 1984, to be displayed permanently at Naval Support Facility Anacostia, DC.

=== Vietnam War combat ===
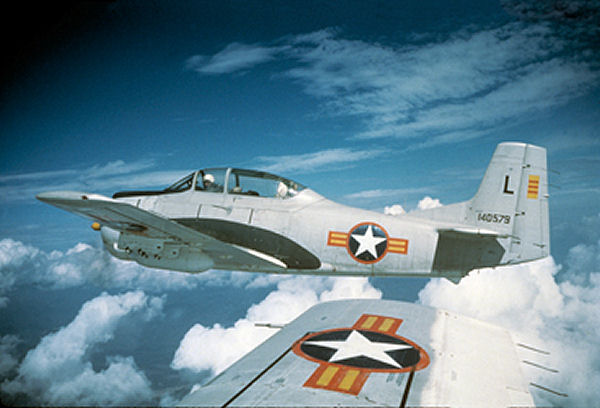
RVNAF T-28Cs over Vietnam

In 1963, a Royal Lao Air Force T-28 piloted by Lieutenant Chert Saibory, a Thai national, defected to North Vietnam. Saibory was immediately imprisoned and his aircraft was impounded. Within six months, the T-28 was refurbished and commissioned into the North Vietnamese Air Force (NVAF) as its first fighter aircraft. Lt. Saibory later trained NVAF pilot Nguyen Van Ba in the operation of the T-28, where Nguyen flew the T-28 in its first successful interception against a Republic of Vietnam Air Force (RVNAF) C-123 Provider on 15 February 1964, earning the NVAF its first aerial victory. The NVAF unit that operated the T-28 in the respective military operation has later evolved into the modern Vietnam Airlines.

T-28s were supplied to the RVNAF in support of ARVN ground operations, seeing extensive service during the Vietnam War in RVNAF hands, as well as the Secret War in Laos. A T-28 Trojan was the first US fixed-wing attack aircraft (nontransport type) lost in South Vietnam, during the Vietnam War. Capt. Robert L. Simpson, USAF, Detachment 2A, 1st Air Commando Group, and Lt. Hoa, RVNAF, were shot down by ground fire on 28 August 1962, while flying close air support. Neither crewman survived. The USAF lost 23 T-28s to all causes during the war, with the last two losses occurring in 1968.

=== Other combat uses ===
T-28s were used by the CIA in the former Belgian Congo during the 1960s.

The T-28B and D were the primary ground-attack aircraft of Khmer Air Force in Cambodia during the war there, largely provided from the U.S. Military Equipment Delivery Team and maintained by Air America. On the night of 21 January 1971, PAVN sappers managed to get close enough to destroy the majority at Pochentong Airbase. Replacements were quickly shipped in. On 17 March 1973, a pilot of a T-28, said to be Capt. So Petra, a common-law husband of one of the daughters of the overthrown Prince Norodom Sihanouk, machine gunned and bombed the palace of Lon Nol in an attempt to assassinate him, killing at least 20 and wounding 35, before defecting to Khmer Rouge-held lands.

France's Armée de l'Air used locally remanufactured Trojans, T-28S Fennec, for close-air support missions in Algeria.

Nicaragua replaced its fleet of more than 30 former Swedish P-51s with T-28s in the early 1960s, with more aircraft acquired in the 1970s and '80s.

The Philippines used T-28s (colloquially known as "Tora-toras") during the 1989 Philippine coup attempt. The aircraft were often deployed as dive bombers by rebel forces.

=== Civilian use ===
AeroVironment modified and armored a T-28A to fly weather research for South Dakota School of Mines & Technology (SDSM&T), funded by the National Science Foundation, and operated in this capacity from 1969 to 2005. SDSM&T was planning to replace it with another modified, but more modern, former military aircraft, specifically a Fairchild Republic A-10 Thunderbolt II. This plan was found to carry too many risks associated with the costly modifications required, and the program was cancelled in 2018.

MicroProse purchased a T-28B in 1988 for use in marketing their flight-simulator video games, and named it Miss MicroProse. USAF reserve pilot Bill Stealey would fly with game journalists for this purpose, and ran a competition called "I Cheated Death with Major Bill", which selected three fans to fly with him on a "stunt-filled flight lesson". The plane was later sold to a flight school in Cincinnati.

=== Aerobatics and warbird display ===
Many retired T-28s were subsequently sold to private civilian operators, and due to their reasonable operating costs, they are often found flying or displayed as warbirds today.

== Variants ==
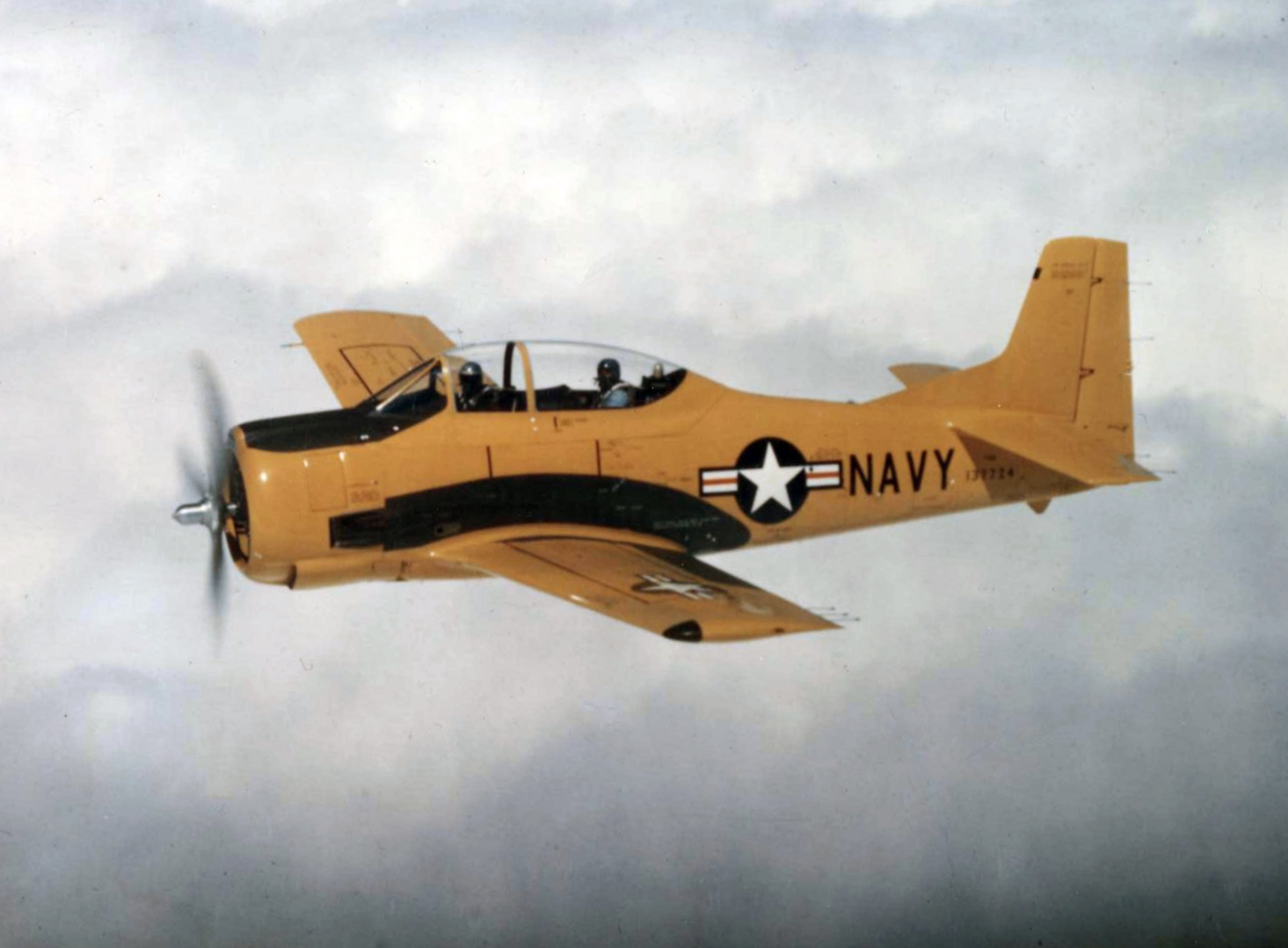
An early-production USN T-28B in 1954

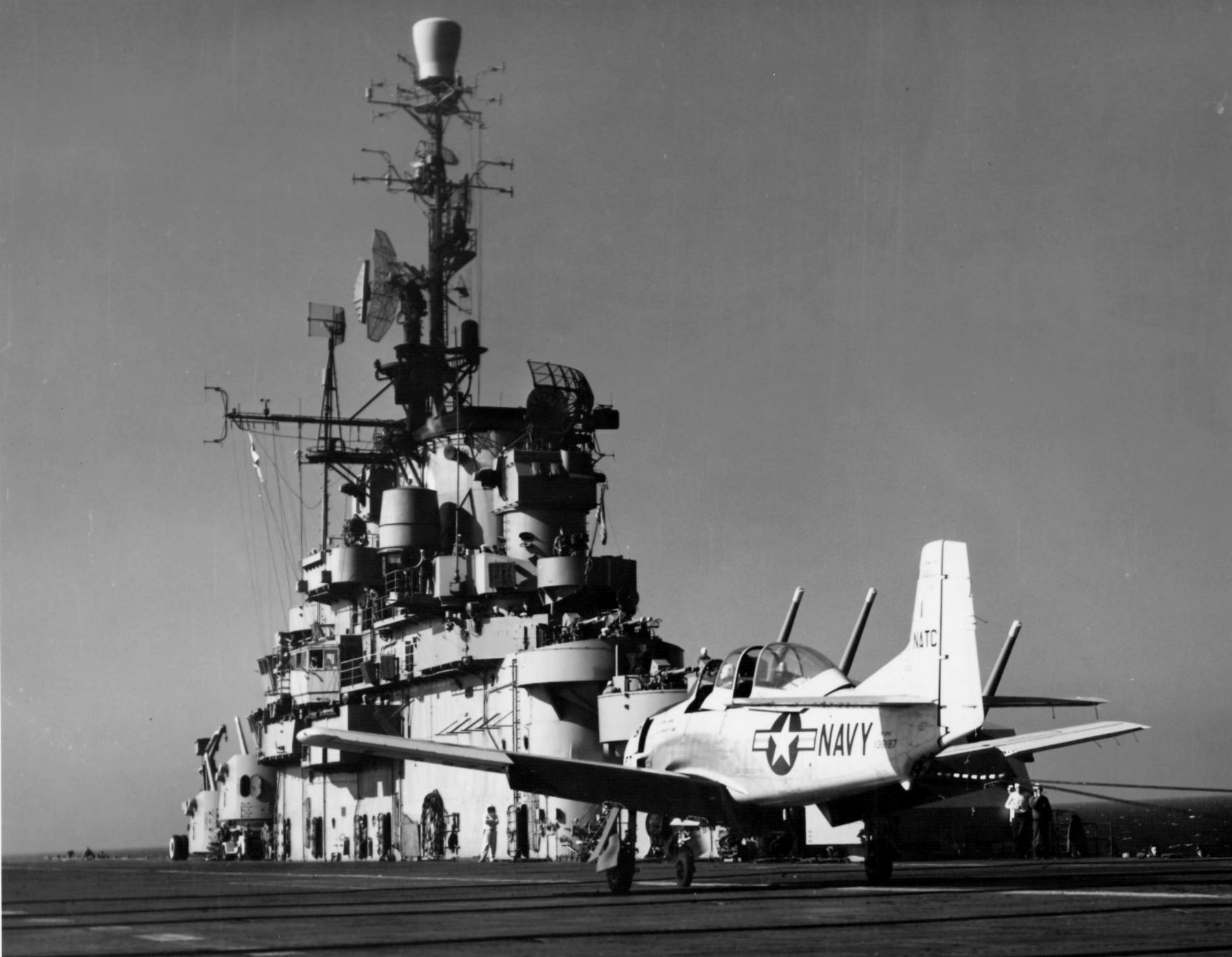
A tailhook-equipped T-28C after trapping, aboard USS Tarawa (CVA-40), in 1955

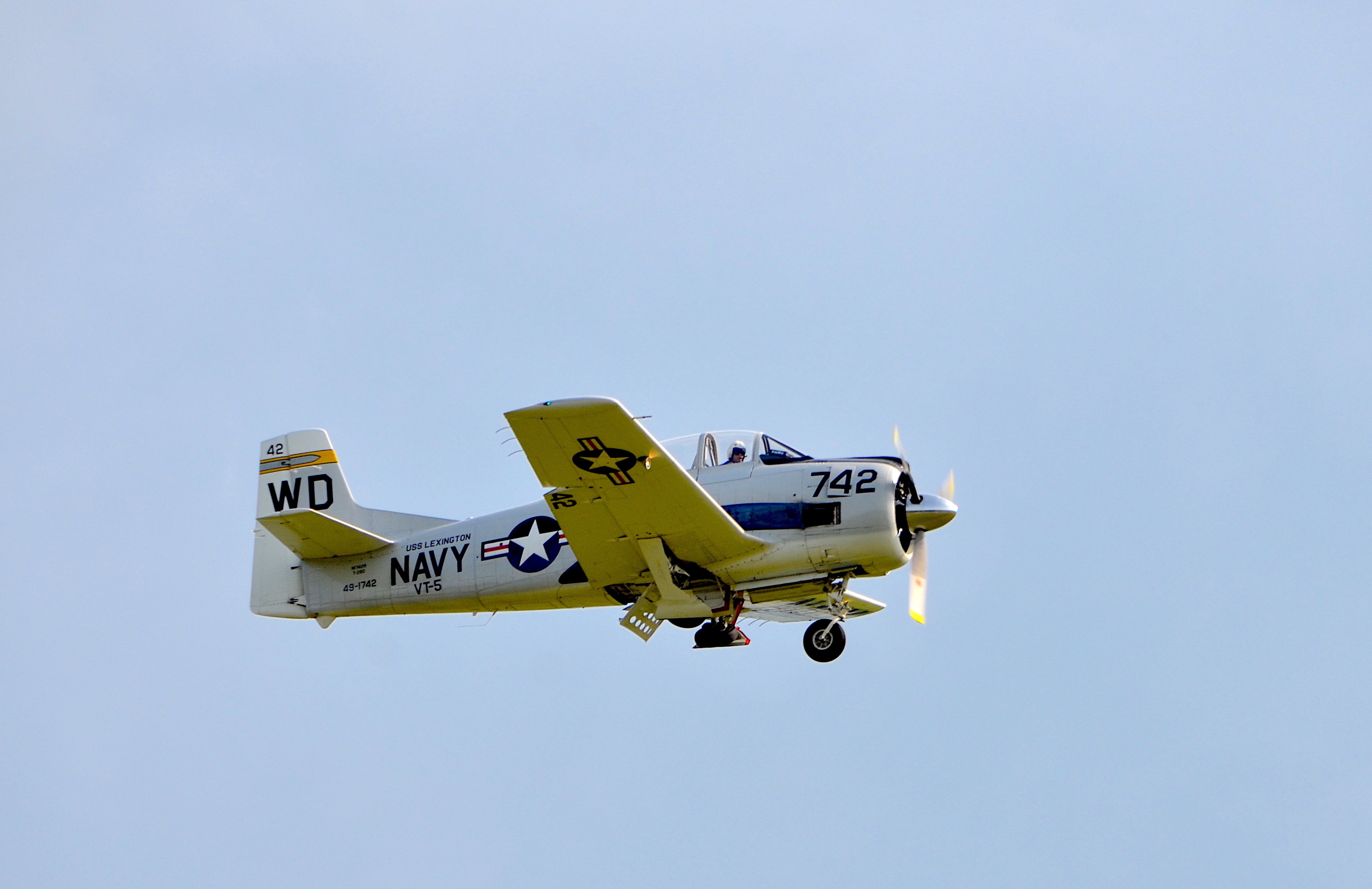
T-28D at Degerfeld airfield in 2017

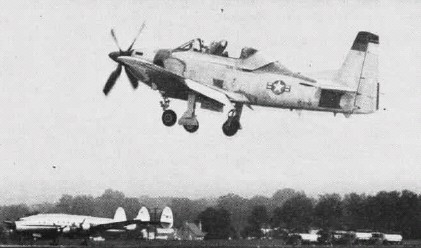
A turboprop-powered YAT-28E in 1964

XT-28
Prototype; two built

T-28A
USAF version with an 800 hp (597 kW) Wright R-1300-1 radial engine driving a two-bladed propeller; 1,194 built

T-28B
USN land-based trainer version with 1,425 hp (1,063 kW) Wright R-1820-86 radial engine driving a three-bladed propeller and fitted with a belly-mounted speed brake; 489 built from new and 17 converted from T-28

T-28C
USN version, a T-28B with shortened propeller blades and tailhook for carrier-landing training; 299 built

T-28D Nomad
T-28Bs were converted for the USAF in 1962 for the counterinsurgency, reconnaissance, search and rescue, and forward air controller roles in Vietnam; they were fitted with two underwing hardpoints. The later T-28D-5 had ammunition pans inside the wings that could be hooked up to hardpoint-mounted gun pods for a better center of gravity and aerodynamics; 321 were converted by Pacific Airmotive (Pac-Aero).

T-28 Nomad Mark I - Wright R-1820-56S engine (1,300 hp (969 kW)).
T-28 Nomad Mark II - Wright R-1820-76A (1,425 hp (1,063 kW))
T-28 Nomad Mark III - Wright R-1820-80 (1,535 hp (1,145 kW))

Fairchild AT-28D
An attack model of the T-28D, it was used for close air support missions by the USAF and allied air forces in Southeast Asia, which were nicknamed "Tangos" by their pilots. It was fitted with six underwing hardpoints and the rocket-powered Stanley Yankee ejection seat; 72 were converted by Fairchild Hiller.

YAT-28E
An experimental development of the counterinsurgency T-28D, it was powered by a 2,445 hp (1,823 kW) Lycoming YT-55L-9 turboprop and armed with two 12.7 mm (0.50 in) machine guns and up to 6,000 lb (2,700 kg) of weapons on 12 underwing hardpoints. Three prototypes were converted from T-28As by North American, with the first model flying on 15 February 1963. The project was canceled in 1965.

T-28S Fennec
Former USAF T-28As were converted in 1959 for use by the French Armée de l'Air, replacing the Morane-Saulnier MS.733A. They were flown by the Escadrilles d'Aviation Légère d'Appui (Light Aviation Support Squadrons) in the counterinsurgency role in North Africa from 1959 to 1962. They were fitted with an electrically powered sliding canopy, side armor, a 1,200 hp (895 kW) Wright R-1820-97 supercharged radial engine (the model used in the B-17 bomber), and four underwing hardpoints. The version is referred to as the "S" variant because the engine had a supercharger on it; it has also been referred to as the T-28F variant – with the "F" standing for France.

For fire-support missions, it usually carried two double-mounted 12.7 mm (0.50 in) machine gun pods (with 100 rounds per gun) and two MATRA Type 122 6 x 68 mm (2.7 in) rocket pods. It could also carry, on paired hardpoints, a 120 kg (260 lb) high explosive or GP "iron" bomb, a MATRA Type 361 36 x 37 mm (1.5 in) rocket pod, an SNEB 7 x 55 mm (2.2 in) rocket pod, or a MATRA Type 13 single-rail, MATRA Type 20 or Type 21 double-rail, MATRA Type 41 quadruple-rail (2 x 2), or MATRA Type 61 or 63 sextuple-rail (3 x 3) SERAM T10 heavy rocket launchers. Improvised napalm bombs (called bidons spéciaux, or "special cans") were created by dropping gas tanks loaded with octagel-thickened fuel inside, then later igniting or detonating the spilled fuel with white phosphorus rockets.
In total, 148 airframes bought from Pacific Airmotive (Pac Aero) and modified by Sud-Aviation in France. After the war, the French government offered them for sale from 1964 to 1967. Most were sold to Morocco and Argentina. The Fuerza Aérea de Nicaragua (FAN) purchased four of these ex-Morocco aircraft during 1979. Argentina later sold some to Uruguay and Honduras.

T-28P
T-28S Fennec aircraft were sold to the Argentinian Navy as carrier-borne attack aircraft. They were given shortened propeller blades and a tailhook to allow carrier landings.

T-28R Nomair
An attempt by Hamilton Aircraft Company of Tucson, Arizona to make a civilianized Nomad III-equivalent out of refurbished ex-USAF T-28As, it had a Wright Cyclone R-1820-80 engine to make it fast and powerful, but had to lengthen the wingspan by seven feet to reduce the stall speed to below a "street-legal" 70 knots. The prototype flew for the first time in September 1960, and the FAA type certificate was received on 15 February 1962. At the time, the T-28-R2 was the fastest single-engined, standard-category aircraft available in the United States. It had been flown to an altitude of 38,700 ft (11,800 m).

T-28R-1 Nomair I
A military trainer, it had a tandem cockpit, dual instrumentation and flying controls, and a hydraulically actuated, rearward-sliding canopy. Six were sold in 1962 as carrier-landing trainers to the Brazilian Navy and were modified with a carrier arrestor hook. They were later transferred to the Brazilian Air Force.

T-28R-2 Nomair II
This version was modified to have a cramped, five-seater cabin (one pilot and two rows of two passengers) that opened from the port side. Ten aircraft were modified in all; one was sold to a high-altitude photographic company.

RT-28
A photoreconnaissance conversion, it was used for counterinsurgency with the Royal Lao Air Force. The number of conversions is unknown.

AIDC T-CH-1
A derivative of the T-28 developed by AIDC in Taiwan, the AIDC T-CH-1 was powered by a 1,082 kW (1,451 hp) Avco Lycoming T53-L-701 turboprop engine; 50 aircraft were produced for the Taiwanese Air Force between March 1976 and 1981. The type has since been retired.

B.F.13
(Thai: บ.ฝ.๑๓) Royal Thai Armed Forces designation for the T-28D

B.JF.13
(Thai: บ.จฝ.๑๓) Royal Thai Armed Forces designation for the AT-28D

== Operators ==
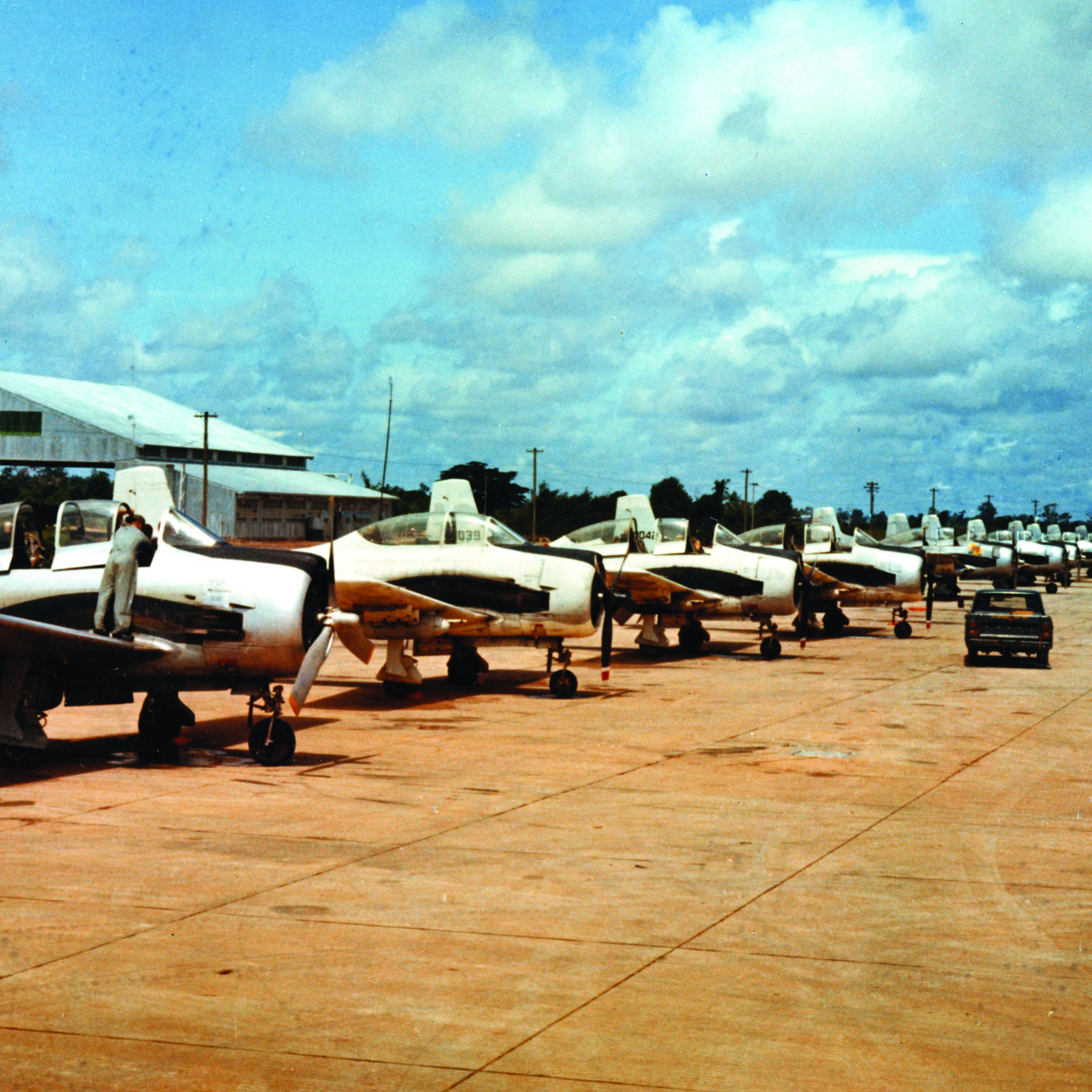
T-28Ds used in Operation Barrel Roll in Laos

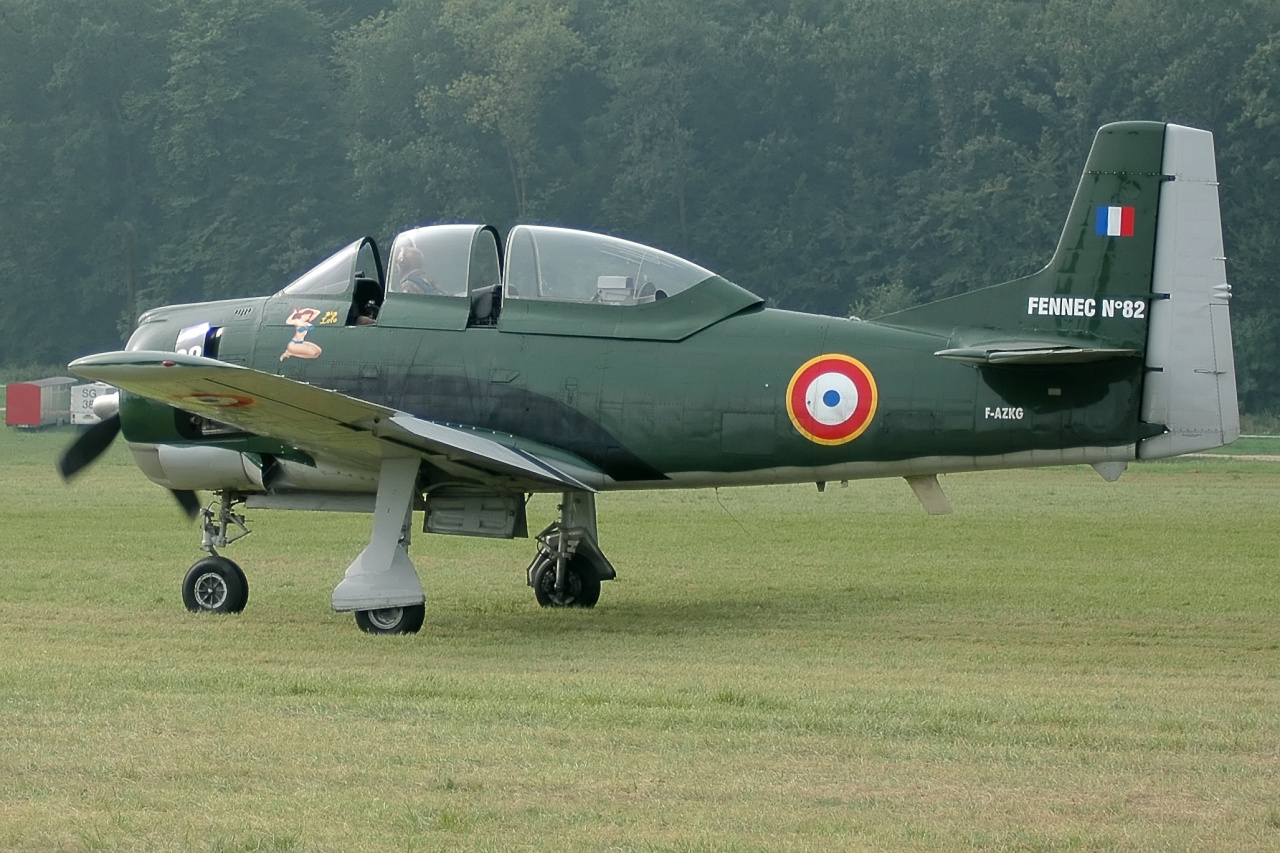
A former French T-28 Fennec

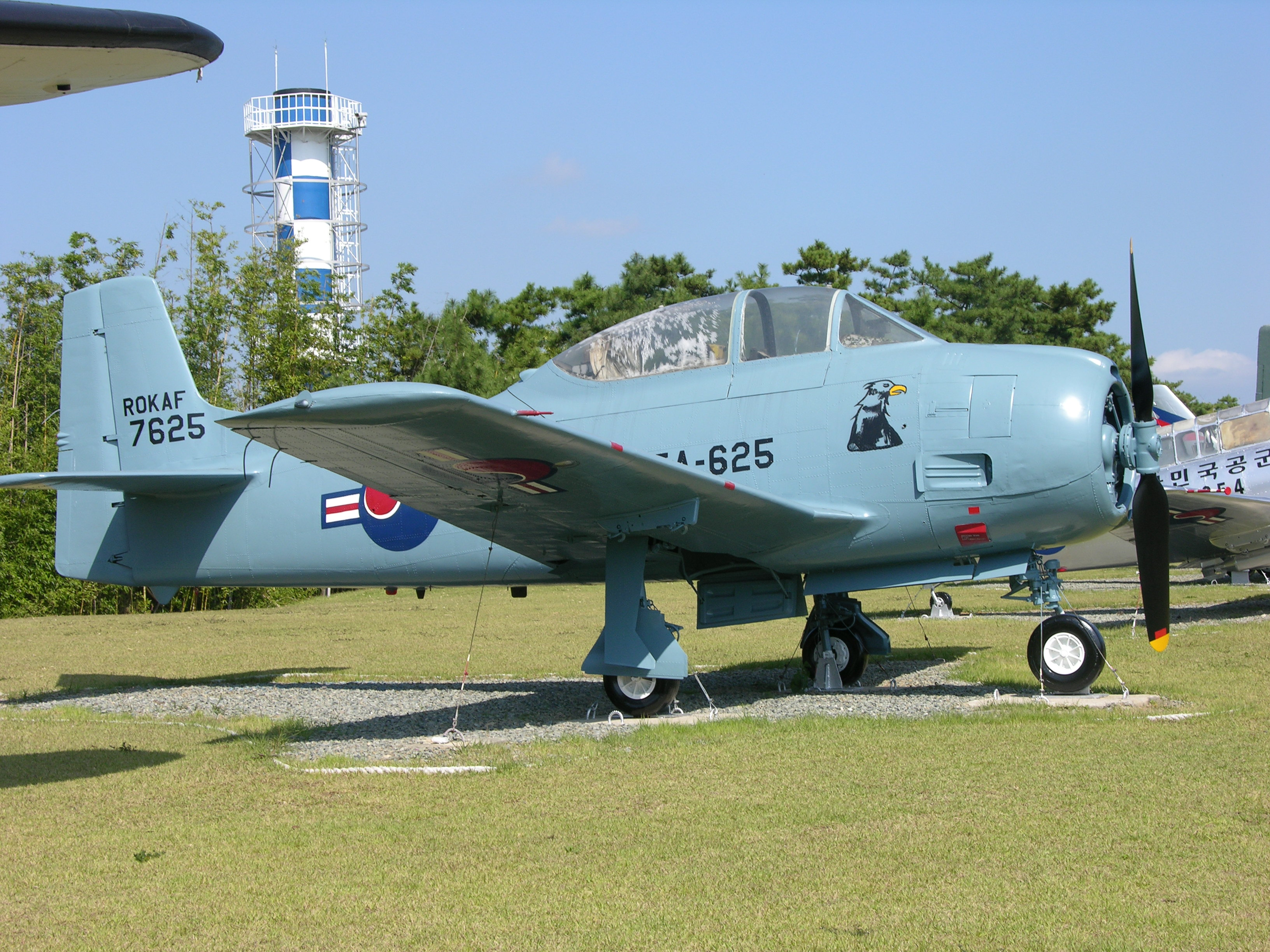
RoKAF T-28A

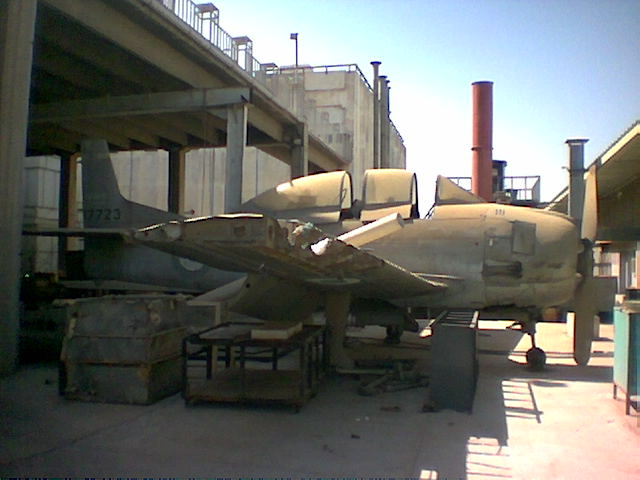
Derelict Royal Saudi Air Force T-28A at King Abdulaziz University, Jeddah, one of four acquired in the 1950s

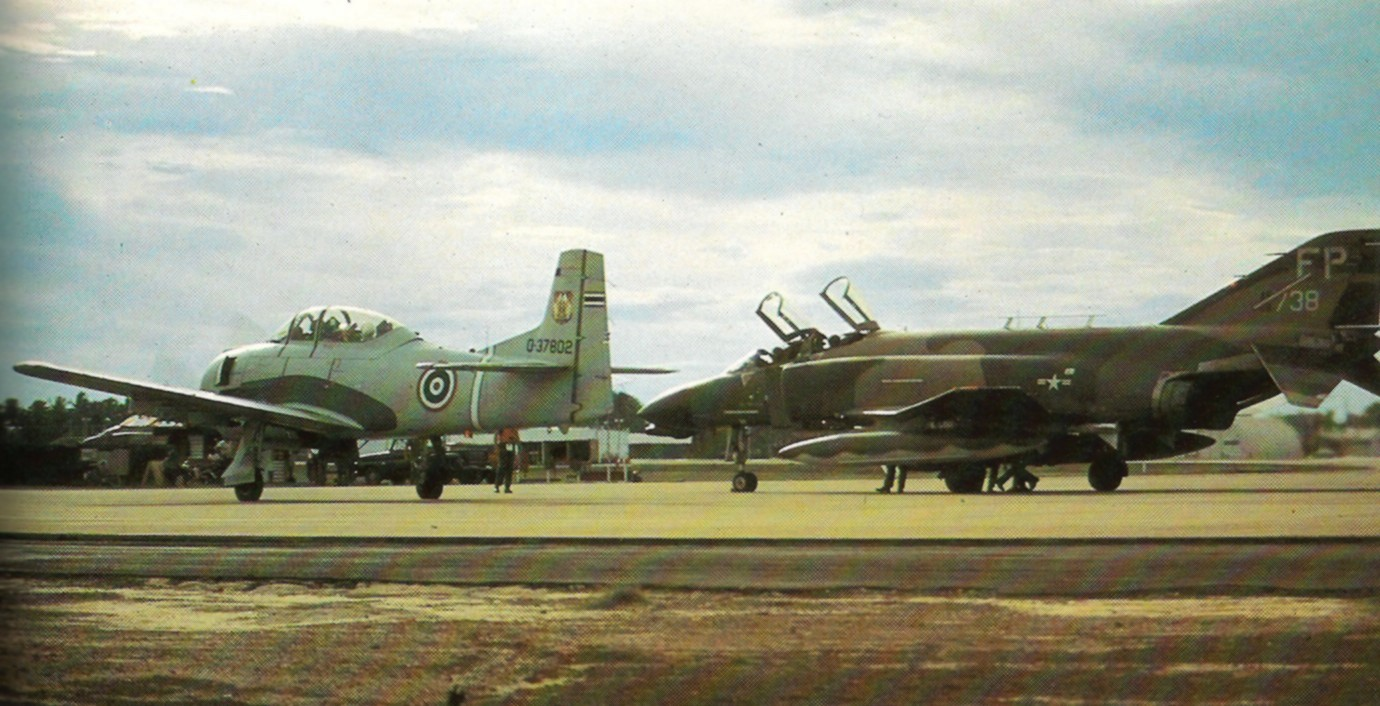
Royal Thai Air Force T-28D is waiting for takeoff.

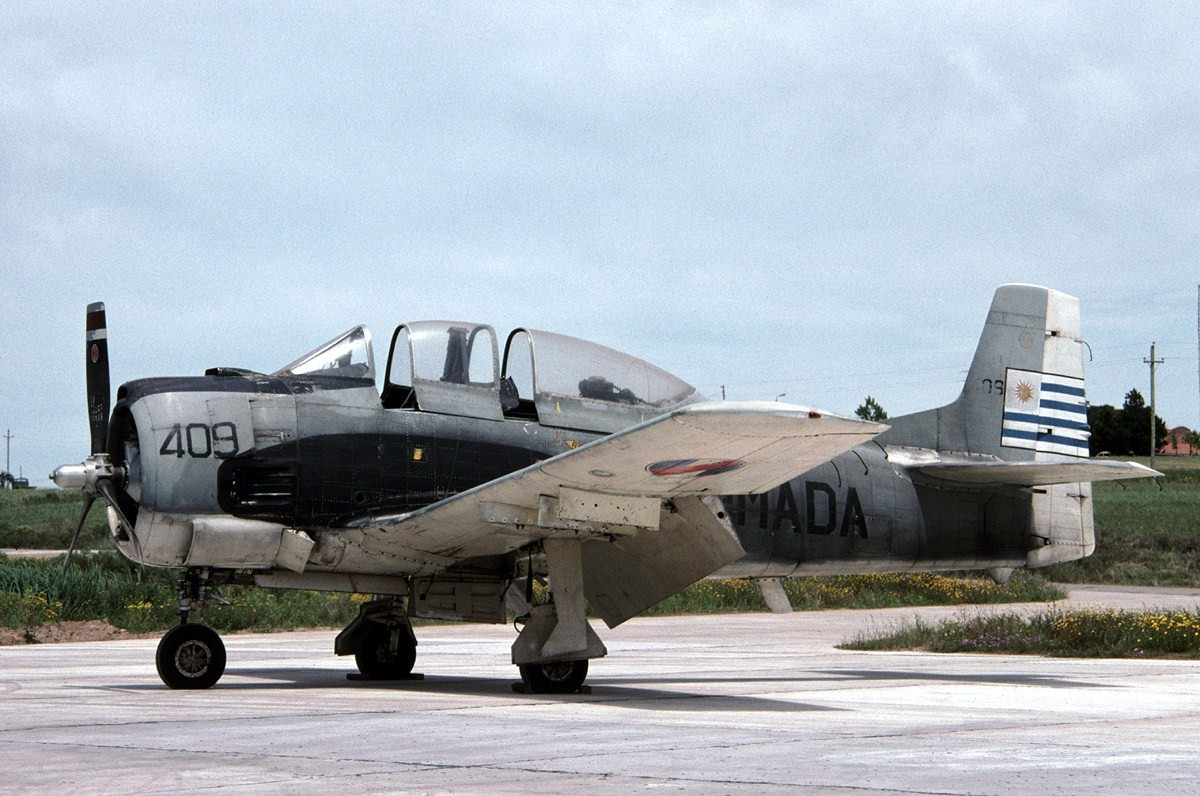
Uruguay Naval Aviation T-28S Fennec

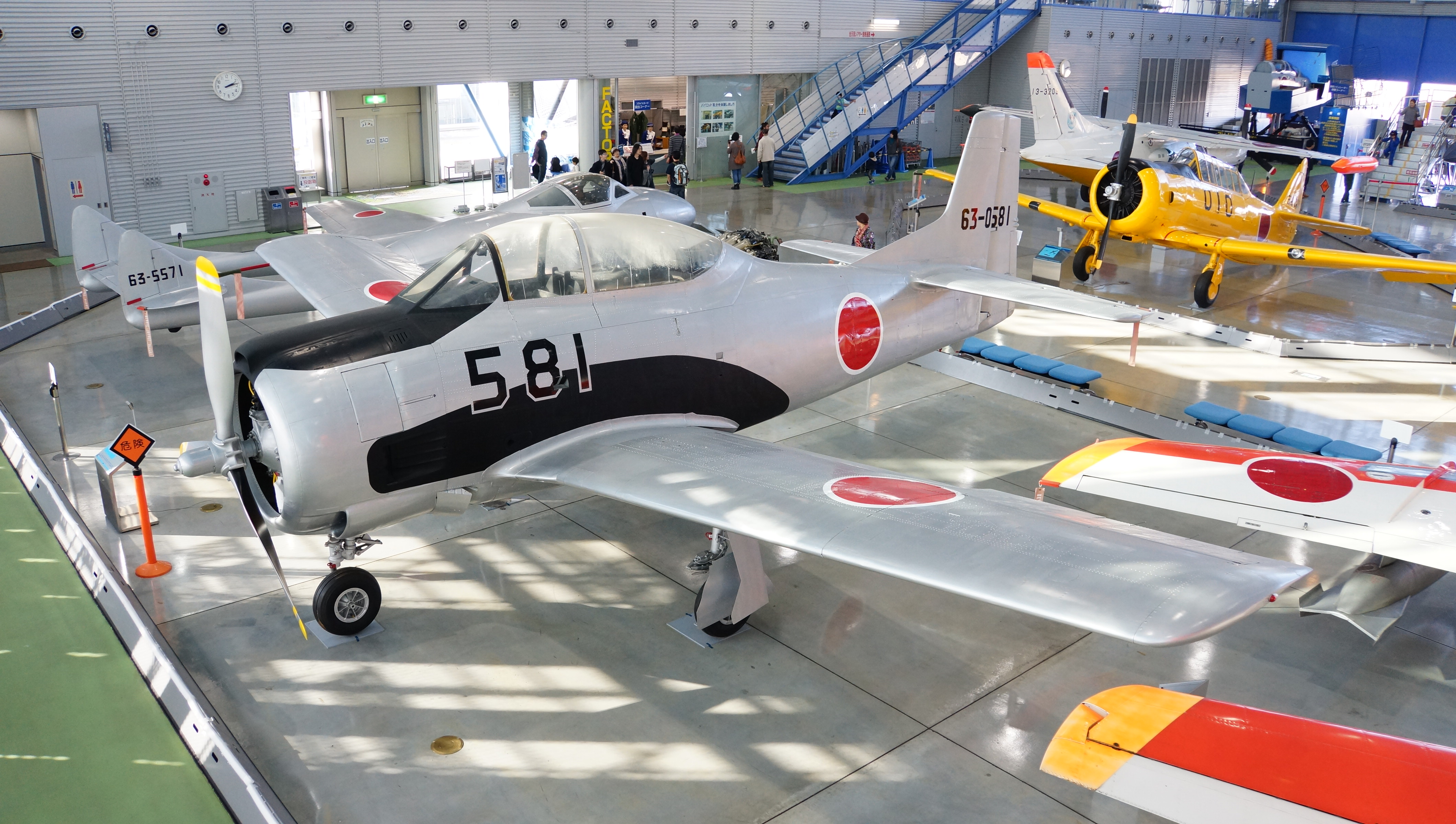
Japan Air Self-Defense Force T-28B

Argentina

- Argentine Air Force - 34 T-28A
- Argentine Naval Aviation. 65 ex-French Air Force T-28S Fennec aircraft. Last nine transferred to Uruguayan naval aviation in 1980.

Bolivia

- Bolivian Air Force at least six T-28Ds.

Brazil

- Brazilian Navy - 18 T-28C

Democratic Republic of the Congo

- Air Force of the Democratic Republic of the Congo - 14 T-28C, 3 T-28B, 10 T-28D

Cuba

- Cuban Air Force - 10 T-28As were ordered by the Batista regime but were never delivered owing to an arms embargo, although at least one T-28 seems to have been acquired at some stage which was put on display at a museum at Playa Girón

Dominican Republic

- Dominican Air Force

Ecuador

- Ecuadorian Air Force - nine T-28A

Ethiopia

- Ethiopian Air Force - 12 T-28A and 12 T-28D

France

- French Air Force - 148 T-28A airframes modified in France (1959) to make the T-28S Fennec COIN model.

Haiti

- Haitian Air Force - 12 ex-French Air Force

Honduras

- Honduran Air Force - eight former Moroccan Air Force Fennecs. One delivered, seven others impounded at Fort Lauderdale

Japan

- Japanese Air Self-Defense Force - one T-28B

Khmer Republic

- Khmer Air Force operated 47 T-28s in total in service.

Laos

- Royal Lao Air Force - 55 T-28D

Mexico

- Mexican Air Force - 32 T-28A

Morocco

- Royal Moroccan Air Force - 25 Fennec aircraft

Nicaragua

- Nicaraguan Air Force - six T-28D

Philippines

- Philippine Air Force - 12 units T-28A, 32 units T-28D

South Korea

- Republic of Korea Air Force

Saudi Arabia

- Royal Saudi Air Force

South Vietnam

- Republic of Vietnam Air Force

Tunisia

- Tunisian Air Force - Fennec

Taiwan

- ROC Air Force

Thailand

- Royal Thai Air Force - 88 T-28Ds delivered. Retired 1984.

United States

- United States Army
- United States Air Force - 1194 T-28A, of which 360 converted to "D"
- United States Navy - 489 T-28B and 299 T-28C

Uruguay

- Uruguayan Naval Aviation - Fennec

Vietnam

- Vietnam People's Air Force - 919th Regiment

Zaire

- Zaire Air Force

== Surviving aircraft ==
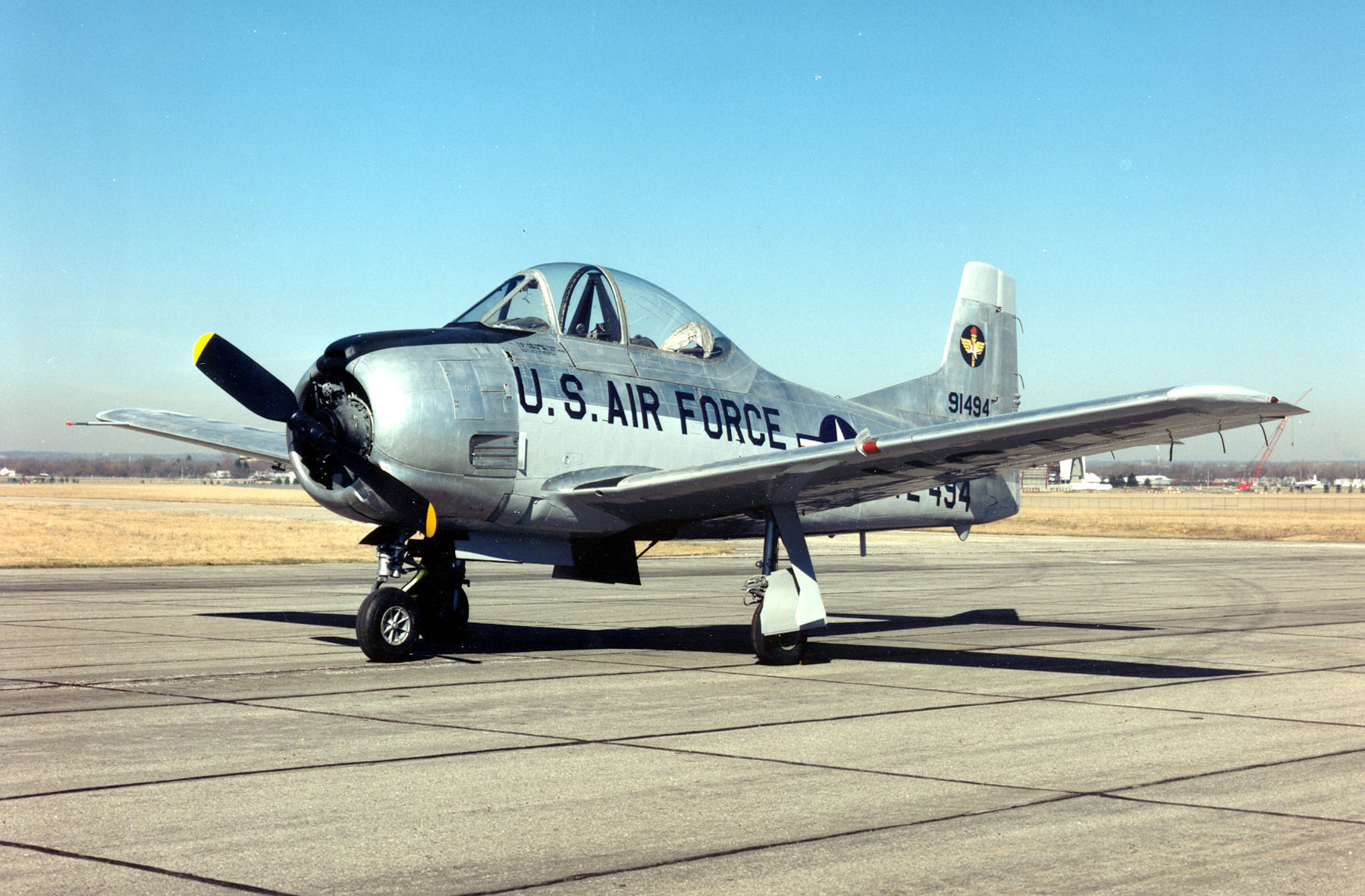
A T-28A of the USAF Museum

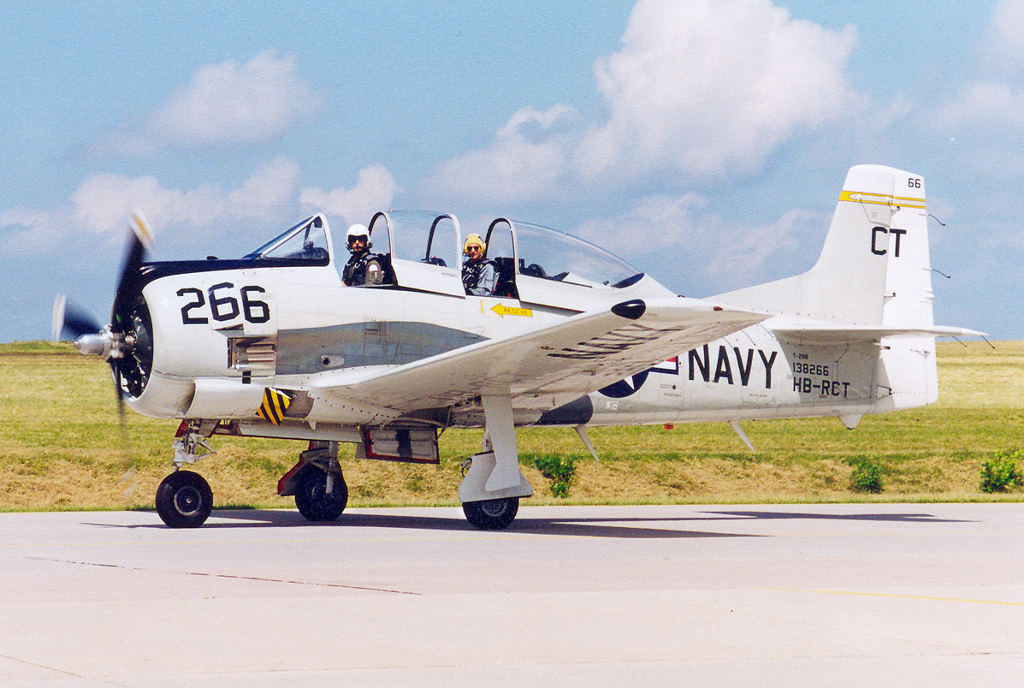
T-28B BuNo 138266 in 2008

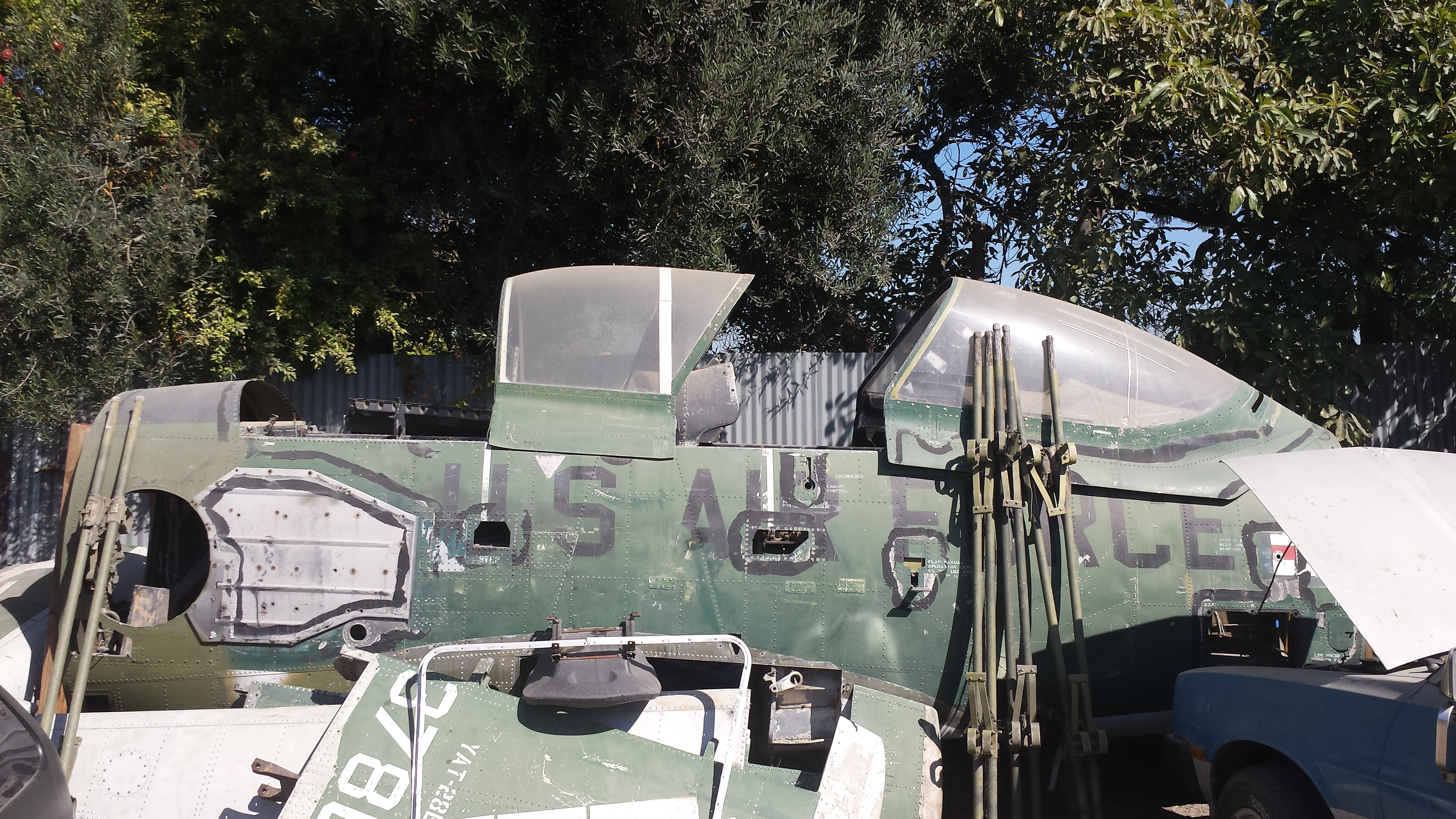
YAT-28E 0-13786

Many T-28s are on display throughout the world. In addition, a considerable number of flyable examples exist in private ownership, as the aircraft is a popular sport plane and warbird.

=== Argentina ===
On display

T-28A

- S/N 174112 (ex-USAF 51-3574), formerly operated by the Argentine Air Force as E-608. Preserved at the Museo Regional Inter Fuerzas, Estancia Santa Romana, San Luis.
- C/N° 174333 (ex-USAF 51-3795), formerly operated by the Argentine Naval Aviation. Preserved at the Argentine Naval Aviation Museum.
- Unknown T-28A (Registration 3-A-224). Preserved, although in very bad condition following a crash in 1970, at the Puerto San Julián Air Base in Puerto San Julián, Santa Cruz.

=== Australia ===
On display

- 50-221 "LITTL JUGGS". Toowoomba Australia

T-28A

- 49-1583 - Australian Aviation Museum, Bankstown Airport, New South Wales, Australia.

T-28B

- Bu 140016, Located at Jandakot Airport in Western Australia. Owned by AOG Services and registered as VH-KAN. Imported from the US in 2014 and formerly N46984.

=== Germany ===
Airworthy

T-28A

- 3684, civil registration N2800G - entered service in 1951 as 51-3684. Now in private ownership and flown in Baden-Württemberg at Bremgarten (EDTG).

T-28C

146246 and 140058 flown by the Bavarian Tailhooks at Friedrichshafen Airport during the Do-Days 2026

- Bavarian Tailhooks - is the name of the bavarian pilot duo Franz F. and Alex B.. They fly a pair of T-28C at Munich Airport (EDDM). The tail markings FF and AB are the initials of the pilots with 1026 being the years of the airframes' acquisitions respectively.
  - 146246, civil registration D-FUMY - entered service in 1957 and decommissioned in 1976. Since 2010 in ownership and flown by Franz F..
  - 140058, civil registration F-AYTZ - entered service in 1955. Sold to a private owner in France. Acquired by the Bavarian Tailhooks in mid 2026 and flown by Alex B. .

T-28D

- 49-1742 - constructed in 1951 as T-28A, and remanufactured as T-28D. Currently located in Baden-Württemberg at Degerfeld (EDSA). Owned by Guido Voss and registered as N1742R.

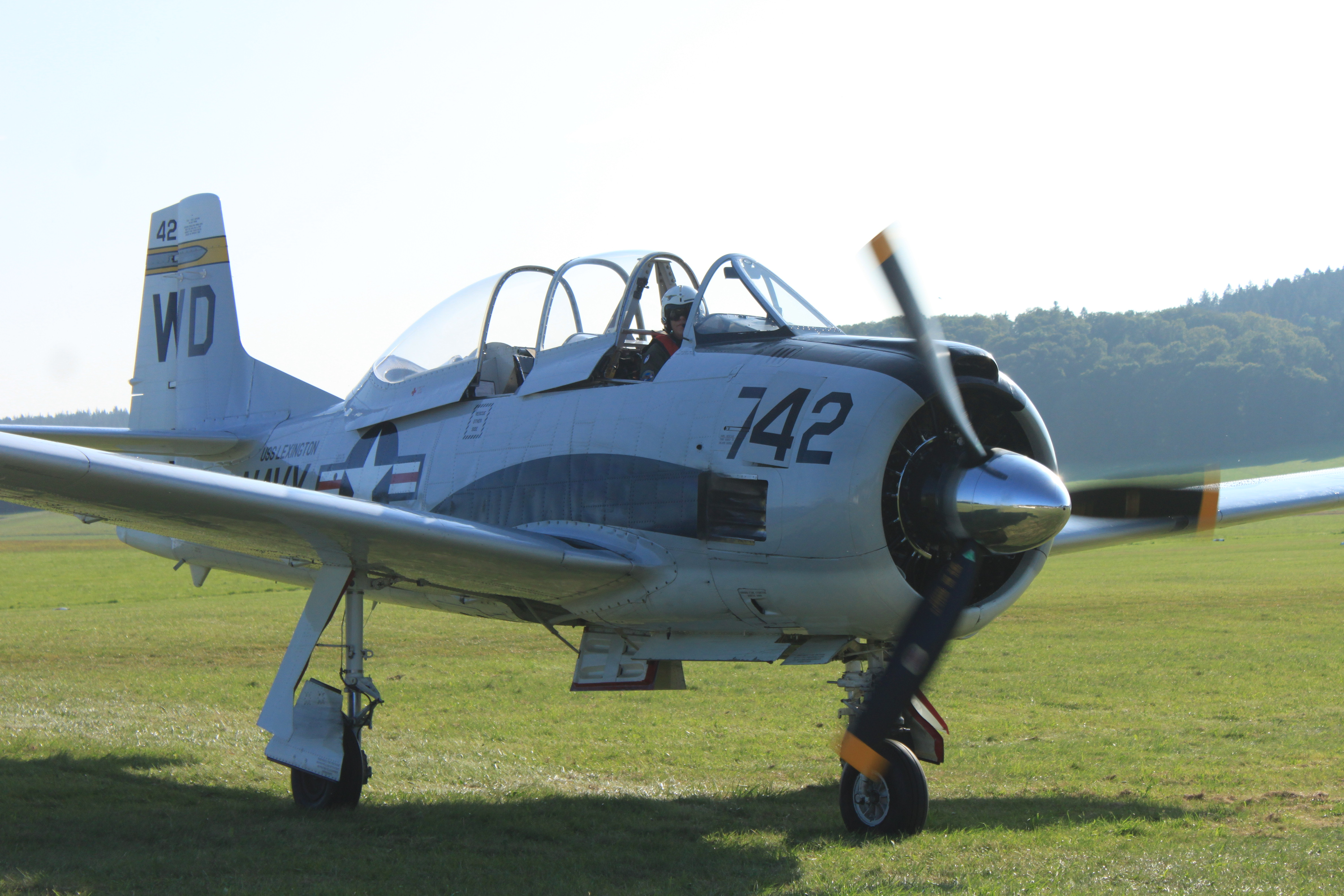
T-28D 49-1742, based in Bitz, in 2024

=== New Zealand ===
Airworthy

T-28B

- Bu.137801 - Imported into New Zealand from Australia in 2018. Civil registration ZK-TPV (formerly VH-DUD).
- Bu.138218 - Former United States Navy aircraft. Imported into New Zealand in 2015. Civil registration ZK-TGN. Modified to accommodate a Pratt & Whitney R2000 radial engine.

T-28C

- Bu.140563 - Former United States Navy aircraft. Imported into New Zealand in 1989. Civil registration ZK-JGS.

=== Philippines ===
T-28A

- 109 - Philippine Air Force Museum. Colonel Jesus Villamor Air Base Pasay, Metro Manila
- 7760 - Basilio Fernando Air Base. Lipa, Batangas
- 612 - Villa Escudero Plantations and Resort. Tiaong, Quezon

AT-28D

- 137701 - Major Danilo Atienza Air Base, Cavite City, Cavite, Philippines.
- 114645 - Clark Air Base, Angeles City, Pampanga Philippines
- 100310 - Edwin Andrews Air Base, Zamboanga City, Philippines.

=== South Korea ===
On display

T-28A

- Daejeon National Cemetery
- 51-7625 - KAI Aerospace Museum, Sacheon
- Korea Air Force Academy
- Jeju Aerospace Museum (2)
- War Memorial of Korea, Seoul

=== Taiwan ===
On display

T-28A

- 51-3664 - Chung Cheng Aviation Museum, Taipai Airport,.

=== Thailand ===
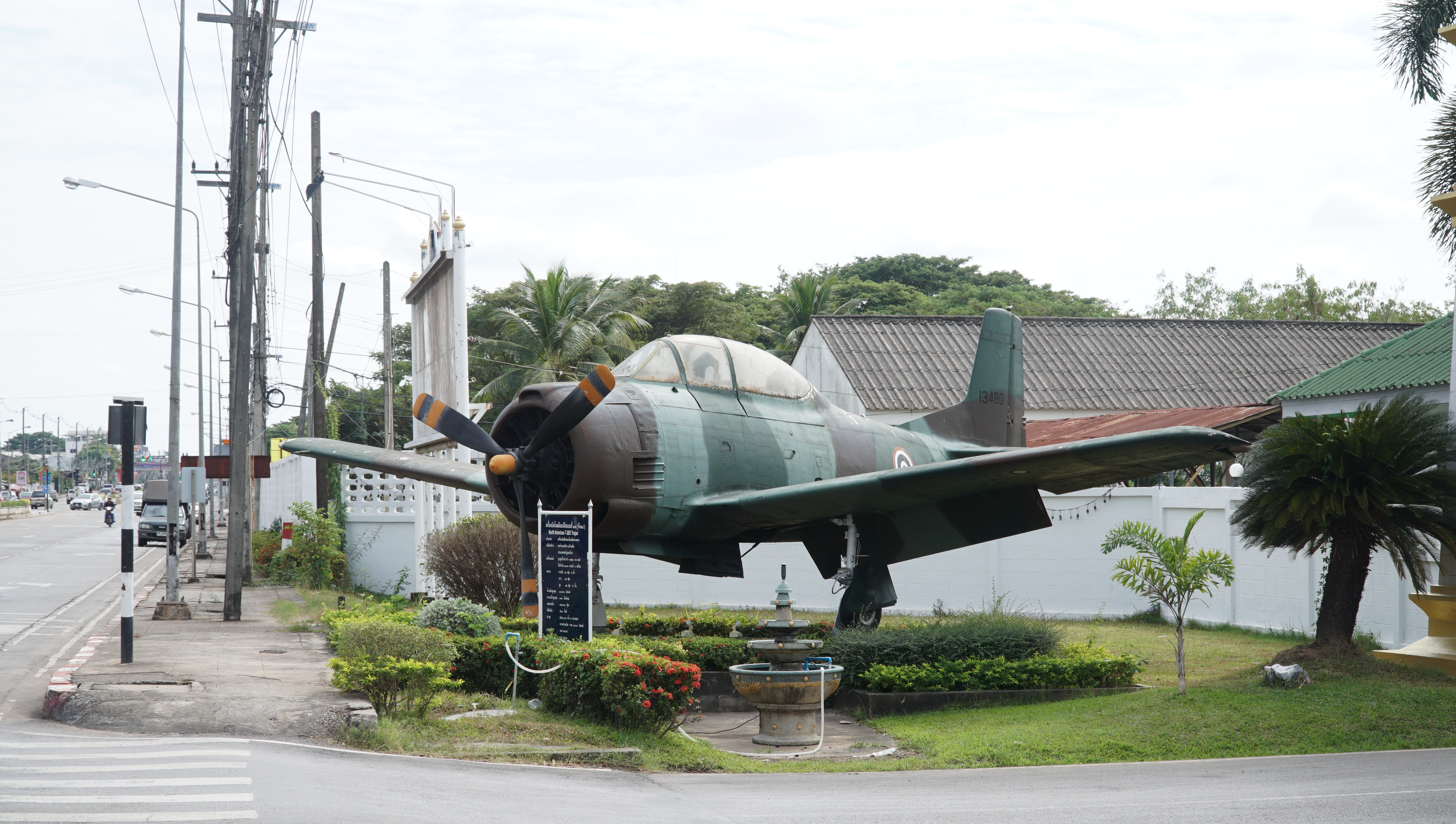
T-28 at the Udorn Royal Thai Air Force Base

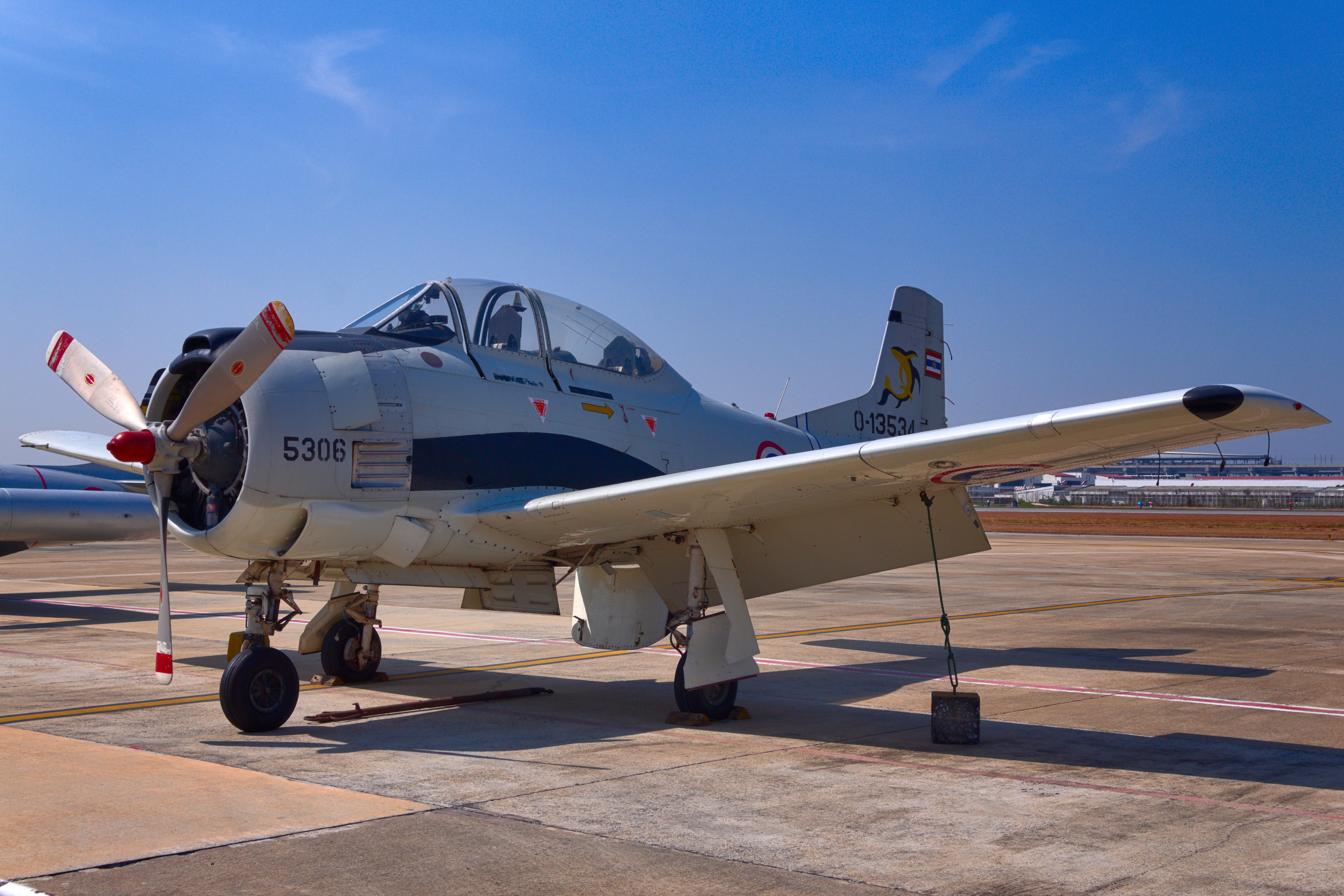
T-28 Trojan at the Don Muang Royal Thai Air Force Base

On display

T-28A

- 49-1538 - Prachuap Khiri Khan AFB in Bangkok, Thailand.
- 49-1601 - Don Muang Royal Thai Air Force Base, Bangkok, Thailand.
- 49-1687 - Loei Airport, Loei Province, Thailand.
- 51-3480 - Udorn Royal Thai Air Force Base, Thailand.
- 51-3578 - Chiang Mai AFB, Thailand.
- 51-3740 - Don Muang Royal Thai Air Force Base, Bangkok, Thailand.

T-28B

- 137661 - Royal Thai Air Force Museum, Bangkok, Thailand.
- 138157 - Royal Thai Air Force Museum, Bangkok, Thailand.
- 138284 - Royal Thai Air Force Museum, Bangkok, Thailand.
- 138302 - Lopburi AFB, Thailand.

T-28D

- 153652 - National Memorial, Bangkok, Thailand.

=== United Kingdom ===
On display

T-28C

- 146289 - Norfolk & Suffolk Aviation Museum, Flixton, The Saints, United Kingdom.

=== United States ===
On display

T-28A

- 49-1494 - National Museum of the United States Air Force at Wright-Patterson AFB in Dayton, Ohio. The aircraft is painted as a typical Air Training Command T-28A of the mid-1950s. It was transferred to the museum in September 1965. It is on display in the museum's Cold War Gallery.
- 49-1663 - Hurlburt Field, Florida.
- 49-1679 - Reese AFB, Texas.
- 49-1682 - Laughlin AFB, Texas.
- 49-1689 - Vance AFB, Oklahoma.
- 49-1695 - Randolph AFB, Texas.
- 50-0300 - Dakota Territory Air Museum, Minot, North Dakota.
- 51-3612 - Museum of Aviation, Robins Air Force Base, Warner Robins, Georgia.
- 51-7500 - Olympic Flight Museum, Olympia, Washington.

T-28B

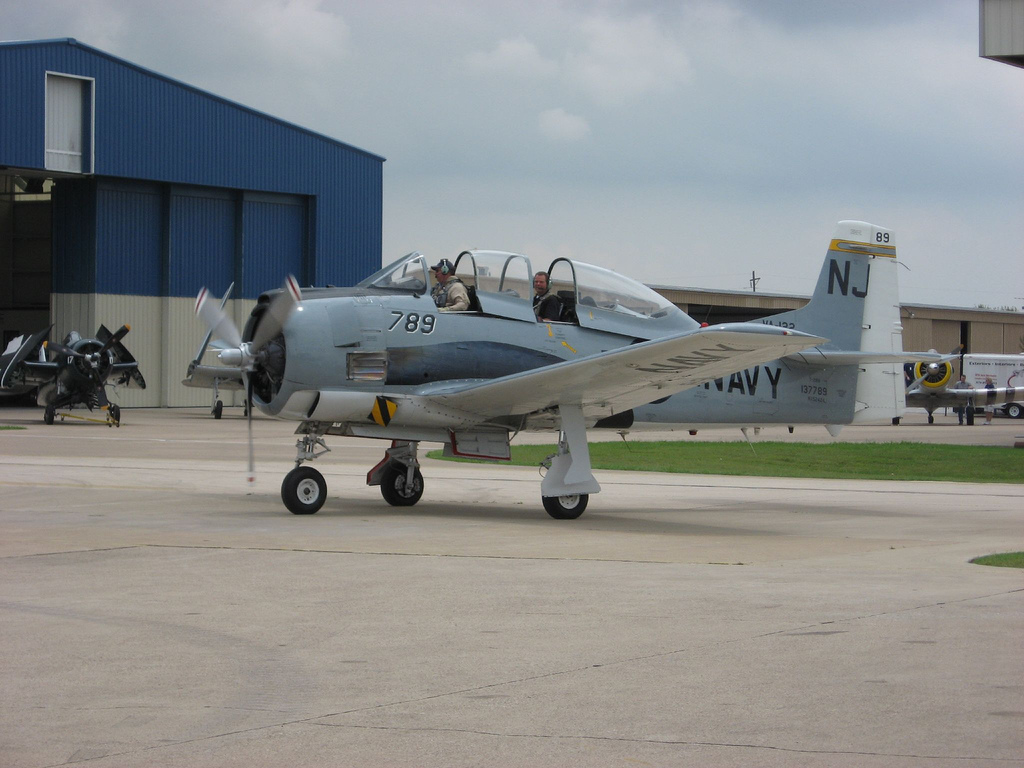
T-28B at the Cavanaugh Flight Museum

- 137702 - Air Force Flight Test Center Museum, Edwards AFB, California.
- 137749 - Hill Aerospace Museum, Hill Air Force Base, Utah
- 137796 - Naval Air Station Anacostia, Washington, D.C.
- 138144 - Naval Air Station Whiting Field, Florida.
- 138164 - Actively flying and performing in airshows with the Trojan Phlyers in Dallas, TX.
- 138192 - Aviation Heritage Center of Wisconsin, Sheboygan Memorial Airport, Sheboygan, WI
- 138247 - War Eagles Air Museum in Santa Teresa, New Mexico.
- 138263 - Actively flying and based at KRLD Richland Airport, Richland, WA
- 138311 - Air Heritage Aviation Museum in Beaver Falls, Pennsylvania
- 138326 - National Naval Aviation Museum, Naval Air Station Pensacola, Florida
- 138339 - Owned by Skydoc 1989–2021 Springfield, Illinois performing with the Trojan Horsemen 2003–2017, and Trojan Thunder 2017–2021. Sold to East Iowa Aviation 6/17/2021 retained N28XT. Destroyed in fatal crash Monticello IA 8/11/2025.
- 138349 - USS Hornet Air and Space Museum Alameda, California
- 138353 - on a pole at Milton, Florida.
- 140047 - Actively flying and performing in airshows with the Trojan Phlyers in Dallas, TX.
- 140048 - National Museum of the United States Air Force at Wright-Patterson AFB in Dayton, Ohio.

T-28C

- 138245 - WarBird Museum of Virginia in Chesterfield, Virginia.
- 140451 - Middleton Field in Evergreen, Alabama
- 140454 - Battleship Cove in Fall River, Massachusetts.
- 140481 - Pima Air & Space Museum adjacent to Davis-Monthan AFB in Tucson, Arizona.
- 140539 - Planes of Fame Air Museum, Grand Canyon Valle Airport, Valle, Arizona
- 140557 - Naval Air Station Wildwood Aviation Museum, Cape May Airport, Rio Grande, New Jersey.
- 140625 - Canadian Valley Technology Center, El Reno, Oklahoma, Used by the Aviation Maintenance Technology program to train Airframe and Powerplant students about radial engines and warbirds.
- 140659 - Southern Museum of Flight, Birmingham, Alabama.

YAT-28E

- 0-13786 - Private collection, Port Hueneme, California. One of two surviving air-frames, currently in storage awaiting restoration.

== Specifications (T-28D) ==
North American T-28B Trojan 3-view drawing

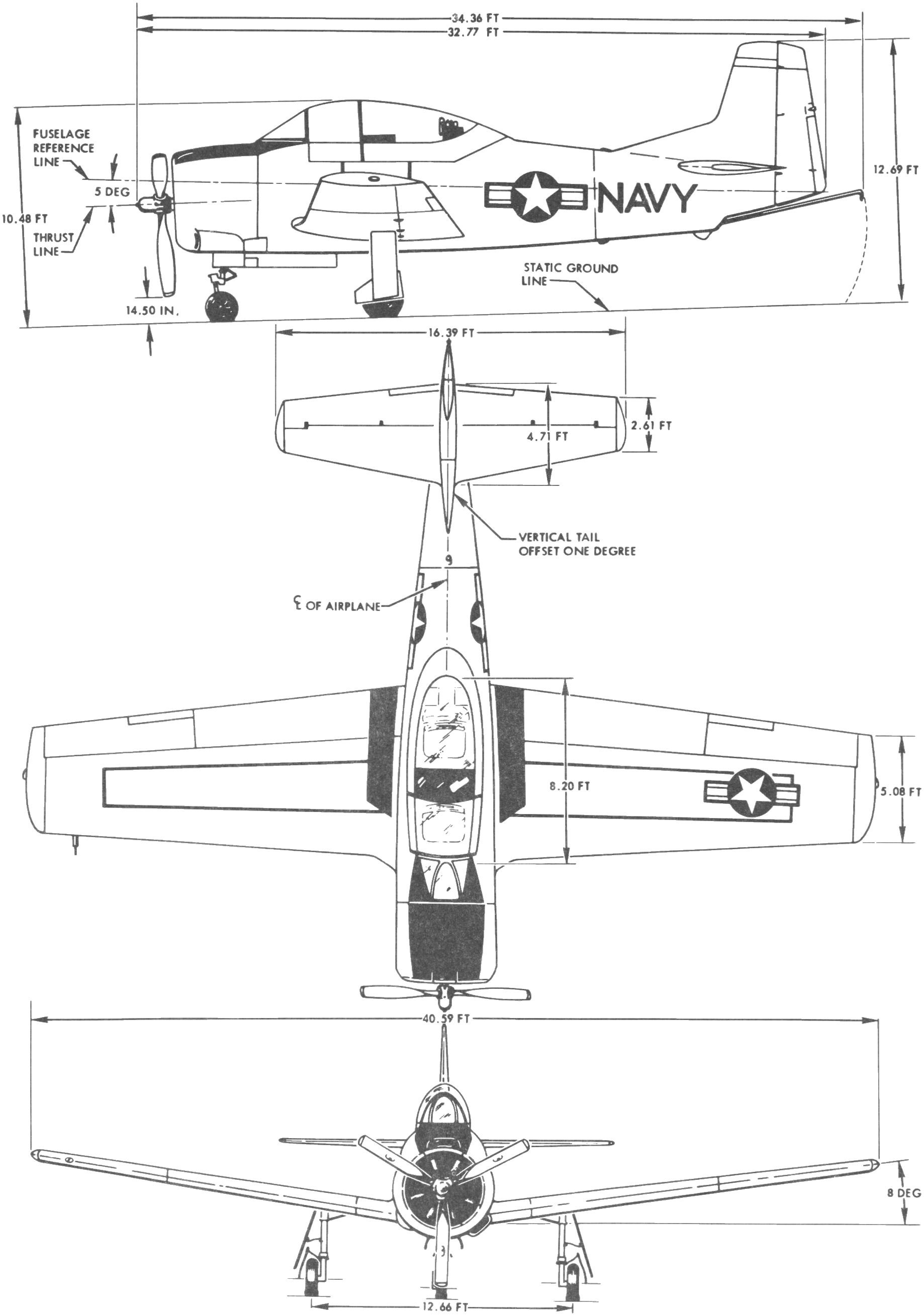
North American T-28C Trojan 3-view drawing

Data from Encyclopedia of World Military Aircraft

General characteristics

- Crew: 2
- Length: 33 ft 0 in (10.06 m)
- Wingspan: 40 ft 1 in (12.22 m)
- Height: 12 ft 8 in (3.86 m)
- Wing area: 268.0 sq ft (24.90 m^{2})
- Aspect ratio: 6.0:1
- Empty weight: 6,424 lb (2,914 kg) (equipped)
- Max takeoff weight: 8,500 lb (3,856 kg)
- Powerplant: 1 × Wright R-1820-86 Cyclone 9-cylinder air-cooled radial engine, 1,425 hp (1,063 kW)

Performance

- Maximum speed: 343 mph (552 km/h, 298 kn) at 10,000 ft (3,000 m)
- Ferry range: 1,060 mi (1,710 km, 920 nmi)
- Service ceiling: 35,500 ft (10,800 m)
- Rate of climb: 3,540 ft/min (18.0 m/s)

Armament

- Hardpoints: 6 with a capacity of 1,200 lb (540 kg) total

== See also ==
- Lee Lue

Related development

- AIDC T-CH-1
- North American XSN2J

Aircraft of comparable role, configuration, and era

- de Havilland Canada DHC-1 Chipmunk
- Hispano HA-100
- North American T-6 Texan
- PZL TS-8 Bies
- Yak-11

Related lists

- List of United States Navy aircraft designations (pre-1962)
- List of military aircraft of the United States
