= AIDC T-CH-1 =

Taiwanese trainer aircraft

T-CH-1
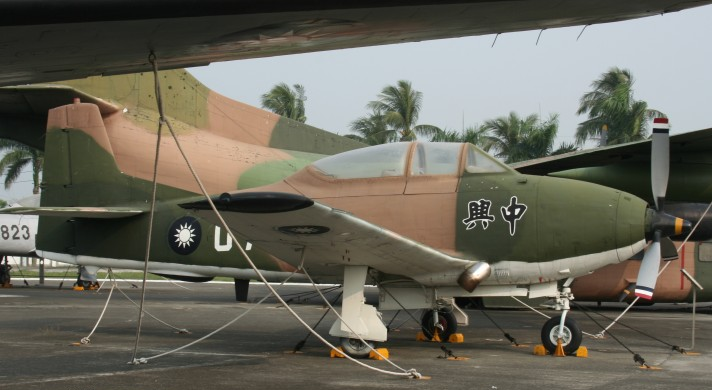
- T-CH-1 at the RoC Air Force Museum in Ganshan

General information
- Type: Trainer
- National origin: Taiwan (Republic of China)
- Manufacturer: Aerospace Industrial Development Corporation
- Status: Retired
- Primary user: Republic of China Air Force
- Number built: 52

History
- First flight: 23 November 1973
- Developed from: North American T-28 Trojan

The AIDC T-CH-1 Chung Hsing (Chinese: 中興) was a turboprop-powered military trainer aircraft produced in Taiwan (Republic of China).

== Development ==
Development of the T-CH-1 began in November 1970. Based on the North American T-28 Trojan training aircraft, the T-CH-1 had a low-wing monoplane design with tricycle landing gear and two seats in tandem. By September 1973, the first prototype had been completed and on 23 November 1973, it made its first flight. A second prototype, able to carry weaponry, was also produced, and completed its first flight on 27 November 1974. Alongside the two prototypes, a further 50 aircraft were ordered for the Republic of China Air Force, with the final aircraft delivered in late 1981.

== Variants ==
- T-CH-1 Chung Hsing : Two-seat basic trainer, light attack aircraft for the Republic of China Air Force.
- A-CH-1 : Two-seat weapons training aircraft for the Republic of China Air Force.
- R-CH-1 : Two-seat reconnaissance aircraft for the Republic of China Air Force.

== Operators ==
Taiwan (Republic of China)

- Republic of China Air Force

== Specifications ==
Data from Jane's All The World's Aircraft 1980–81

General characteristics

- Crew: 2
- Length: 10.26 m (33 ft 8 in)
- Wingspan: 12.19 m (40 ft 0 in)
- Height: 3.66 m (12 ft 0 in)
- Wing area: 25.18 m^{2} (271.0 sq ft)
- Aspect ratio: 6:1
- Airfoil: NACA 64-2A215
- Empty weight: 2,608 kg (5,750 lb)
- Gross weight: 3,402 kg (7,500 lb)
- Max takeoff weight: 5,057 kg (11,149 lb)
- Fuel capacity: 963 L (212 imp gal; 254 US gal)
- Powerplant: 1 × Avco Lycoming T53-L-701 turboprop, 1,082 kW (1,451 hp)

Performance

- Maximum speed: 590 km/h (370 mph, 320 kn) at 15,000 ft (4,600 m)
- Cruise speed: 310 km/h (200 mph, 170 kn) at 15,000 ft (4,600 m) (econ cruise)
- Stall speed: 93 km/h (58 mph, 50 kn)
- Never exceed speed: 690 km/h (430 mph, 370 kn)
- Range: 2,010 km (1,250 mi, 1,090 nmi) (with maximum fuel)
- Service ceiling: 9,800 m (32,000 ft)
- Rate of climb: 17 m/s (3,400 ft/min)

== See also ==
Related development

- North American T-28 Trojan

Aircraft of comparable role, configuration, and era

- Beechcraft T-34 Mentor
